= Fergushill =

Village in North Ayrshire, Scotland

Coordinates: 55°39′21.5″N 4°39′11.1″W

Fergushill is a small community in North Ayrshire, Parish of Kilwinning, Scotland. The Barony of Fergushill was held by the Fergushill family of that Ilk and the area has a complex history.

Fergushill, Kilwinning, Ayrshire.

== History ==
=== The Fergushills of that Ilk ===
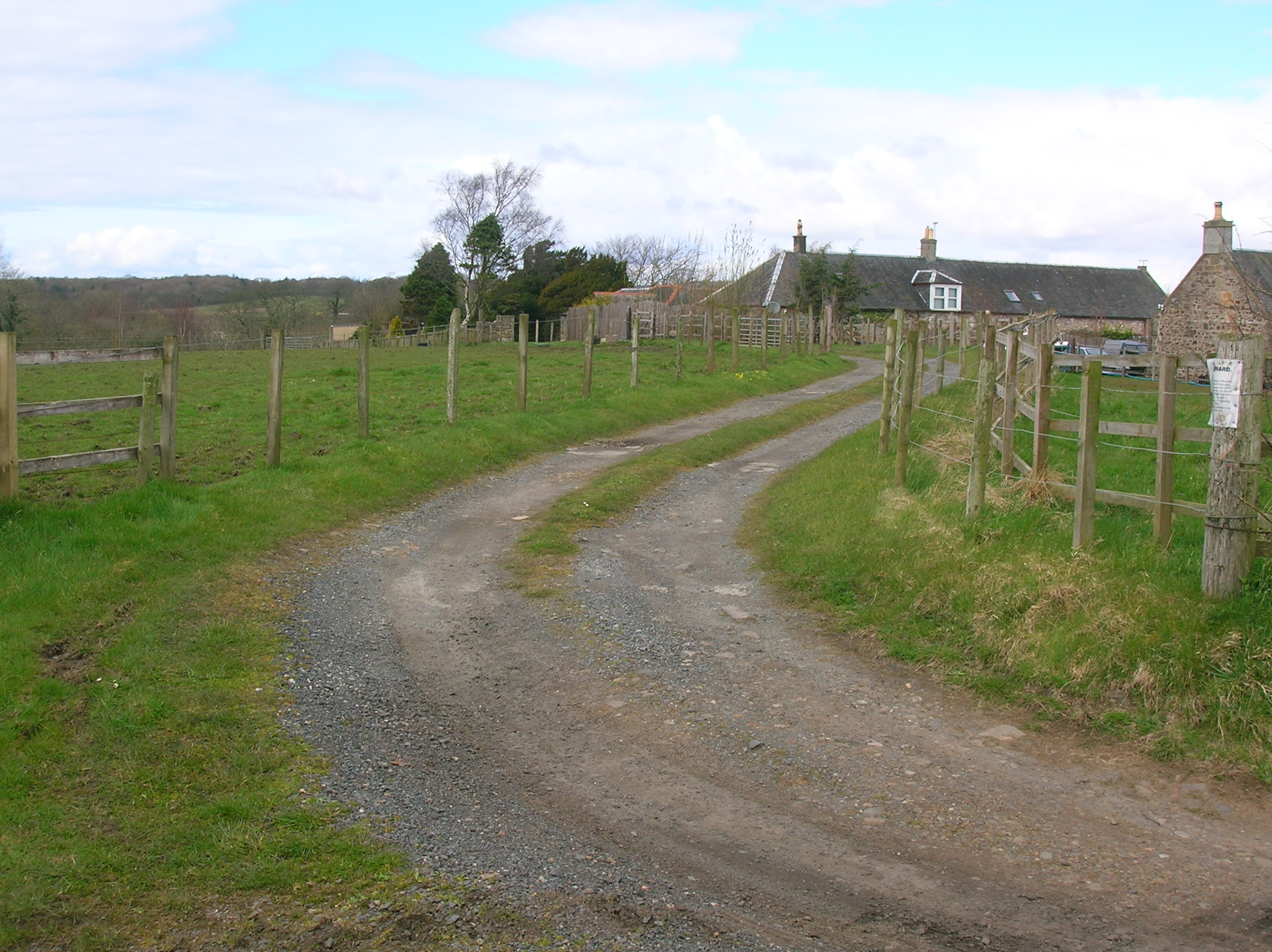
The old driveway to Fergushill House and the site of the gatehouse.

'Fergushill' as a surname is a sept of the Clan Fergusson; the area is either named after the family, i.e. Fergushill of that Ilk, or more likely, took the name of the area as their patronym, as with the Cunninghame clan. Robert de Fergushill de Eodem had an extensive estate here in 1417; 'de Eodem' refers to the patronym being the same name as the barony. In 1577, A. Fergushill, burgess of Ayr, sold the lands of Gallisholmes to John Wallace of Craigie.

Patrick Lowrie was convicted in 1605 of being a warlock and sentenced to be first strangled, then burned at the stake in Edinburgh. One of his crimes was stated as being for art and part of the Bewitching of certain milk kye, pertaining to Johnne Fergushill, younger, in Halie, at Beltane 1604 years; whereby the kye gave no milk but blood and worsome (purlent) therafter.

John Fergushill (1592–1644) was a Covenanter minister, who in 1618 refused to conform with the decision of the General Assembly of the Church of Scotland to accept the Five Articles of Perth; these included religious practices retained in England but largely abolished in Scotland and were widely resented. He was imprisoned in 1620 but later released and closely associated with the 1638 National Covenant, objecting to liturgical 'innovations.' He was a leader in the kirk's rejection of bishops that led to the 1638-1639 Bishop's Wars and an associate of Presbyterian fundamentalists, including James Guthrie, executed in 1661 and Archibald Johnson.

In 1671 David Fergushill went to the Corsehill Barony Court to obtain payment for a boill bear from one Thomas Wylie of Little Corsehill. In the 17th-century it was the custom in respectable families for the names of the principal friends present to be entered into the baptismal register. Mr. Baillie of Monkton's register had the names Fergushill, Ashinyards and Muncardine entered.

Robert Fergushill, who died in the late 17th-century, was the last of the family to be local lairds; he is listed in a charter from Robert Hunter of Hunterston as owning a share in the 46s 8d land of Annanhill-Hunter, but William Henry Dunlop remained the proprietor. Alexander Crauford of Fergushill is named as a Commissioner of Supply for Ayrshire in the 1685 records of the Parliament of Scotland. In 1691 the 'House of Fergushill' itself had seven hearths listed in the Hearth Tax records and eighteen other properties within the barony.

The Laird of Fergushill in the early 18th century was one of the local landowners who ordered the bailies of Kilmarnock to 'causeway' the streets, an early example of road improvements in Ayrshire.

=== Fergushill House and other properties of that name ===
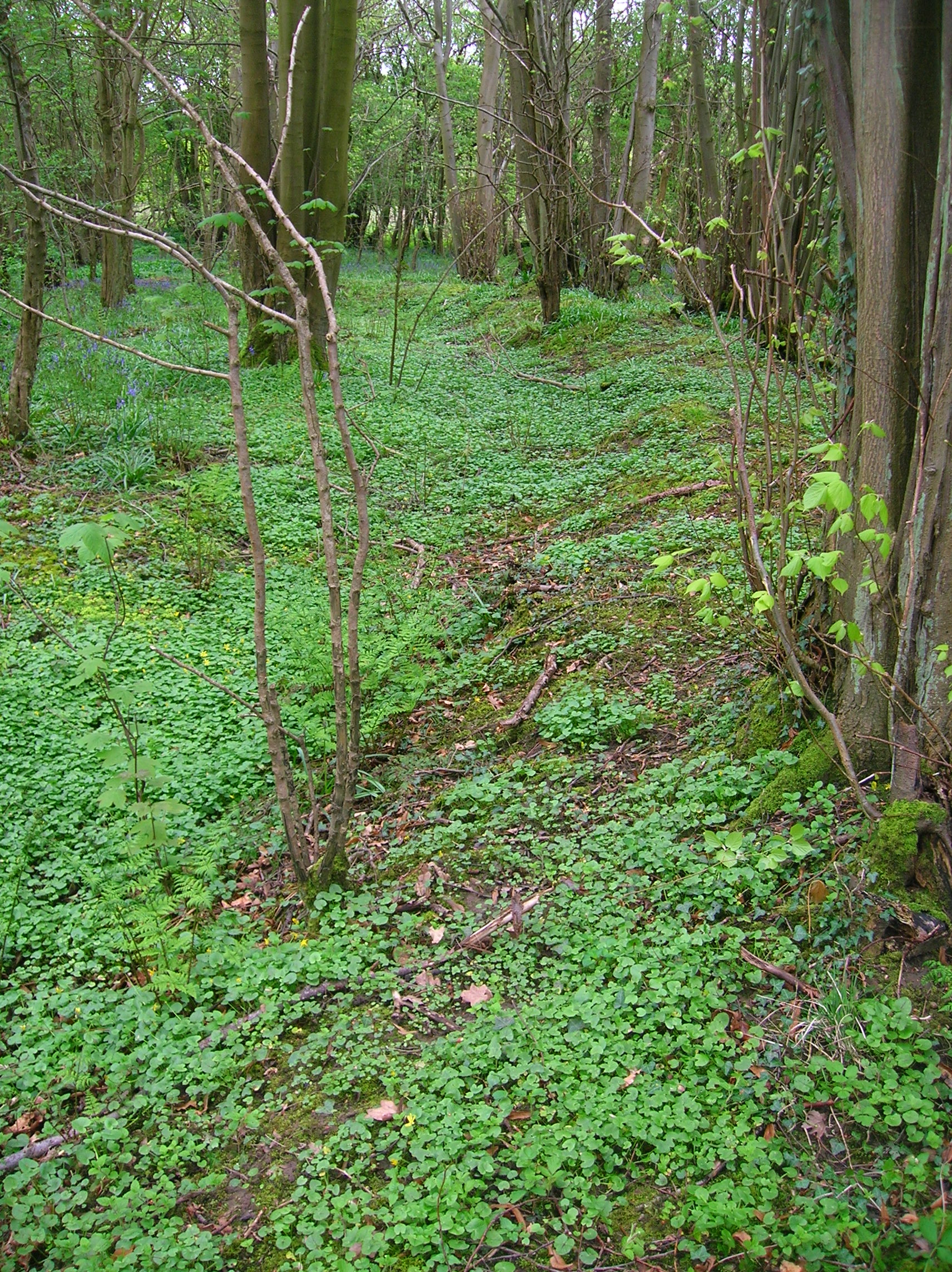
Landform feature in Chapelholms woods; this may indicate the boundary between the baronies of Fergushill and Eglinton.

A number of properties in the surrounding area bear the name 'Fergushill,' including Knockentiber, North & South Fergushills near Eglinton and Fergushill in Auchentiber.

In 1596, Fergushill and Middle Auchentiber were inherited by Robert Fergushill, whose wife Elizabeth was the daughter of John Craufurd of Craufurdland; when he died in 1625, it passed to his son, also named Robert. Sometime after 1660, it passed first to Robert's relative Alexander Craufurd, then to his eldest son John Crawfurd in the 1690s.

This was a time of hardship and famine in Scotland, known as the Seven ill years; in December 1696, the city of Edinburgh set up a refugee camp in Greyfriars kirkyard to house starving rural migrants. John was already under financial pressure in 1696 when he purchased Kersland, near Kilbirnie from his wife's elder sister, Jean Ker. He assumed the name and title of John Ker of Kersland and spent the next 30 years avoiding bankruptcy, including a period as a government spy. He sold Fergushill in 1718 to John Asgill and Robert Hackett for £3600, who mortgaged it back to him for £2,600; John died in 1726 in the King's Bench Debtors Prison, London.

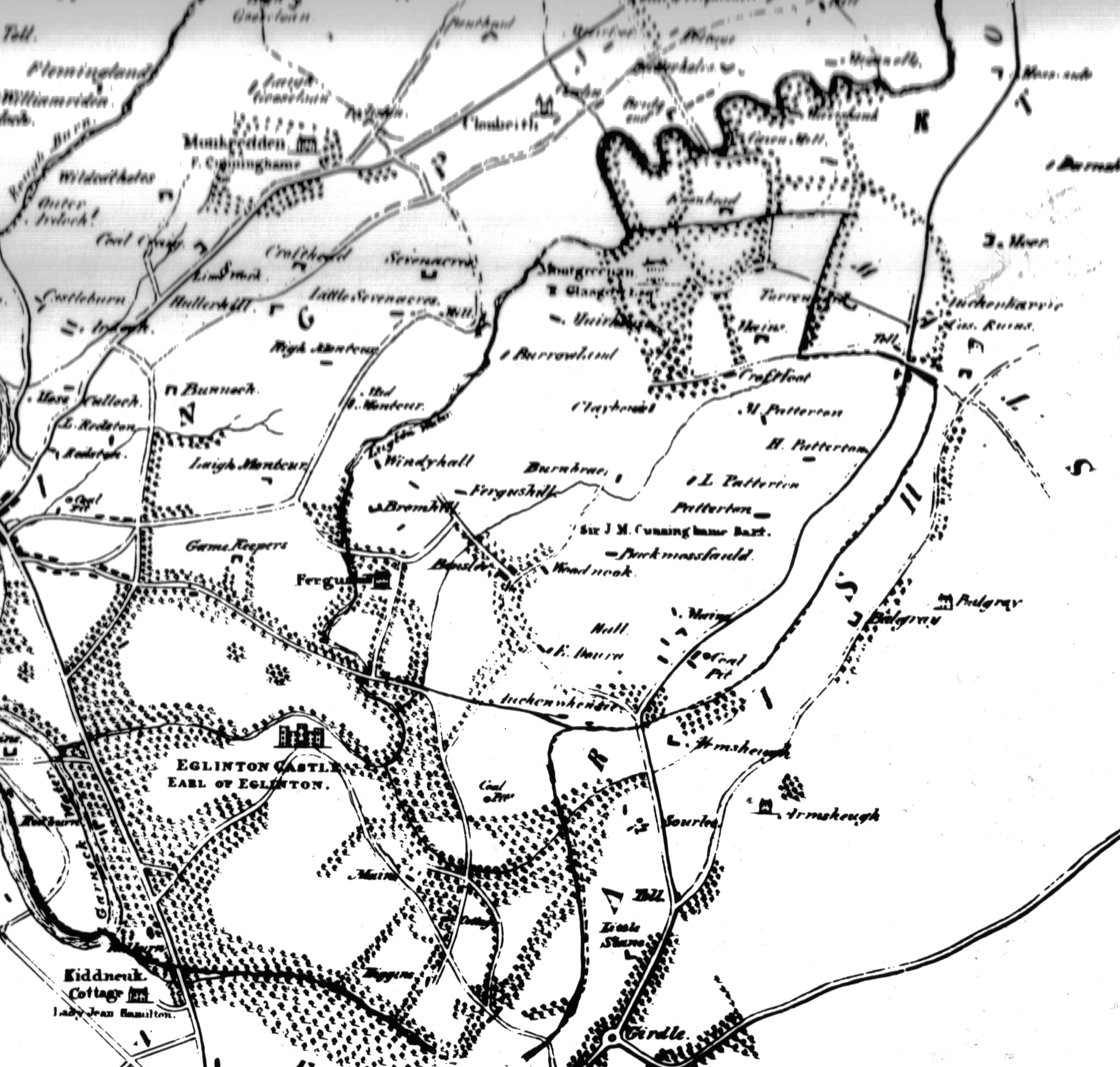
1823 map showing the position of Fergushill House and other details.

At this point, legal ownership becomes complex but court records from February 1749 show it had been sold by 'Thomas Craufurd of Fergushill, to Neil Macvicar, writer in Edinburgh.' This seems to have taken place in 1728 and it stayed in the Macvicar family until 1802, when it passed to Robert Glasgow of Montgreenan.

Andrew Armstrong's 1775 publication 'A new map of Ayrshire,' shows Fergushill House located on the north side of Lugton Water, around 75 yards (70 metres) east of the old horse tramway and road bridges, or 'Elbo and Chael' as they were known locally. Fergushill was at its most prosperous around 1560; In 1799, the 12th Earl of Eglinton acquired the house, estate and coal pits, which were joined to Eglinton as a 'pendicle,' a Scots legal term for a subsidiary part of a larger estate. Robin Cummell or Campbell, who worked at Eglinton Castle, states that the Fergushill miners were sold with the land, normal practice for the time.

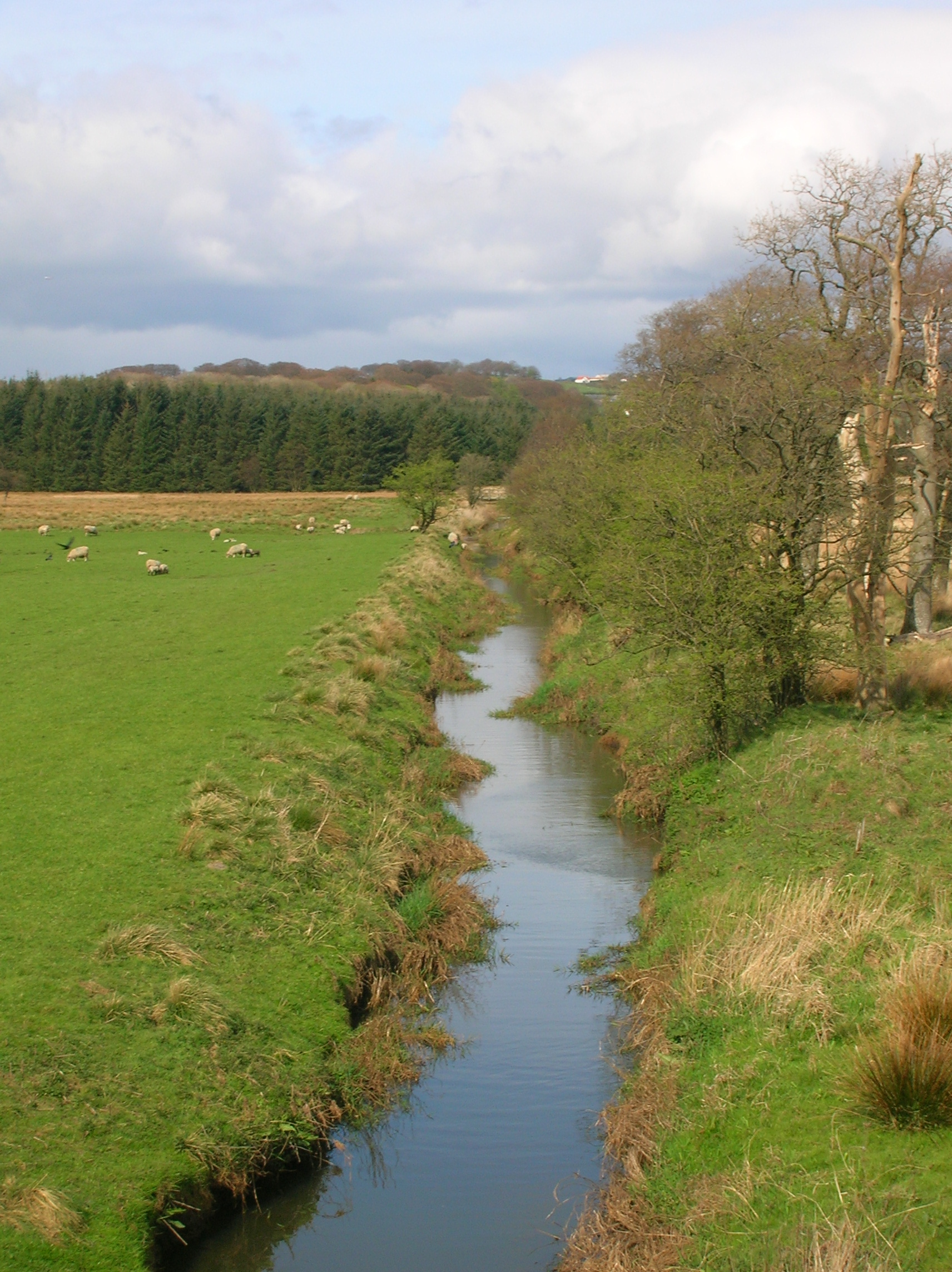
Lugton Water, modern day.

The house was described as 'A good mansion, surrounded by some fine old trees, render the place still worthy of being inhabited by ane honest and descreit gentleman.' After 1803, it was used by George Reid of Barquharry, Factor to the Earl of Eglinton and a friend of Robert Burns.

Cummell records Reid was fond of entertaining at Fergushill. One of his most interesting guests was Byla Greenshields, who habitually wore yellow buckskin trousers and white shoes to his dinners at Fergushill; the usual invitation was - Dear Byla, The leather breeks and taps buits on Thursday.

Fergushill is described in 1823 as 'a commodious farm house, covered with thatch: but its ancient gardens, pretty well stored with plum and other fruit trees, indicate its former rank.' By 1991, all that remained of the old house were a few low walls near South Fergushill Farm and present day Fergushill cottage, a disused driveway and demolished gate-lodge.

Aerial photographs and observations on the ground show the Chapelholms woodlands still contain the ditch, dyke and coppiced trees that may have formed the boundary between the two baronies of Fergushill and Eglinton.

Townhead of Fulwood belonged to James Fergushill, disposed to him by Alexander Dunlop of that Ilk in 1687; this remained within the family until about 1750, when it was acquired by William Mackie of Mosside.

== The Darien Affair ==
The Darien Company was an attempt by the Scots to set up a trading colony in America in the late 1690s, however the opposition from England and elsewhere was so great that the attempt failed with huge losses and great financial implications for the country and for individuals. Half of the whole circulating capital of Scotland was subscribed and mostly lost. In Cunninghame some examples of losses are John Craufurd of Fergushill (£1000), Hugh Stevenson of Mongtreenan (£1000), and Sir William Cunninghame of Cunninghamhead (£1000). In modern terms a thousand pounds loss in the 17th century must have been a devastating blow even to the finances of great landowning families.

== Fergushill church ==
Fergushill church in Benslie was built to serve the local rural and mining communities of Doura, Fergushill, and Montgreenan. It was consecrated on Sunday, 3 November 1879 and the first minister was then Rev. William McAlpine. It got its name from the Fergushill Mission which was based at Fergushill school, which was closed in 1950. The church had its spire blown down in a gale in 1968, also damaging the roof; the building was repaired in 1969. By the mid-1970s, the church was linked to the Erskine Church of Scotland in Kilwinning, and services were led by Erskine's minister, the Rev. Rudolf Dehn, who had been a nuclear scientist at Dounreay before going into the ministry; several young people from the Fergushill area joined Erskine Church's youth group at this time. The Church of Scotland Presbytery of Ardrossan decided to close the church in June 2009; over a hundred people attended the final Sunday service.

=== Views of Fergushill church and manse ===
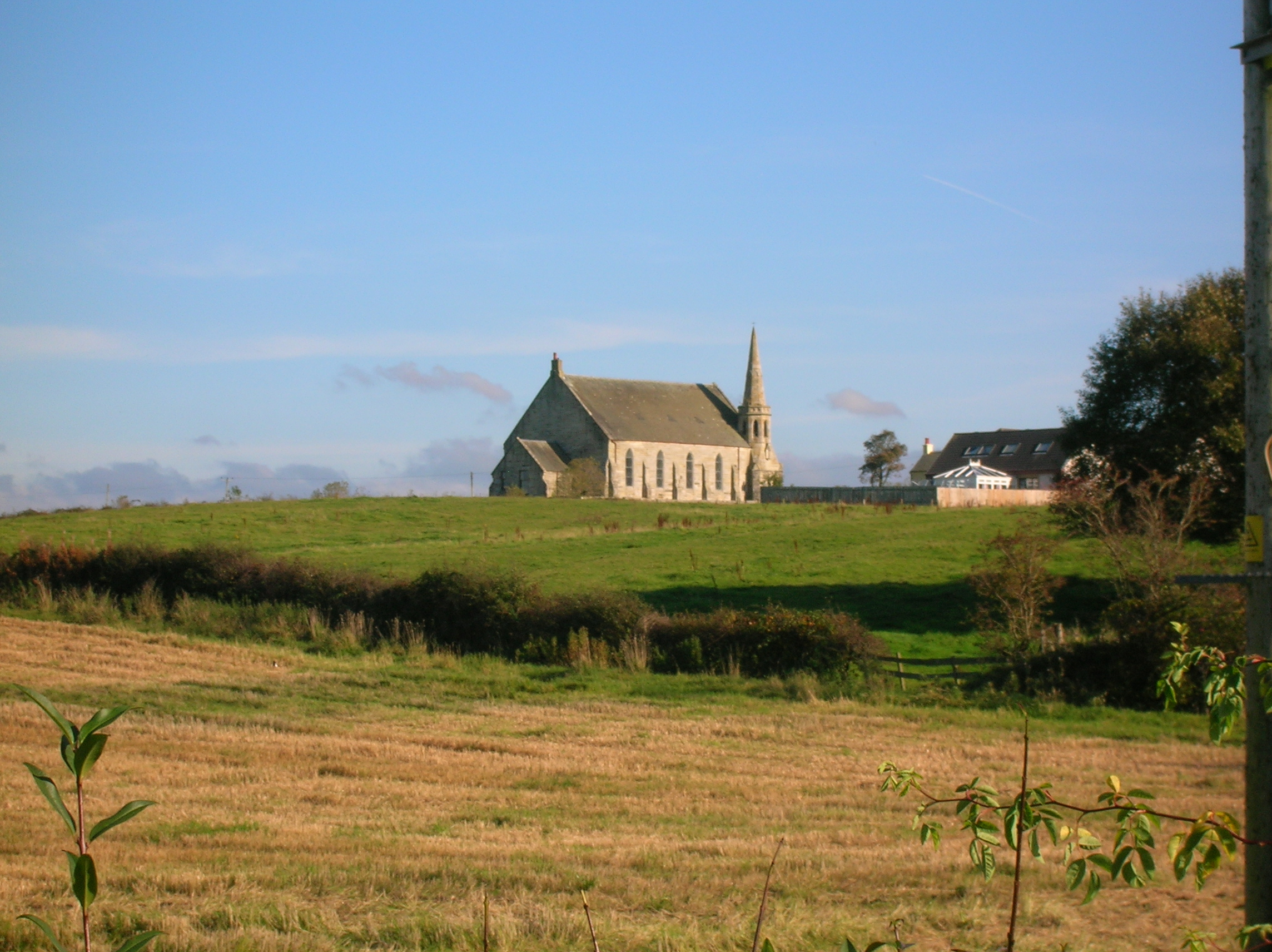
The old Fergushill church at Benslie.

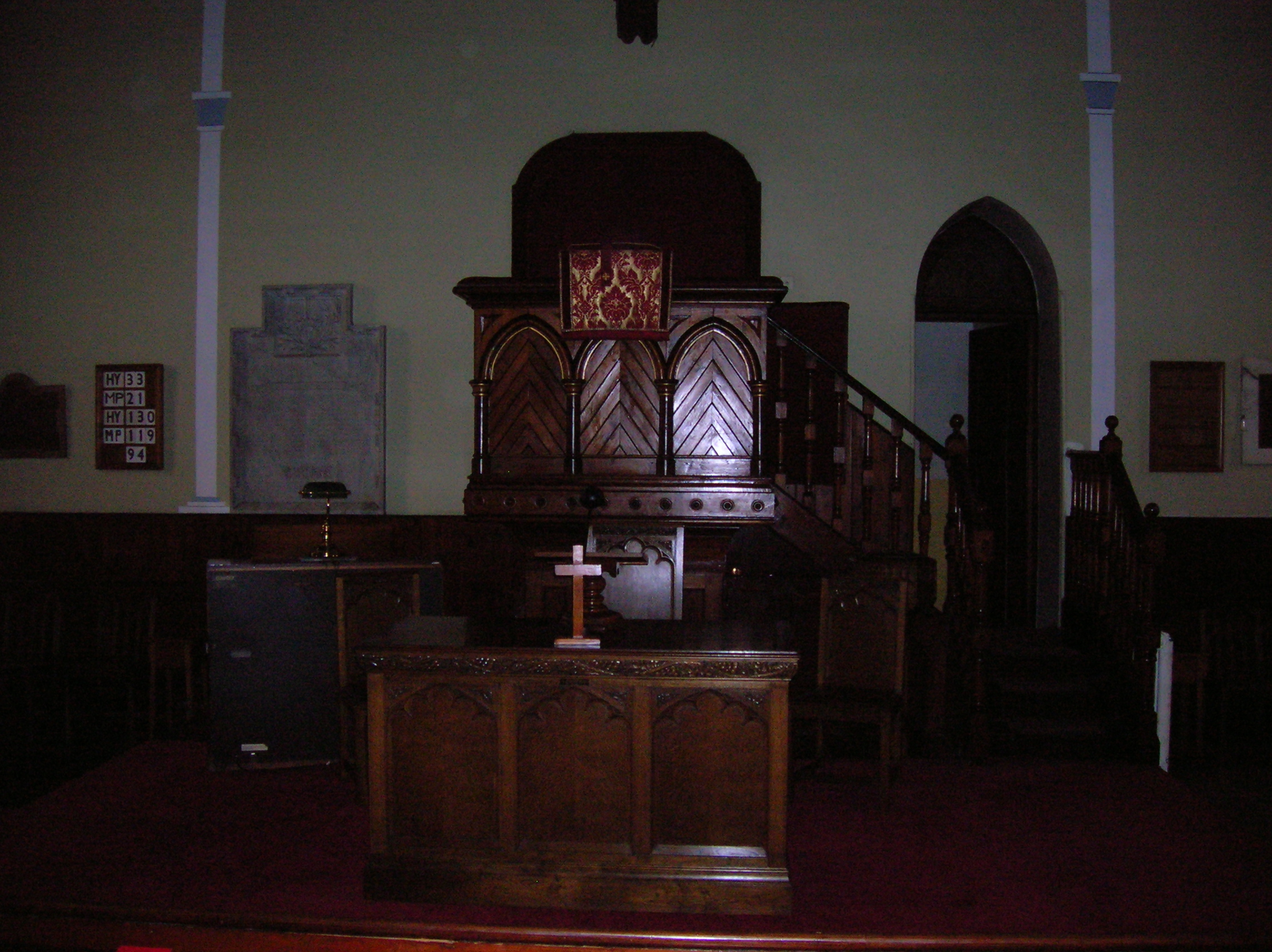
The interior.

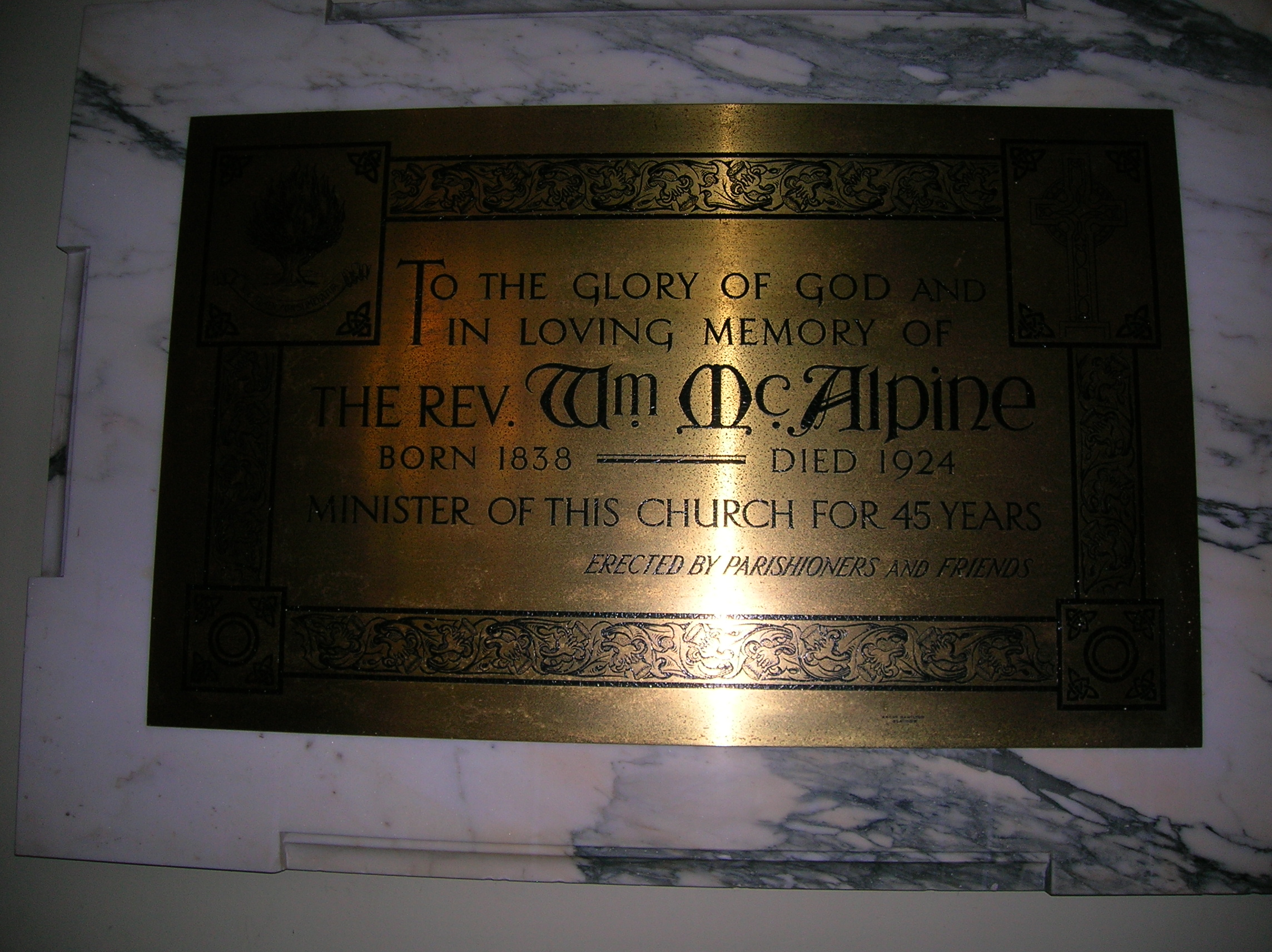
Memorial to William MacAlpine.

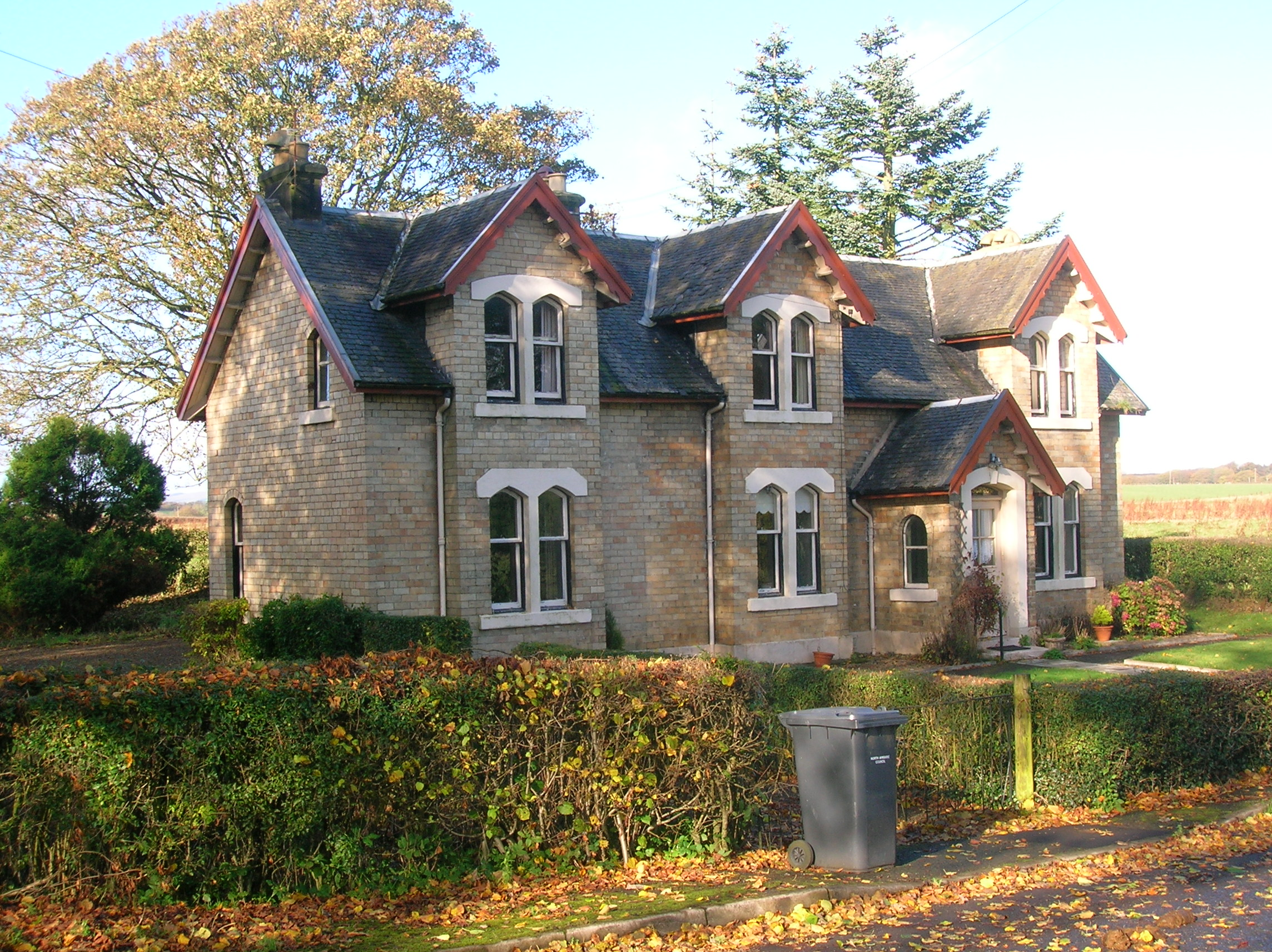
Janburrow, Fergushill church's old manse and previously the G&SWR company agent's office near Montgreenan.

== The rural community ==
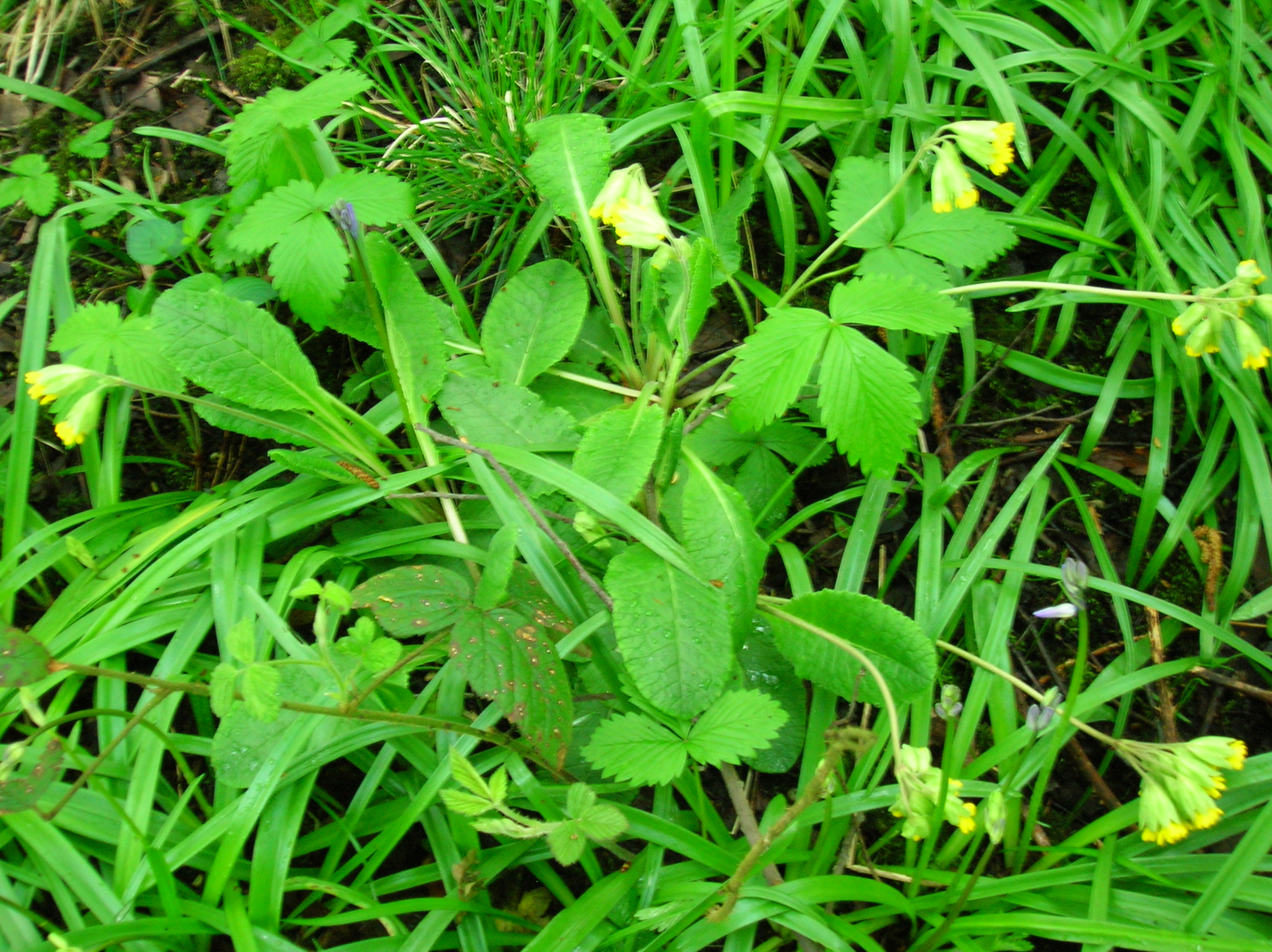
Cowslips from the Chapelholms woods.

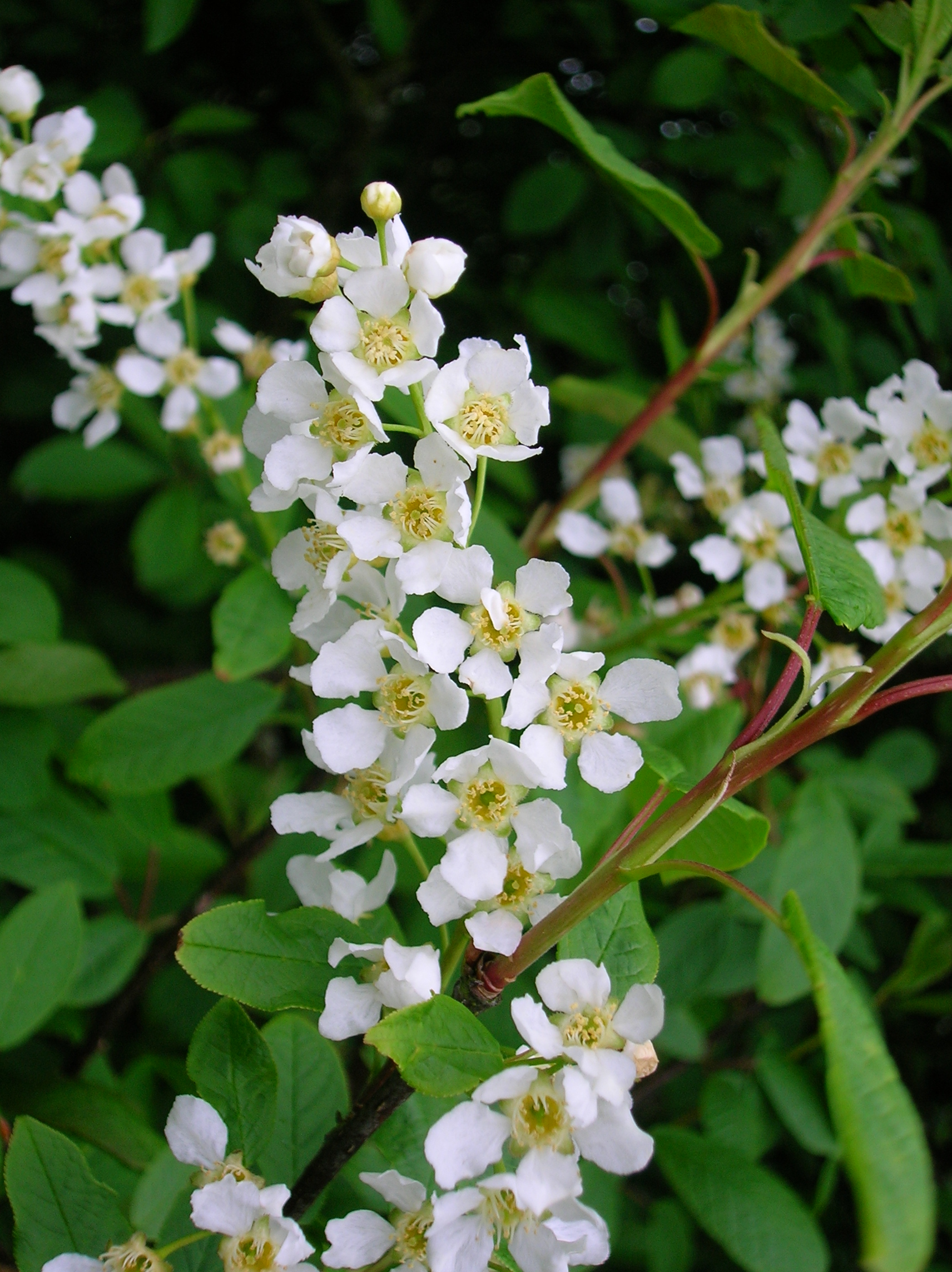
Bird Cherry in the woods.

Fergushill Cottage faced the Lugton Water just below the point at which the Fergushill Burn joins the river. Nothing much remains, however a Mrs. Miller once lived here and she recollected collecting water from the well which still exists as a circular low brick wall near to the site. In 1881 the Census records that a Minister, Mr. William McAnespin lived here, together with his sister Jannette McAnespin and a servant Marion Mackay. A weir still exists on the Lugton Water near here and this was the site of a drowning in the 1990s. Saughtrees on the Eglinton estate side of the road was a gamekeepers cottage in 1837.

In 1814 a flour mill was located on the Eglinton Castle side of the Lugton Water upstream of the bridge and a miller's house was situated on the other side of the river. The building of the waggonway and bridge seems to have resulted in the demolition of this house. A path ran from it to a plantation next to the river.

Sevenacres Mill is fairly close by. It is known by the locals as 'Snakers Mill.' A small estate existed near here in the 1560s, held by William Montgomery, said to be descended from the Montgomerys of Smithstone.

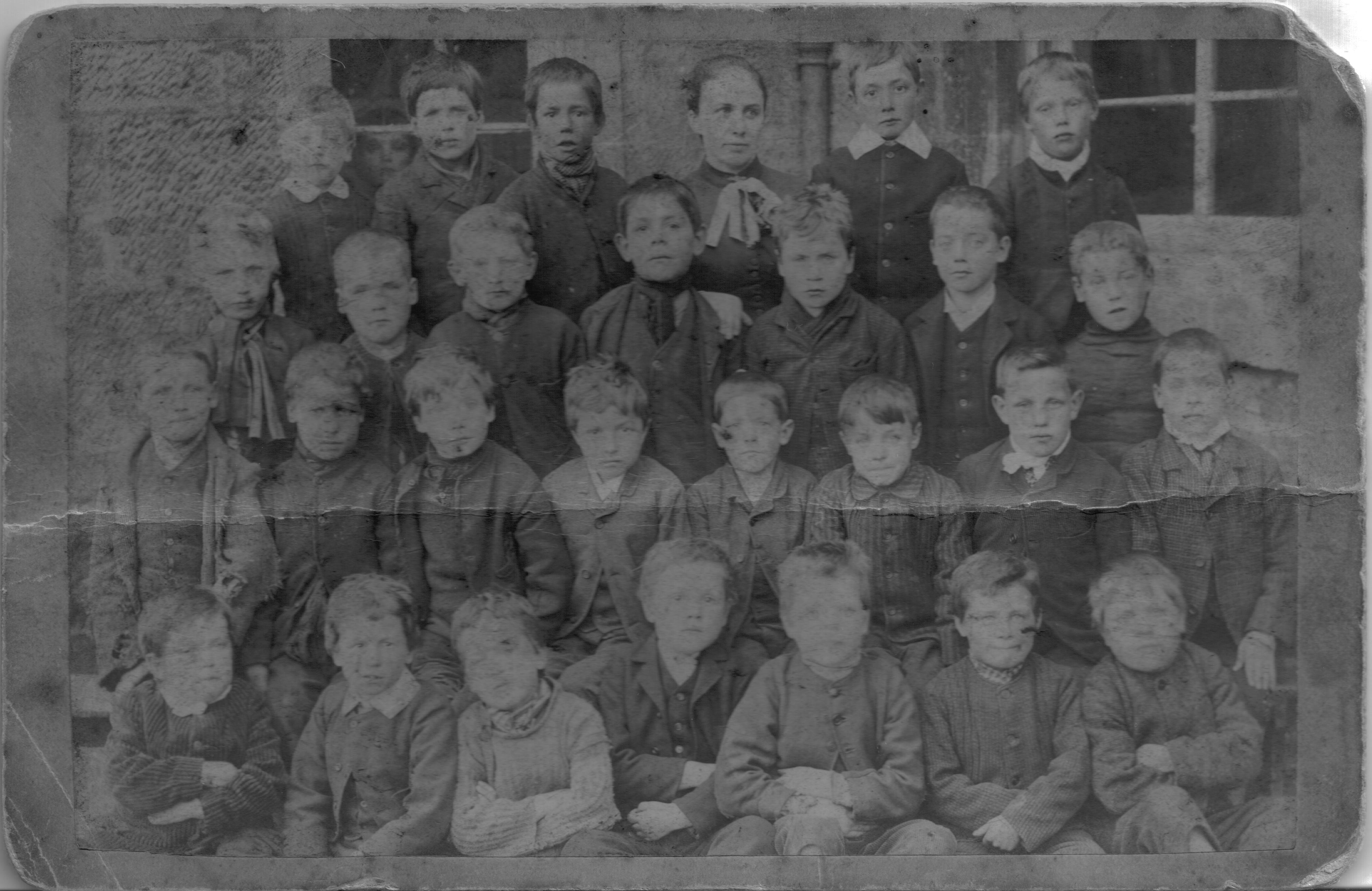
Pupils in front of Fergushill School. Date unknown.

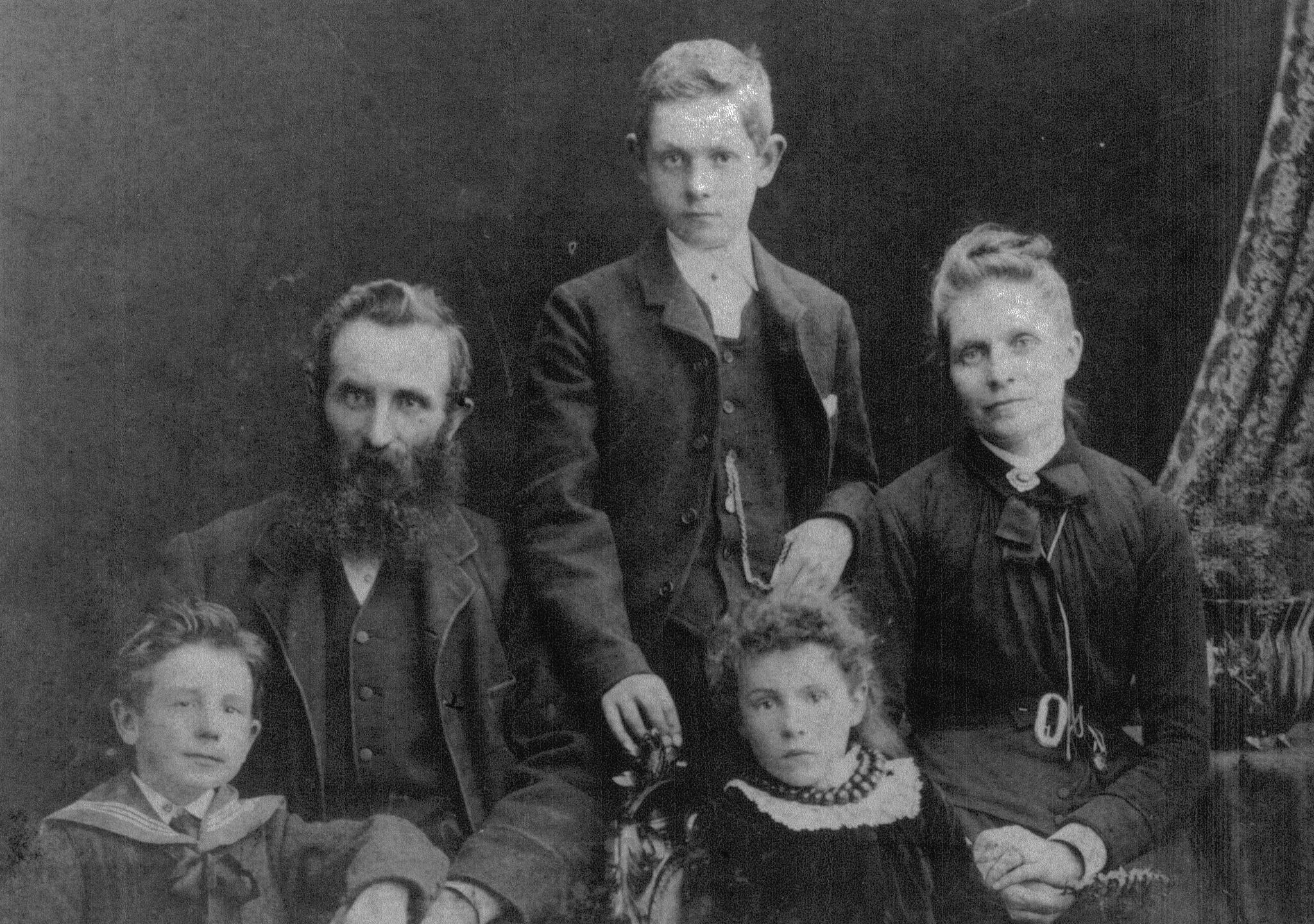
The Montgomery family of Fergushill miners village.

Saugh Trees cottage sits close to the old waggonway bridge and a cottage by the unusual name of 'Redboiler' used to sit road junction up to Seven Acres. Red Boiler had a number of large metal boiler vessels, used for steam generation at the coal mines, that were brought down from the mines for cleaning and scouring at this site.

John Thomson's Atlas of Scotland, 1832, marks a 'Baker's Mill' on the Lugton Water, possibly explaining the presence of the surviving weir. Both may also relate to the old barony mill.

Fergushill had a Mission Hall from circa 1890 to 1936; it also served Benslie. The hall was dismantled and rebuilt at the Dirrans. Glass slides bearing choruses and verses used at the Mission Hall are now held by the Kilwinning Abbey Heritage Centre.

The patches of ash / elm woodland running up to Seven Acres Mill are amongst the very few remaining ancient woodlands in the Irvine area with mainly indigenous species and a continuous history of woodland cover.

== The school ==
Fergushill school house still exists, however the school, which sat on the road up to Broomhill and North Fergushill farms has been demolished. This school was a replacement for the older school which had existed at the 'High Row' close to the railway.

== The industrial past ==
John Smith in 1895 records the remains of an old lade, which supplied water to drive a wheel wherewith the old coal-pits used to be drained. A relatively early example of the use of such technology.

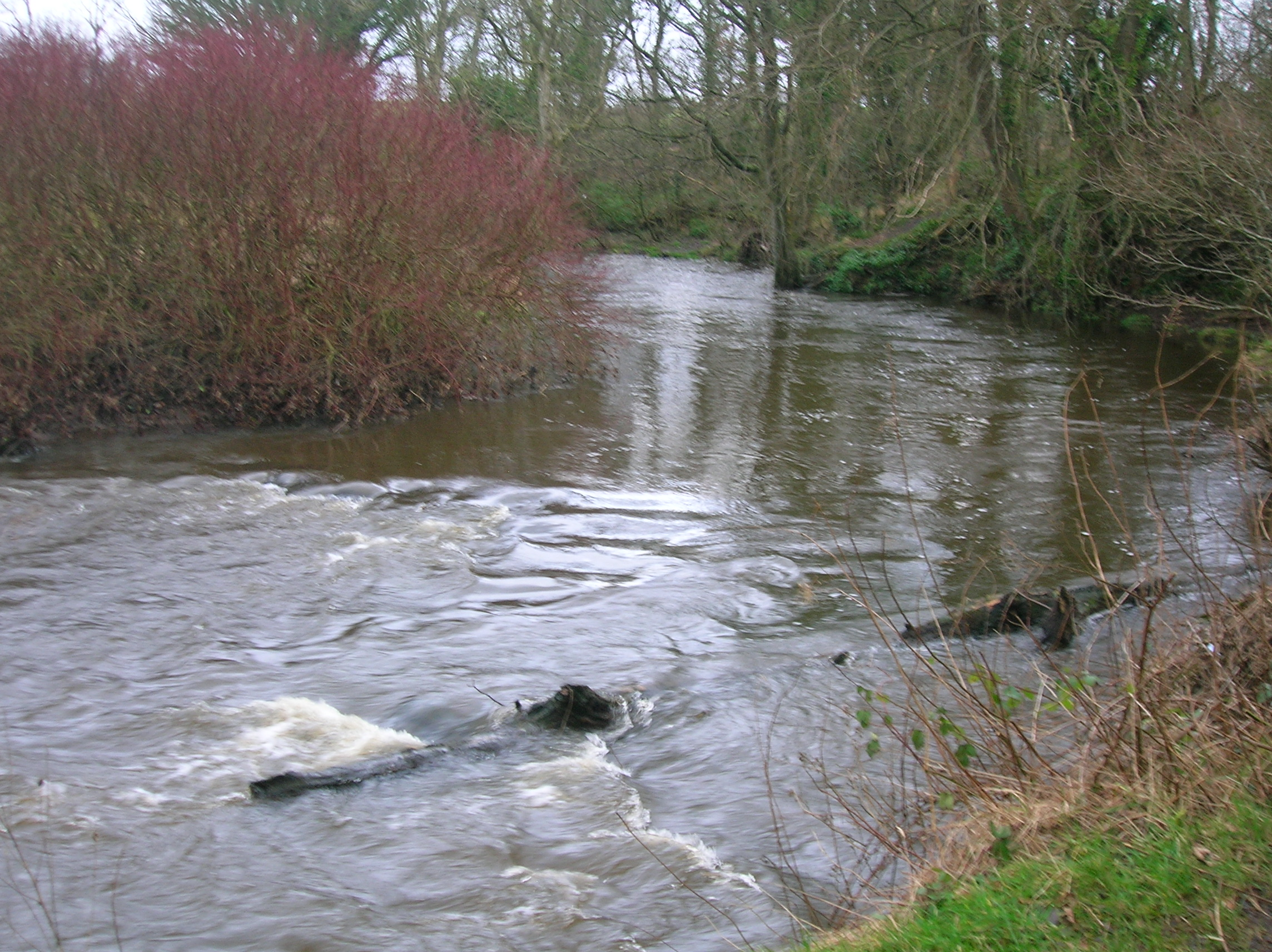
The old weir on the Lugton Water at Fergushill.

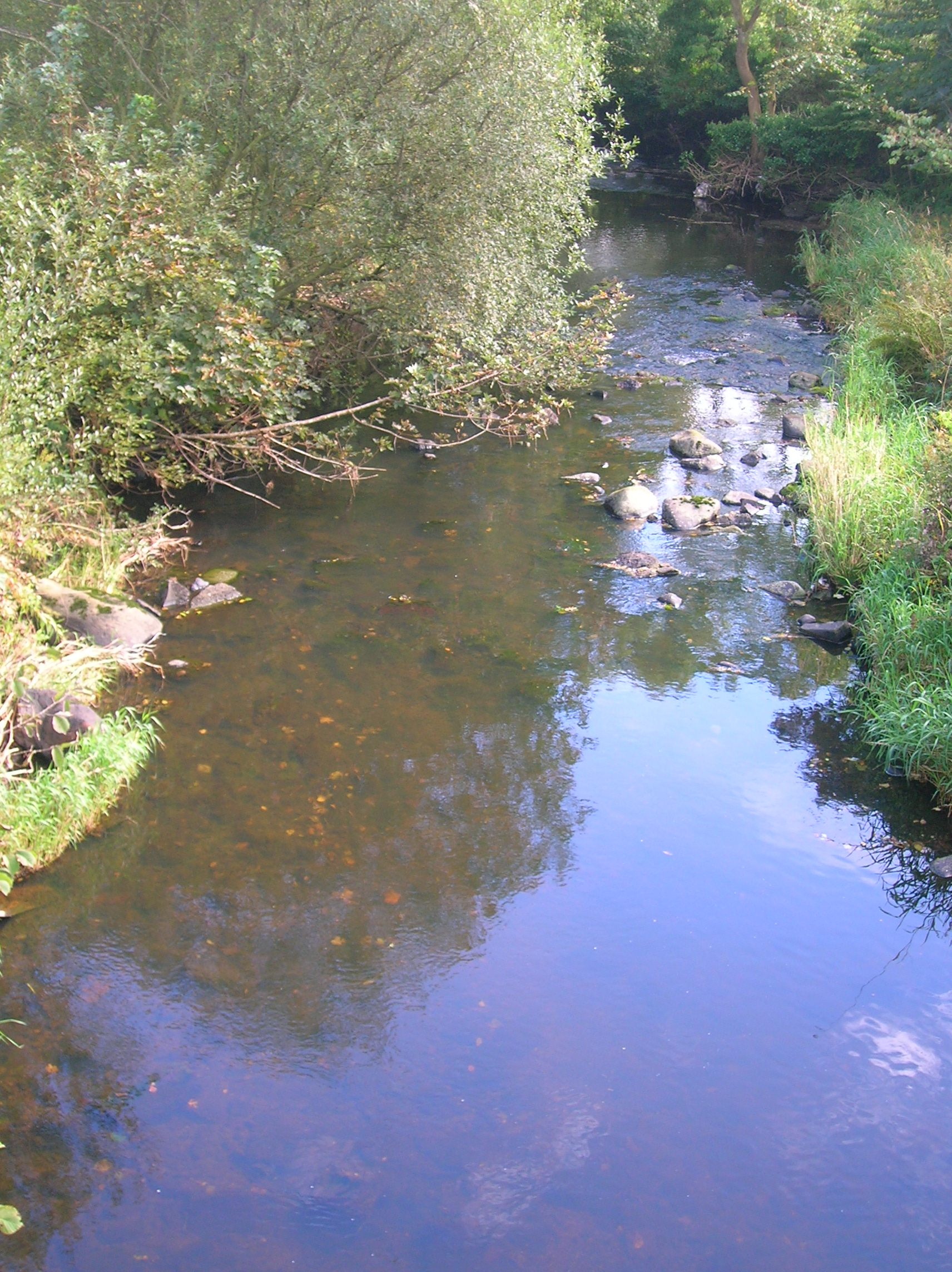
The Lugton Water from the Lugton Bridge at Fergushill, near to the old Waggonway bridge.

In 1874 Dobie records that a miner's village called Fergushill existed with a population of 531. Groome refers to the colliers village as having been established in around 1835.

Fergushill miners' village, was owned by Messrs. Finnie & Son. It was composed of 7 rows of cottages. There were ten thatched cottages. In 1913 63 persons lived here. One room, measuring 9 by 6 ft (2.7 by 1.8 m), held thirteen persons. The rows had names like Wellington and Burn. At one time there were 78 houses in the village, with a population of 363. It was demolished and nothing now remains at the site, other than North Fergushill farm.

A horse drawn tramway, opened in 1834, which ran up to Fergushill and Doura, ending at the coal pit. The old waggonway bridge across the Lugton Water still stands.

Fergushill Tile Works existed in 1858, but is not shown on the 1897 OS map. A number of freight lines have run through the village, connecting the main line near Montgreenan with the Doura branch.

One of the Fergushill collieries stood near the Chapel gate cottage (no longer present) of the Eglinton castle estate; the mine bing still survives amongst a screen of secondary woodland. In 1929 Fergushill Pit No. 23 & 28 were known as the 'Happy Home' and No. 7 was called 'The Rover.' The Statistical Account records that the coals at Doura were main and stone-coals. Laigh Fergus-hill (sic) mine was owned by Mr McDowal and was leased by him for £100 per annum in the 18th century. A great quantity of coal had at one time been exported through Irvine to Ireland. Eglinton Colliery was flooded for some years after miners broke into an old waste at Fergushill in November 1747. The early mines were laid up in the 1790s.

A William Forgisal (Fergushill) of Torranyard was miner at the Doura Pit in the 18th century. He lost his leg in a mining accident, as had his father. William's wife was a tough sort, her comment being on seeing him so encumbered, was that the Forgisals would need a small plantation of their own to keep them in crutches.

=== The Ardrossan and Johnstone Railway - Fergushill branch ===
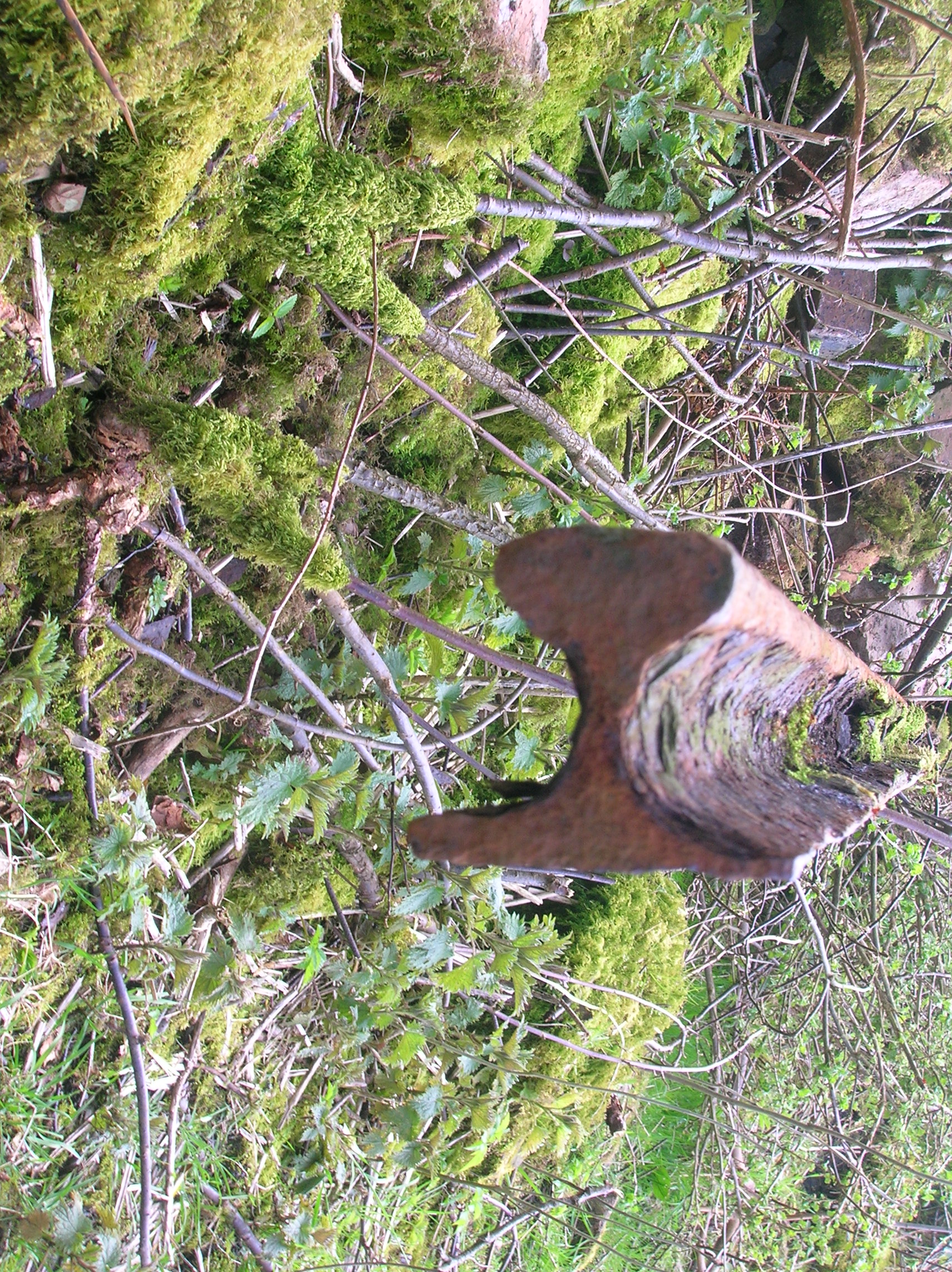
A flat bottomed and 15-foot-long (4.5 m) section of Vignole rail from the 1831 Ardrossan and Johnstone Railway

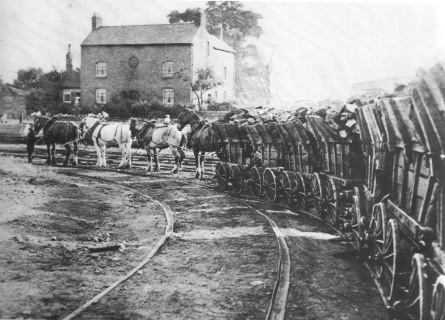
A typical waggonway. The Little Eaton Gangway.

This line began life as a waggonway which opened in 1831 between Ardrossan and Kilwinning and was known as the Ardrossan and Johnstone Railway. It was initially built to the Scotch gauge of 4 ft 6 in (1,372 mm) and was worked by horses. It had a passenger services worked by a carriages, which held 24 passengers; 16 inside and 8 outside. The railway was built by the Glasgow, Paisley and Johnstone Canal company. It commenced on the west side of Ardrossan harbour. The three-mile-long (five-kilometre) Doura branch left the main line near Stevenston and crossed under the Glasgow, Paisley, Kilmarnock and Ayr Railway to reach the Doura coal pit. The 1/2-mile (800-metre) North Fergus Hill branch left the Doura branch at South Fergushill, just after the Lugton Water crossing to reach the Fergus Hill coal pit. Crossing gates were located at Dirrans, Corsehill, Saughtrees and Fergushill. Clonbeith siding was located near the Fergushill gates. The Fergushill drive entrance into the Eglinton Estate passed Chapelholm Woods was carried over the railway by a bridge; this has since been demolished.

The line would have been involved in the transportation of visitors to the famous Eglinton Tournament of 1839. The section beyond the terminus station at Dirrens was for coal, however the Earl seems to have had a private station at Millburn. The ruins of Millburn station are still extant. Between 28 July 1834 and September 1835 over 21,000 people had been carried on the railway using the regular passenger service. By the late 1830s the annual figure was around 30,000.

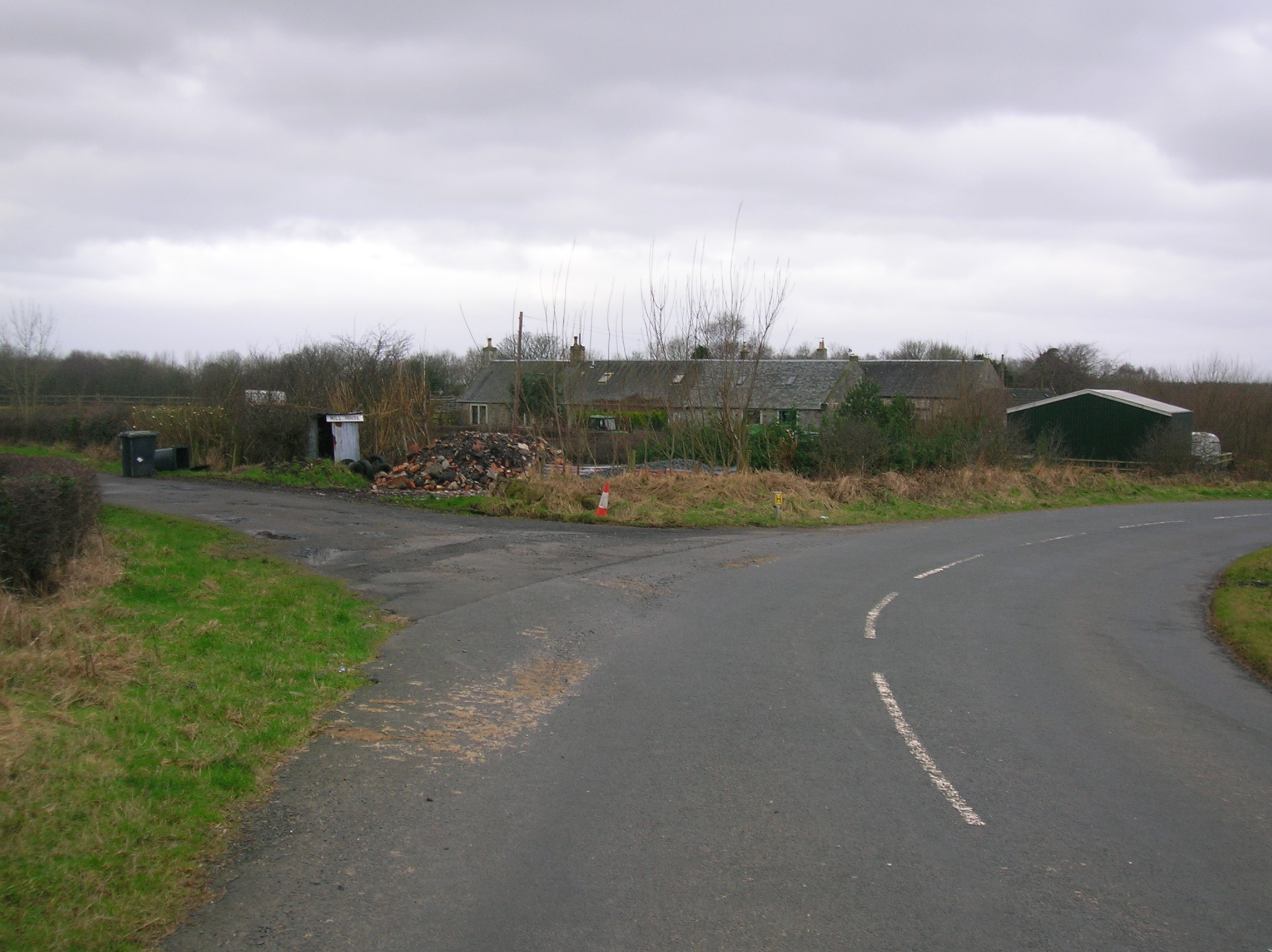
Mill Cottages, South Fergushill and the Chapelholme Drive to Eglinton Country Park.

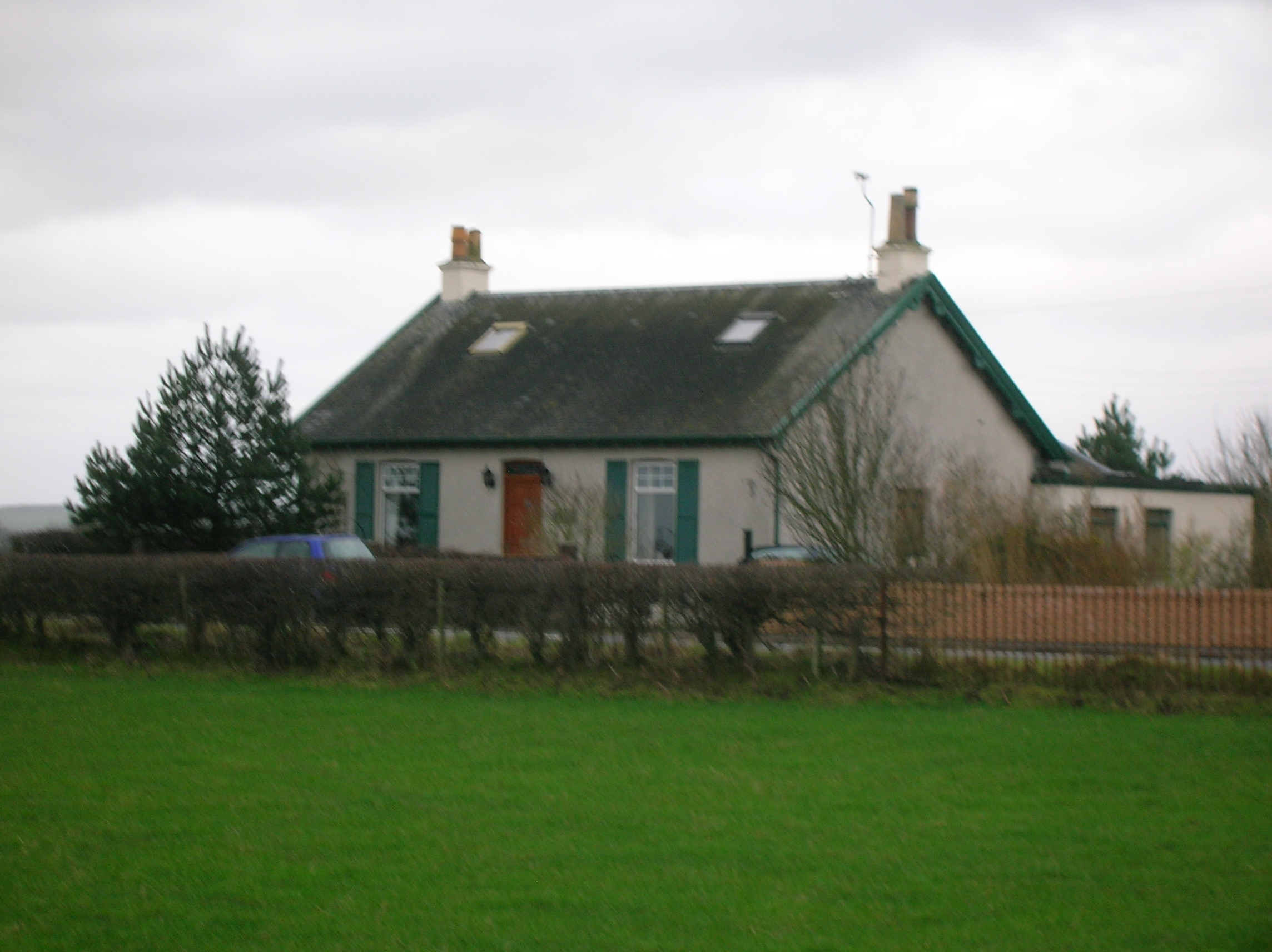
The old Fergushill school house.

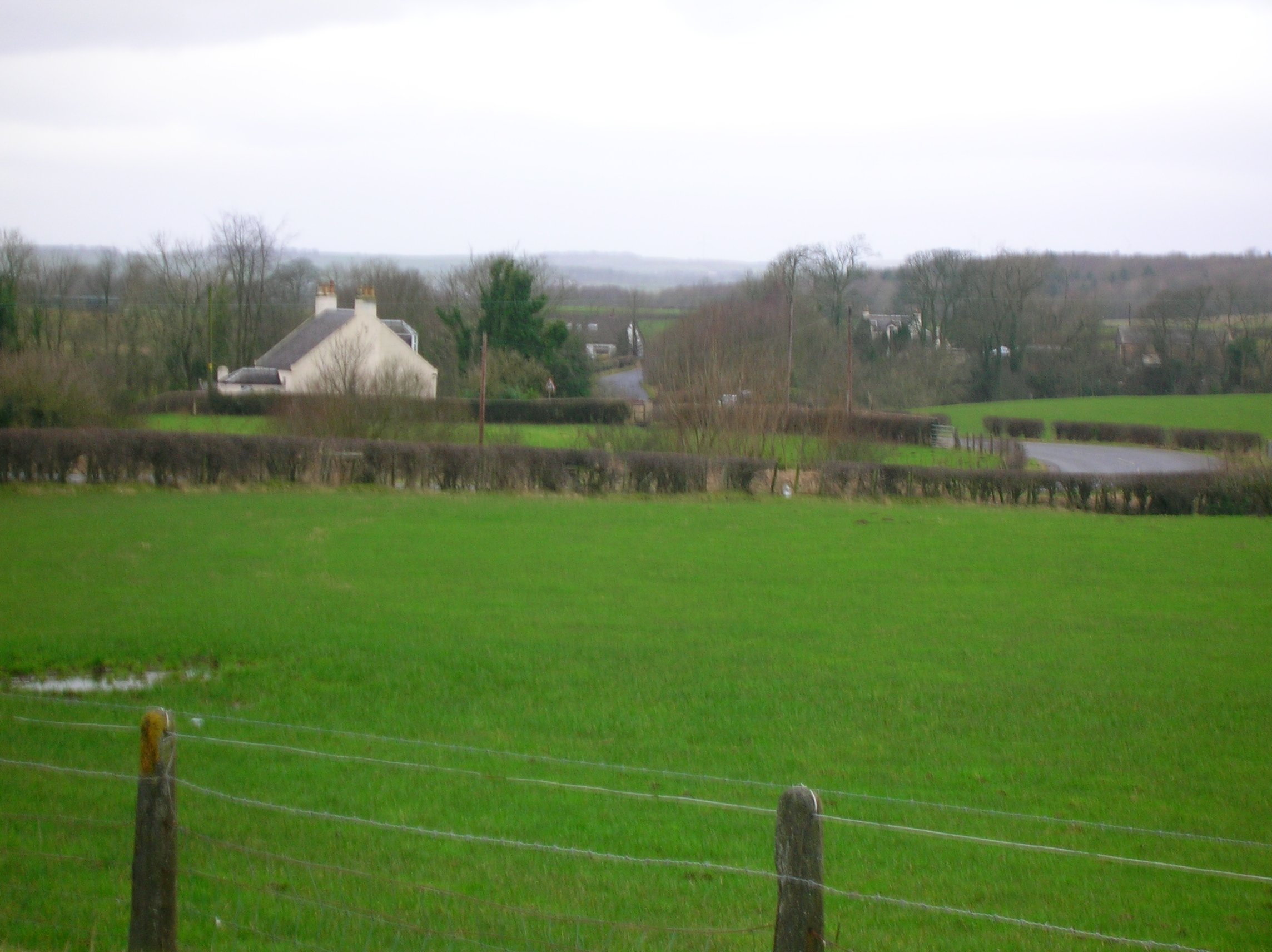
Fergushill cottage looking towards Kilwinning.

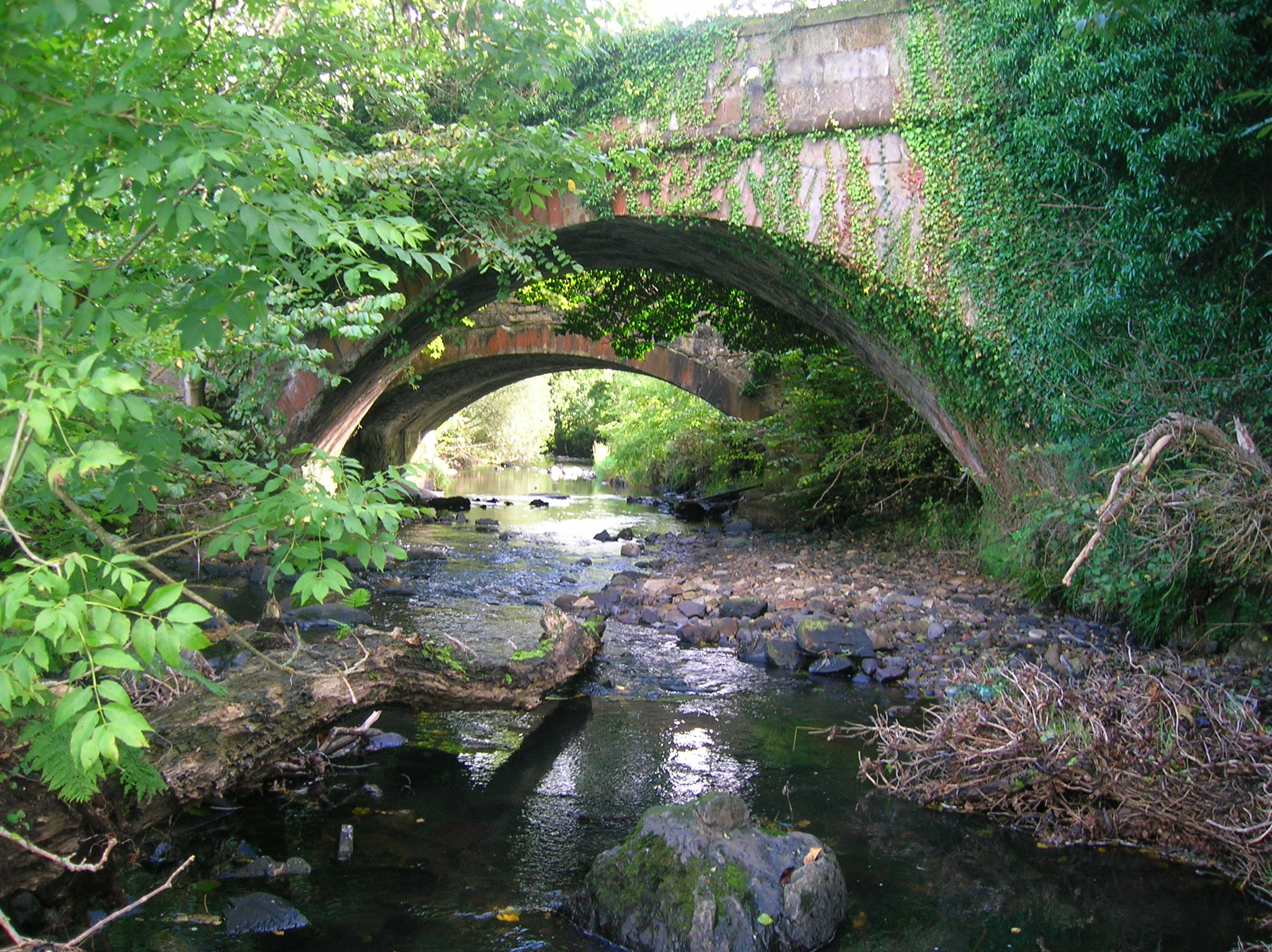
The 19th-century waggonway bridge (foreground) over the Lugton Water near Fergushill farm.

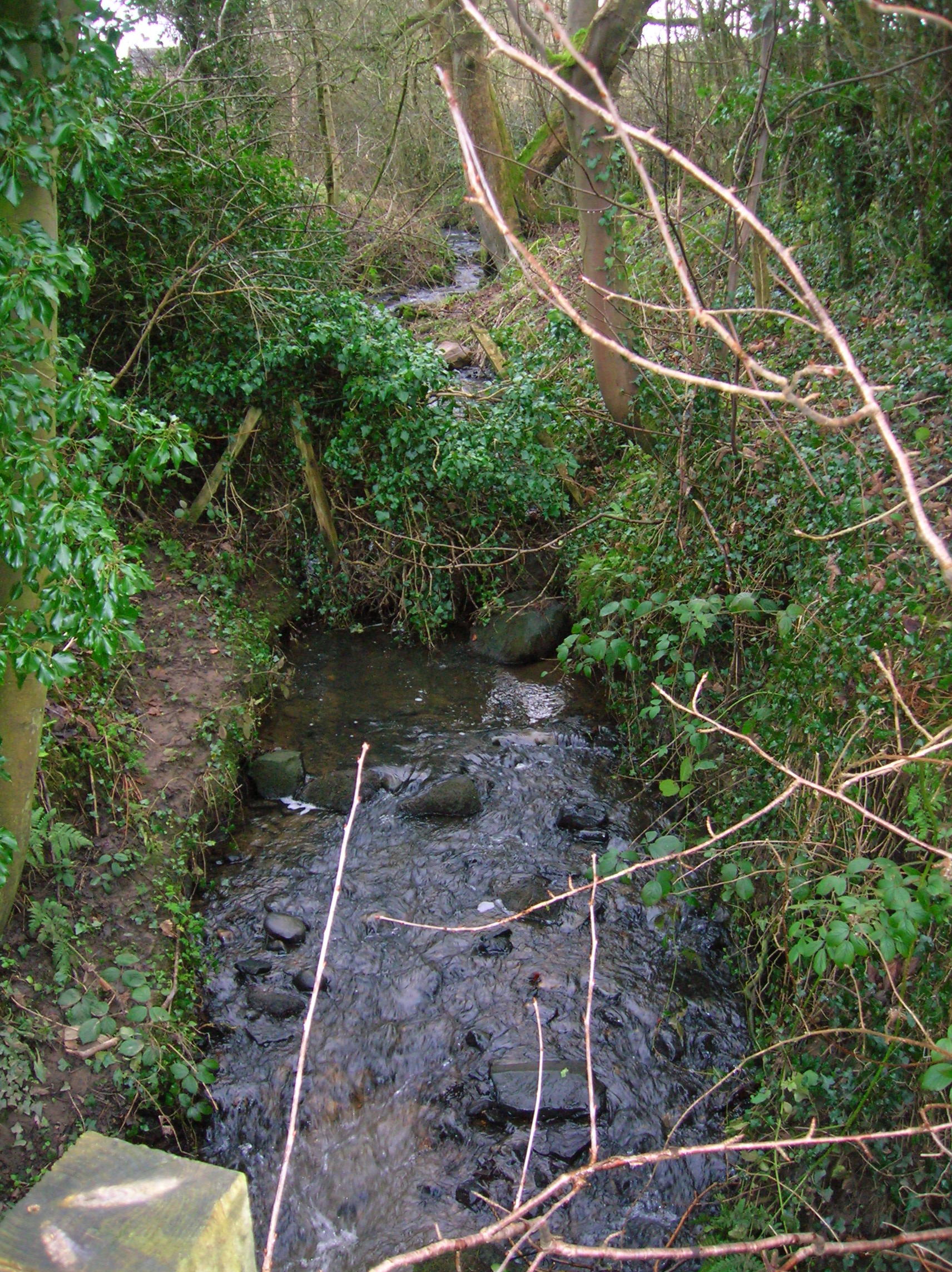
The Fergushill Burn where it joins the Lugton Water.

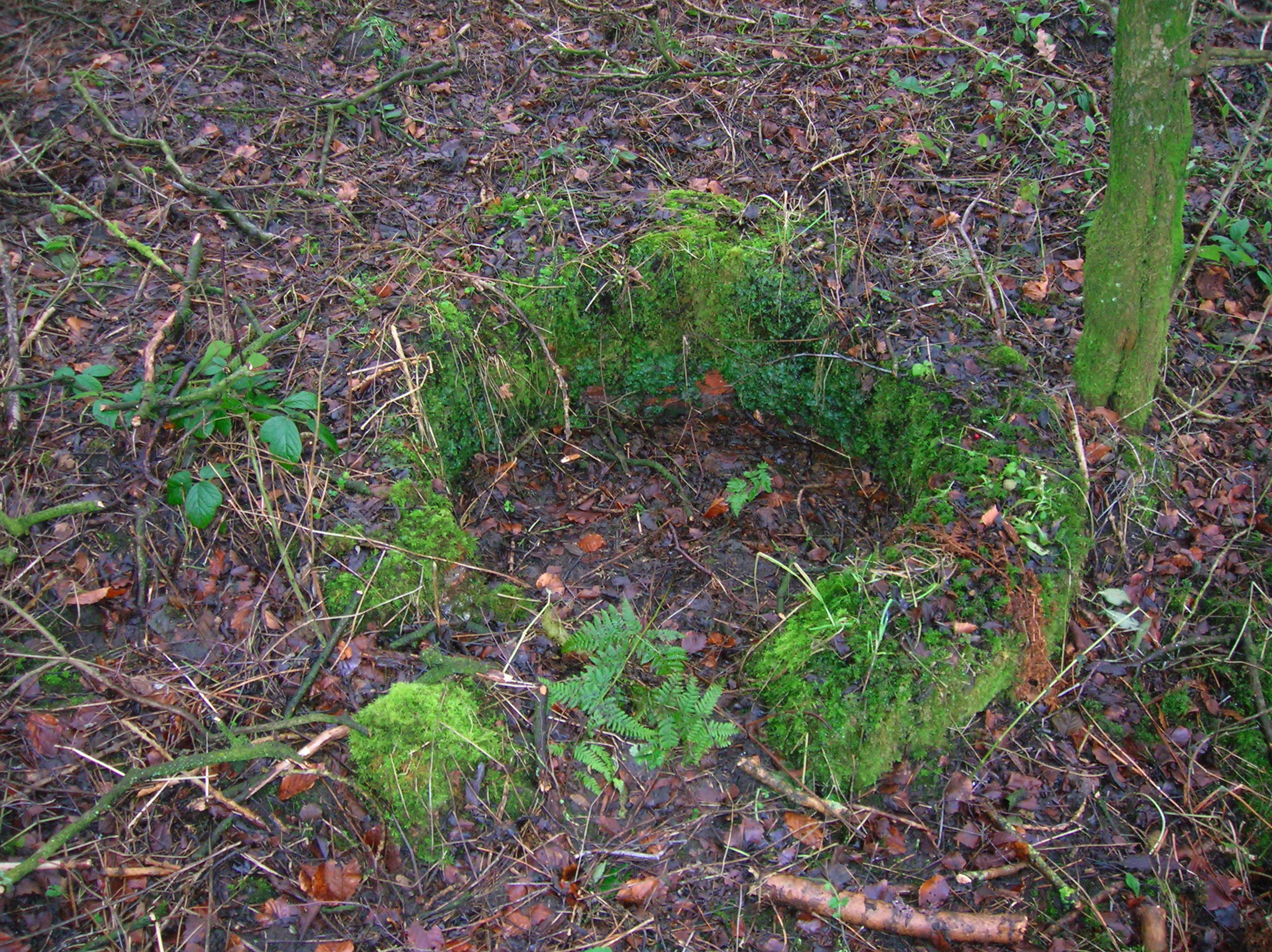
The old well in the woods near Fergushill cottage.

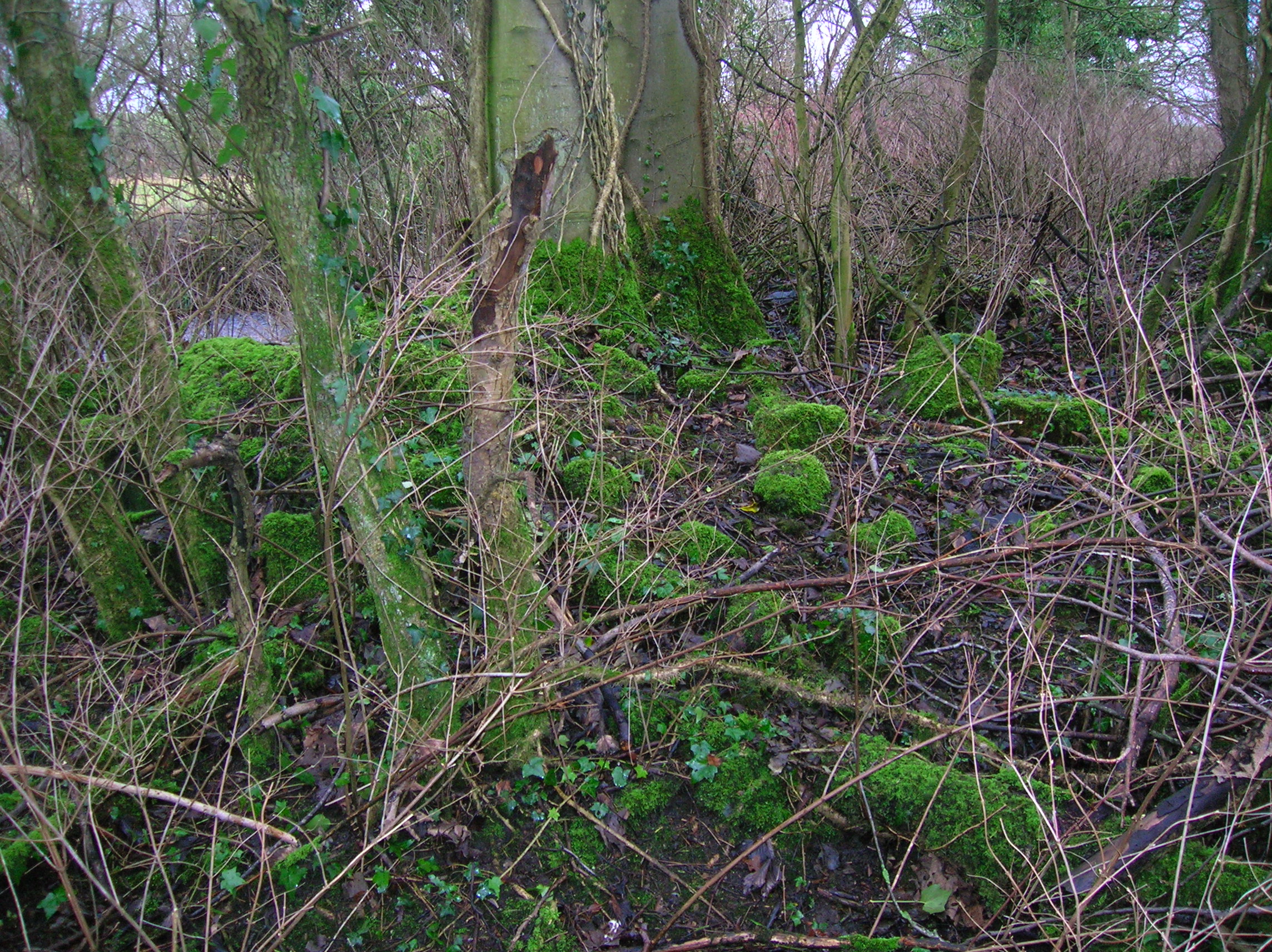
The ruins of old Fergushill Cottage.

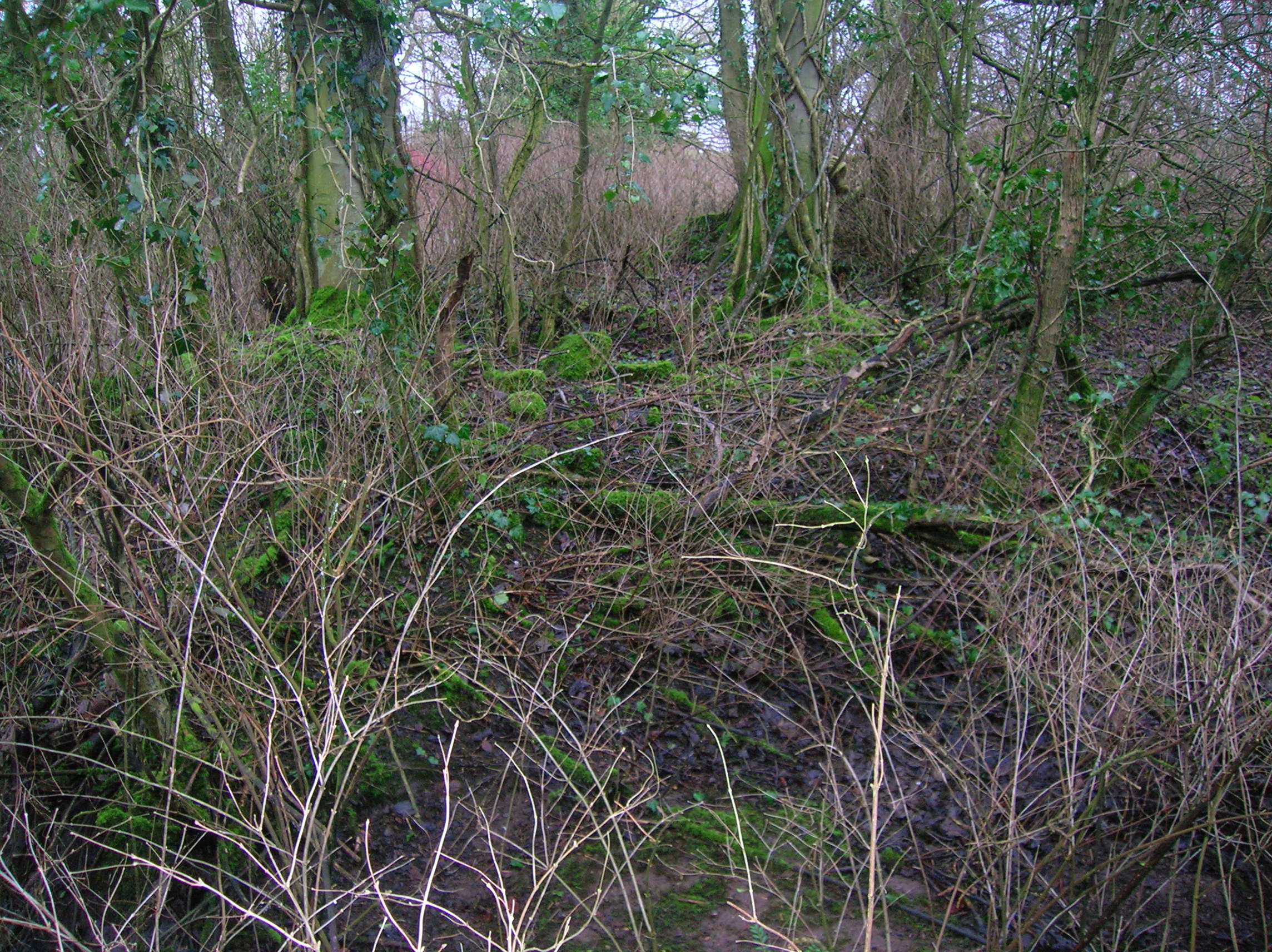
The ruins of old Fergushill Cottage and its garden remnants.

=== Fergushill tileworks ===
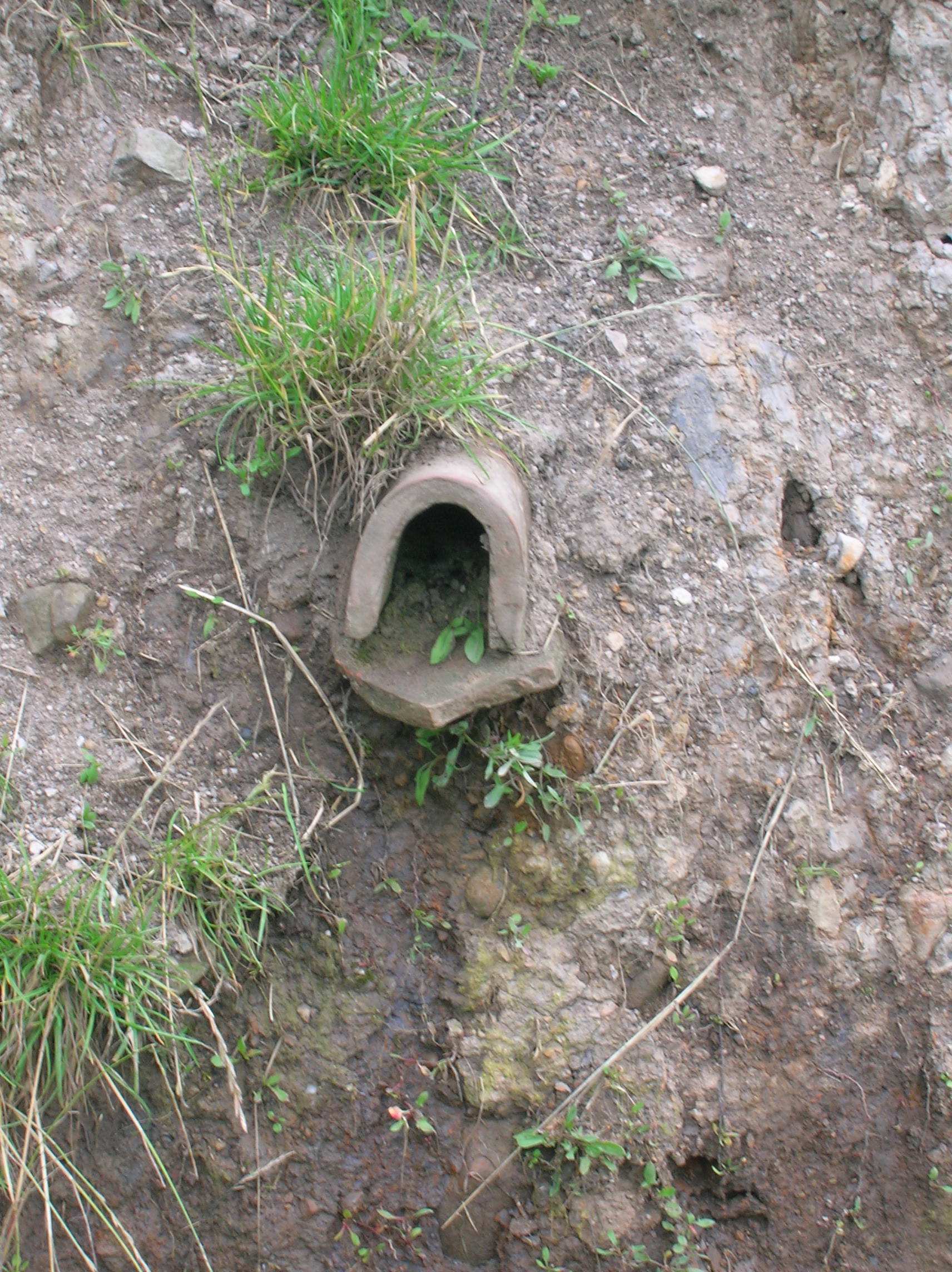
Typical mug and sole drain (Scotland, 18th century) from South Auchenmade moss.

These tileworks was built in 1831 at North Fergushill farm and consisted of a moulding room, kiln and drying stores. The tileworks were in a field just to the east of an unclassified road between North Fergushill farm and the old Dalry to Kilmarnock railway line. The first manager of the Tilework appears to be a Hugh Bunton or Buntine. Bunton probably lived at the adjacent Tilework Cottage. From September 1836 to the end of 1837 the Eglinton Estate purchased between 5,000 and 10,000 tiles per month for use on its farms.

The fate of the tileworks is revealed in the memoranda from George Johnston, the Earl of Eglinton's factor, to the Earl's Commissioner, Mr Gairdner. By the end of 1852 demand for tiles had fallen considerably, production however was not reduced. George Johnston noted there were 480,000 unsold tiles stored at Fergushill and there was no room for the next year's stock. The 1855 OS map notes the tilework is disused. The old clay pit site is now a large pond, and Tilework Cottage is a privately owned house.

== See also ==
- Benslie
- Eglinton Country Park
- Industry and the Eglinton Castle estate
- Lands of Doura
