= John Cameron (theologian) =

Scottish theologian, died 1625

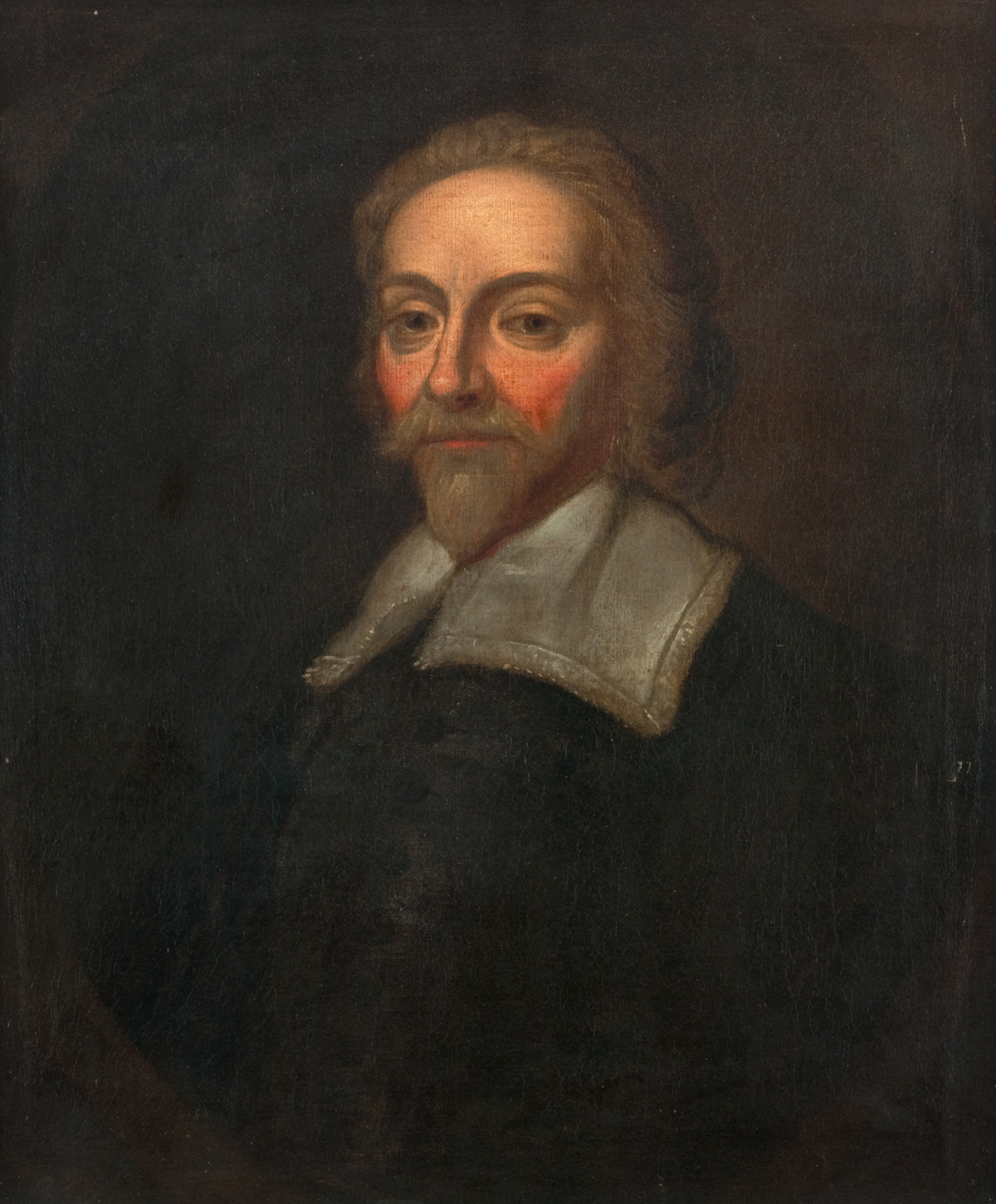
- Born: c. 1579; Glasgow
- Died: 1625
- Education: University of Glasgow
- Occupation: theologian

John Cameron (c. 1579 – 1625) was a Scottish theologian.

== Life and academic career ==
Cameron was born in the Saltmarket district of Glasgow the son of Thomas Cameron and received his early education in his native city. He entered Glasgow University in 1595 and graduated MA in 1599.

After having taught Greek in the university for twelve months, he removed to Bordeaux, where he was soon appointed a regent in the college of Bergerac. He did not remain long at Bordeaux, but accepted the offer of a chair of philosophy at the Academy of Sedan, where he passed two years. He then returned to Bordeaux, and in the beginning of 1604 he was nominated one of the students of divinity who were maintained, at the expense of the church, and who for the period of four years were at liberty to prosecute their studies in any Protestant seminary. During this period he acted as tutor to the two sons of the chancellor of Navarre. They spent one year at Paris, and two at Geneva, whence they removed to Heidelberg. In this university, on 4 April 1608, he gave a public proof of his ability by maintaining a series of theses, De triplici Dei cum Homine Foedere, which were printed among his works. The same year he was recalled to Bordeaux, where he was appointed the colleague of Dr Gilbert Primrose; and when Francis Gomarus was removed to Leiden, Cameron, in 1618, was appointed professor of divinity at the Academy of Saumur, the principal seminary of the French Protestants.

In 1620, the progress of the civil troubles in France obliged Cameron to seek refuge for himself and family in England. For a short time, he read private lectures on divinity in London; and in 1622 the king appointed him principal of the University of Glasgow in the room of Robert Boyd, who had been removed from his office in consequence of his adherence to Presbyterianism. Cameron was cordially disliked for his adherence to the doctrine of passive obedience. He resigned his office in less than a year.

He returned to France, and lived at Saumur. After an interval of a year he was appointed professor of divinity at Montauban. The country was still torn by civil and religious dissensions; and Cameron excited the indignation of the more strenuous adherents of his own party. He withdrew to the neighboring town of Moissac; but he soon returned to Montauban, and a few days afterwards he died at the age of about forty-six and perhaps at the hands of an assassin. All his works were published after his death.

== Theology ==
Cameron's name has a distinct place in the development of Calvinistic theology in Europe. He and his followers maintained that the will of man is determined by the practical judgment of the mind; that the cause of men's doing good or evil proceeds from the knowledge which God infuses into them; and that God does not move the will physically, but only morally, by virtue of its dependence on the judgment of the mind. This peculiar doctrine of grace and free will was adopted by Amyraut, Cappel, Bochart, Daillé and others of the more learned among the Reformed ministers.

The Cameronites (not to be confused with the Scottish sect called Cameronians) are moderate Calvinists. They are also wrongly called Universalists, as holding the universal scope [not application] rather than limited extent of Christ's death, and sometimes Amyraldians. The rigid adherents to the Synod of Dort accused them of Pelagianism, and even of Manichaeism, and the controversy between the parties was carried on with great zeal; yet the whole question between them was only, whether the will of man is determined by the immediate action of God upon it, or by the intervention of a knowledge which God impresses on the mind.

== Family ==
Cameron married twice:

Firstly in 1611 to Suzanne Bernadin of Tonneins and had one son, who died in infancy. Secondly in 1625 to Jeanne de Thomas, daughter of Jacques de Thomas, advocate, and widow of Dr Jean Gautier MD.

== Literature ==
- Axel Hilmar Swinne: John Cameron - Philosoph und Theologe (1579-1625): bibliographisch-kritische Analyse der Hand- und Druckschriften sowie der Cameron-Literatur. Studia Irenica volume 1. N. G. Elwert Verlag, Marburg 1968.
