= John Fergushill =

The Reverend John Fergushill
- Church: Church of Scotland

Orders
- Ordination: 1614

Personal details
- Born: ca 1592 Ayr, Scotland
- Died: 11 June 1644 (aged 51–52) Ayr, Scotland
- Education: University of Edinburgh; University of Glasgow

John Fergushill (1592–1644), was a 17th-century Minister of the Church of Scotland who supported the 1638 National Covenant and was an associate of Presbyterian fundamentalists, including Archibald Johnson. He died on 11 June 1644. (Note: Not to be confused with another John Fergushill, who was shot dead in 1685 and is commemorated by a monument erected at Fenwick kirk.)

== Life ==
John Fergushill was born in 1592, the only son of David Fergushill, merchant and Provost or Chief Magistrate of Ayr and Janet Kennedy. He began his studies at Edinburgh University in 1601, at the age of nine but an outbreak of plague resulted in him being sent to complete his studies in France. In 1604, his father wrote to a family connection, Robert Boyd, then Professor of Philosophy at the French Huguenot university of Montauban, asking him to supervise John's schooling.

However, he spent the next year studying in Bordeaux, before returning to Scotland in 1605; in a letter of 29 December 1608 to Boyd, he explains the delays in his schooling as due to 'the weakness of my body and especially my eyes.' This was clearly successful, since he completed his degree in theology at the University of Glasgow and appointed Church of Scotland minister at Ochiltree in 1614. He is recorded as having completed his qualification as a minister and being certified by the Presbytery in Glasgow in September 1616.

Fergushill married twice, first to Agnes Eccles, then to Annabel Wallace. He died in Ayr on 11 June 1644, aged about 52.

== Background and career ==
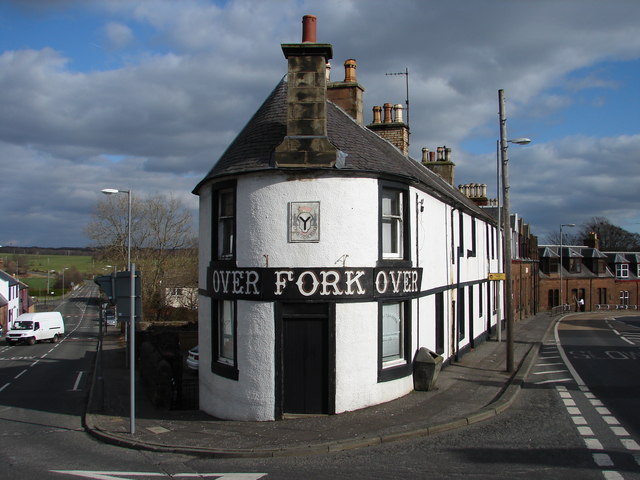
Modern-day Ochiltree; Fergushill was minister for the parish 1614–1639.

Fergushill was ordained at a time of intense conflict over religion; the 1562-1598 French Wars of Religion caused over three million deaths from war and disease, followed by the 1618-1648 Thirty Years' War, one of the most destructive conflicts in recorded history, with an estimated eight million deaths. In Britain, similar arguments over religious practices would ultimately lead to the 1638-1652 Wars of the Three Kingdoms.

The 1637 Book of Common Prayer led to the 1638 National Covenant.

Like most Scots, James VI was a Calvinist but he favoured rule by bishops or Episcopalian governance as a means of control; when he also became King of England in 1603, he saw a unified Church of Scotland and England as the first step towards a centralised, Unionist state. However, the Church of England was very different from the kirk in both governance and doctrine and even Scottish bishops viewed many English practices as essentially Catholic.

On 10 March 1615, John Ogilvie, a Scottish Jesuit convert, was executed in Glasgow; his 'fall' was of particular concern, since he came from an upper class, Calvinist Scots family and studied at the Protestant University of Helmstedt before his conversion. It fuelled the debate over James' proposed reforms or the Five Articles of Perth, particularly the re-introduction of kneeling; while only a minority viewed this as idolatry, many others argued that Olgivie demonstrated the danger of such 'Popish' practices, even for the educated devout.

In 1618, the General Assembly of the Church of Scotland reluctantly approved the Articles but they were widely resented. Fergushill was actively involved in this debate and in March 1620, he and 48 other ministers were summoned to appear before the Scottish High Commission, an ecclesiastical court of bishops and sympathetic ministers established to enforce the Articles. The accused were found guilty but all denied the authority of the Court to discipline them; Robert Boyd wrote to the Court on Fergushill's behalf, urging clemency.

Fergushill was allowed to return to Ochiltree, on condition that he not administer Communion to his congregation, a restriction that was ignored; he remained there until 1639, when he transferred to Ayr. He was an associate of radicals like Archibald Johnson who formulated the 1638 National Covenant and part of the General Assembly that expelled bishops from the kirk and led to the 1638-1639 Bishop's Wars.
