= Reformed orthodoxy =

Era in the history of Calvinism

Reformed orthodoxy or Calvinist orthodoxy was an era in the history of Calvinism in the 16th to 18th centuries. Calvinist orthodoxy was paralleled by similar eras in Lutheranism and tridentine Roman Catholicism after the Counter-Reformation. Calvinist scholasticism or Reformed scholasticism was a theological method that gradually developed during the era of Calvinist Orthodoxy.

Theologians used the neo-Aristotelian form of presentation, already popular in academia, in their writings and lectures. They defined the Reformed faith and defended it against the polemics of opposing parties. While the Reformed often used "scholastic" as a term of derision for their Roman Catholic opponents and the content of their theology, most Reformed theologians during this period can properly be called scholastics with respect to the method of theology, though they also used other methods. J. V. Fesko describes scholasticism in this sense as "a method of doing theology that sets out to achieve theological precision through the exegesis of Scripture, an examination of how doctrine has been historically defined throughout church history, and how doctrine is expounded in contemporary debate."

== Continuity in Reformed theology ==
Part of the series on
Modern scholasticism
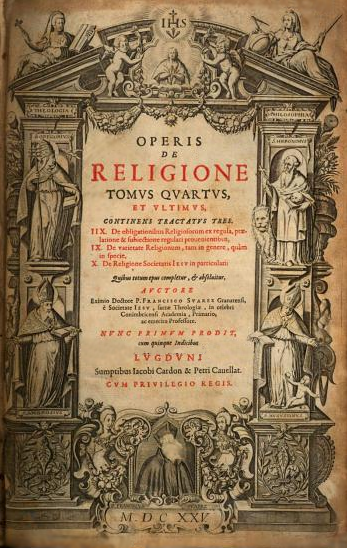
Title page of the Operis de religione (1625) from Francisco Suárez
Background

Protestant Reformation
Counter-Reformation
Aristotelianism
Scholasticism
Patristics

Modern scholastics

Second scholasticism of the School of Salamanca
Lutheran scholasticism during Lutheran orthodoxy
Ramism among the Reformed orthodoxy
Metaphysical poets in the Church of England

Reactions within Christianity

Jesuits against Jansenism
Labadists against the Jesuits
Pietism against orthodox Lutherans
Nadere Reformatie within Dutch Calvinism
Richard Hooker against the Ramists

Reactions within philosophy

Neologists against Lutherans
Spinozists against Dutch Calvinists
Deists against Anglicanism
John Locke against Bishop Stillingfleet

In the past, scholars described the theology of Protestant scholastics following John Calvin as more rationalistic and philosophical than the more exegetical biblical theology of John Calvin and other early Reformers. This is commonly described as the "Calvin against the Calvinists" paradigm. Beginning in the 1980s, Richard Muller and other scholars in the field provided extensive evidence showing both that the early Reformers were deeply influenced by scholasticism and that later Reformed scholasticism was deeply exegetical, using the scholastic method to organize and explicate exegetical theology.

== Scholastic method ==
Medieval schools of theology used methods of instruction known as lectio-meditatio-quaestio and disputationes. In the first method, teachers would first read an authoritative text with some commentary (lectio), allow students to consider the text silently (meditatio), and finally the students would ask questions of the teacher to get at the meaning (quaestio).

== History ==
Scholasticism was used by Protestant theologians primarily from 1560 to 1790, which is known as the period of orthodoxy because of the importance of adherence to and defense of the newly written Reformed confessions of faith for these theologians.

=== John Calvin (1509–1564) ===
John Calvin, unlike other early reformers like Martin Luther, was not formally trained in theology; while Calvin was trained in law, Luther was trained in both law and theology. Like many early reformers, however, he was influenced by Renaissance humanism, which led to an interest in the original meaning of biblical and patristic texts and criticism of medieval scholastics for straying from this meaning in favor of philosophical distinctions. Analysis of his work, however, shows that he found himself using some of the same distinctions employed by the scholastics, and some of the criticisms he made of scholastic theology may have actually been based on his own misunderstanding. It is clear, however, that Calvin's use of scholastic theology is different in that, while medieval scholastic theology was solely employed by professional theologians in the schools, rather than by ordinary clergy in preaching, Calvin saw theological teaching as one of the primary objectives of the church and intended his theological works to be used by both preachers and common people. Many of his criticisms of purely speculative scholastic theology may be seen as a consequence of his desire to make theology accessible and useful for the church rather than solely for professional theologians in the schools.

=== Early orthodoxy (1560–1620) ===
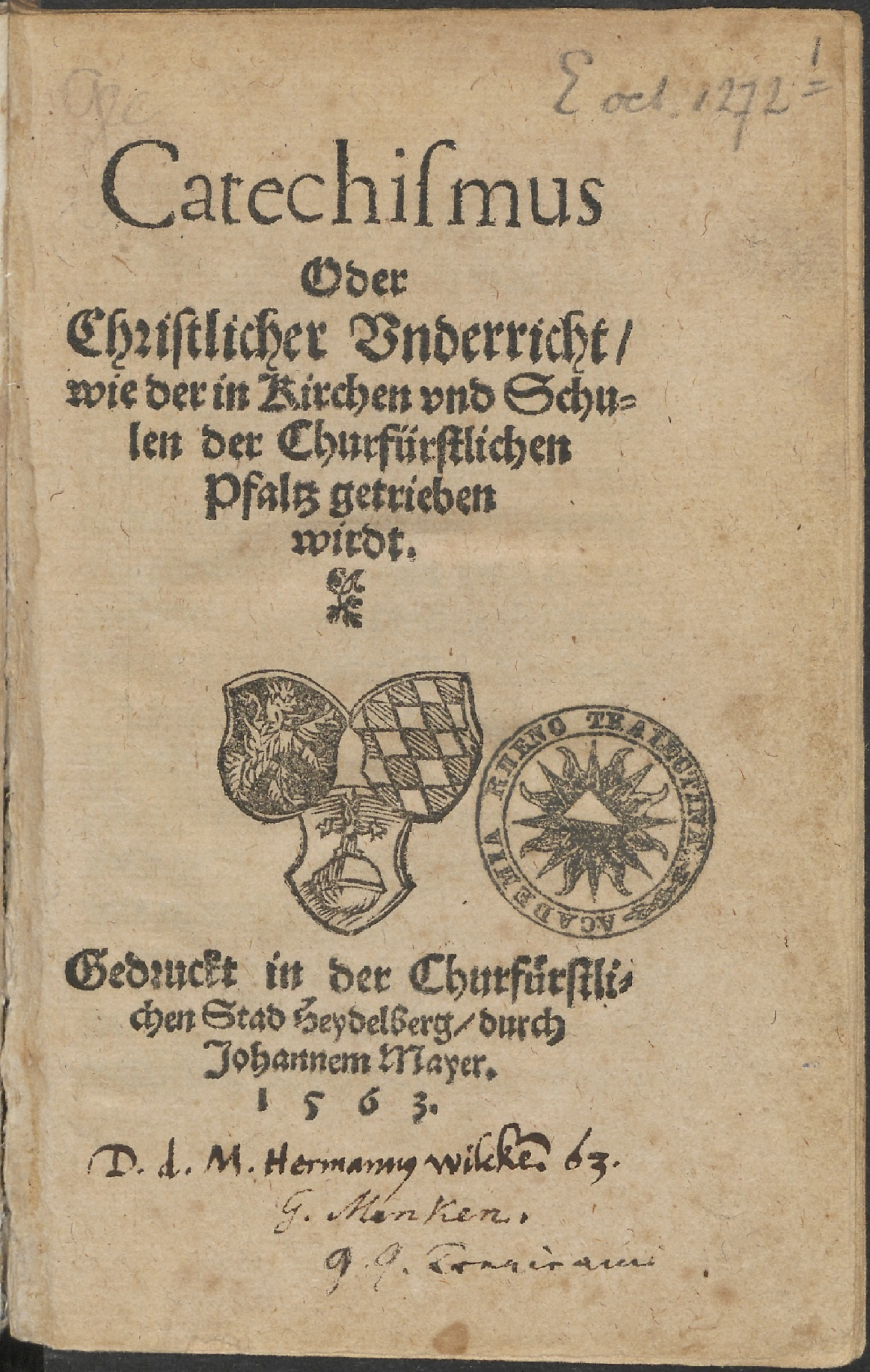
The Heidelberg Catechism

Though scholasticism can already be seen in early Reformed theologians, especially Vermigli and to some degree Calvin, it became much more prevalent during the third and fourth generations of Reformed theologians as a tool to institutionalize the faith by codifying it in confessions and works of systematic theology, as well as to combat the growing sophistication of counter-Reformation polemicists. Reformed confessions of faith such as the Heidelberg Catechism of 1563 (commissioned by Elector Frederick III of the Palatinate), the Belgic Confession of 1561, and the French Gallican Confession of 1559 served as boundary markers for the new faith and as starting places for theological development. The formation of the Genevan Academy in 1559 also enabled Reformed theologians to receive extensive academic training and participate in the wider academic theological discourse. It also served as a model for other Reformed institutions of higher learning throughout Europe. Counter-Reformation attacks from Roman Catholic writers such as Jesuit Cardinal Robert Bellarmine were written in the tradition of scholasticism and needed to be answered in kind. Reformed theologians such as Heidelberg professors Zacharias Ursinus and Girolamo Zanchi adopted the tools of scholastic theology such as the quaestio method to rigorously exposit the Reformed confessions.

The early 17th-century Arminian controversy, in which a group known as the Remonstrants argued that predestination to salvation is based on God foreseeing a person's faith, brought about the Synod of Dort, which defined the Reformed doctrine on this matter in greater detail. The 1594 treatise by Huguenot theologian Franciscus Junius On True Theology was the first Protestant work to distinguish archetypal theology (God's knowledge of himself) and ectypal theology (our knowledge of God based on his condescending revelation to us). This distinction, which has its roots in the medieval Scotist distinction between theology in itself (theologia in se) and our theology (theologia nostra), limits the degree to which God can be known by sinful man and became important in later Reformed and Lutheran theology.

Through the influence of refugees from continental Europe such as Martin Bucer and Peter Martyr Vermigli, late 16th century English theology was predominately Reformed in nature, though Arminianism gained dominance after 1700. Puritans William Perkins and William Ames were important figures in Reformed English theology during this period. Reformed theologians at the University of St. Andrews assured Calvinism's hold on Scotland.

=== High orthodoxy (1620–1700) ===
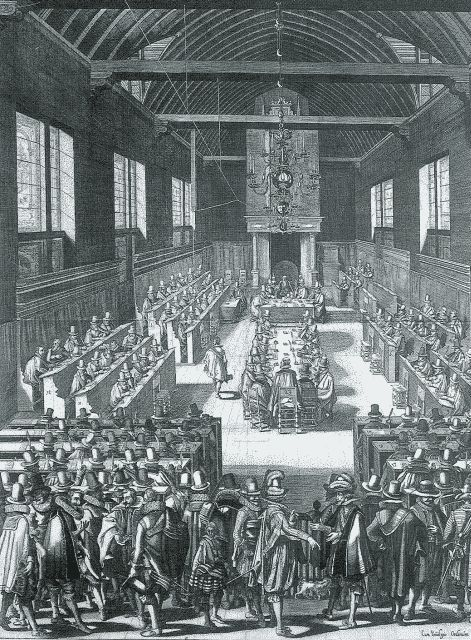
The Synod held at Dort

Following the Synod of Dort, which ended in 1619, the Reformed began to give greater definition and detail to their theological system by writing comprehensive systematic theologies. The period was also characterized by intense polemical writing against several groups. The Remonstrants, having been repudiated in the synod of Dort, became an independent movement with their own seminary and dogmatic textbooks, and the Reformed wrote against them with even greater intensity. Reformed polemics were also directed against the increasingly influential Socinians, who denied the Trinity and other traditional Christian doctrines. Early Socinians had already had some influence on the development of Remonstrantism during the early orthodox period. In addition, the rise of Cartesianism provided another target for Reformed scholastics such as Dutch theologian Gisbertus Voetius, who argued that Descartes's philosophical skepticism placed reason above revelation instead of subjecting reason to biblical revelation.

In the Netherlands, three strands within Reformed orthodoxy may be distinguished, though all of these stayed within the boundaries provided by the Canons of Dort. The theologia traditiva was most notably represented by Samuel Maresius and Friedrich Spanheim the Elder and Younger. This strain was in many ways aligned with a second strain, the school of Voetius. Unlike the Voetians, however, the followers of the theologia traditiva were infralapsarian, arguing that God's decree to create men and allow the Fall logically precedes the decree to elect some men to salvation. They also, contrary to the Voetians, approved of some degree of governmental involvement in church affairs, were more lax with respect to Sabbath observance, and were in general more moderate polemicists. Differences between these groups decreased throughout the 17th century, as they positioned themselves against a third strain, the Cocceians. The school of Johannes Cocceius differed from the Voetians and the rest of Reformed scholastic theology in teaching on the relationship of the Old and New Testament. The Cocceians taught that the Sabbath commandment was abrogated in the New Covenant and had other disagreements regarding the relationship between the covenant of works and the covenant of grace. Though Cocceius himself rejected Cartesianism, some of his followers were influenced by it and this led to even more suspicion of the Coccieans on behalf of the rest of the Reformed.

In France, Moses Amyraut at the Academy of Saumur taught a doctrine known as Amyraldism which is considered a compromise between the doctrine of predestination presented at the Synod of Dort and that of Arminianism. Amyraut taught that God elects to salvation in two ways. First, the entire human race is elected to salvation on condition of their faith in him. Then, based on his foreknowledge that no one would have faith, God elects some to salvation in a second, particular election. Most Reformed scholastics rejected Amyraut's views, arguing that it was a return to Arminianism because the first decree of election was conditional on faith. The Swiss Formula consensus Helvetica was written primarily by Johann Heinrich Heidegger with help from Francis Turretin to repudiate Amyraldism.

In England, many of the Reformed, along with some other Protestants refused to remain within the Anglican church and were thus known as Nonconformists. They were divided between Presbyterians (who maintained a hierarchical church government), Independents or Congregationalists (who advocated the autonomy of local churches), and Baptists (who through the influence of Dutch Anabaptists practiced only believer's baptism). The 1647 Westminster Confession of Faith established a consensus among them.

=== Late orthodoxy (1700–1790) ===
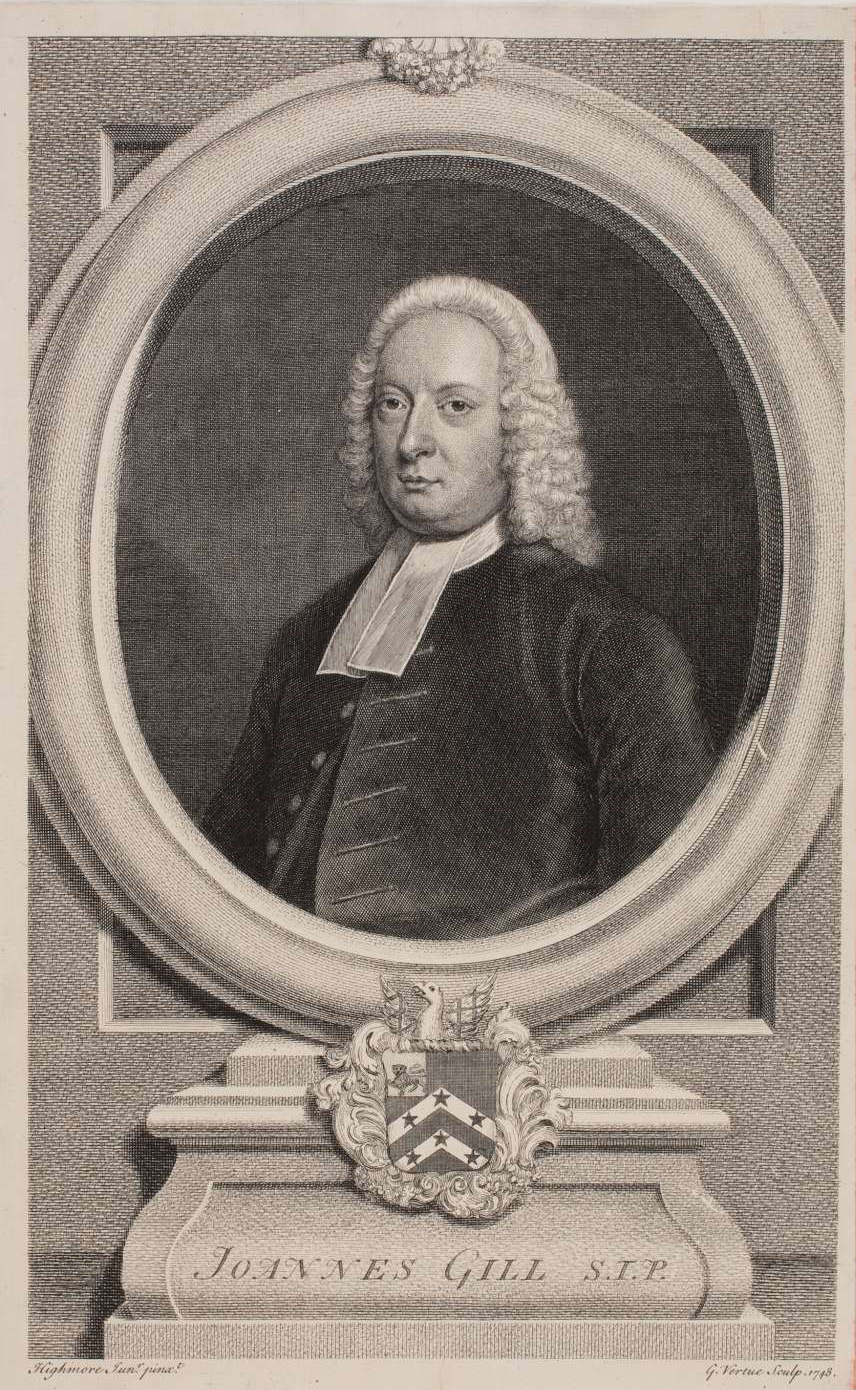
John Gill was a significant particular Baptist theologian in the late orthodox period.

During the eighteenth century the scholastic method of theology began to stagnate in favor of exegetical and historical theology. The Age of Enlightenment brought about greater reliance on reason and less dependence on the authority of authoritative texts such as the Bible, leading to the rise of biblical criticism and natural theology.

In the Netherlands the "Green Cocceians" (named after Henricus Groenewegen, Groen = Green in Dutch) surpassed the Voetians who had been dominant in the 17th century. They attempted to find a mediating position between Enlightenment thought and Reformed theology, which resulted in intense controversy with other Reformed scholastics. Enlightenment thought was even more influential in Germany and England, leading to the rise of deism, biblical criticism, and rationalism at the expense of scholastic modes of thinking. John Gill defended the English particular Baptists, who taught the Reformed doctrine of limited atonement, from the influence of Arminianism and Socianism and is considered one of the most important Reformed scholastics of the 18th century.

Reformed scholastic theology was more dominant in Scotland. The Marrow Controversy, which began in 1718, was caused by disagreements between so-called the neonomians and antinomians over the relationship of the covenant of works and covenant of grace. The opposing sides often used scholastic distinctions and methods. The controversy ended with the split of the Church of Scotland and the establishment of the Associate Presbytery.

In Switzerland the Enlightenment had a significant impact on the shape of Reformed theology. Jean Alphonse Turretin, son of high orthodox scholastic Francis Turretin, along with Jean-Frédéric Osterwald and Samuel Werenfels rejected the doctrine of predestination, the Synod of Dort, and the Helvetic Consensus.

== Important figures ==
- Wilhelmus à Brakel
- John Owen
- Francis Turretin
- Peter Martyr Vermigli
- Gisbertus Voetius
- Hermann Witsius
- Johannes Wollebius
- Girolamo Zanchi

== See also ==
- Lutheran orthodoxy
- Protestant scholasticism
