= Limited atonement =

Reformed doctrine that Christ's substitutionary death was for the elect alone

Limited atonement (also called definite atonement or particular redemption) is a doctrine in Reformed theology holding that Christ's substitutionary atonement was specifically and effectively aimed at securing the salvation of the elect alone, rather than being merely hypothetically available to all humanity. It encompasses not just forgiveness of sin, but every saving benefit—regeneration, faith, and final perseverance.

It is the third point of the five points of Calvinism (TULIP), codified in the Canons of Dort (1619), the Westminster Confession of Faith (1646), and the 1689 Baptist Confession of Faith.

It contrasts with unlimited atonement, which teaches Christ died equally for everyone, making salvation conditionally available to all who believe. Hypothetical universalists (Amyraldians, or "four-point Calvinists") also reject it, holding that God decreed a universal atonement while reserving a particular election in its application.

== History ==
=== Patristic and medieval eras ===
Early Christian theologians primarily articulated the atonement through the motifs of cosmic victory (Christus Victor) and the restoration of humanity through the Incarnation (recapitulation). However, during the fifth-century Pelagian controversy, Augustine of Hippo (354–430) placed greater systematic emphasis on the absolute sovereignty of divine grace and unconditional election. In addressing passages such as 1 Timothy 2:4 ("who desires all people to be saved"), Augustine argued that "all" does not denote every individual without exception, but rather all classes, types, and nations of people, or all who are among the predestined elect.

In the ninth century, the Carolingian monk Gottschalk of Orbais (c. 808–867) defended double predestination and asserted that Christ shed His blood exclusively for the elect, contending that if Christ died for the reprobate, His blood was shed in vain for those who perish. Gottschalk's view was condemned at the Synod of Quierzy (853) under the influence of Hincmar of Reims, but partially vindicated at the Synod of Valence (855). Later medieval scholastics, such as Thomas Bradwardine (c. 1290–1349) and Gregory of Rimini (c. 1300–1358), continued to defend strict Augustinian particularism.

During the twelfth century, Peter Lombard (c. 1100–1160) formulated a distinction in his Sentences (Book III, Dist. 20) that became standard for subsequent Western theology: Christ's death was "sufficient for all, but efficient only for the elect" (sufficiens pro omnibus, sed efficax tantum pro electis). This formula was reaffirmed by high medieval scholastics, including Thomas Aquinas in the Summa Theologiae (III, q. 48, a. 2), who affirmed that the sacrifice of Christ possesses infinite intrinsic worth because of His divine person, while its saving efficacy is realized solely in believers.

=== Reformation and Calvin ===
The sixteenth-century Protestant Reformers shifted the primary framework of the atonement toward penal substitution, viewing Christ as bearing the legal curse and penalty of the divine law in the place of sinners.

The exact position of John Calvin (1509–1564) regarding the extent of the atonement is a subject of ongoing historical discussion: A number of historical theologians (including R. T. Kendall and Brian G. Armstrong) contend that Calvin held to universal redemption, arguing that definite atonement was a later scholastic development introduced by his successor, Theodore Beza. Other scholars (such as Paul Helm, and William Cunningham) argue that Calvin consistently employed the traditional Lombardian distinction without developing it into an independent locus, and that his systematic commitments to unconditional election and the unified priestly office of Christ (oblation and intercession) align with the later Reformed consensus.

=== Remonstrant controversy and the Synod of Dort (1618–1619) ===
The extent of the atonement became a central confessional issue during the Dutch Remonstrant controversy in the early seventeenth century. In 1610, the followers of Jacobus Arminius published the Five Articles of Remonstrance, asserting in Article II that Christ died for all humanity conditionally.

To resolve the controversy, the Synod of Dort convened from 1618 to 1619, drawing delegates from the Dutch Republic, England, Scotland, Germany, and Switzerland. The Synod rejected the Remonstrant thesis in its "Second Head of Doctrine: The Death of Christ and the Redemption of Men Thereby."

=== Post-Reformation scholasticism and Amyraldism ===
Following Dort, seventeenth-century Reformed scholastic dogmatics further systematized the doctrine: John Owen published The Death of Death in the Death of Christ (1647), offering a comprehensive defense of definite redemption against Arminians, Socinians, and early hypothetical universalists. Owen structured his arguments around the Covenant of Redemption (pactum salutis) and formulated a famous trilemma arguing that if Christ died for the sins of all men, God's justice cannot condemn the impenitent without demanding double payment for their sins. Francis Turretin addressed the doctrine in his Institutes of Elenctic Theology (1679–1685), linking definite atonement to Christ's united priestly offices of oblation and intercession, and to the legal imputation of guilt within federal theology.

During this same period, Moses Amyraut and the Saumur Academy introduced Amyraldism (hypothetical universalism), proposing that God logically decreed a universal atonement for all humanity antecedent to an unconditional decree of election in its application. Orthodox Reformed dogmaticians rejected Amyraldism as an untenable deviation from the Canons of Dort, leading directly to the drafting of the Formula Consensus Helvetica in 1675.

== Theology ==
=== Federal headship and double imputation ===
In Reformed dogmatics, particular redemption is systematically integrated with covenant theology and the principle of federal headship, drawing a direct parallel between Adam and Christ based on Romans 5:12–21 and 1 Corinthians 15:21–22, 45–47. Reformed theologians maintain that God deals with humanity through representative covenants: Adam served as the federal head of his natural descendants, whose disobedience brought legal condemnation and guilt upon the entire race, while Christ acts as the federal head of the elect in the eternal Covenant of Redemption (pactum salutis). Under this framework, substitutionary atonement involves double imputation: The specific moral liability, guilt, and penalty of the elect's sins were judicially imputed to Christ on the cross. Christ's perfect righteousness—comprising both His active obedience to the law and His passive obedience in undergoing the curse of death—is imputed to the elect for their justification.

Reformed writers argue that if Christ functioned as a federal representative and legal substitute for all individuals without exception, the judicial ground for condemnation would be removed for all humanity, which would logically necessitate universalism.

=== Retributive justice and actual redemption ===
Reformed theologians link definite atonement directly to penal substitution and divine retributive justice. Formulated by writers such as John Owen and Francis Turretin, the argument from divine justice posits that Christ suffered the exact judicial penalty demanded by God's law in the place of His people. Consequently, Reformed dogmatics contends that it would violate divine justice for God to demand payment a second time from unrepentant sinners in hell (an objection frequently referred to as "double payment" or "double jeopardy").

This position is classically stated via Owen's trilemma regarding the extent of the cross: Christ died for all the sins of all men; Christ died for all the sins of some men; or Christ died for some of the sins of all men. Owen argued that if the third is true, no one can be saved; if the first is true, all must be saved (or God is unjust for punishing sins already atoned for); therefore, the second must be true. Under this model, the cross did not merely render salvation hypothetically possible, but achieved an actual redemption, securing reconciliation, the gift of faith, and final perseverance for the elect Westminster Confession of Faith.

=== Trinitarian harmony in the economy of salvation ===
A prominent systematic argument for particular redemption is the internal harmony of the Trinity in the work of salvation (the ordo salutis). Reformed dogmatics emphasizes that the external works of the Trinity are indivisible (opera Trinitatis ad extra indivisa sunt), meaning the three persons of the Godhead act with a unified intent and identical scope in redemption: The Father unconditionally chooses a definite people to salvation. The Son redeems and atones specifically for those chosen by the Father. The Holy Spirit effectually calls, regenerates, and applies salvation to that same elect body.

Reformed theologians argue that proposing a universal atonement within a Calvinist soteriological framework introduces a disharmony into the divine will, positing that the Son purposed to redeem a wider group than the Father decreed to elect or the Spirit determines to regenerate.

=== Unity of Christ's priestly offices: Oblation and intercession ===
In Reformed Christology, the priestly office of Christ consists of two indivisible parts: His sacrificial offering on earth (oblation) and His continual heavenly advocacy (intercession). Drawing on the typological pattern of the Levitical High Priest on the Day of Atonement, Reformed writers emphasize that the high priest only interceded for the specific covenant community for whom the sacrifice was offered.

Because Christ explicitly limits the scope of His High Priestly prayer in John 17:9 ("I pray for them. I am not praying for the world, but for those whom you have given me"), Reformed dogmaticians maintain that the oblation and the intercession must be co-extensive in latitude and scope. The New Testament directly joins Christ's death with His intercession as the guarantee against condemnation for the elect in Romans 8:33–34 and Hebrews 7:25.

=== Biblical passages ===
Reformed theologians divide the biblical data regarding the extent of the atonement into passages that explicitly limit the intent and efficacy of Christ's death to a defined group, and passages containing universal language ("all", "world") which they interpret according to grammatical, historical, and covenantal contexts.

==== Passages describing a particular intent ====
Defenders of particular redemption argue that Scripture repeatedly qualifies the targets of Christ's sacrifice in restrictive, covenantal terms:

- "His People" and "His Sheep": Christ was named Jesus because He would "save his people from their sins" (Matthew 1:21). In John 10:11–15, Jesus identifies Himself as the "good shepherd" who "lays down his life for the sheep," while telling those who reject Him, "you do not believe because you are not among my sheep" (John 10:26).
- "The Church": In Acts 20:28 and Ephesians 5:25–27, the purchase of the cross is explicitly predicated of the church: Christ "loved the church and gave himself up for her, that he might sanctify her."
- The High-Priestly Prayer: In John 17:9, Jesus limits the scope of His priestly intercession: "I am not praying for the world but for those whom you have given me, for they are yours." Reformed commentators argue that Christ's priestly offering (oblation) and priestly intercession are co-extensive.
- The Trans-National Scope ("The Many"): Passages such as Matthew 20:28, Hebrews 9:28, and Revelation 5:9 speak of Christ giving His life as a "ransom for many" and ransoming people for God "from every tribe and language and people and nation," which Reformed theologians interpret as denoting an elect multitude drawn from all nations rather than every single individual without exception.

==== Exegesis of universal passages ====
Reformed exegetes address passages containing universal terms ("all", "world") through several hermeneutical principles:

- "All without distinction" vs. "All without exception": In passages such as 1 Timothy 2:1–6 and Titus 2:11, the term "all men" is interpreted as referring to all categories, classes, and ethnicities of people (kings, rulers, rich, poor, Gentiles, and Jews) rather than every individual human being, consistent with the context of public prayer for various societal ranks (1 Timothy 2:1–2).
- The Scope of Kosmos (World): In Johannine texts such as John 3:16 and 1 John 2:2, Reformed scholars argue that "the world" (κόσμος) denotes fallen human society in general, or Gentiles alongside Jews, refuting Jewish exclusivism by demonstrating that salvation extends to all nations, rather than teaching an equal, individual atonement for the non-elect.
- Targeted Audience in 2 Peter: In 2 Peter 3:9 ("not wishing that any should perish, but that all should reach repentance"), the pronouns "any" and "all" are exegeted in light of the verse's specific address to "you-ward" (εἰς ὑμᾶς) and the greeting in 2 Peter 1:1 to believers ("those who have obtained a faith of equal standing with ours"), indicating God's patience toward the elect until all are brought to repentance.
- Covenantal Language in 2 Peter 2:1: Regarding false teachers "denying the Master who bought them," Reformed expositors understand "bought" as either an allusion to Old Testament covenantal redemption (such as God buying the national body of Israel out of Egypt in Deuteronomy 32:6) or as a phenomenological description reflecting the false teachers' own external profession within the visible church.

=== Confessional positions ===
The doctrine of definite atonement is codified across the major historic confessions of the Reformed and Presbyterian traditions. The Canons of Dort (1619), formulated to refute the Remonstrant Articles, structure the doctrine under the Second Main Point of Doctrine: Infinite Sufficiency (Article 3), and Definite Efficacy (Article 8). The Belgic Confession (1561) similarly affirms in Article 20 that God demonstrated His justice and mercy by delivering His Son to suffer for the sins of His people.

The Westminster Confession of Faith (1646) affirms the inseparable unity between the purchase and application of redemption. The 1689 Baptist Confession of Faith adopts the exact wording of the Westminster Confession in Chapter 8, Paragraph 8, cementing the doctrine of particular redemption within the confessional Particular Baptist tradition.

== Objections and theological responses ==
Critics of limited atonement argue that the doctrine contradicts biblical affirmations of God's universal love, undermines the sincerity of the gospel offer, and misconstrues the nature of Christian conversion. In response, Reformed theologians maintain that definite atonement is the only position that preserves the actual efficacy of the cross and the unity of the Trinity's redemptive purpose.

=== Sincerity of the universal gospel offer ===
- Objection: Non-Calvinist theologians argue that if Christ died only for the elect, the universal proclamation of the gospel (the general call or vocatio externa) becomes insincere, as salvation would be offered to individuals for whom no propitiatory sacrifice was ever made.
- Reformed response: Reformed dogmaticians (such as Herman Bavinck and Louis Berkhof) respond that the gospel offer does not proclaim "Christ died for you specifically as an individual," but rather "whoever repents and believes will be saved". Because Christ's death is of infinite intrinsic value and sufficient for all (as affirmed in the Canons of Dort, II.3), the offer is genuine: no sinner who comes to Christ will be turned away for lack of sufficiency in the atonement.

=== Moral culpability and duty-faith ===
- Objection: Critics argue that it is unjust for God to condemn unregenerate sinners for failing to believe in a Savior who did not intend to redeem them, asserting that moral responsibility requires that salvation was objectively provided on their behalf.
- Reformed response: Reformed theologians maintain that sinners are condemned on the basis of their personal violations of God's moral law and their natural, willful enmity toward God, not merely for rejecting the atonement. The duty to believe the gospel is a moral obligation to accept God's true testimony concerning His Son, and human inability to believe arises from moral corruption rather than any extrinsic defect in the gospel.

=== Universal scope of biblical language ===
- Objection: Opponents cite explicit passages describing Christ's sacrifice in universal terms, such as being the propitiation for the "whole world", a ransom for "all" , and God "not wishing that any should perish".
- Reformed response: Reformed commentators point out that scriptural terms like "all" and "world" (kosmos) rarely mean every individual without exception in their immediate context. In Johannine and Pauline usage, "world" and "all" frequently mean "all kinds of people" (without ethnic distinction, including Gentiles as well as Jews) or designate the broader realm of fallen creation, while the patience described in 2 Peter 3:9 is contextualized by its address to believers ("you-ward").

=== Conditional application vs. Double jeopardy ===
- Objection: Non-Calvinist defenders of penal substitution (such as William Lane Craig) argue that the Reformed "double payment" or "double jeopardy" objection rests on an invalid application of human legal systems to divine grace. They contend that Christ paid the penalty for all sins conditionally, but the legal remittance of that penalty is applied only when the sinner exercises faith.
- Reformed response: Reformed authors counter that if Christ paid for all the sins of those who ultimately perish, and yet they are condemned for the sin of unbelief, then either unbelief is not a sin for which Christ died, or God exacts punishment twice for the same offense. Furthermore, Reformed theology asserts that saving faith itself is not an unpurchased, autonomous human contribution, but a covenantal gift merited and purchased by Christ's sacrifice on the cross.
