= Jean-Frédéric Osterwald =

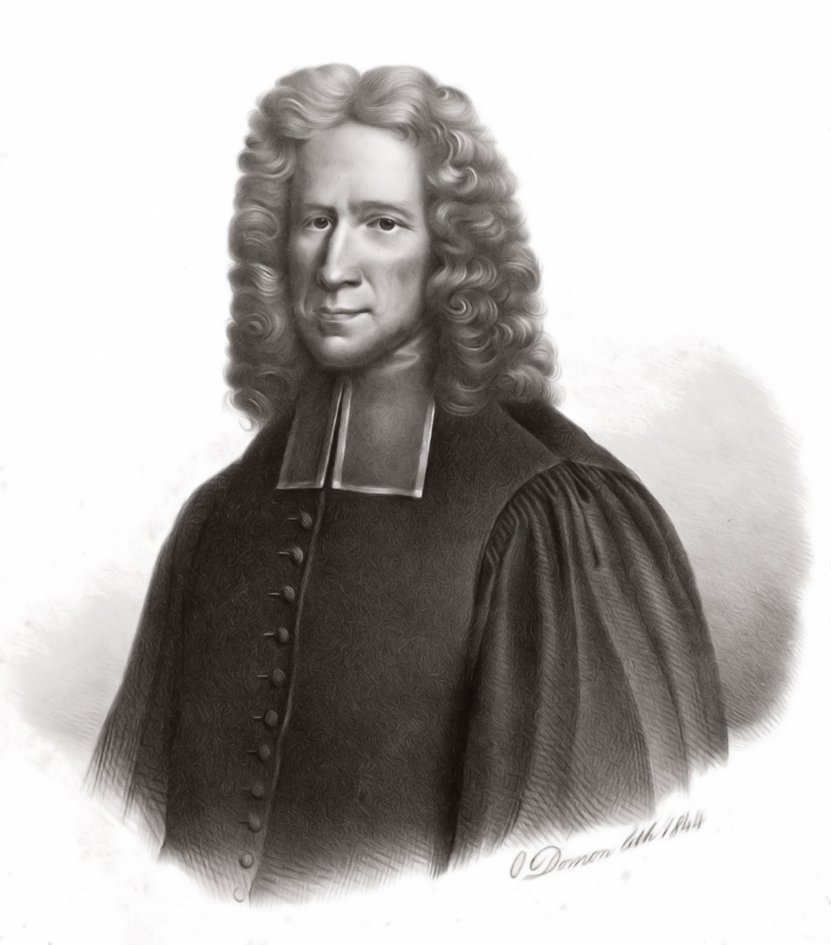
Ostervald

Jean-Frédéric Osterwald (or Ostervald) (25 November 1663 – 14 April 1747) was a Protestant pastor from Neuchâtel (now in Switzerland).

== Life ==
He was born into a patrician family on 25 November 1663 in Neuchâtel, in the Principality of Neuchâtel, the son of the Reformed pastor Johann Rudolf Ostervald. He was educated at Zürich and at Saumur (where he graduated), studied theology at Orléans under Claude Pajon, at Paris under Jean Claude and at Geneva under Louis Tronchin (de), and was ordained to the ministry in his native place in 1683.

He spent most of his life at Neuchâtel, first as a deacon, then from 1699 a pastor, and finally he was elected deacon. Besides this he gave lectures at the academy of theology. As preacher, pastor, lecturer and author, he attained a position of great influence in his day, he and his friends, J. A. Turretini of Geneva and S. Werenfels (1657-1740) of Basel, forming what was once called the Swiss triumvirate.

In matters of theology, Ostervald thought to show a leaning towards Socinianism and embraced Arminianism, emphasizing the freewill of the man.

His innovative proposals embraced dogmatics, exegesis (his important adaptation of a translation of, and commentary on the Bible), liturgy (Bible reading instead of preaching), hymnology and moral theology (importance of good deeds and moral life). His writings had a great influence, bearing spiritual renewal among Waldensian, Dutch, German, Hungarian and Scandinavian Protestants. Moreover, the English Royal Society for the Propagation of the Gospel in Foreign Parts – of which he was a member – brought his teachings to the countries of the Middle East, India, Canada and the West-Indian Islands. His highly influential oeuvre was later called "the second Reformation".

In August 1746 he had a stroke in the pulpit. He died in Neuchâtel on 14 April 1747 after 61 years of service. His pastor's office was inherited by his son Jean Rodolphe (1687-1764).

== Works ==
Ostervald's major works are:

- Traité des sources de la corruption qui regne aujourd'huy parmi les chrétiens (1700), translated into English, Dutch and German, Hungarian practically a plea for a more ethical and less doctrinal type of Christianity;
- Catéchisme ou instruction dans la religion chrétienne (1702), also translated into English, Dutch and German;
- Traité contre l'impureté (1707);
- Sermons sur divers textes (1722-1724);
- Theologiae compendium (1739); and
- Traduction de la Bible (1724).

All his writings were popular among French Protestants; many were translated into various languages; Ostervald's Bible, a revision of the French translation, in particular, was well known in Great Britain.

== Notes and references ==
=== Sources ===
- Chisholm, Hugh, ed. (1911). "Ostervald, Jean Frédéric" . Encyclopædia Britannica. Vol. 20 (11th ed.). Cambridge University Press. p. 358.
- Neeser, Maurice (1948). Jean-Frédéric Ostervald 1663-1747 (PDF) (in French). Neuchâtel: A la Baconnière. p. 358.
