= Philippe Mestrezat =

Genevan Calvinist minister and professor

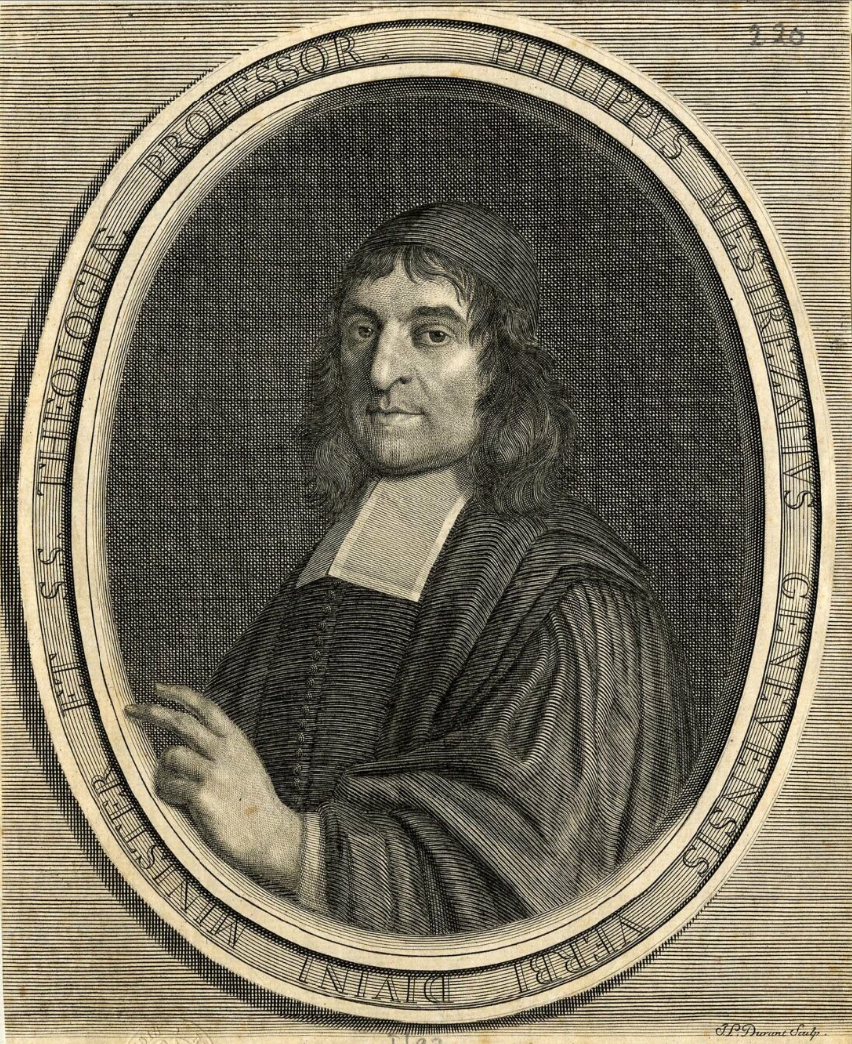
Engraving by Jean-Louis Durant, c. 1675

Philippe Mestrezat (Geneva, 14 October 1618 – Geneva, 1 February 1690) was a Genevan Calvinist minister and professor at the Academy of Geneva.

== Life ==
He studied theology at the Geneva Academy, and became a pastor in 1644. He was nephew of Jean Mestrezat, pastor at Charenton.

He was chosen as successor at Geneva to Alexander Morus; but in doctrinal terms shared the sympathy of Morus for the doctrines of the Saumur Academy. His views were Amyraldist, and led him into conflict with the Company of Pastors. In the debates leading up to the imposition of the Helvetic Consensus he tried to moderate the formulation applied in Geneva, but the other cantons objected and threatened to boycott the Academy.

== Notes ==
Academic offices
Preceded by Théodore Tronchin; Alexander Morus; Antoine Léger	Chair of theology at the Academy of Geneva; 1649–1690; With: Théodore Tronchin (1649-1656); Antoine Léger (1649-1654); François Turrettini (1653-1687); Louis Tronchin (de) (1661-1690); Benedict Pictet (1686-1690)	Succeeded by Louis Tronchin (de); Benedict Pictet; Bénédict Calandrini (de) (fr)
