= Special salvation =

Special salvation may refer to:

- 1 Timothy 4:10, a verse of the New Testament which mentions "God, the Savior of all, especially of believers"
- Christian conditionalism, view that immortality is a gift conditionally conferred by God
- Christian mortalism, the view that the soul is not naturally immortal
- Limited atonement, view that Christ died for the sins of the elect alone
