= Late orthodoxy =

Late orthodoxy may refer to:

- Reformed orthodoxy#Late orthodoxy (1700–1790), involving the rise of Cocceianism, historical theology, biblical criticism, and natural theology
- Lutheran orthodoxy#Late orthodoxy: 1685–1730, involving rationalism and pietism
