= Samuel Werenfels =

Swiss theologian

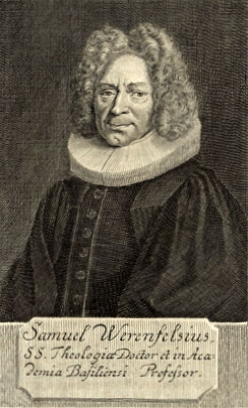
Samuel Werenfels.

Samuel Werenfels (German pronunciation: [ˈzaːmueːl ˈveːʁənfɛls]; 1 March 1657 – 1 June 1740) was a Swiss theologian. He was a major figure in the move towards a "reasonable orthodoxy" in Swiss Reformed theology.

== Life ==
Werenfels was born at Basel in the Old Swiss Confederacy, the son of archdeacon Peter Werenfels and Margaretha Grynaeus. After finishing his theological and philosophical studies at Basel, he visited the universities at Zürich, Bern, Lausanne, and Geneva. On his return he took on the duties, for a short time, of the professorship of logic, for Samuel Burckhardt. In 1685 he became professor of Greek at Basel.

In 1686 Werenfels undertook an extensive journey through Germany, Belgium, and the Netherlands, one of his companions being Gilbert Burnet. In 1687 he was appointed professor of rhetoric, and in 1696 became a member of the theological faculty, occupying successively, according to the Basel custom, the chairs of dogmatics and polemics, Old Testament, and New Testament.

Werenfels received a call from the University of Franeker, but rejected it. In 1722 he led a successful move to have the Helvetic Consensus set aside in Basel, as divisive. He was member of the Prussian Academy of Sciences and the Society for the Propagation of the Gospel of London.

During the last twenty years of his life he lived in retirement. He took part in the proceedings against Johann Jakob Wettstein for heresy, but expressed regret afterwards at having become involved. He died in Basel.

== Views of the "triumvirate" ==
Werenfels represented a theology that put doctrinal quibbles in the background. His epigram on the misuse of the Bible is well known as: "This is the book in which each both seeks and finds his own dogmas." In the Latin original it is

Hic liber est in quo sua quærit dogmata quisque,
Invenit et pariter dogmata quisque sua.

He advocated instead the historical-grammatical method.

With Jean-Alphonse Turrettini and Jean-Frédéric Osterwald, Werenfels made up what has been called a "Helvetic triumvirate", or "Swiss triumvirate", of moderate but orthodox Swiss Calvinist theologians. Their approach began to converge with the Dutch Remonstrants, and the English latitudinarians. Their views promoted simple practical beliefs, rationality and tolerance. They were later charged with being a "Remonstrant trio", and Jan Jacob Schultens defended them. The three in fact admired the "reasonable orthodoxy" of the Church of England, and Turrettini in particular opposed with success the Helvetic Consensus; but Werenfels made the first effective move against it. The triumvirate corresponded with William Wake, amongst other Protestant churchmen.

== Works ==
=== Logomachy ===
Adriaan Heereboord had argued in Cartesian style, against scholasticism for limitations to be put on disputation, which should be bounded by good faith in the participants. Werenfels went further, regarding "logomachy" as a malaise of the Republic of Letters. The "triumvirate" position on ecumenism was based on the use of fundamental articles through the forum of the Republic of Letters.

The underlying causes of logomachy were taken by Werenfels to be prejudice and other failings of the disputants, and ambiguity in language. In his dissertation De logomachiis eruditorum (Amsterdam, 1688) Werenfels argued that controversies that divide Christians are often verbal disputes, arising from moral deficiencies, especially from pride. He proposed to do away with them by making a universal lexicon of all terms and concepts.

In the Oratio de vero et falso theologorum zelo he admonished those who fight professedly for purity of doctrine, but in reality for their own system. He considers it the duty of the polemicist not to combat antiquated heresies and to warm up dead issues, but to overthrow the prevalent enemies of true Christian living.

=== Theology ===
In 1699 he published anonymously Judicium de argumento Cartesii pro existentia Dei. It was an acceptance in particular of the proof of existence of God from the third Meditation of Descartes; and in general of Cartesian philosophical premises.

His conception of his duties as a theological professor was shown in his address, De scopo doctoris in academia sacras litteras docentis. He believed that it was more important to care for the piety of candidates for the ministry, than for their scholarship. It was his belief that a professor of practical theology is as necessary as a professor of practical medicine.

He stood for the necessity of a special revelation of God, and defended the Biblical miracles as confirmations of the words of the evangelists. In his Cogitationes generales de ratione uniendi ecclesias protestantes, quae vulgo Lutheranarum et Reformatorum nominibus distingui solent, he sought a way of reconciling Lutherans and Calvinists.

The De jure in conscientias ab homine non usurpando dated from 1702; it was written after Nicolaus Wil(c)kens had defended a thesis on religious freedom in the absence of consequences for public order, and defends freedom of conscience. The work met the approval of Benjamin Hoadly and Samuel Haliday, while being used by Daniel Gerdes to attack Johannes Stinstra.

=== Collections ===
His Dissertationum theologicarum sylloge appeared first Basel, 1709; a further collection of his works is Opuscula theologica, philologica, et philosophica (Basel, 1718, new ed., 3 vols., 1782).

=== Sermons, dissertations, translations ===
From 1710 Werenfels (a native speaker of German) was asked to preach sermons in the French church at Basel; they were in a plain style. As a preacher he has been described as "estranged from false pathos, elegant, intelligible, and edifying". These sermons were published as Sermons sur des verités importantes de la religion auxquels on ajoute des Considerations sur la reünion des protestans (1715). They were translated into German, and into Dutch by Marten Schagen. Schagen also translated the De recto theologi zelo into Dutch.

The De logomachiis eruditorum was translated into English as Discourse of Logomachys, or Controversys about Words (1711). Thomas Herne under a pseudonym translated Latin and French works as Three Discourses (1718), at the time of the Bangorian Controversy. William Duncombe translated An Oration on the Usefulness of Dramatic Interludes in the Education of Youth (1744).
