= Théodore Tronchin (theologian) =

Genevan theologian (1582–1657)

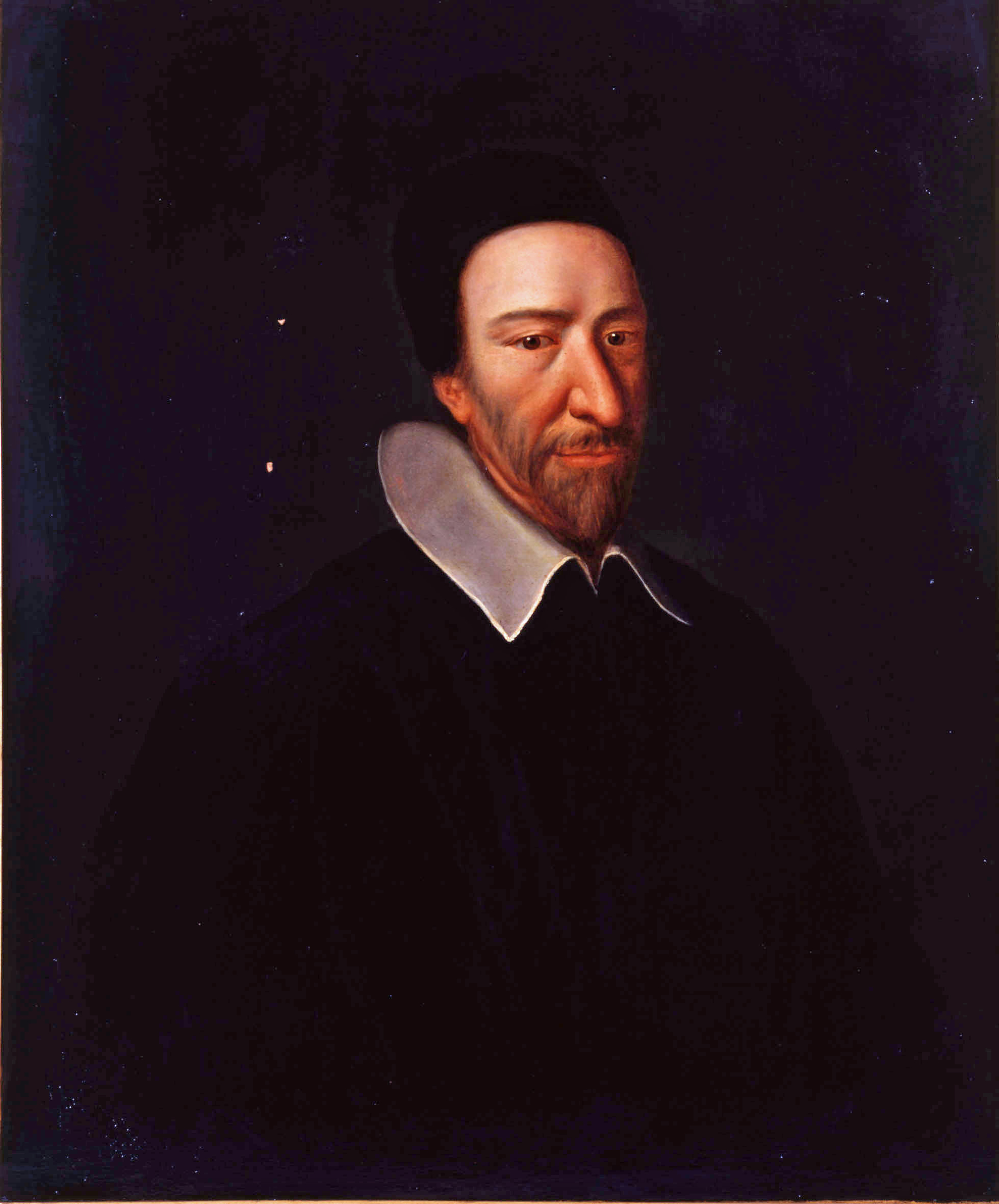

Théodore Tronchin (Latin: Tronchinus) (17 April 1582 – 19 November 1657) was a Genevan Calvinist theologian, controversialist and Hebraist.

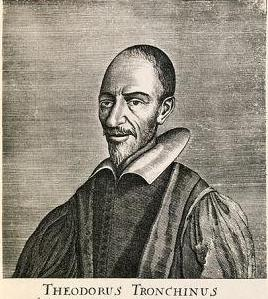
Théodore Tronchin, 1657 engraving.

== Life ==
He was born at Geneva, on 17 April 1582, the son of Rémi Tronchin and Sara Morin. He married Théodora Rocca, the adopted daughter of Théodore de Bèze. He studied theology at Geneva, Basel, Heidelberg, Franeker, and Leiden. He became professor of oriental languages at the academy of Geneva in 1606; he was preacher there in 1608, and professor of theology in 1618. He was rector in 1610.

In 1618, he was sent with his colleague Giovanni Diodati to the Synod of Dort, as Genevan delegate, where he spoke in favour of the perseverance of the saints. In 1632, he was army chaplain under Henri, Duke of Rohan, during his final campaign in Valtellina. In 1655, he was one of the delegation that conferred in Geneva with John Dury.

He died in Geneva on 19 November 1657. The theologian Louis Tronchin was his son. His daughter Renée married the printer Pierre Chouet, and the theologian Jean-Robert Chouet was their son.

== Views ==
He was an orthodox Calvinist, opposed to Amyraldism.

== Works ==
He was asked to reply to the Jesuit Pierre Coton, who in Genève plagiaire (1618) had attacked the Genevan Bible translation, the Bible de Genève. Benédict Turrettini answered quickly in 1618, to the early parts of the book; and Coton published a rebuttal. Tronchin's answer Coton plagiaire (also Cotton) appeared at the beginning of 1620.

Other works were:

- De bonis operibus (1628);
- Oratio funebria de Henrico duce Rohani (1638);
- De peccato originali (1658).

His 1628 funeral oration for Simon Goulart is known for the hint in it that Goulart knew the author of the Vindiciae contra tyrannos.

Academic offices
Preceded by Giovanni Diodati; Bénédict Turrettini	Chair of theology at the Genevan Academy; 1615–1656; With: Giovanni Diodati (1615-1631); Bénédict Turrettini (1615-1645); Friedrich Spanheim (1631-1642); Alexander Morus (1642-1649); Antoine Léger (1645-1654); Philippe Mestrezat (1649-1656); François Turrettini (1653-1656)	Succeeded by Philippe Mestrezat; François Turrettini
