= Georges Polier de Bottens =

Swiss theologian (1675–1759)

- Born: 15 December 1675; Lausanne
- Died: 28 October 1759 (aged 83); Lausanne
- Occupations: Theologian, professor
- Spouse: Anne Daillez (m. 1704) Suzanne Brun de Castellane-de Caille (m. 1711)
- Parent(s): Jean-Pierre Polier de Bottens (father); Jeanne Loys (mother)

Georges Polier de Bottens (15 December 1675 – 28 October 1759) was a Swiss Protestant theologian and professor at the Academy of Lausanne.

== Biography ==
Polier de Bottens was born in Lausanne on 15 December 1675, the son of Jean-Pierre Polier de Bottens, lieutenant-colonel of the Vaud militia, and Jeanne Loys. In 1704 he married Anne Daillez, a Huguenot refugee, and in 1711 he married Suzanne Brun de Castellane-de Caille, also a Huguenot refugee.

He studied at the Academy of Lausanne from 1689 to 1695, obtaining a doctorate in moral philosophy, and then at the Academy of Geneva from 1695 to 1696, where he studied theology. He was ordained in 1700 and served as subdeacon in Lausanne from 1701 to 1702.

At the Academy of Lausanne, he was professor of Greek and moral philosophy (1702–1703), then professor of Hebrew and catechesis from 1703 until his death in 1759. He served as rector on three occasions: 1708–1711, 1724–1727, and 1742–1743.

In 1726 he founded the city's school of charity. In 1722 he was compelled to sign the Formula Consensus.

== Bibliography ==
- Livre du Recteur, 5, 212.
- Professeurs Académie Lausanne, 470–471.
