= Giovanni Diodati =

Calvinist theologian (1576–1649)

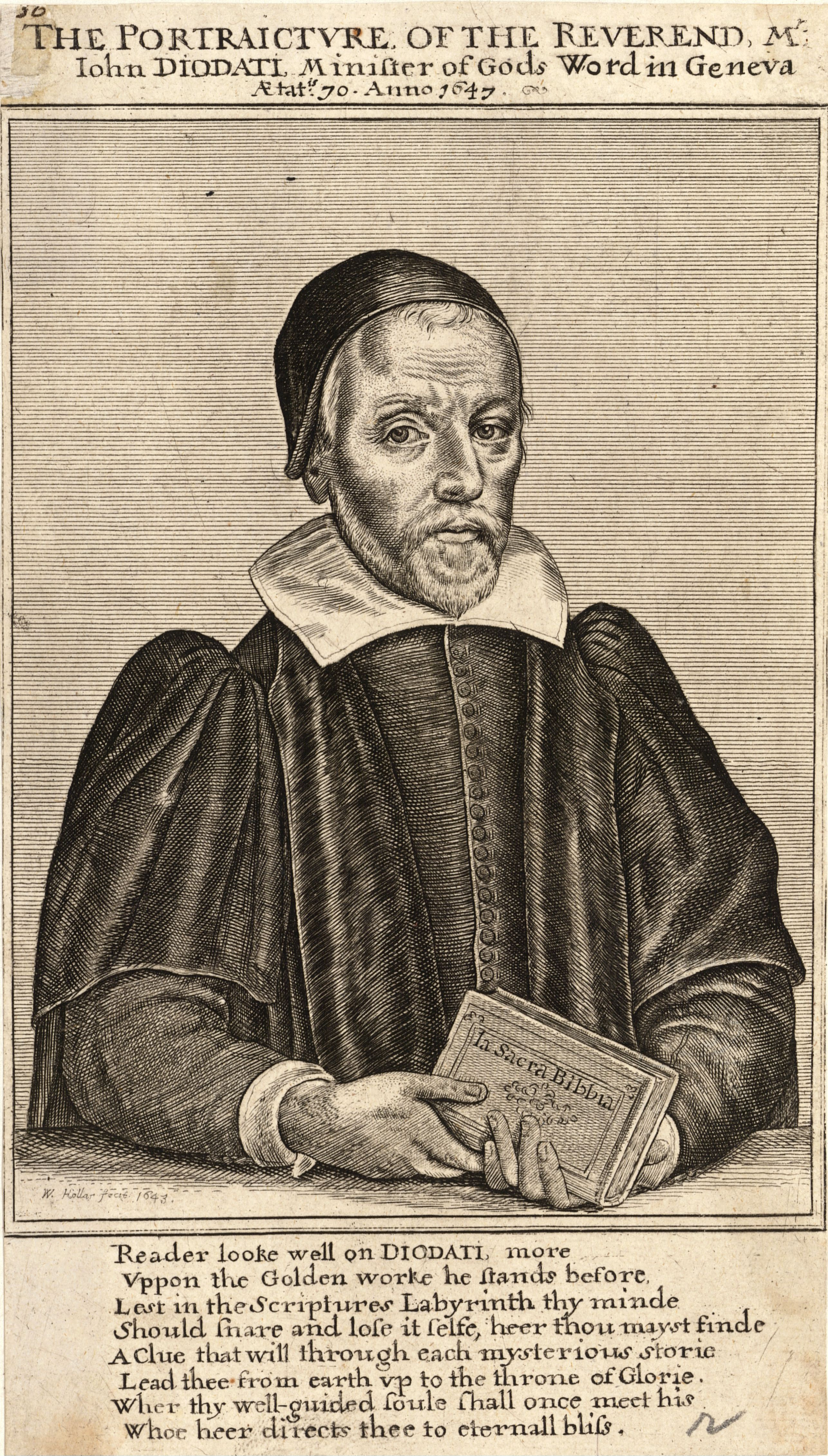
A 1647 engraving of Diodati by Wenceslas Hollar

Giovanni Diodati or Deodati (3 June 1576 – 3 October 1649) was a Genevan-born Italian Calvinist theologian and translator. His translation of the Bible into Italian from Hebrew, Greek, Latin, and Syriac sources became the reference version used by Italian Protestants.

== Biography ==
He was born on 3 June 1576, at Geneva, to a noble family originally from Lucca in Italy, and was exiled on account of its Protestantism. He considered himself an Italian "di nation lucchese", of Lucchese nationality. His father was Carlo Diodati. The Diodatis were part of a group of about sixty noble Luchessi families who had emigrated to Geneva, sometimes called the "Italian Cabal". Between 1594 and 1597, future Amsterdam burgomaster Jacob Dircksz de Graeff lived for three years in the house of Diodati. He matriculated at the Genevan Academy in 1596. At the age of twenty-one he was nominated professor of Hebrew at Geneva on the recommendation of Theodore Beza. In 1606, he became professor of theology, in 1608 pastor, or parish minister, at Geneva, and in the following year he succeeded Beza as professor of theology.

As a preacher Diodati was eloquent, and he was sent on a mission to France in 1614. He had previously visited Italy, and made the acquaintance of Paolo Sarpi, whom he endeavoured unsuccessfully to engage in a reformation movement. In 1618 and 1619, he attended the Synod of Dort, and took a prominent part, being one of the six divines appointed to draw up the Canons of Dort. He sympathized with the condemnation of the Arminians.

In 1645, Diodati resigned his professorship, and he died at Geneva on 3 October 1649.

== Works ==
Diodati is chiefly famous as the author of the translation of the Bible into Italian (1603; edited with notes, 1607; revised and with metrical psalter, 1641). He also undertook a translation of the Bible into French, which appeared with notes in 1644. Among his other works are his Annotationes in Biblia (1607), of which an English translation (Pious and Learned Annotations upon the Holy Bible) was published in London in 1643 (2nd edition 1648) and various polemical treatises, such as De fictitio Pontificiorum Purgatorio (1619); De justa secessione Reformatorum ab Ecclesia Romana (1628); De Antichristo, etc. He also published French translations of Paolo Sarpi's History of the Council of Trent, and of Edwin Sandys's Account of the State of Religion in the West.

Academic offices
Preceded by Theodore Beza	Chair of theology at the Genevan Academy; 1599–1645; With: Gaspard Alexius (1610-1612); Bénédict Turrettini (1612-1631); Théodore Tronchin (1615-1645); Friedrich Spanheim (1631-1642); Alexander Morus (1642-1645)	Succeeded by Théodore Tronchin; Alexander Morus; Antoine Léger
