= Protestant scholasticism =

Protestant scholasticism or Protestant orthodoxy was academic theology practiced by Protestant theologians using the scholastic method during the era of Calvinist and Lutheran orthodoxy from the 16th to 18th centuries. Protestant scholasticism developed out of the need to clearly define and defend church doctrine against the Catholic Church and other Protestant churches. It refers to both Lutheran scholasticism and Reformed scholasticism. Anglicanism never developed a scholastic theology; however, Anglican writers in the 1600s studied early Christian writings to prove that Anglicanism had faithfully followed the teachings and practices of the early Church.

Protestant scholasticism "became the dominant organizational approach to teaching theology in the academies" before its influence began to wane in the 17th and 18th centuries.

Martin Luther was highly critical of Aristotelianism in medieval theology, but was mainly influenced by William of Ockham.
