= Benedict Pictet =

Genevan theologian

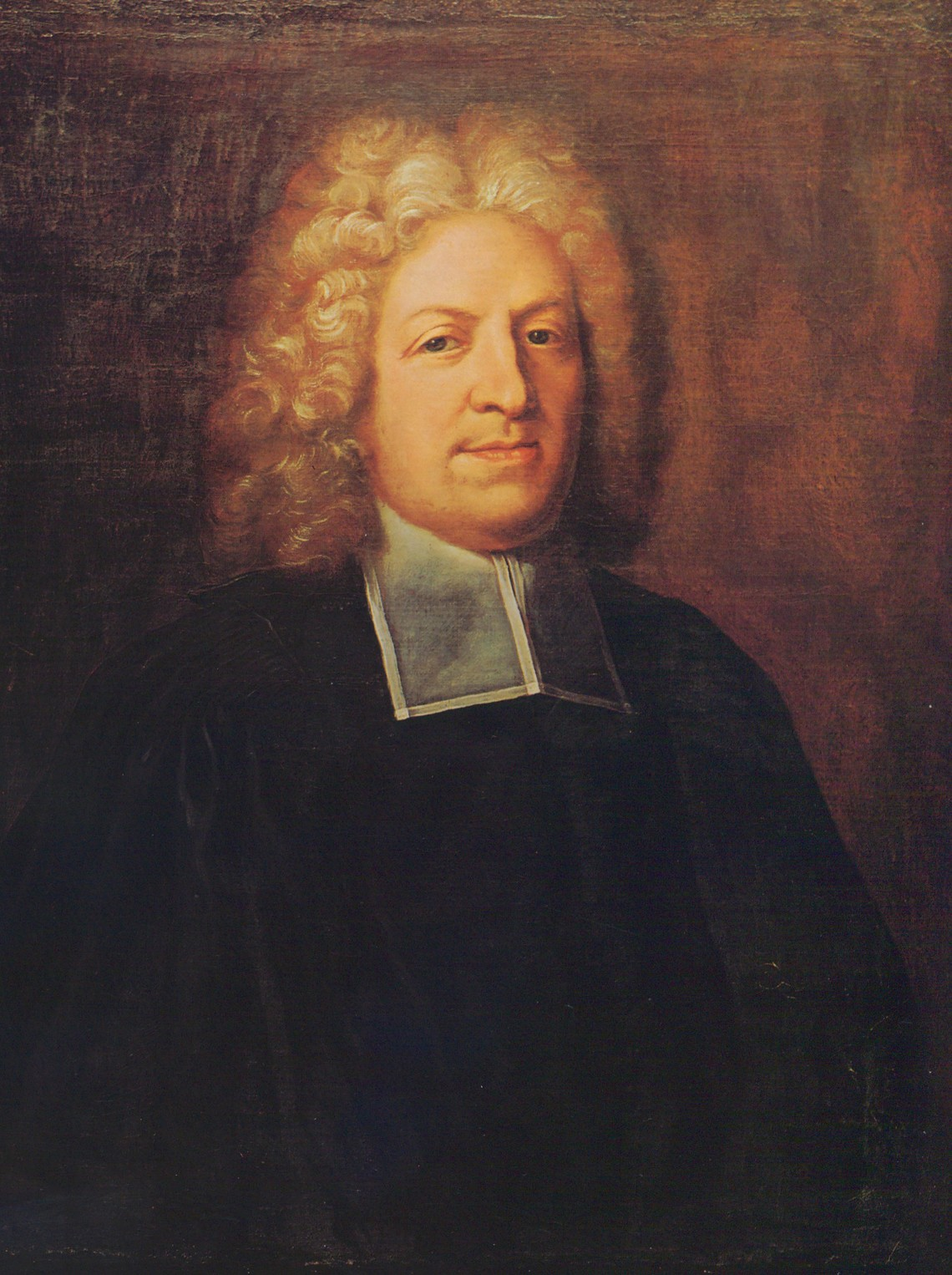
Benedict Pictet by Robert Gardelle (January 10, 1720)

Benedict Pictet (1655–1724) was a Genevan Reformed theologian.

== Life ==
He was born at Geneva on 19 May 1655. After receiving a university education there, he made an extensive tour of Europe. He then assumed pastoral duties at Geneva, and in 1686 was appointed professor of theology. He died there on 10 January 1724, at the age of 68. Pictet was a nephew of Francis Turretin, who called him to "his bedside when dying, not his son," and Pictet preached his uncle's funeral sermon.

== Works ==
In the area of systematic theology, Pictet published two major works:

- Theologia Christiana (3 vols., Geneva, 1696; Eng. transl., Christian Theology, London, 1834, by Frederick Reyroux); and
- Morale chrétienne (2 vols., 1692).

He sought to revive the old orthodox theology, but was unable to prevent the Genevan Company of Pastors from adopting a new formula of subscription in 1706.

Pictet was also known as Christian poet, some of his hymns being included in French hymnals. Other works were Huit sermons sur L'examen des religions (3d ed., Geneva, 1716; Eng. transl., True and False Religion examined; the Christian Religion defended; and the Protestant Reformation vindicated, Edinburgh, 1797, by Archibald Bruce) and Dialogue entre un catholique et un protestant (1713; Eng. transl., Romanist Conversations, London, 1826 by Henry Huntingford).

== Notes ==
Academic offices
Preceded by Philippe Mestrezat; François Turrettini; Louis Tronchin (de)	Chair of theology at the Genevan Academy; 1686–1724; With: Philippe Mestrezat (1686-1690); François Turrettini (1686-1687); Louis Tronchin (de) (1686-1705); Bénédict Calandrini (de) (fr) (1690-1720); Jean-Alphonse Turrettini (1705-1724); Antoine Léger (II) (1713-1719); Samuel Turrettini (1719-1724)	Succeeded by Jean-Alphonse Turrettini; Antoine Léger; Samuel Turrettini; Antoine Maurice, I (fr)
