= Bénédict Turrettini =

Genevan theologian

- Benedetto Turrettini
- Born: 9 September 1588; Lucca
- Died: 4 March 1631 (aged 42)
- Education: University of Geneva
- Title: Professor of Theology

Bénédict Turrettini (9 November 1588 – 4 March 1631), the son of Francesco Turrettini, a native of Lucca, who settled in Geneva in 1579, was born at Zürich on 9 November 1588. He was ordained a pastor in Geneva in 1612, and became professor of theology in 1618. He became a citizen of the Republic of Geneva in 1627.

In 1620 he represented the Genevan Church at the national synod of Alais, when the decrees of the synod of Dort were introduced into France; and in 1621 he was sent on a successful mission to the states-general of the Netherlands, and to the authorities of the Hanseatic towns, with reference to the defence of Geneva against the threatened attacks of the duke of Savoy. He published in 1618–1620 (2 vols.) a defence of the Genevan translation of the Bible, Eine Verteidigung der genser Bibelübersetzung (Défense de la fidélité des traductions de la Bible faites à Genève), against Pierre Cotton's Genève plagiaire. He died on 4 March 1631.

His son was François Turrettini.

Academic offices
| Preceded by Giovanni Diodati | Chair of theology at the Genevan Academy; 1612–1631; With: Giovanni Diodati (1612-1631); Théodore Tronchin (1615-1631) | Succeeded by Giovanni Diodati; Théodore Tronchin; Friedrich Spanheim |
