= Henry Huntingford =

Henry Huntingford (1787–1867) was an English clergyman and miscellaneous writer.

== Life ==
Born at Warminster, Wiltshire on 19 September 1787, he was the son of the Rev. Thomas Huntingford, master of Warminster school, and a nephew of George Isaac Huntingford He became a scholar of Winchester College in 1802, and matriculated at New College, Oxford, on 16 April 1807, subsequently becoming a Fellow both of New College and (5 April 1814) and of Winchester. He took the degree of B.C.L. on 1 June 1814.

In 1822 he was appointed rector of Hampton Bishop, Herefordshire, and in 1838 a prebendary in Hereford Cathedral. He was also rural dean. He died at Goodrest, Great Malvern, on 2 November 1867.

== Works ==
Huntingford published:

- Pindari Carmina juxta exemplar Heynianum ... et Lexicon Pindaricum ex integro Dammii opere etymologico excerptum, an edition of Pindar, 1814; another edition, 1821. His edition of Christian Tobias Damm's Lexicon Pindaricum was also issued separately in 1814.
- Romanist Conversations; or Dialogues between a Romanist and a Protestant. Published at Geneva in 1713, and translated from the original French of Benedict Pictet, 1826.

He also edited his uncle's Thoughts on the Trinity, 1832.
