= Daniel Gerdes =

German Calvinist theologian and historian

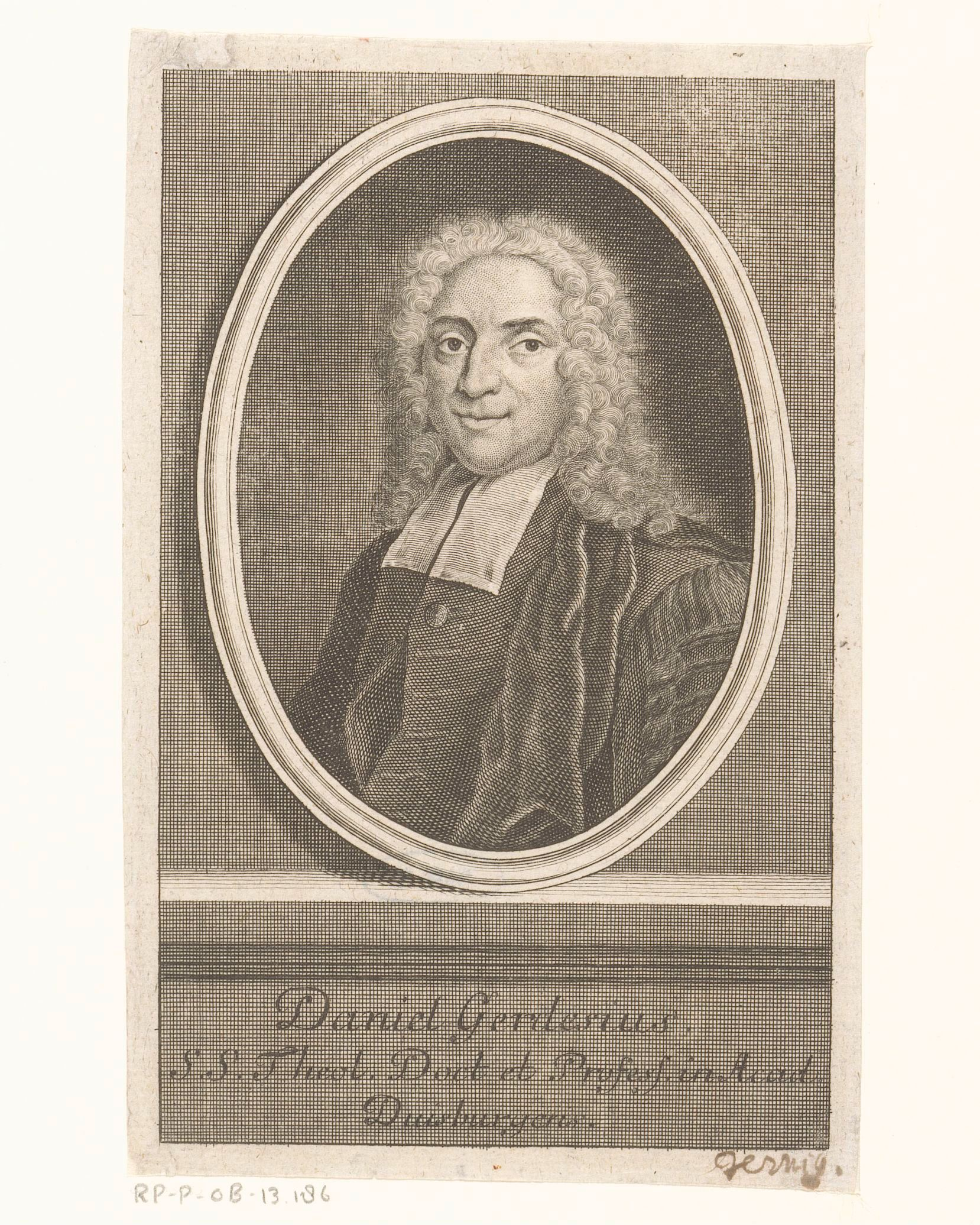
Daniel Gerdes, engraving by Johann Martin Bernigeroth.

Daniel Gerdes (Latin: Gerdesius) (19 April 1698, Bremen – 11 February 1765) was a German Calvinist theologian and historian. He became professor at the University of Duisburg in 1726, and at the University of Groningen in 1736.

While broadly supporting Protestant freedom of conscience, Gerdes drew a line in his attacks on the Mennonite minister Johannes Stinstra. In that case Gerdes used the views of Samuel Werenfels, tolerant and well thought of by Benjamin Hoadley, to condemn Stinstra.

== Works ==
- Historia Reformatis (4 vols., 1744–52)
- Scrinium Antiquarium (4 vols., 1749–65)
- Specimen Italiae Reformatae (1765)
