= Alan Clifford =

Alan Clifford is a pastor in the Norwich Reformed Church. He is an outspoken proponent of Amyraldism, or four-point Calvinism.

Clifford was born in 1941 and grew up in Farnborough, Hampshire. Out of Anglicanism, he embraced Puritanism through the direct influence of Dr Martyn Lloyd-Jones in 1963. After a career in mechanical and electrical engineering at the Royal Aircraft Establishment, Farnborough, he pursued a BA in philosophy at University of Wales, Bangor, 1966-69; followed by MLitt in philosophy of religion in 1978; PhD in historical theology in 1983. With his ordination to the congregational ministry in 1969, Dr Clifford has pursued pastoral ministry in Northampton, Gateshead, Gt Ellingham, Norfolk and Norwich.

His doctoral thesis was published by Oxford University Press in 1990. He has written several influential books on theologies of Reformation, Calvinism, Calvinistic Methodism and Evangelical Protestantism such as:

- Atonement and Justification: English Evangelical Theology 1640–1790: An Evaluation.
- Calvinus: Authentic Calvinism, A Clarification.
- The Good Doctor: Philip Doddridge of Northampton. (A Tercentenary Tribute).

In 2012 he was stopped from holding a weekly bookstall in Norwich following a complaint it was producing "hate-motivated" literature against Islam. In 2013 he was investigated by the police after describing the Norwich Pride celebrations as an “unashamed carnival of perverted carnality”.
