= Helvetic Consensus =

The Helvetic Consensus (Latin: Formula consensus ecclesiarum Helveticarum) is a Swiss Reformed profession of faith drawn up in 1675 to guard against doctrines taught at the French Academy of Saumur, especially Amyraldism. It was the last doctrinal Confession of the Reformed Church of Switzerland.

== Origin ==
The definition of the doctrines of election and reprobation by the Synod of Dort (1618–1619) occasioned a reaction in France, where the Protestants lived surrounded by Roman Catholics. Moise Amyraut, professor at Saumur, taught that the atonement of Jesus was hypothetically universal rather than particular and definite. His colleague, Louis Cappel, denied the verbal inspiration of the Hebrew text of the Old Testament, and Josué de la Place rejected the immediate imputation of Adam's sin as arbitrary and unjust.

The famous and flourishing school of Saumur came to be looked upon with increasing mistrust as the seat of heterodoxy, especially by the Swiss, who were in the habit of sending students there. The first impulse to attack the new doctrine came from Geneva, seat of historical Calvinism. In 1635 Friedrich Spanheim wrote against Amyraut, whom the clergy of Paris tried to defend. In course of time Amyraldism gained ground in Geneva. In 1649, Alexander Morus, the successor of Spanheim, but suspected of belonging to the liberal party, was compelled by the magistrates of Geneva to subscribe to a series of articles in the form of theses and antitheses, the first germ of the Formula consensus. His place was taken by Philippe Mestrezat, and later by Louis Tronchin (de), both inclined toward the liberal tendency of France, while Francis Turretin defended the traditional system. Mestrezat induced the Council of Geneva to take a moderate stand point in the article on election, but the other cantons of Switzerland objected to this new tendency and threatened to stop sending their pupils to Geneva.

The Council of Geneva submitted and peremptorily demanded from all candidates subscription to the older articles. But the conservative elements were not satisfied, and the idea occurred to them to stop the further spread of such novelties by establishing a formula obligatory upon all teachers and preachers. After considerable discussion between Lucas Gernler of Basel, Hummel of Bern, Ott of Schaffhausen, Johann Heinrich Heidegger of Zürich, and others, the last mentioned was charged with drawing up the formula. In the beginning of 1675, Heidegger's Latin draft was communicated to the ministers of Zurich; and in the course of the year it received very general adoption, and almost everywhere was added as an appendix and exposition to the Helvetic Confession.

== Content ==
The Consensus consists of a preface and twenty-five canons, and states clearly the difference between strict Calvinism and the school of Saumur.

- Canons i–iii treat of divine inspiration, and the preservation of the Scriptures. It affirms that the Hebrew vowel points are inspired.
- Canons iv–vi relate to election and predestination.
- Canons vii–ix attempt to show that man was originally created holy, and that obedience to law would have led him to eternal life.
- Canons x–xii reject La Place's doctrine of a mediate imputation of the sin of Adam.
- Canons xiii–xvi treat of the particular destination of Christ as he from eternity was elected head, master, and heir of those that are saved through him, so in time he became mediator for those who are granted to him as his own by eternal election.
- Canons xvii–xx state that the call to election has referred at different times to smaller and larger circles
- Canons xxi–xxiii define the total incapacity of man to believe in the Gospel by his own powers as natural, not only moral, so that he could believe if he only tried.
- Canons xxiii–xxv state that there are only two ways of justification before God and consequently a twofold covenant of God, namely the covenant of the works for man in the state of innocence, and the covenant through the obedience of Christ for fallen man. The final canon admonishes to cling firmly to the pure and simple doctrine and avoid vain talk.

== Later history ==
Although the Helvetic Consensus was introduced everywhere in the Reformed Church of Switzerland, it did not long hold its position. At first, circumspection and tolerance were shown at the enforcement of its signature, but as soon as many French preachers sought positions in Vaud after the revocation of the edict of Nantes, it was ordered that all who intended to preach must sign the Consensus without reservation. An address of the Great Elector of Brandenburg to the Reformed cantons, in which, in consideration of the dangerous position of Protestantism and the need of a union of all Evangelicals, he asked for a nullification of the separating formula, brought it about that the signature was not demanded in Basel after 1686, and it was also dropped in Schaffhausen and later (1706) in Geneva, while Zurich and Bern retained it.

Meanwhile, the whole tendency of the time had changed. Secular science stepped into the foreground. The practical, ethical side of Christianity began to gain a dominating influence. Rationalism and Pietism undermined the foundations of the old orthodoxy. An agreement between the liberal and conservative parties was temporarily attained insofar that it was decided that the Consensus was not to be regarded as a rule of faith, but only as a norm of teaching. In 1722 Prussia and England applied to the respective magistracies of the Swiss cantons for the abolition of the formula for the sake of the unity and peace of the Protestant Churches. The reply was somewhat evasive, but, though the formula was never formally abolished, it gradually fell entirely into disuse.
