= Claude Pajon =

17th-century French theologian

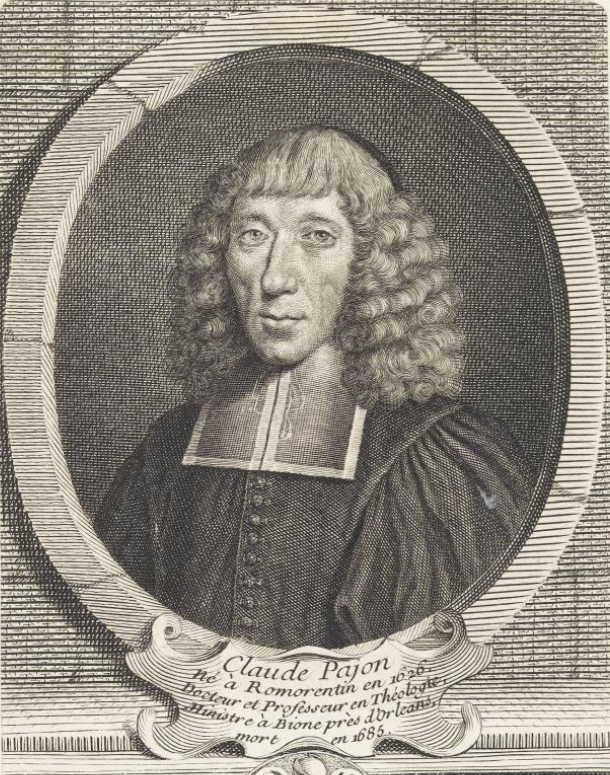
Claude Pajon

Claude Pajon (1626, Romorantin-Lanthenay – September 27, 1685) was a 17th-century French theologian. He followed the teachings of John Cameron which was at odds with the dominant Calvinist views which led to the "Pajonist controversy" in 1668.

After studying at Blois under Paul Testard, he was declared for the ministry on 25 August 1650. He was soon appointed to be pastor at Marchenoir.

He studied at the University of Saumur, where in 1666 he was hired as a professor of theology. Two years later, however, in 1668, Pajon was forced to resign from the position following the so-called "Pajonist controversy" surrounding his views on salvation. Pajon had disseminated a manuscript expounding his radical view that the Holy Spirit operates on human intellect and reason through the Word of God, a view which was seen as contrary to the University's prevailing Calvinist doctrine. Following his resignation, Pajon became a pastor at Orléans. In 1677, his unorthodox views led to accusations that he was an Arminianist and a Pelagianist. He died on September 27, 1685, in Carré, near Orléans.
