= Francis Turretin =

Genevan-Italian Reformed scholastic theologian (1623–1687)

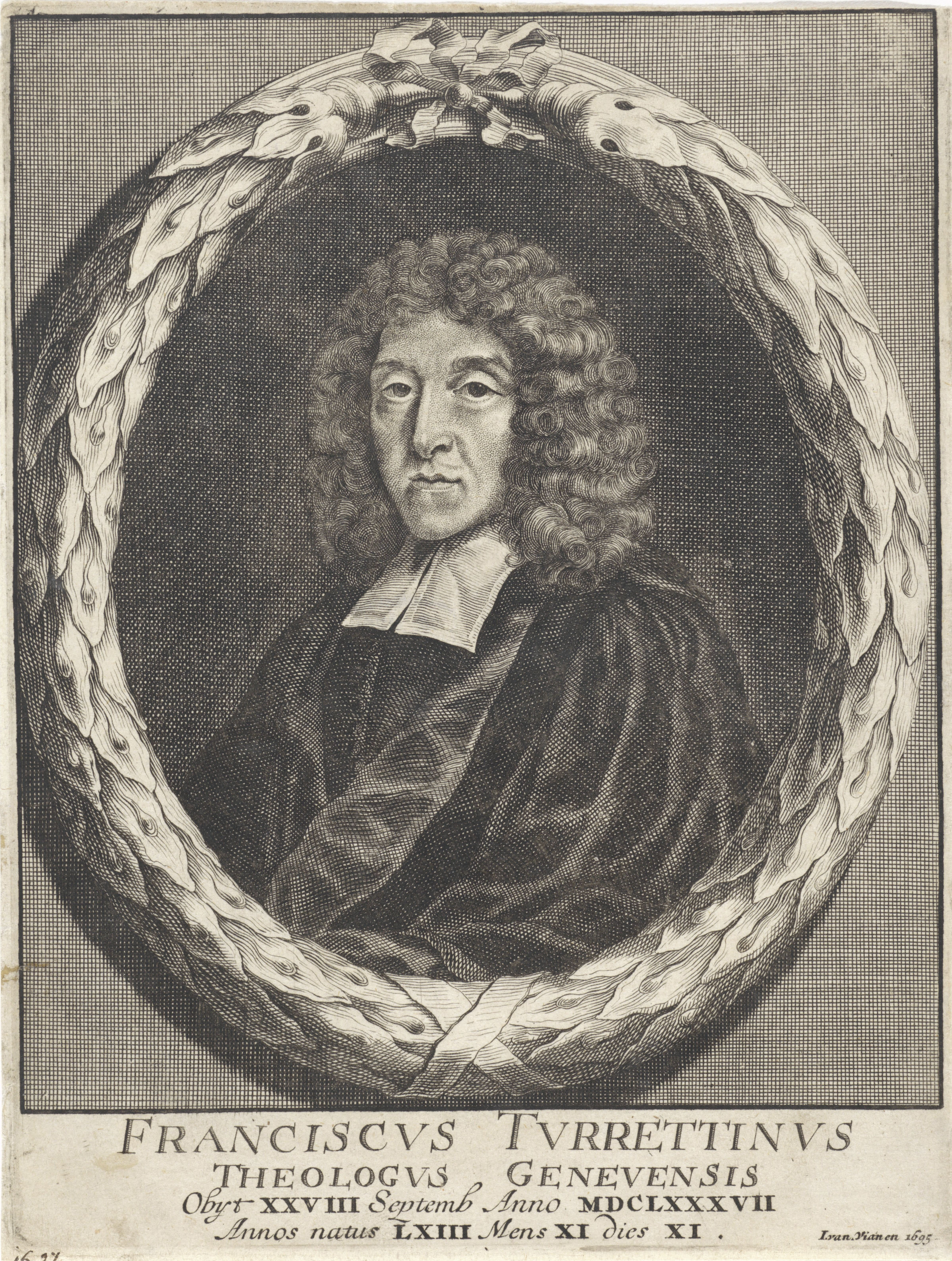
- Born: François Turrettini; 17 October 1623; Geneva, Republic of Geneva
- Died: 28 September 1687 (aged 63); Geneva, Republic of Geneva
- Occupation: Theologian

Francis Turretin (also known as François Turrettini; 17 October 1623 – 28 September 1687) was a Genevan-Italian Reformed scholastic theologian.

Turretin is especially known as a zealous opponent of the moderate Calvinist theology of the Academy of Saumur (embodied by Moise Amyraut and called Amyraldianism). He was an earnest defender of the Calvinistic orthodoxy represented by the Synod of Dort, and as one of the authors of the Helvetic Consensus, which defended the formulation of predestination from the Synod of Dort and the verbal inspiration of the Bible.

== Life ==
Francis was the son of Bénédict Turrettini, and like his father, was born in Geneva. Their ancestor (Bénédict's father), Francesco Turrettini, had left his native Lucca in 1574 and settled in Geneva in 1592.

Francis studied theology at Geneva (1640–1644), Leiden (1644), Utrecht, Paris (1645–1646), Saumur (1646–1648), Montauban, and Nîmes. In Paris he also studied philosophy under Roman Catholic Pierre Gassendi. Returning to his native city of Geneva, he was made pastor of the Italian church there from 1648 to 1687, of the French congregation from 1653 to 1687, and professor of theology at the University of Geneva in 1653. He is the father of Jean-Alphonse Turrettini, who would do much to dismantle the theology his father promoted.

== Works ==
His Institutio Theologiae Elencticae (3 parts, Geneva, 1679–1685) is an example of Reformed scholasticism. The Institutes uses the scholastic method to dispute a number of controversial issues. In it he defended the view that the Bible is God's verbally inspired word. He also argued for infralapsarianism and federal theology. The Institutes was widely used as a textbook, up to its use at Princeton Theological Seminary by the Princeton theologians only to be replaced by Charles Hodge's Systematic Theology in the late 19th century. Of his other disputations, his most important are De Satisfactione Christi disputationes (1666) and De necessaria secessione nostra ab Ecclesia Romana et impossibili cum ea syncretismo (published in 1687). He wrote the Helvetic Consensus, a Reformed confession written against Amyraldianism, with J. H. Heidegger in 1675.

Turretin greatly influenced the Puritans, but until recently, he was a mostly forgotten Protestant scholastic from the annals of church history, though the English translation of his Institutes of Elenctic Theology is increasingly read by students of theology. John Gerstner called Turrettini "the most precise theologian in the Calvinistic tradition."

== Free Choice ==
Along the lines of Reformed theology, Turretin argues that after the fall human beings did not lose the faculty of will itself. "The inability to do good is strongly asserted, but the essence of freedom is not destroyed" (Institutio theologiae elencticae, 10.2.9). They still have liberty which is not repugnant to certain kinds of necessity. For Turretin, neither the entities of the will nor the intellect are either the sole faculty of free will, which is rather conceived of their plurality as a mixed faculty. "As it belongs to the intellect with regard to the decision of choice, so it belongs to the will with regard to freedom" (Institutio theologiae elencticae, 10.1.4). Turretin distinguishes six kinds of necessity (Institutio, 10.2.4–9): physical necessity, necessity of coercion, necessity of dependence on God, rational necessity, moral necessity, and necessity of event. The first two among these six necessities are incompatible with freedom, whereas the latter four are not only compatible with freedom but perfect it. For example, treating upon the compatibility of moral necessity, Turretin asserts, despite the fact that a will can be rendered "slavish" if determined by habit to a manner of action, that "this servitude by no means overthrows the true and essential nature of liberty" (Institutio theologiae elencticae, 10.2.8). For Turretin, freedom does not arise from an indifference of the will. No rational beings are indifferent to good and evil. The will of an individual human being is never indifferent in the sense of possessing an equilibrium, either before or after the fall. Turretin defines freedom with the notion of rational spontaneity (Institutio, 10.2.10–11).

Turretin's doctrine of freedom appears to be similar to that of Scotus in that both of them endorse Aristotelian logic: the distinction between the necessity of the consequent (necessitas consequentis) and the necessity of the consequence (necessitas consequentiae); the distinction between in sensu composito and in sensu diviso. It is not Scotus's notion of synchronic contingency but Aristotle's modal logic which is incorporated into Turretin's doctrine of freedom. Moreover, the Scotistic ideas about necessity and indifference differ greatly from those of Turretin. Turretin develops the discussion on necessity and relates it to his argument about human freedom of choice. His careful rejection of the notion of indifference in the doctrine of freedom creates a big gap between his doctrine and that of Scotus. Turretin's teaching of contingency emphasizes the sovereign act of God in the process of conversion, whereas Scotus's contingency theory blurs it. Turretin is not a Scotist, but a Reformed theologian standing in a more "generic Aristotelian tradition."

== English translations ==
- Institutes of Elenctic Theology. Translated by George Musgrave Giger, edited by James T. Dennison Jr.; 3 volumes (1992–1997). ISBN 0-87552-451-6
- Justification an excerpt from Turretin's Institutes (2004). ISBN 0-87552-705-1
- The Atonement of Christ. Translated by James R. Willson (1978). ISBN 0-8010-8842-9

== Bibliography ==
- This article includes content derived from the public domain 'Schaff-Herzog Encyclopedia of Religious Knowledge, 1914.
- Spencer, Stephen R. (2000). "TURRETIN, FRANČOIS". In Carey, Patrick W.; Lienhard, Joseph T. (eds.). Biographical Dictionary of Christian Theologians. Westport, CT: Greenwood Press. ISBN 1-56563-798-4.

Academic offices
Preceded by Théodore Tronchin; Antoine Léger; Philippe Mestrezat	Chair of theology at the Genevan Academy; 1653–1687; With: Théodore Tronchin (1653–1656); Antoine Léger (1653–1654); Philippe Mestrezat (1653–1687); Louis Tronchin (de) (1661–1687); Benedict Pictet (1686–1687)	Succeeded by Philippe Mestrezat; Louis Tronchin (de); Benedict Pictet
