= Louis Tronchin =

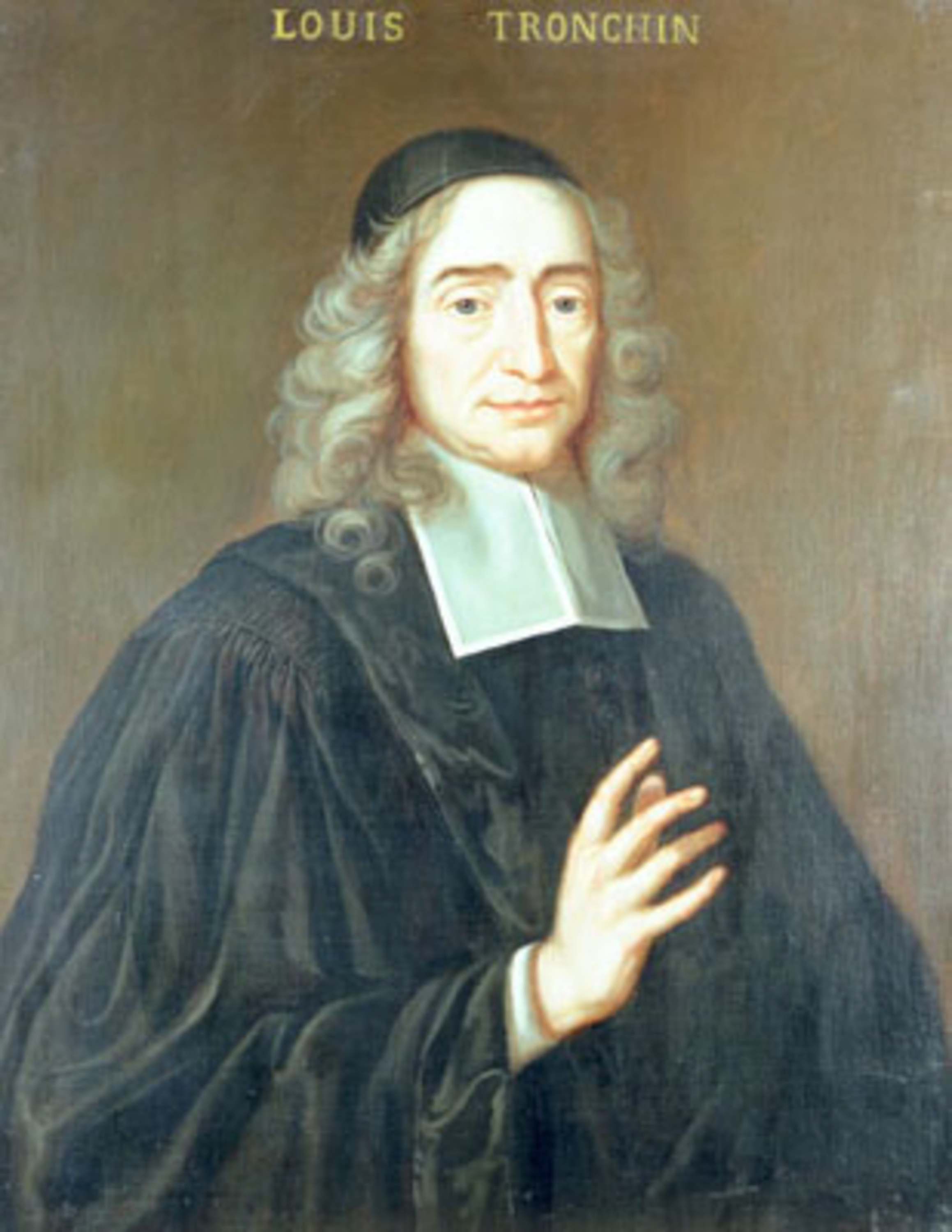

Louis Tronchin (born at Geneva Dec. 4, 1629; died there Sept. 8, 1705) was a Genevan Calvinist theologian and the son of Théodore Tronchin.

== Life ==
He studied at the Protestant Academy of Saumur under Moses Amyraut, whose "hypothetical universalism" had been vehemently contested by Tronchin the elder; he became pastor of the congregation of Lyons in 1656; and professor of theology at the Genevan Academy in 1661, in which position he represented the liberal trend and advocated tolerance. In 1669 he demanded the abolition of the oath that was imposed on all candidates [in theology], not to attempt any innovations in the Calvinist doctrine.

== Works ==
His works were:

- Disputatio de providentia Dei (Geneva, 1670)
- De auctoritate Scripturæ Sacræ (1677)

== Bibliography ==
- Eugene Haag and Émile Haag, La France protestante, vol. ix, P 225.. 2d ed., Paris, 1877 sqq.;
- J. Gaberel. Histoire de l'Église de Geneve, vol. iii., Geneva, 1862
- Charles Borgeaud, L'Academie de Calvin, Geneva, 1900
- Frédéric Auguste Lichtenberger, Encyclopédie des sciences religieuses, xii 234- 236.

Attribution

Academic offices
Preceded by Philippe Mestrezat; François Turrettini	Chair of theology at the Genevan Academy; 1661–1705; With: Philippe Mestrezat (1661-1690); François Turrettini (1661-1687); Benedict Pictet (1686-1705); Bénédict Calandrini (de) (fr) (1690-1705)	Succeeded by Benedict Pictet; Bénédict Calandrini (de) (fr); Jean-Alphonse Turrettini
