= Jean-Alphonse Turrettini =

Genevan theologian (1671–1737)

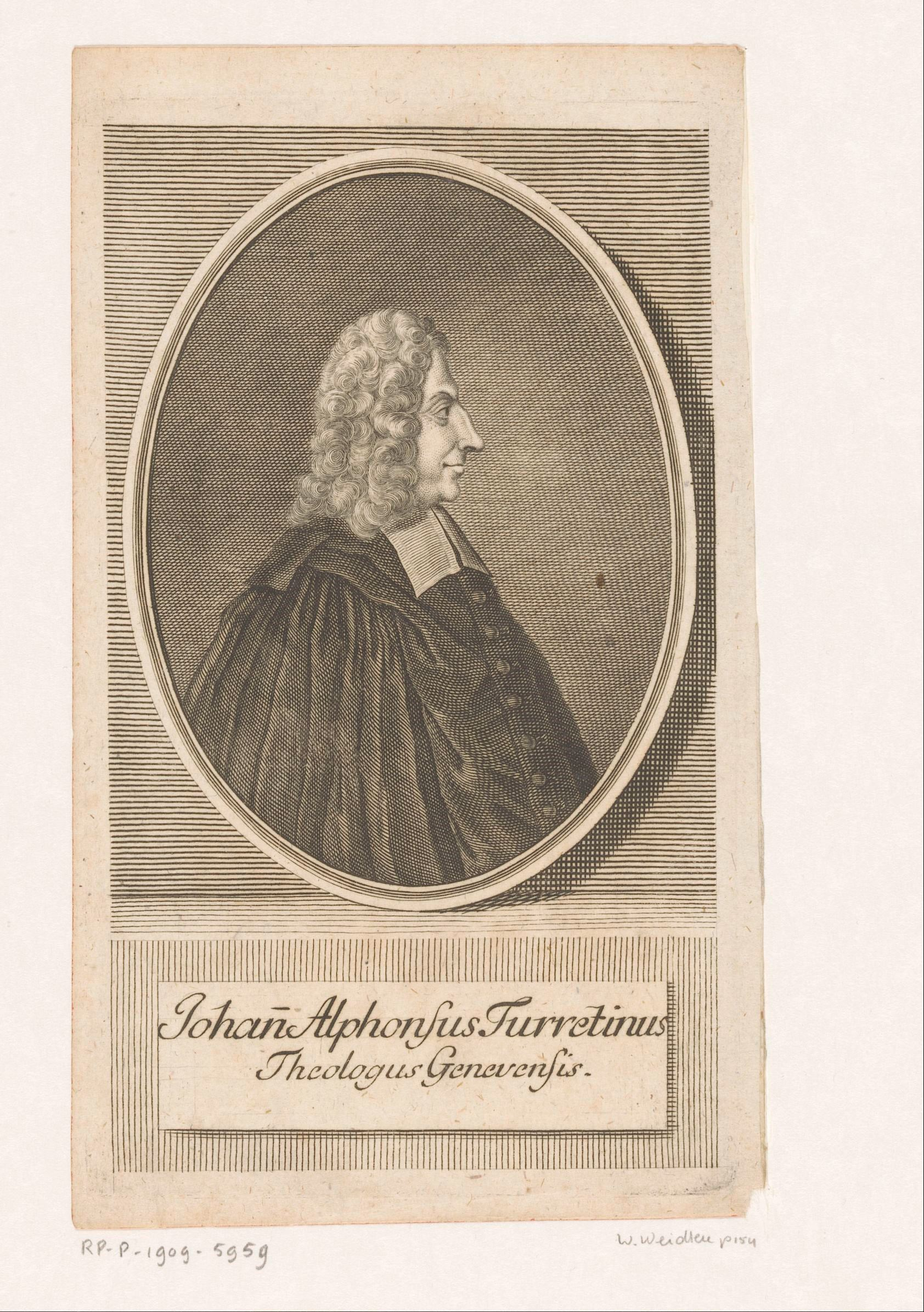
Jean-Alphonse Turrettini.

Jean-Alphonse Turrettini (August 1671 – May 1737) was a theologian from the Republic of Geneva.

The son of François Turrettini, he was born in Geneva. He studied theology at Geneva under Louis Tronchin (de), and after travelling in Holland, England and France was received into the "Vénérable Compagnie des Pasteurs" of Geneva in 1693. Here he became pastor of the Italian congregation, and in 1697 professor of church history, and later (1705) of theology.

During the next forty years of his life he enjoyed great influence in Geneva as the advocate of a more liberal theology than had prevailed under the preceding generation, and he was the leading force behind abolishing the rule obliging ministers to subscribe to the Helvetic Consensus in 1706, and renouncing the Consensus itself in 1725. He also wrote and labored for the promotion of union between the Reformed and Lutheran Churches, his most important work in this connection being Nubes testium pro moderato et pacifico de rebus theologicis judicio, et instituenda inter Protestantes concordia (Geneva, 1729). Besides this he wrote Cogitationes et dissertationes theologicae, on the principles of natural and revealed religion (2 vols., Geneva, 1737; in French, Traité de la vérité de la religion chrétienne) and commentaries on Thessalonians and Romans.

Academic offices
Preceded by Louis Tronchin; Benedict Pictet; Bénédict Calandrini (de) (fr)	Chair of theology at the Genevan Academy; 1705-1737; With: Benedict Pictet (1705-1724); Bénédict Calandrini (de) (fr) (1705-1720); Antoine Léger (II) (1713-1719); Samuel Turrettini (1719-1727); Antoine Maurice, I (fr) (1724-1737); Jacob Bessonnet (1727-1737)	Succeeded by Antoine Maurice, I (fr); Jacob Bessonnet; Louis Tronchin (II)
