= Moses Amyraut =

French Protestant theologian and metaphysician (1596–1664)

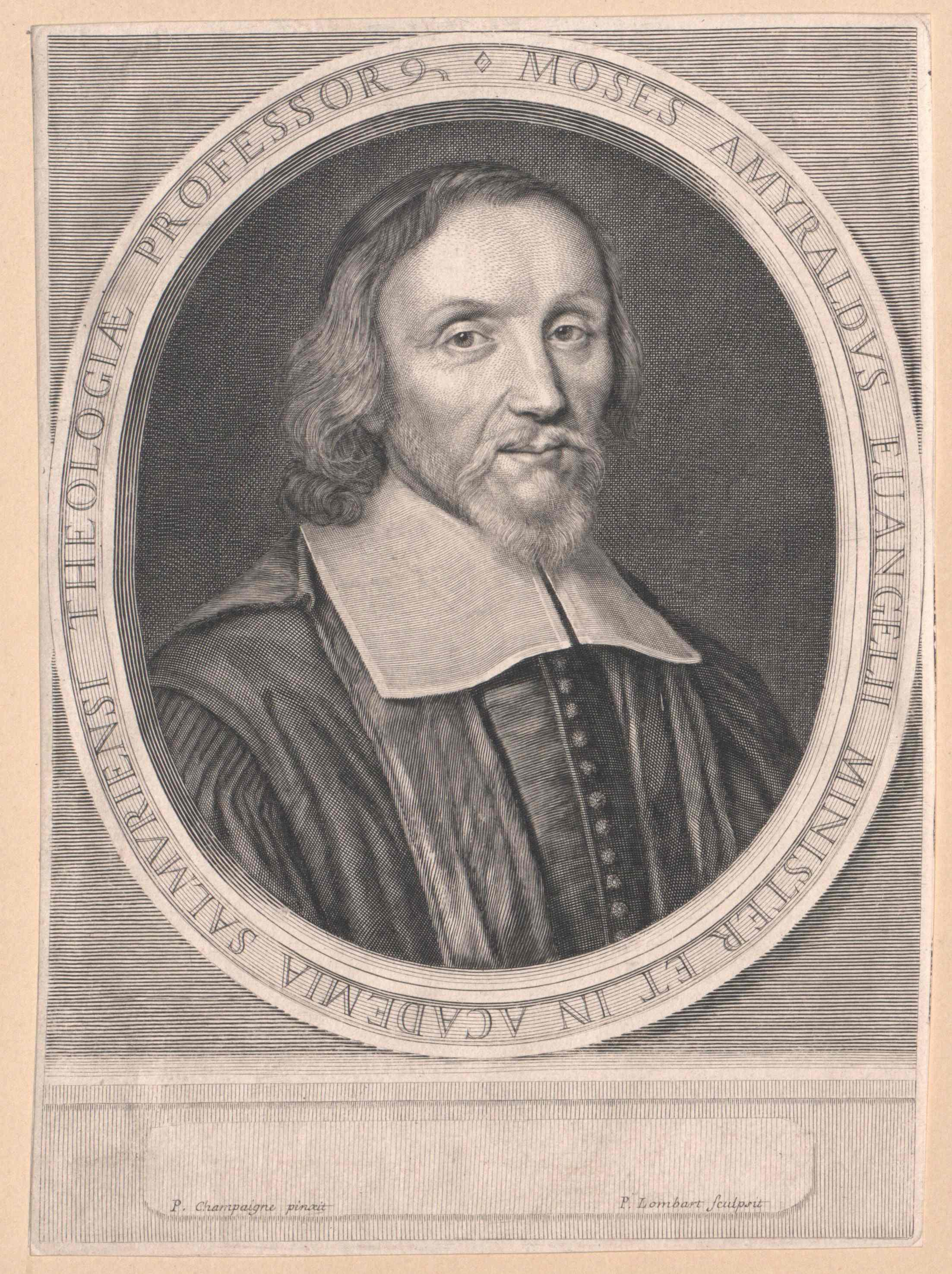
Moïse Amyraut

Moïse Amyraut (Latin: Moyses Amyraldus; September 1596 – 8 January 1664), in English texts often Moses Amyraut, was a French Huguenot, Reformed theologian and metaphysician. He was the architect of Amyraldism, a Calvinist doctrine that made modifications to Calvinist theology regarding the nature of Christ's atonement and covenant theology.

== Life ==
=== Early life ===
Amyraut was born in Bourgueil, in the valley of the Changeon in the province of Anjou. His father was a lawyer, and, preparing Moses for the same profession, sent him, on the completion of his study of the humanities at Orléans, to the university of Poitiers.

At the university he took the degree of licentiate (BA) of laws. On his way home from the university he passed through Saumur, and, having visited the pastor of the Protestant church there, was introduced by him to Philippe de Mornay, governor of the city. Struck with young Amyraut's ability and culture, they both urged him to change from law to theology. His father advised him to revise his philological and philosophical studies, and read over Calvin's Institutions, before finally determining a course. He did so, and decided on theology.

He moved to the Academy of Saumur and studied under John Cameron. Cameron ultimately regarded him as his greatest scholar.

=== Career ===
After his studies, he was licensed as a minister of the French Protestant Church. The contemporary civil wars and excitements hindered his advancement. His first church was in Saint-Aignan, in the province of Maine. There he remained two years. Jean Daillé, who moved to Paris, advised the church at Saumur to secure Amyraut as his successor, praising him "as above himself." The university of Saumur at the same time had fixed its eyes on him as professor of theology. The great churches of Paris and Rouen also contended for him, and to win him sent their deputies to the provincial synod of Anjou.

Amyraut had left the choice to the synod. He was appointed to Saumur in 1633, and to the professor's chair along with the pastorate. On the occasion of his inauguration he maintained for thesis De Sacerdotio Christi. His co-professors were Louis Cappel and Josué de la Place, who also were Cameron's pupils and lifelong friends, who collaborated in the Theses Salmurienses, a collection of theses propounded by candidates in theology prefaced by the inaugural addresses of the three professors. Amyraut soon gave to French Protestantism a new direction.

In 1631 he published his Traité des religions; and from this year onward he was a foremost man in the church. He was chosen to represent the provincial synod of Anjou, Touraine and Maine at the 1631 National Synod of Charenton. During the synod, he was appointed as orator to present to the king The Copy of their Complaints and Grievances for the Infractions and Violations of the Edict of Nantes.

Previous deputies had addressed the king on their bent knees, whereas the representatives of the Catholics had been permitted to stand. Amyraut consented to be orator only if the assembly authorized him to stand. There was intense resistance. Cardinal Richelieu himself, preceded by lesser dignitaries, condescended to visit Amyraut privately, to persuade him to kneel; but Amyraut held resolutely to his point and carried it. His "oration" on this occasion, which was immediately published in the French Mercure, remains a striking landmark in the history of French Protestantism. During his absence on this matter the assembly debated "whether the Lutherans who desired it, might be admitted into communion with the Reformed Churches of France at the Lord's Table." It was decided in the affirmative previous to his return; but he approved with astonishing eloquence, and thereafter was ever in the front rank in maintaining intercommunion between all churches holding the main doctrines of the Reformation.

Pierre Bayle recounts the title-pages of no fewer than thirty-two books of which Amyraut was the author. These show that he took part in all the great controversies on predestination and Arminianism which then so agitated and harassed all Europe. Substantially he held fast the Calvinism of his preceptor Cameron; but, like Richard Baxter in England, by his breadth and charity he exposed himself to all manner of misconstruction. In 1634 he published his Traité de la predestination. In this book, he tried to mitigate the harsh features of predestination by his Universalismus hypotheticus. God, he taught, predestines all men to happiness on condition of their having faith. This gave rise to a charge of heresy, of which he was acquitted at the national synod held at Alençon in 1637, and presided over by Benjamin Basnage (1580–1652). The charge was brought up again at the national synod of Charenton in 1644, when he was again acquitted. A third attack at the synod of Loudun in 1659 met with no better success. The university of Saumur became the university of French Protestantism.

Another historic part filled by Amyraut was in the negotiations originated by Pierre le Gouz de la Berchère (1600–1653), first president of the parlement of Grenoble, when exiled to Saumur, for a reconciliation and reunion of the Catholics of France with the French Protestants. Very large were the concessions made by Richelieu in his personal interviews with Amyraut; but, as with the Worcester House negotiations in England between the Church of England and nonconformists, they inevitably fell through. On all sides the statesmanship and eloquence of Amyraut were conceded.

Amyraut had as many as a hundred students in attendance upon his lectures. One of these was William Penn, who would later go on to found the Province of Pennsylvania in America based in part on Amyraut's notions of religious freedom.

His De l'elevation de la foy et de l'abaissement de la raison en la creance des mysteres de la religion (1641) gave him early a high place as a metaphysician. Exclusive of his controversial writings, he left behind him a very voluminous series of practical evangelical books, which have long remained the "fireside" favourites of the peasantry of French Protestantism. Amongst these are Estat des fideles apres la mort; Sur l'oraison dominicale; Du merite des oeuvres; Traité de la justification; and paraphrases of books of the Old and New Testament.

=== Later years ===
His closing years were weakened by a severe fall he met with in 1657. He died on 18 January 1664 in Saumur.

== Seventeenth century opponents ==
There were a number of theologians who defended Calvinistic orthodoxy against Amyraut and Saumur, including Friedrich Spanheim (1600–1649) and Francis Turretin (1623–1687). Ultimately, the Helvetic Consensus was drafted to counteract the theology of Saumur and Amyraldism.

== Publications ==
His major works include;

- A treatise on religions, confuting those who think that there exists no difference between them, (Saumur, 1631).
- A short treatise on predestination and the principal arguments in its defence, (Saumur, 1634).
- Paraphrases on various books of the New Testament and of the Psalms (12 vols. 8vo, 1644-1662)
- A discourse on the state of believers after death, (Saumur, 1646) (written after the death of his daughter Elizabeth)
- An Apologia in defence of the Reformed Religion, (Saumur, 1647)
- De la Vocation des Pasteurs (Saumur, 1649)
- Christian ethics, 6 vol. (Saumur, 1652-1660)
- In favour of the government of the Church, as opposed to the abolition of synods and their authority, Saumur, 1653)
- The life of François de la Noue, from the beginning of religious troubles in 1560 until his death, (Leyden, 1661)
- In Symbolum Apostol. exercitatio (Saumur, 1663, small 8vo)

== See also ==
- Amyraldism
- Richard Baxter
