= Friedrich Spanheim =

German Calvinist theologian

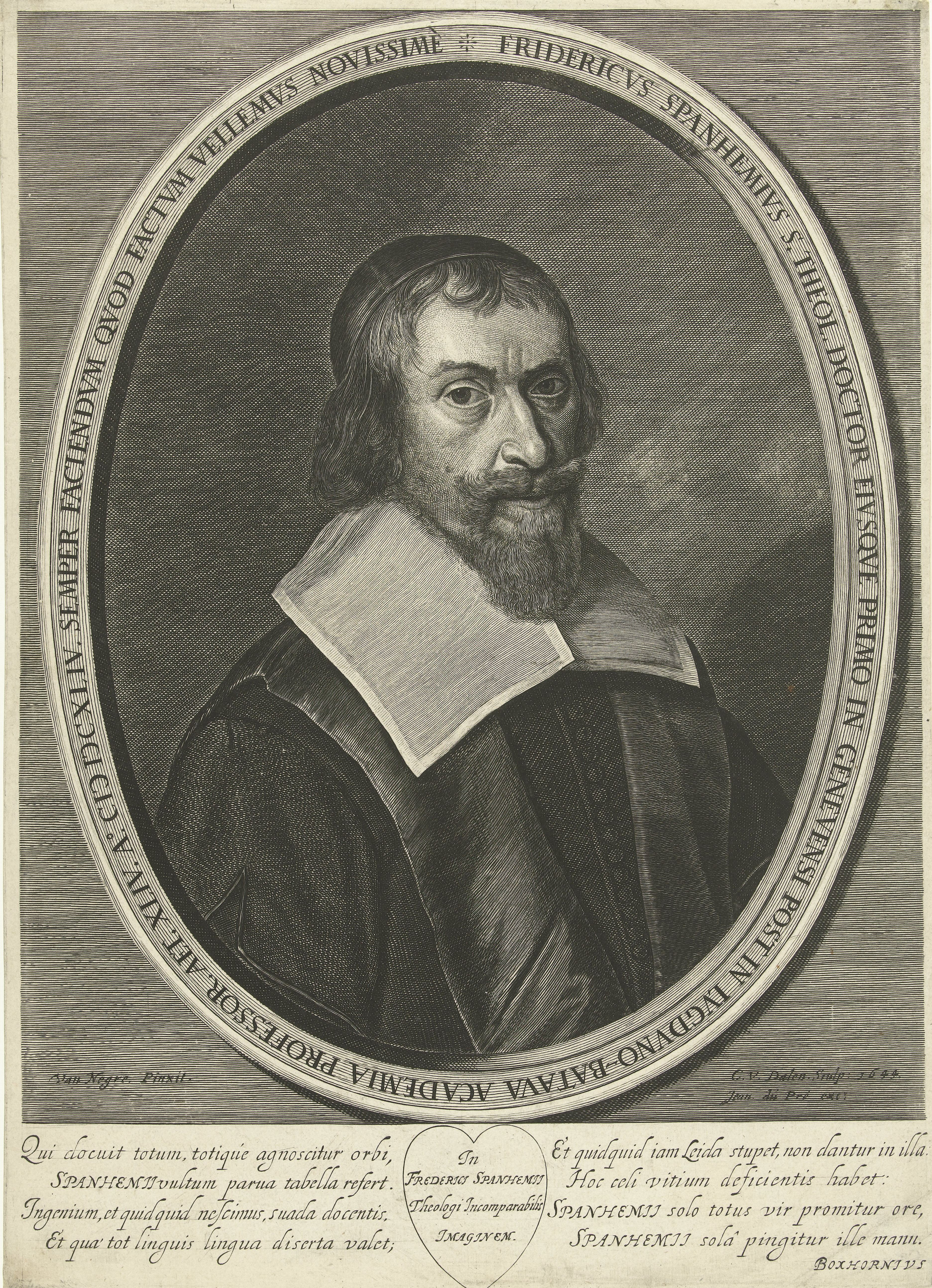
Woodcut of Friedrich Spanheim

Friedrich Spanheim the Elder (January 1, 1600, Amberg – May 14, 1649, Leiden) was a Calvinistic theology professor at the University of Leiden.

== Life ==
He entered in 1614 the University of Heidelberg where he studied philology and philosophy, and in 1619 removed to Geneva to study theology. In 1621 he became tutor in the house of Jean de Bonne, Baron de Vitrolle, governor of Embrun in Dauphiné, and after three years he visited Geneva, and Paris, and England, returning to Geneva in 1626 and becoming professor of philosophy. In 1631 he went over to the theological faculty, and was rector of the academy from 1633 to 1637.

In 1642 he moved to Leiden as professor of theology. There Spanheim became one of the most prominent defenders of the Calvinistic doctrine of predestination against Amyraldism.

== Works ==
He published anonymously, Le Soldat suedois (1633), a history of the Thirty Years' War until 1631 and Le Mercure suisse (1634); Commentaire historique de la vie et de la mort de . . Christofle Vicomte de Dohna (1639).

His principal theological works are:

- Dubia evangelica (3 vols., Geneva, 1631-1639)
- Disputatio de gratia universali (3 vols., Leiden, 1644-1648)
- Epistola ad Buchananum super controversiis...in ecclesiis Anglicanis (Leiden, 1645).

Against the Anabaptists he wrote Variae disputationes anti-Anabaptisticae (1643) and Diatribe historica de origine, progressu, sectis et nominibus anabaptistarum (1645; English translation, Englands Warning by Germanies Woe, London, 1646).

Academic offices
Preceded by Bénédict Turrettini; Giovanni Diodati; Théodore Tronchin	Professor of Theology at the Genevan Academy; 1631–1642; With: Giovanni Diodati; Théodore Tronchin	Succeeded by Giovanni Diodati; Théodore Tronchin; Alexander Morus
