= Academy of Saumur =

Former Huguenot university in France (1593–1685)

- Académie de Saumur
- Other names: University of Saumur
- Active: 1593–after 1685
- Founders: Philippe de Mornay
- Religious affiliation: Protestant
- Location: Saumur, France

The Academy of Saumur (French: Académie de Saumur) was a Huguenot university at Saumur in western France. It existed from 1593, when it was founded by Philippe de Mornay, until shortly after 1685, when Louis XIV decided on the revocation of the Edict of Nantes, ending the limited toleration of Protestantism in France.

== Amyraldism ==
The Academy was the home of Amyraldism, an important strand of Protestant thought of the seventeenth century. Also called Saumurianism or hypothetical universalism, it was a moderate Calvinist movement, remaining within Calvinism.

The French theologians at Saumur, in the 17th century, taught also that Christ came into the world to do whatever was necessary for the salvation of men. But God, foreseeing that, if left to themselves, men would universally reject the offers of mercy, elected some to be the subjects of his saving grace by which they are brought to faith and repentance. According to this view of the plan of salvation, election is subordinate to redemption. God first redeems all and then elects some.

The Helvetic Consensus and Westminster Confession were concerned to combat the tendency Amyraldism represented.

== Faculty ==
- Moses Amyraut
- Robert Boyd
- Franco Burgersdijk, professor of philosophy (1616–1619)
- John Cameron, one of the Academy's first professors.
- Louis Cappel
- Jean-Robert Chouet
- Mark Duncan
- Franciscus Gomarus
- Tanneguy Le Fèvre
- Claude Pajon
- Josué de la Place (Placeus)
- Adam Steuart

== Students ==
- Jakob Abbadie
- Peter Allix
- Isaac de Beausobre
- Isaac Beeckman
- Daniel Brevint
- Paul Colomiès
- André Dacier
- Charles Drelincourt
- Samuel Maresius
- Abraham de Moivre
- Jakob Reefsen
- Paul de Rapin

== See also ==
- List of early modern universities in Europe
