= Amyraldism =

Christian doctrine

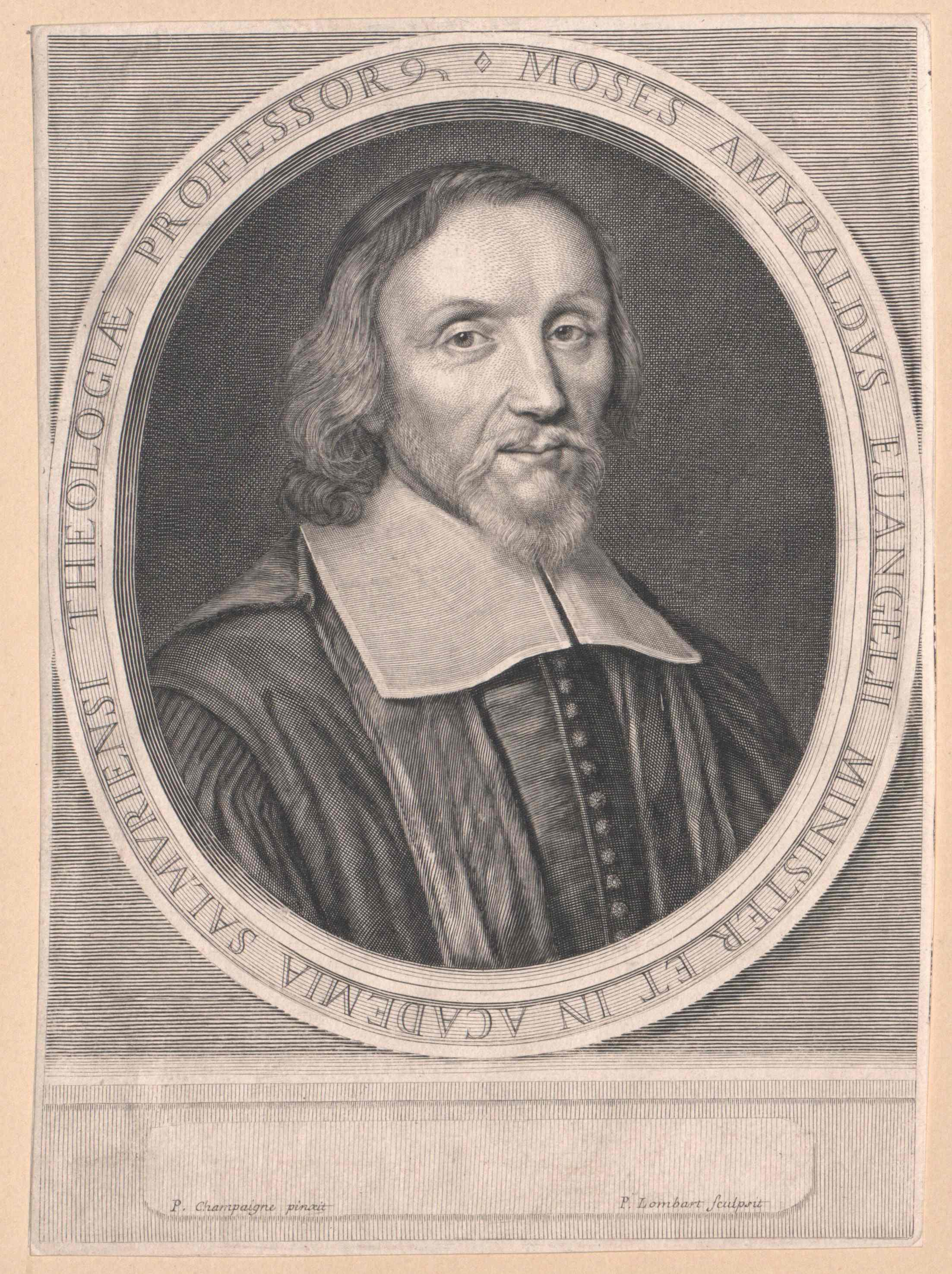
Moses Amyraut (1596–1664), after whom Amyraldism is named.

Amyraldism (sometimes Amyraldianism) is a Calvinist doctrine. It is also known as the School of Saumur, post redemptionism, moderate Calvinism, or hypothetical universalism. It is one of several hypothetical universalist systems.

Amyraldism is the belief that God decreed Christ's atonement, prior to his decree of election, for all alike if they believe, but he then elected those whom he will bring to faith in Christ, seeing that none would believe on their own, and thereby preserving the Calvinist doctrine of unconditional election. The efficacy of the atonement remains limited to those who believe.

This doctrine is named after its formulator, Moses Amyraut, and is viewed as a variety of Calvinism in that it maintains the particularity of sovereign grace in the application of the atonement. However, detractors such as B. B. Warfield have termed it "an inconsistent and therefore unstable form of Calvinism". Amyraut additionally proposed an alternative view to covenant theology in which the Mosaic covenant was seen as neither a covenant of grace nor one of works, but rather as a third substance, being a subservient covenant.

== History ==
=== Background ===
Hypothetical universalist teachings may be found in the writings of early Reformed theologians including Heinrich Bullinger, Wolfgang Musculus, Zacharias Ursinus, and Girolamo Zanchi. Several theologians who signed the Canons of Dort were hypothetical universalists.

Moses Amyraut, originally a lawyer, but converted to the study of theology by the reading of Calvin's Institutes of the Christian Religion, an able divine and voluminous writer, developed the doctrine of hypothetical or conditional universalism, for which his teacher, John Cameron (1580–1625), a Scot, and for two years headmaster of Saumur Academy, had prepared the way. His object was not to set aside but to moderate Calvinism by ingrafting this doctrine upon the particularism of election, and thereby to fortify it against the objections of Roman Catholics, by whom the French Protestants, or Huguenots, were surrounded and threatened. Being employed by the Reformed Synod in important diplomatic negotiations with the government, he came in frequent contact with bishops, and with Cardinal Richelieu, who esteemed him highly. His system is an approach, not so much to Arminianism, which he decidedly rejected, as to Lutheranism, which likewise teaches a universal atonement and a limited election.

Amyraut maintained the Calvinistic premises of an eternal foreordination and foreknowledge of God, whereby he caused all things to pass, the good efficiently, the bad permissively. He also admitted the double decree of election and reprobation, but his view on double predestination is modified slightly by his view of double election. He also taught that God foreordained a universal salvation through the universal sacrifice of Christ offered to all alike, on condition of faith, so that on the part of God's will and desire, the grace is universal, but as regards the condition it is particular, or only for those who do not reject it which would thereby make it ineffective.

The universal redemption scheme precedes the particular election scheme, and not vice versa. He reasons from the benevolence of God towards his creatures; the traditional Reformed presentation of predestination, he thought, improperly reasons from the result and makes facts interpret the decrees. Amyraut distinguished between objective grace which is offered to all, and subjective grace in the heart which is given only to the elect. He also makes a distinction between natural ability and moral ability, or the power to believe and the willingness to believe; man possesses the former but not the latter in consequence of inherent depravity. It, therefore, takes an act of God to illuminate the mind, thereby engaging the will towards action. He was disposed, like Huldrych Zwingli, to extend the grace of God beyond the limits of the visible Church, inasmuch as God by his general providence operates upon the heathen, as in the case of Malachi 1:11,14, and may produce in them a sort of unconscious Christianity, a faith without knowledge; while within the Church he operates more fully and clearly through the means of grace.

Those who never heard of Christ are condemned if they reject the general grace of providence, but the same persons would also reject Christ if he were offered to them. As regards the result, Amyraut agreed with the particularists. His ideology is unavailable, except for those in whom God previously works the condition of faith: for those who are included in the particular decree of election.

Amyraut's doctrine created a commotion in the Reformed Churches of France, the Dutch Republic, and Switzerland. Jean Daillé (1594–1670), David Blondel (1591–1655), and others considered it innocent and consistent with the decrees of the Synod of Dort, where German Reformed and Anglican delegates professed similar views against the supralapsarianism of Gomarus. But Pierre Du Moulin (Molinæus) (since 1621 professor of the rival theological school of Sedan), Friedrich Spanheim (1600–1649, Professor in Leiden), André Rivet (1572–1651, Professor in Leiden), and the theologians of Geneva opposed it.

Similar charges were leveled against the Puritan great, Richard Baxter, who dealt frequently with Cyrus and Peter du Moulin. In Geneva, the chief opponent of Amyraut's scheme was Francis Turretin (1623–1687). Amyraut's teaching was not, however, considered to be heretical or outside the Reformed confessions by its opponents.

The friends of Amyraut emphasised the love, benevolence, and impartial justice of God as well as the numerous passages in Scripture which teach that God loves 'the whole world', that he will have 'all men to be saved', that Christ died 'not for our sins only, but also for the sins of the whole world', that 'he shut up all in unbelief that he might have mercy upon all'. On the other hand, it was objected that God does not really will and intend what is never accomplished; that he could not purpose an end without providing adequate means; God did not actually offer salvation to all; and that a hypothetical universalism based on an unlikely condition is an unfruitful abstraction.

The national Synods at Alençon, 1637; at Charenton, 1645; and at Loudun, 1659 (the last synod permitted by the French government), decided against the excommunication of Amyraut but delimited his views in order to avoid further variance with historic Reformed orthodoxy. He gave the assurance that he did not change the doctrine but only the method of instruction. His opponents allowed that the idea of a universal grace by which no one was actually saved unless included in the particular, effective decree of election, was permissible. In this way hypothetical universalism was sanctioned as a permissible view, along with the particularism that had characterized historic Reformed orthodoxy, and a schism in the French Church was avoided. The literary controversy continued for several years longer and developed a large amount of learning and ability, until it was brought to an abrupt close by the political oppressions of the Reformed Church in France.

=== 17th century England and Scotland ===
John Davenant (1576–1641), like Amyraut a student of John Cameron, was an English delegate at the Synod of Dort and influenced some of the members of the Westminster Assembly. He promoted "hypothetical universalism, a general atonement in the sense of intention as well as sufficiency, a common blessing of the cross, and a conditional salvation. The "root principle of the Davenant School" was the "notion of a universal desire in God for the salvation of all men." In the floor debate on redemption at the Westminster Assembly, Edmund Calamy the Elder of the Davenant School attempted to insert Amyraldism into the Catechism.

Richard Baxter held to a form of Amyraldism, although he was less Calvinistic than Amyraut. He "devised an eclectic middle route between Reformed, Arminian, and Roman doctrines of grace: interpreting the kingdom of God in terms of contemporary political ideas, he explained Christ's death as an act of universal redemption (penal and vicarious, but not substitutionary), in virtue of which God has made a new law offering pardon and amnesty to the penitent. Repentance and faith, being obedience to this law, are the believer's personal saving righteousness… the fruit of the seeds which Baxter sowed was neonomian Moderatism in Scotland and moralistic Unitarianism in England."

Popularised in England by the Reformed pastor Richard Baxter, Amyraldism also gained strong adherence among the Congregationalists and some Presbyterians in the American colonies, during the 17th and 18th centuries.

=== Recent ===
In the United States, Amyraldism can be found among various evangelical groups, such as Southern Baptists, the Evangelical Free Church of America, the dispensationalists in independent Bible Churches and independent Baptist churches. In Australia, many in the Anglican Diocese of Sydney hold to a modified "four point" Calvinism, while in England, one author, Dr. Alan Clifford, pastor of the Norwich Reformed Church, tirelessly promotes Amyraldism in self-published pamphlets such as Amyraut Affirmed. Yet "Five point" Calvinism remains prevalent especially in more conservative groups among the Reformed and Presbyterian churches, Reformed Baptists, among evangelical Anglicans in England and in some non-denominational evangelical churches.

== Contrasting views ==
Amyraldism has been strongly criticized in recent years by contemporary Calvinist theologians who argue that one cannot accept that Christ died for all people in the world if not all are saved. That belief either requires a second payment for sin at the judgment, the adoption of a form of universal reconciliation, or abandonment of the penal substitution theory of the atonement.

Reformed theologian, pastor, and author R. C. Sproul suggests there is confusion about what the doctrine of limited atonement actually teaches. While he considered it possible for a person to believe four points without believing the fifth, he claimed that a person who really understands the other four points must believe in limited atonement because of what Martin Luther called a resistless logic.
