= Sauquoit =

Sauqoit may refer to:

- Sauquoit, New York, a hamlet
- Sauquoit Creek, a river in Oneida County, New York
- Sauquoit Valley, a valley in Oneida County, New York
