= Litchfield, New York =

- Town
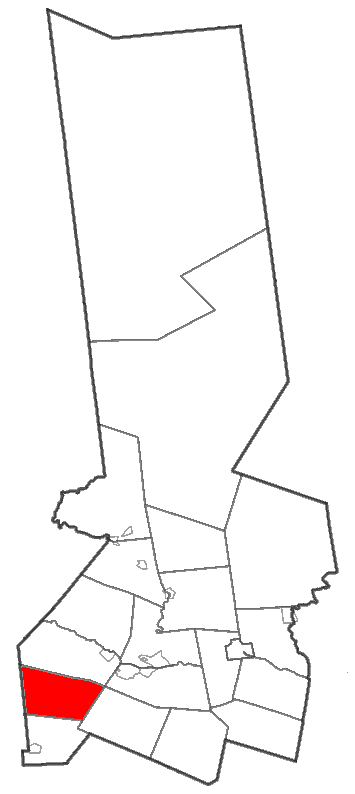
- Location of Litchfield in Herkimer County

- Location within New York Location within the United States
- Coordinates: 42°58′40″N 75°8′44″W
- Country: United States
- State: New York
- County: Herkimer

Area
  - Total: 30.05 sq mi (77.84 km^{2})
  - Land: 29.99 sq mi (77.68 km^{2})
  - Water: 0.062 sq mi (0.16 km^{2})
- Elevation: 1,496 ft (456 m)

Population (2020)
  - Total: 1,444
  - Density: 48.1/sq mi (18.59/km^{2})
- Time zone: UTC-5 (Eastern (EST))
  - Summer (DST): UTC-4 (EDT)
- ZIP Codes: 13322 (Clayville); 13340 (Frankfort); 13357 (Ilion); 13456 (Sauquoit); 13491 (West Winfield)
- FIPS code: 36-043-42664
- GNIS feature ID: 0979156
- Website: www.townoflitchfield.com

Litchfield is a town in Herkimer County, New York, United States. The population was 1,444 at the 2020 census, down from 1,513 at the 2010 census. The town is named after Litchfield, Connecticut, the source of some early settlers of the city.

The town of Litchfield is in the southwestern part of the county and is southeast of Utica.

== History ==
Settlement began around 1786 at Wheelocks Hill.

The town of Litchfield was established from part of the town of German Flatts in 1796. Part of the town was used to form the town of Winfield in 1816.

12-year-old Sara Anne Wood disappeared from Litchfield in 1993.

"Litchfield Penitentiary", a fictional women's prison in Litchfield, is the setting for the Netflix original series Orange Is the New Black.

== Geography ==
According to the United States Census Bureau, the town has a total area of 30.0 square miles (77.8 km^{2}), of which 30.0 square miles (77.7 km^{2}) are land and 0.1 square miles (0.2 km^{2}), or 0.20%, are water.

The western town line is the border of Oneida County.

== Demographics ==
Historical population
Census	Pop.	Note	%±
1820	1,729		—
1830	1,750		1.2%
1840	1,672		−4.5%
1850	1,676		0.2%
1860	1,520		−9.3%
1870	1,384		−8.9%
1880	1,218		−12.0%
1890	1,055		−13.4%
1900	931		−11.8%
1910	803		−13.7%
1920	747		−7.0%
1930	712		−4.7%
1940	779		9.4%
1950	776		−0.4%
1960	963		24.1%
1970	961		−0.2%
1980	1,187		23.5%
1990	1,414		19.1%
2000	1,464		3.5%
2010	1,513		3.3%
2020	1,444		−4.6%
U.S. Decennial Census

As of the census of 2000, there were 1,453 people, 515 households, and 399 families residing in the town. The population density was 49.1 inhabitants per square mile (19.0/km^{2}). There were 670 housing units at an average density of 22.6 per square mile (8.7/km^{2}). The racial makeup of the town was 98.62% White, 0.07% African American, 0.55% Native American, 0.21% Asian, 0.07% from other races, and 0.48% from two or more races. Hispanic or Latino of any race were 0.62% of the population.

There were 515 households, out of which 39.0% had children under the age of 18 living with them, 67.0% were married couples living together, 5.2% had a female householder with no husband present, and 22.5% were non-families. 17.5% of all households were made up of individuals, and 5.8% had someone living alone who was 65 years of age or older. The average household size was 2.82 and the average family size was 3.18.

In the town, the population was spread out, with 29.3% under the age of 18, 5.8% from 18 to 24, 29.4% from 25 to 44, 24.8% from 45 to 64, and 10.7% who were 65 years of age or older. The median age was 37 years. For every 100 females, there were 104.1 males. For every 100 females age 18 and over, there were 107.1 males.

The median income for a household in the town was $42,404, and the median income for a family was $48,750. Males had a median income of $30,163 versus $23,587 for females. The per capita income for the town was $16,431. About 5.3% of families and 9.7% of the population were below the poverty line, including 17.3% of those under age 18 and 6.9% of those age 65 or over.

== Notable people ==
- Adelbert Cronkhite, U.S. Army major general
- George Gage, member of the Illinois Senate
- Newton Littlejohn, member of the Wisconsin Senate
- Philo Remington, president of E. Remington and Sons
- John Curtiss Underwood, U.S. District Court judge in Virginia

== Communities and locations in Litchfield ==
- Bennett Hill – An elevation located west of Parker Corners.
- Cedar Lake – A hamlet in the western part of the town on County Road 170, north of a small lake of the same name.
- Cedarville – A hamlet at the southeastern corner of the town on County Roads 18, 49, and 79.
- Cranes Corners – A hamlet in the northeastern part of the town on County Road 79.
- Days Corners – A hamlet north of Cedar Lake on County Road 107.
- Dry Hill – An elevation by the western town line.
- Goodiers Corners – A location northwest of Cedar Lake.
- Gulph – A hamlet at the northern town line on County Road 171.
- Ilion Gorge – A valley in the eastern part of Litchfield, containing Steele Creek.
- Jerusalem Hill – A location southwest of Cranes Corners at County Roads 169 and 255.
- Kinne Corners – A location at the northern town line at County Roads 27, 79, and 167.
- Norwich Corners – A hamlet in the northwestern corner of the town on County Road 59.
- Parker Corners – A location near the northern town line on County Road 166.
- Steele Creek – A stream near the eastern town line.
- Wheelock Hill (formerly Snows Bush) – An elevation north of Jerusalem Hill.

The now-defunct hamlet of North Litchfield is also listed in the official New York State Gazetteer, maintained and published by the New York State Department of Health, which includes numerous defunct hamlets and towns, some with alternate or archaic spellings.
