= Paris, New York =

- Town
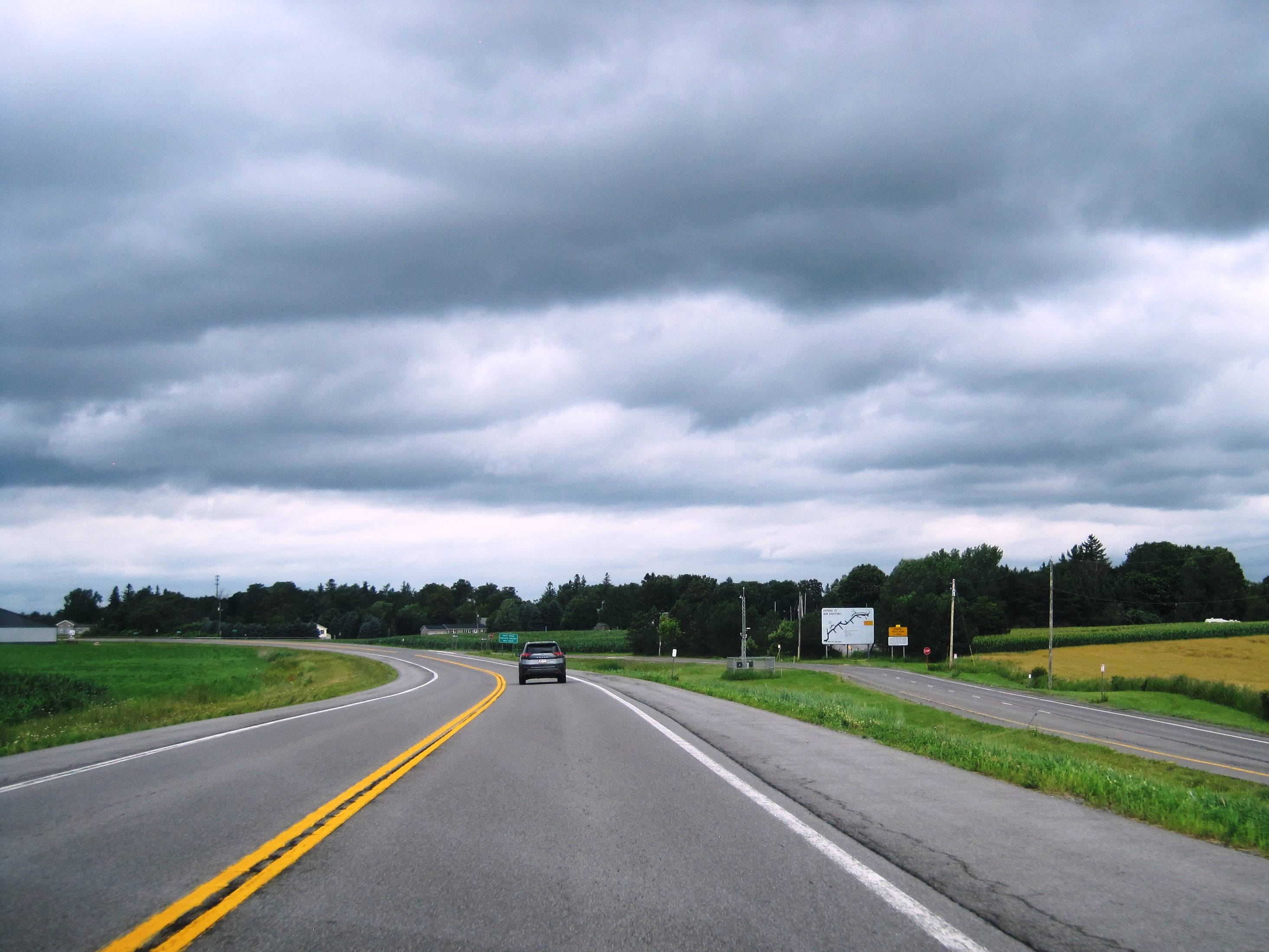
- NY 12 northbound outside of the hamlet of Paris

- Location in Oneida County and the state of New York.
- Coordinates: 42°59′0″N 75°16′5″W
- Country: United States
- State: New York
- County: Oneida

Government
  - Type: Town Council
  - Town Supervisor: James Christian Jr. (R)
  - Town Council: Members' List: • Dean J. Tibbitts (R); • Kevin Fahy (R); • Ralph Lucia (R); • Gary R. Tuttle (R)

Area
  - Total: 31.49 sq mi (81.56 km^{2})
  - Land: 31.48 sq mi (81.52 km^{2})
  - Water: 0.015 sq mi (0.04 km^{2})
- Elevation: 1,299 ft (396 m)

Population (2020)
  - Total: 4,332
  - Density: 137.6/sq mi (53.14/km^{2})
- Time zone: UTC-5 (Eastern (EST))
  - Summer (DST): UTC-4 (EDT)
- ZIP Codes: 13318 (Cassville); 13322 (Clayville); 13456 (Sauquoit); 13323 (Clinton)
- Area code: 315
- FIPS code: 36-56330
- GNIS feature ID: 0979341
- Website: townofparisny.gov

Paris is a town in Oneida County, New York, United States. The town is in the southeast part of the county and is south of Utica. The population was 4,332 at the 2020 census. The town was named after an early benefactor, Colonel Isaac Paris.

== History ==
The town was formed in 1792 from part of the town of Whitestown. In 1795, part of Paris was used to found the town of Sherburne (now in Chenango County). In 1827, the town of Kirkland, New York was separated from the town of Paris.

The St. Paul's Church and Cemetery at Paris Hill was listed on the National Register of Historic Places in 1996.

== Notable people ==
- Asa Gray, botanist
- Edmund Ellsworth, Western Pioneer
- Orson S. Head, lawyer, Wisconsin State Senator
- Joseph E. Irish, clergyman, Wisconsin State Senator
- Gerrit P. Judd, physician, missionary to Kingdom of Hawaii
- Arthur Cushman McGiffert, theologian
- David Pendleton Oakerhater, Cheyenne warrior, Episcopal deacon and saint
- Michael O'Donoghue, writer and performer
- La Mott W. Rhodes, lawyer and New York State Assemblyman
- Edward Tompkins, California State Senator
- Charlemagne Tower, lawyer, soldier, and businessman
- Albert J. Winegar, Wisconsin State Assemblyman

== Geography ==
According to the United States Census Bureau, the town has a total area of 31.5 square miles (82 km^{2}), of which 31.5 square miles (82 km^{2}) is land and 0.05% is water.

The eastern town line is the border of Herkimer County.

== Demographics ==
Historical population
Census	Pop.	Note	%±
1800	4,721		—
1810	5,418		14.8%
1820	6,707		23.8%
1830	2,765		−58.8%
1840	2,844		2.9%
1850	4,283		50.6%
1860	3,762		−12.2%
1870	3,575		−5.0%
1880	3,573		−0.1%
1890	3,211		−10.1%
1900	2,626		−18.2%
1910	2,659		1.3%
1920	3,004		13.0%
1930	2,994		−0.3%
1940	3,073		2.6%
1950	3,459		12.6%
1960	4,219		22.0%
1970	4,579		8.5%
1980	4,456		−2.7%
1990	4,414		−0.9%
2000	4,609		4.4%
2010	4,411		−4.3%
2020	4,332		−1.8%
U.S. Decennial Census

As of the census of 2000, there were 4,609 people, 1,714 households, and 1,273 families. The population density was 146.6 inhabitants per square mile (56.6/km^{2}). There were 1,806 housing units at an average density of 57.4 per square mile (22.2/km^{2}). The racial makeup of the town was 98.31% White, 0.35% African American, 0.07% Native American, 0.22% Asian, 0.02% Pacific Islander, 0.20% from other races, and 0.85% from two or more races. Hispanic or Latino of any race were 0.54% of the population.

There were 1,714 households, out of which 38.4% had children under the age of 18 living with them, 60.3% were married couples living together, 9.3% had a female householder with no husband present, and 25.7% were non-families. 22.2% of all households were made up of individuals, and 9.7% had someone living alone who was 65 years of age or older. The average household size was 2.68 and the average family size was 3.15.

In the town, the population was spread out, with 27.3% under the age of 18, 7.1% from 18 to 24, 28.0% from 25 to 44, 25.6% from 45 to 64, and 12.0% who were 65 years of age or older. The median age was 39 years. For every 100 females, there were 97.0 males. For every 100 females age 18 and over, there were 97.2 males.

The median income for a household in the town was $41,571, and the median income for a family was $50,379. Males had a median income of $35,867 versus $26,315 for females. The per capita income for the town was $18,446. About 6.0% of families and 7.3% of the population were below the poverty line, including 9.7% of those under age 18 and 3.6% of those age 65 or over.

== Communities and locations in Paris ==
- Cassville – A hamlet west of Richfield Junction. It was named after Lewis Cass after it was founded in 1803.
- Clayville – A village in the southeastern part of the town.
- Grange Hill – An elevation located east of Paris.
- Greens Crossing – A hamlet east of Paris Station.
- Ludlow Corners – A location southeast of Clayville.
- Paris – A hamlet.
- Paris Station – A hamlet south of Paris hamlet near the western town boundary.
- Richfield Junction – A hamlet near the southern town line on NY 8.
- Sauquoit – This hamlet in the northern part of the town is the location of the town government. It was the second settlement made in the town.
- Sauquoit Creek – An important stream flowing through the town.
- Tassel Hill – Highest point in Oneida County. Located in the southern part of the town, east of NY 12 on the borders of the towns of Bridgewater, Marshall, and Sangerfield.

== Education ==
Most of the town of Paris is in Sauquoit Valley Central School District. There are portions in other school districts: the Clinton Central School District,, the New Hartford Central School District, Waterville Central School District, and Mount Markham Central School District.
