= Josué de la Place =

French Reformed theologian

Josué de la Place (also, Josua or Joshua Placaeus or Placeus; c. 1596 – 17 August 1665 or possibly 1655) was a Reformed theologian who was born at Saumur, France. He is known as the originator of the "mediate view" of the imputation of sin, whereby original sin is considered to be an inherent depravity in man. This view is opposed to the "federalist view", whereby the God immediately imputes original sin to all men, as a consequence of Adam's sin, and thus this original sin becomes the cause of actual sin.

== Career ==
Placeus became pastor at Nantes in 1625 and was professor of theology at the Academy of Saumur from 1633 until his death.

== Theology ==
Placeus together with Moise Amyraut and Louis Cappel belong, as followers of John Cameron, to that theological movement at Saumur which in contrast with the orthodox Academy of Sedan sought to moderate Calvinistic doctrine by emphasizing the ethical and common human elements, without, however, departing from the fundamental principles.

From the supreme value of the accountability of every human soul, Placeus especially drew the conclusion against the imputation of Adam's actual sin. In defense of the doctrine that the sin of Adam could be reckoned to his descendants only as mediated by the inherited sinful subjective state he pointed out that John Calvin knew nothing of an immediate imputation and that the same was denied by Pietro Martire and Daniel Chamier, but did not go so far as to justify himself by the view of Huldrych Zwingli that hereditary guilt was no more than the guilt of every individual. The national synod of Charenton (1644) under the leadership of Antoine Garissoles, representing the constituency of Montauban, opposed this assertion by adopting a decree to be subscribed by all pastors and candidates. Placeus issued later his vindication, Disputatio de imputatione primi peccati Adami (Saumur, 1655). The national synod of Loudun, in 1659, withdrew all threatening measures of discipline, but the Zürich orthodoxy did not rest content until in the Helvetic Consensus of 1675 it repudiated with Saumurism as a whole the mere "imputation mediate and consequent."

The mediate view was later taken up by New England theology.

== Bibliography ==
- Placeus' Opera omnia were published in 2 vols., Franeker, 1699, Aubencit, 1702.
- E. and E. Haag, La France protestante, ed. H. L. Bordier, vi.309 sqq., Paris, 1889
- Johann Georg Walch, Einleitung in die Religions-Sereitigkeiten...ausser der evangelisch-lutherischen Kirche, iii.890 sqq, Jena, 1734
- Bartholmess, in Bulletin de la société de l'hist. du protestantisme françaís, 1853;
- Saigey, in Revue de théologie, Oct., 1855;
- Lichtenberger, ESR, xi.489 sqq.
- Chisholm, Hugh, ed. (1911). "La Place, Josué de" . Encyclopædia Britannica. Vol. 16 (11th ed.). Cambridge University Press. p. 200.
