= George Gage =

George Gage may refer to:

- George Gage (diplomat) (fl. 1614–1640), English Roman Catholic political agent
- George Gage (Ringatū minister) (c. 1896–1961), New Zealand Māori minister
- George Gage, 7th Viscount Gage (1932–1993), English baronet, Irish peer, and landowner
- George Gage (politician) (1813–1899), Illinois politician
- George W. Gage (judge) (1854–1926), associate justice of the South Carolina Supreme Court
- George W. Gage (baseball) (1812–1875), American baseball executive
