= Senator Tompkins =

Senator Tompkins may refer to:

- Bernard Tompkins (1904–1965), New York State Senate
- Edward Tompkins (1815–1872), California State Senate
- Minthorne Tompkins (1807–1881), New York State Senate
- Nathaniel Tompkins (1879–1949), Maine State Senate

== See also ==
- A. Pearce Tomkins (1875–1937), Wisconsin State Senate
