= Albert J. Winegar =

American politician (1868–1935)

Albert James Winegar (October 28, 1868 – April 30, 1935) was an American mechanical engineer and politician.

Born in Clayville, New York, in the town of Paris, Winegar moved with his parents to Moody County, Dakota Territory in 1878. Winegar graduated from Dakota Agricultural College (now South Dakota State University) in 1892 and was a mechanical engineer. In 1896, Winegar moved to Beloit, Wisconsin where he worked as a mechanical engineer. He also worked in the insurance business and owned an automobile service station in Beloit, Wisconsin. Winegar served on the Beloit Common Council and was a Republican. In 1915, Winegar served in the Wisconsin State Assembly. During World War I, Winegar served in the United States Army Air Service. Winegar died in a hospital in Beloit, Wisconsin.
