= Sauquoit Creek =

River in the United States of America

- Location of the mouth of the Sauquoit Creek in New York State. Sauquoit Creek (the United States)

Location
- Country: United States
- State: New York
- County: Oneida

Physical characteristics
- Source
  - location: Paris
  - coordinates: 42°58′28″N 75°18′57″W
- Mouth: Mohawk River
  - location: Whitesboro
  - coordinates: 43°07′29″N 75°16′05″W
- Length: 17 mi (27 km)
- Basin size: 61.7 sq mi (160 km^{2})

Sauquoit Creek is a 17.0-mile-long (27.4 km) river in New York, United States. It lies within the southern part of Oneida County. The creek flows eastward, then turns sharply and flows generally northward through the Sauquoit Valley to the Mohawk River, entering the river on the east side of Whitesboro. It is therefore part of the Hudson River watershed.

== History ==
The word Sauquoit is a form of spelling of the Oneida word Sa-da-quoit, which means "smooth pebbles in a stream".

The first cotton mills in the area were located on the Sauquoit at New York Mills in 1804.

In 1858, a wooden rail bridge collapsed over this creek resulted in nine deaths.

== Hydrology ==
The United States Geological Survey (USGS) maintains a stream gauge on the creek two miles (3.2 km) upstream from the mouth and 420 feet (130 m) upstream from NY 5A. The station has been in operation since September 2014. The station had a maximum discharge of 6,170 cubic feet per second (175 m^{3}/s) and a gauge height of 10.17 feet (3.10 m) on October 31, 2019. It had minimum discharge of 13 cubic feet per second (0.37 m^{3}/s) per second on many days in September 2018 and a minimum gauge height of 10.17 feet (3.10 m) on August 10, 2016.

== Flooding ==
Flooding is common in the portion of Whitesboro along the creek, often causing road closures. One of the most impactful floods occurred on the night of Halloween 2019, when residents were evacuated and houses were destroyed. A FEMA buyout is being pursued by the village of Whitesboro.

== Fishing ==
Sauquoit Creek offers trout fishing along 5.6 miles (9.0 km) of Public Fishing Rights easements. The stream is stocked annually approximately 6,000 yearling brown trout, in addition to 330 two-year-old fish. Wild brown and brook trout are found in the stream's headwaters.

== Management ==
The creek is managed by Sauquoit Creek Basin Intermunicipal Commission (SCBIC). They are responsible for managing issues related watershed management, flooding, and stormwater along Sauquoit Creek.

== Communities along the creek ==
- Clayville
- Sauquoit
- Chadwicks
- Washington Mills
- New Hartford
- New York Mills
- Whitesboro

== See also ==
- List of rivers in New York
