= Tassel Hill =

Mountain in New York, United States

- Location within New York Location within the United States

Highest point
- Elevation: 1,942 feet (592 m)
- Prominence: 400 feet (120 m)
- Listing: New York County High Points 38th
- Coordinates: 42°56′27″N 75°19′00″W

Geography
- Location: SW of Clayville, New York, U.S.
- Topo map: USGS Cassville

Tassel Hill is a mountain located in the Central New York Region southwest of Clayville, New York. Tassel Hill is the highest point in Oneida County and it is ranked 38 of 62 on the list of New York County High Points.
