= Herbert Haag =

Roman Catholic theologian and biblical scholar (1915–2001)

Herbert Haag (11 February 1915 – 23 August 2001) was a Swiss Roman Catholic theologian and biblical scholar of German origin.

Haag was born in Singen am Hohentwiel. After studying theology in Paris for the diocese of Basel in 1940, he was ordained a priest and worked for several years as a pastor in Lucerne. In 1942 Haag attained his PhD at the University of Fribourg. From 1948 to 1960, he taught Old Testament studies at the Theological Faculty of Lucerne, and from 1960 to 1980 he held the chair of Old Testament at the Catholic Theological Faculty at the University of Tübingen.

Known in particular for his biblical scholarship and exegesis, he edited a well-known Bible dictionary. Haag's 1969 book Farewell to the Devil is noted for having been the first Catholic denial in the modern era of the existence of the devil as constitutive of the Christian faith, claiming it to be merely linked to a cultural frame inherited from both Judaism and paganism. Haag's position was criticized by then Cardinal Ratzinger. Pope Paul VI reacted in a rescript of the Congregation for the Doctrine of the Faith in 1972 on the topic of the existence of the devil, showing Haag's theological position to be erroneous. Haag also criticized dogmas of church doctrine, such as original sin, apostolic succession, homosexuality, celibacy of the clergy and the ban on the ordination of women. In his last years he emerged as a critic of the institutional church.

In 1981 Haag had signed an open letter to Swiss newspapers contending that a wrong had been done to Hans Küng in 1979, when the Vatican decreed that Küng was no longer recognised as a Catholic theologian because of his denial of papal infallibility. In 1985 the Herbert Haag Foundation for Freedom in the Church was founded. The Foundation awards the Herbert Haag Prize.

Herbert Haag died in Lucerne at the age of 86.

== Works ==
- editor, Bibel-Lexikon. 2nd edition. Einsiedeln and Zurich: Benziger, 1968.
- Biblische Schöpfungslehre und kirchliche Erbsündenlehre. Stuttgarter Bibelstudien 10. Stuttgart: Katholisches Bibelwerk, 1966; 4th edition 1968. and Haag, Herbert (1969). Is Original Sin in Scripture?. Sheed and Ward. ISBN 978-0-8362-0250-2.
- Haag, Herbert (1985). Der Gottesknecht bei Deuterojesaja (in German). Darmstadt: Wissenschaftliche Buchgesellschaft. ISBN 3-534-09045-4. OCLC 14351323.
- Haag, Herbert; Elliger, Katharina (1986). Stört nicht die Liebe : die Diskriminierung der Sexualität : ein Verrat an der Bibel (in German). Olten: Walter-Verlag. ISBN 3-530-30101-9. OCLC 16357476.
- Haag, Herbert (2000). Abschied vom Teufel. Vom christlichen Umgang mit dem Bösen (in German). Düsseldorf. ISBN 978-3-545-70016-1. OCLC 845369664.
- Haag, Herbert (2000). Nur wer sich ändert, bleibt sich treu : für eine neue Verfassung der katholischen Kirche (in German). Freiburg: Herder. ISBN 3-451-26891-4. OCLC 46380504. Perlentaucher-Links (in German)

== Awards ==
- 2000: Prix Courage
- 2001: Pin of Lucerne

== See also ==
- Original sin § Criticism
