= Murder of Sara Anne Wood =

1993 child murder in New York

Sara Anne Wood
- Wood, pictured in 1992
- Born: March 4, 1981; New York, U.S.
- Disappeared: August 18, 1993 (aged 12); Litchfield, New York, U.S. 43.01319°N 75.20533°W
- Status: Missing for 33 years, 1 month and 7 days
- Known for: Missing person
- Height: 5 ft 0 in (1.52 m)
- Parents: Robert Wood (father); Frances Wood (mother)
- Distinguishing features: Caucasian female. 96 pounds. Shoulder-length curly brown hair, blue eyes, and facial freckles. Scars on both legs. One toe on each of her feet is disabled.

Sara Anne Wood (March 4, 1981 – disappeared August 18, 1993) was a twelve-year-old American girl who disappeared while riding her bicycle home from Norwich Corners Church in Sauquoit, New York. She is believed to have been abducted less than half a mile from her own home by convicted child murderer Lewis Stephen Lent Jr.

Lent later pleaded guilty to both Wood's abduction and murder and that of a twelve-year-old boy named James Bernardo, whom he had murdered in 1990. He received a mandatory sentence of life imprisonment for Bernardo's murder, and a sentence of 25 years' imprisonment to life for Wood's abduction and murder.

Wood's abduction and murder ultimately inspired numerous initiatives by both law enforcement and the public within and around New York to raise public vigilance of the issues regarding missing children and child safety to prevent child abduction and sexual exploitation. Her family also established the Sara Anne Wood Rescue Center, which ultimately became a New York branch of the National Center for Missing & Exploited Children.

Despite the intense publicity surrounding Wood's disappearance and repeated efforts to locate her body, her body has never been found.

== Background ==
Sara Anne Wood was born in New York on March 4, 1981, the youngest of three children born to Robert and Frances Wood. Her father was a pastor at Norwich Corners Presbyterian Church in the rural community of Sauquoit, New York, where she and her two siblings, Dusty (17) and Nikki (14), worshipped. The family resided at 300 Hacadam Road in Sauquoit.

Wood has been described as an intelligent, religious, lively and exuberant child with a love of dancing and poetry. Her brother, Dusty, would also recollect his sister was a devoted fan of country musician Dolly Parton and had a giving personality. Similar sentiments were also made by staff and pupils at Wood's elementary school, with one teacher, Nancy Waldeck, later recollecting: "She was just the happiest little girl ...The thing I remember most is that she would just giggle all the time and she could get me laughing and get the whole class laughing, and I would literally have to turn around and think to myself, 'Okay, I'm the teacher. Stop laughing at everything that comes out of her mouth.'"

== Disappearance ==
Shortly after a family shopping trip on the morning of August 18, 1993, Wood rode her bicycle from the family home to the Norwich Corners Presbyterian Church with view to attending Vacation Bible school. According to her older brother, Wood had been in a cheerful mood immediately prior to leaving the family home—singing the Dolly Parton song "9 to 5" aloud—before climbing on her bike and riding to her father's church as she called to her brother, "See you later."

Wood was last seen at approximately 2:30 p.m., riding her bicycle up a steep hill on Hacadam Road in Frankfort, New York, close to Norwich Corners Church on adjoining Roberts Road, en route to her home following her religious classes. She was carrying a display board, a church song book, and Vacation Bible school literature. The location of her final sighting was less than half a mile from her home. At the time of this sighting, Wood was riding her bicycle, although according to her abductor, she had dismounted her bike and was walking alongside the road pushing the cycle at the time he spotted her.

At the time of Wood's disappearance, she was wearing a pink T-shirt with the words "Guess Who" embroidered upon the front, turquoise blue shorts, and brown sandals. She was also wearing prescription glasses.

=== Discoveries ===
Within an hour of Wood's abduction, her parents, brother and sister became alarmed by her absence. The child was reported missing to police later the same afternoon, and several hundred troopers and volunteer firefighters searched several dozens of square miles of terrain. The Wood family immediately pursued all tangible methods to locate her, including conducting searches around their neighborhood, and printing and distributing missing persons flyers. (Note: In 2019, Wood's brother, Dusty, would recollect that he and his family almost immediately pursued all options available to them to locate Sara and raise awareness of her disappearance, stating: "We went bonkers with Xeroxes. Like, that day ... it was pretty obvious she was missing. We quickly moved into trying to find her.") Her bicycle was soon discovered leaning against a tree several yards from Hacadam Road. A search of the area revealed her coloring book and crayons hidden in an area of brush close to her bicycle, and investigators rapidly determined the child had been transported from the site of her abduction in a vehicle.

=== Search efforts ===
An extensive search of the vicinity of Wood's disappearance and other potential areas of interest was conducted over the following five days by both state police and forest rangers; these ground level efforts and extensive public appeals for information leading to Wood's whereabouts and safe return failed to either locate the child or yield clues to her whereabouts, although the extensive news coverage of her disappearance galvanized much of the public throughout upstate New York and the ongoing efforts to locate Wood received considerable media attention. More than 1,000 leads were received and either pursued or discounted, and a public reward for Wood's safe return ultimately reached over $150,000.

Police searches were bolstered by hundreds of members of the public, who assisted in the search and provided refreshments for volunteers and investigators alike. Teal ribbons symbolizing Wood were also placed in numerous public locations. (Note: These symbolic ribbons were colored teal in honor of one of Wood's favorite colors.)

==== Nationwide outreach ====
By the week following Wood's disappearance, the efforts to recover her—alive or deceased—had expanded statewide, then nationwide. All developments pertaining to the search were relayed into an improvised headquarters named the "Rescue Sara Center" in New Hartford, New York. Thousands of missing persons posters were circulated across America and appeals and updates regarding Wood's abduction were broadcast upon 48 Hours and America's Most Wanted.

== Suspect's arrest ==
In 1996, a 45-year-old janitor named Lewis Stephen Lent Jr. of North Adams, Massachusetts, was formally charged with Wood's abduction and murder. Lent had been arrested and convicted of attempting to abduct a 12-year-old girl named Rebecca Savarese at gunpoint in Pittsfield, Massachusetts, on January 7, 1994. This attempted abduction failed when the child feigned a severe asthma attack as he attempted to drag her by her backpack into his pickup truck, allowing her to free her arms from the straps of the bag and flee.

Savarese's attempted abduction was observed by an eyewitness who followed Lent's vehicle from a discreet distance until he noted his license plate number, which he relayed to the police. A search of the kidnap vehicle revealed duct tape, a knife, a gun, a pair of child's sunglasses, and candy; a search of Lent's van revealed Savarese's backpack and a loaded revolver.

=== House search ===
A search of Lent's North Adams home revealed an intricate private chamber in the process of construction beneath the house which Lent confessed he was constructing for the sole purpose of restraining and abusing future victims—primarily female—prior to their murder. He further elaborated his ideal intended victims would be between the ages of twelve and seventeen, with long hair and "just beginning to develop" physically and whom he could "take out" from this area of confinement whenever he desired to abuse. This chamber was still incomplete, thus meaning that any victims he successfully kidnapped in the meantime would be used for "quickies" before their murder.

Lent was sentenced to serve a term of between seventeen and twenty years' imprisonment for Savarese's attempted abduction, to be served at MCI Walpole, on January 13, 1995.

== Confessions ==
Shortly after Lent's arrest for Savarese's attempted abduction, investigators in New York reviewed a disseminated teletype of the offense—the victim profile and general circumstances of which closely matched Wood's abduction. He was interrogated shortly after his arrest and soon confessed to Wood's rape and murder in addition to the October 22, 1990, abduction and murder of a 12-year-old Pittsfield, Massachusetts, boy named James Joseph Bernardo.

=== James Bernardo ===
Lent claimed to have encountered Bernardo outside the movie theater where he worked as a janitor. He had offered the boy $5 to move chairs in the theater, which Bernardo accepted. Inside the theater, he bound Bernardo's hands behind his back at knifepoint, then drove him to his home, where the child was bound by his wrists and ankles to Lent's bed. The following morning, he drove the blindfolded boy to an area of woodland in Newfield, New York, where he strangled him to death with a section of rope. Bernardo's body was found by hunters several weeks after his abduction. The duct tape placed over the boy's mouth and across his eyes was a match to that discovered in Lent's vehicle at the time of his arrest, thus substantiating Lent's confession.

=== Sara Wood ===
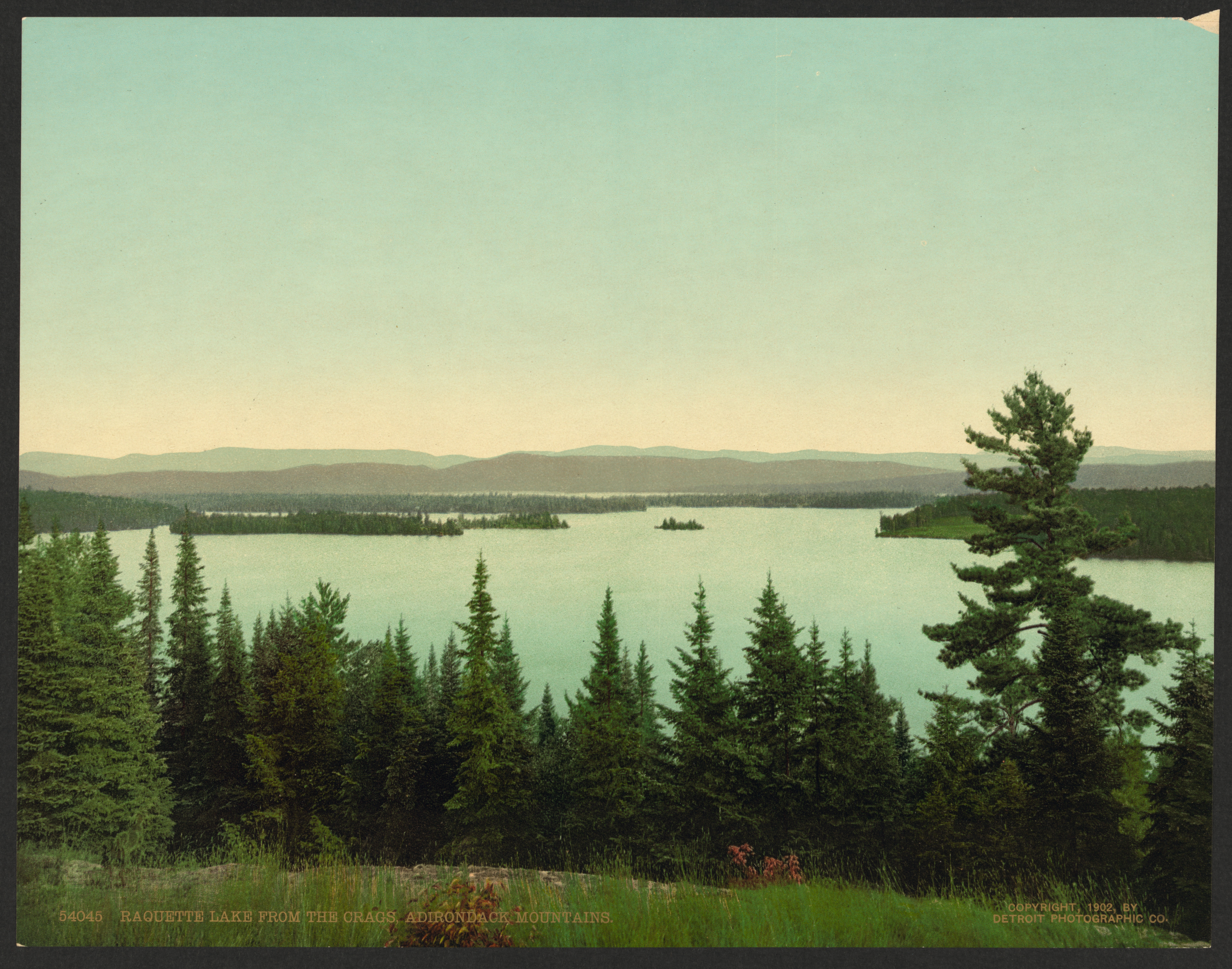
Raquette Lake, viewed from the Adirondack Mountains. Lent claimed to have buried Wood's body close to this lake shortly after her abduction and murder.

Lent confessed to encountering Wood walking alongside her bicycle upon Hacadam Road. He claimed to have dragged her into his van at knifepoint, bound her hands and driven to the Adirondack Mountains where he sexually assaulted her before bludgeoning her with a tree branch as the child begged for her life. He had then buried her body in a shallow grave within a clearing near Raquette Lake, at a location in or near the town of Inlet, without ensuring she was dead as opposed to simply unconscious before he had buried her, adding he could still see his van from the location where he buried Wood. He agreed to draw a map of the location of her burial to assist investigators in the recovery of her body.

==== Search efforts ====
An extensive search of the area around Raquette Lake was mounted to locate Wood's body; the search lasted over two weeks and involved over 100 state troopers, the New York State Department of Environmental Conservation Police, numerous civilian volunteers, and over fifty personnel from Griffiss Air Force Base. Search and rescue dogs and heavy equipment were also used in the search and many other civilians prepared meals with food donated by local businesses and the public for the searchers; others—including Wood's father—transported sandwiches, beverages and excavation equipment from storage facilities to the search locations. These extensive efforts ultimately proved fruitless.

Lent subsequently claimed that Wood had not actually been buried at a location close to Raquette Lake, although he refused to disclose the actual whereabouts of her remains—claiming that he had buried another victim's body close to hers which he did not want to be found.

== Murder convictions ==
Lent was tried separately for both homicides. In June 1996, he pleaded guilty to Bernardo's abduction and murder; on October 16, he received a sentence of life in prison without the possibility of parole. At his formal sentencing for Bernardo's murder, he informed his attorney that he also wished to plead guilty to Wood's murder; however, reportedly upon seeing Wood's parents in the courtroom at this hearing, he refused to provide any further details pertaining to her actual whereabouts.

Nine days after pleading guilty to Bernardo's murder, on October 25, 1996, Lent pleaded guilty to Wood's abduction, rape and murder. Although Wood's family were not present in the courtroom on this occasion, he again refused to provide any additional information regarding the child's whereabouts.

Though Lent later recanted his confession to Wood's abduction and murder, he was convicted of her second-degree murder and formally sentenced to a concurrent term of 25 years to life in prison by Judge Patrick Kirk on April 11, 1997. His sentencing was delayed by two months at the request of Wood's parents in the hope he might be persuaded to finally reveal the location of their daughter's body.

In the months immediately prior to his sentencing, Lent refused a plea bargain offer from Herkimer County District Attorney Michael Daley whereby he would not serve his life sentence inside a state prison if he revealed the location of Wood's body. He also refused final, personal pleas from the Wood family to reveal her whereabouts throughout the sentencing phase of his trial. These final pleas from the family included recitations of Bible verses urging him to repent for his past deeds.

You may think you have power over us because you know where Sara's body is;... we know where Sara's soul is, so therefore you have no power over us.

— Dusty Wood, imploring Lent to reveal the location of Sara's body prior to his sentencing for her abduction and murder. April 1997.

A final request from Judge Kirk to Lent to reveal the location of her body immediately prior to his imposing sentence was also ignored, prompting the judge to remark he would have had no hesitation in imposing the death penalty upon Lent had he the legal option to do so in this case.

== Imprisonment ==
Lent is currently incarcerated in Pittsfield, Massachusetts. Investigators have not discounted future visits with him to discuss where Wood is actually buried, although Michael Daley has stated he believes Lent has taunted Wood's family and investigators alike by refusing to reveal her burial location, stating in 2013: "I believe that [he] has misled us intentionally in a number of different areas, but he has given us all the information we need to find the location; he just hasn't given us the final piece – and he is challenging us to find that ourselves."

=== Third murder confession ===
In 2013, Lent confessed to the November 6, 1992, abduction and murder of 16-year-old James Donald Lusher, a mentally disabled teenager who disappeared while riding his mountain bike to his grandmother's home in Blandford, Massachusetts. He agreed to confess to this murder in exchange for his not being prosecuted. According to Lent's confession, Lusher was abducted close to his Westfield, Massachusetts, home and his body discarded in the town of Becket. Lusher's bike was discovered several days after his disappearance, although his remains have also never been recovered.

Lent is also considered a suspect in the 1986 disappearance of Tammie Anne McCormick, a 13-year-old Saratoga Springs Junior High School student. McCormick was last seen alive by her older sister, whom she informed of her intentions to hitchhike to school. She never arrived at her destination. Although McCormick had informed school friends of her intentions to run away to Florida prior to her disappearance, she did not take any of her personal belongings. Foul play is suspected in her case, with Arthur Mason Slaybaugh also named as a prime suspect.

We have sent out over ten-and-a-half million posters of missing children, all throughout the United States, and represented about eleven thousand missing children ... out of that eleven thousand, we've helped to recover over seventy-five hundred.

— Wendy Fical, National Center For Missing and Exploited Children Program Director, reciting statistics detailing the efforts and success of the New York branch of the NCMEC. 2018.

== Aftermath ==
Following Wood's disappearance, her family founded the Sara Anne Wood Rescue Center; this center later amalgamated into the Mohawk Valley branch of the National Center for Missing & Exploited Children (NCMEC) and remains operational. This facility is located in Utica, New York, specializes in the preparation and distribution of missing child posters, and remains the only geographically targeted missing child poster distribution center in the United States. In 2017 alone, the efforts of this branch resulted in the safe recovery of 399 children nationwide.

On National Missing Children's Day 1995, seven cyclists—including Wood's father and 19-year-old brother—organized a symbolic bicycle ride from Utica to Washington, D.C. to raise awareness of the Sara Anne Wood Rescue Center, and missing children in general. Two years later, inspired by this first symbolic bicycle ride, 43 cyclists replicated the event. These symbolic bike rides have since become annual events at locations in and around upstate New York and are known as the "Ride for Missing Children", which honors the ongoing commitments of the Sara Anne Wood Rescue Center and law enforcement to raise awareness of the plight of missing children and their families in addition to teaching the importance of child safety education to prevent child abduction and sexual exploitation. All funds raised are given to the National Center For Missing & Exploited Children, and each annual bike ride sees thousands of attendees.

Each participant cyclist at this one-day ride wears a jersey of Wood's favorite colors of teal and pink, with additional colors of white to represent all missing children nationwide, and purple as a salute to law enforcement personnel in general. Participants stop at schools en route to deliver messages of safety and awareness and each is asked to raise a minimum of $300 for the cause. Some schools release balloons with affixed paper messages instructing upon how to keep children safe at the conclusion of the participant cyclists' visit, and many participants wear a pin or brooch naming and/or depicting the child he or she is participating in honor of. The inscription upon the backs of many of these cyclists reads: "Making our children safer, one child at a time." (Note: Following restrictions imposed due to the COVID-19 pandemic, other methods of participating in the "Ride for Missing Children" began in 2020. These events—known as "Miles for Hope"—allow participants to accrue miles walked, swam, or ran for the same cause without physically participating in the bike race and are hosted from September 1 to September 30.)

In the decade following Wood's abduction, annual reports of child abduction in New York decreased by thirty percent.

Shortly after Wood's disappearance, a tree was planted in her honor at Sauquoit Valley Middle School and a ribbon-shaped memorial installed in the grounds of the school. A plaque was later installed by her classmates in front of the tree in 1999—the year Wood would have graduated from high school.

In 2015, one of her elementary sixth-grade school teachers, Christine Kisiel, would reflect on her former pupil and the enduring impact of her disappearance when referencing the annual "Ride for Missing Children" events: "When I was watching the bikers, I thought, 'Oh, my God, this all started with [Sara]' ... I can still see her sitting in my classroom. She was not a morning person and her hair was all in disarray. God, she was so cute! I can see her like it was yesterday."

Despite numerous searches having been conducted to locate her remains, as of 2026, Wood's body remains undiscovered. Her family has stated that they continue to hope her body will be found in order that she can be given a Christian burial close to her relatives.

== See also ==
- Amber alert
- Child abduction
- Cold case
- List of kidnappings (1990–1999)
- List of solved missing person cases (1990s)
- National Center for Missing & Exploited Children
- The Doe Network
