= 1858 Utica train wreck =

1858 train wreck in New York

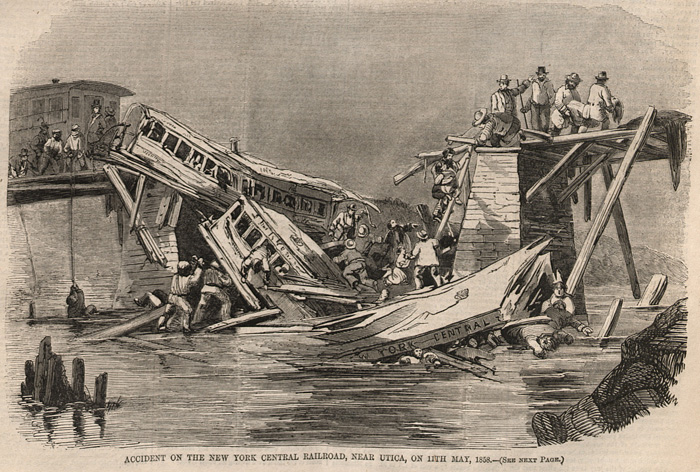
- Engraving of the accident in Frank Leslie's Illustrated Magazine

Details
- Date: May 11, 1858; 168 years ago
- Location: Utica, New York
- Coordinates: 43°07′12″N 75°16′48″W
- Operator: New York Central Railroad
- Incident type: Bridge collapse
- Cause: Poor quality of materials

Statistics
- Trains: 2
- Deaths: 9
- Injured: 55

The 1858 Utica train wreck was a rail disaster that occurred as the result of a bridge collapse. Nine passengers were killed as a result of the wreck.

== Incident ==
On May 11, 1858, an eastbound Cincinnati express passenger train was crossing a wooden bridge over the Sauquoit Creek in Utica, New York. At this same time, a westbound freight train was also crossing this bridge on the opposite line. The freight train had barely made it past the creek when the bridge gave way and collapsed. Several of the passenger cars shattered as they stacked upon each other. Nine were killed and 55 were injured. The injuries were described in Frank Leslie's Illustrated Newspaper:

"Among the wounded, S. S. Horton of Birminghamton had his throat cut ear to ear, as completely as though it had been done with a knife... Mrs. Broderick was completely scalped..."

Personal accounts from survivors stated that the bridge collapse was a result of poor wood quality. These personal accounts also reveal that the New York Central Rail Company made out of court settlements, with some receiving $2,000 (equivalent to around $79,000 today).
