= Imputation of sin =

Calvinist theology on the effect of Adam's sin

In Reformed theology, the imputation of sin is the crediting of Adam's sin to the account of every individual human being. Under the framework of covenant theology, Adam is considered as a "federal head" or representative of all of his progeny. His sinful act of eating the fruit from the tree of the knowledge of good and evil which was forbidden by God had consequences for all humanity. This is explained as the sin being imputed, or accounted, to individual humans. A person that has sin imputed to them becomes guilty of transgression before God for being in violation to his laws and is subject to his punishments in the life hereafter.

Several theories have been proposed by Reformed theologians to explain how Adam's sin is transmitted to others. The "immediate imputation" view holds that when Adam sinned, all of humanity became sinful simply by that act, without further consideration. Under the "mediate imputation" view (due to Joshua Placaeus), humans inherited a proclivity to sin because of Adam's act. In recent years, theologians have begun to explain the transmission of original sin by socialization and character deformation rather than imputation.
