= La Mott W. Rhodes =

American lawyer and politician from Troy, New York

La Mott W. Rhodes (February 21, 1843 – March 1, 1890) was an American lawyer and politician from Troy, New York.

== Life ==
Rhodes was born on February 21, 1843, at the Rhodes family homestead in Paris, New York. His father was Samuel B. Rhodes.

Rhodes attended the West Winfield Academy and the Fort Edward Institute. He prepared for college under Professor Harrison E. Webster of Union College, and in 1862 he entered Union College. He graduated from there in 1866, after which he began studying law in the office of John L. Flagg of Troy. When he was admitted to the bar, he formed a law partnership with Judge Romeyn that lasted until Romeyn's death in 1871. He then formed a partnership with Harvey J. King known as King & Rhodes that lasted until Rhodes retired for health reasons.

Rhodes was appointed School Commissioner for Troy by Mayor Chamberlain when the Board was organized. The appointment was for two years, after which he was elected School Commissioner for three years, two of which were spent serving as president of the Board. He unsuccessfully ran as the Democratic candidate for District Attorney of Rensselaer County in 1875 and 1878. In 1879, he was elected to the New York State Assembly as a Democrat, representing the Rensselaer County 1st District. He served in the Assembly in 1880. He was elected District Attorney in 1881 and was reelected in 1884, serving a total of six years in that office.

Rhodes was a Baptist. He was a member of the New York State Bar Association Committee on Legal Biography and a trustee of Union College and Troy Academy. In 1867, he married Celia A. Verbeck of Saratoga. They had a son.

Rhodes died in St. Helena, California, where he went for health reasons, on March 1, 1890. His body was originally buried in the family plot in Clayville, but when it was discovered his will had a provision for a burial plot and monument at Oakwood Cemetery in Troy he was disinterred from the Clayville cemetery and buried there instead.

New York State Assembly
Preceded by Francis N. Mann Jr.	New York State Assembly; Rensselaer County, 1st District; 1880	Succeeded by Charles E. Patterson
