= Edward Tompkins =

American lawyer

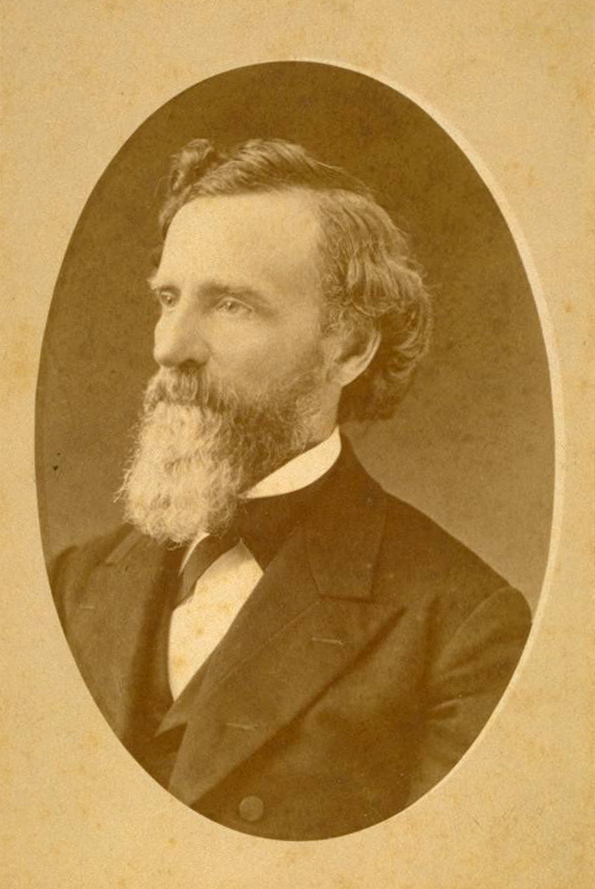
- Born: May 8, 1815; Paris, New York
- Died: November 14, 1872 (aged 57); Oakland, California
- Education: Union College (1831): Hamilton College
- Known for: Endowing a chair at the University of California
- Spouse(s): Mary Cook (1837–?); Sarah Haight (1861–)
- Children: Elizabeth Knight Tompkins
- Parent(s): Gilbert Tompkins and Dorothy Stanton

Edward Tompkins (1815–1872) was an American lawyer. He is best known for endowing a chair at the University of California where he had been elected to the board of regents. (Note: The term "honorary regent" refers to the fact Tompkins was elected to the board rather than appointed by the governor, not to his function as a regent.)

== Background ==
Tompkins was born in 1815 in rural Paris Hill, New York. Tompkins enrolled in Union College in 1831 and joined Sigma Phi. Tompkins graduated, earned a law degree at Hamilton College, and practiced law in Binghamton, New York as a partner to Daniel S. Dickinson. Tompkins married a Quaker woman, Mary Cook, from Bridgeport, Connecticut. She died several years later. Tompkins moved to San Francisco, California in 1859 where he continued as a lawyer. In 1861 Tompkins married a sister of Henry Huntly Haight named Sarah, a woman 20 years Tompkins's junior. They established residence on the shores of Lake Merritt in Oakland. Tompkins was elected in 1869 to represent Alameda County in the California State Senate. In 1870 Tompkins, a self-described Constitutional Democrat, spoke in favor of ratification of the 15th Amendment and voted against a California Senate resolution opposing California's proposed ratification.

It is a praiseworthy forethought on the part of one of the Regents which has led him to provide among us for the study of Chinese and Japanese. His presence here cannot restrain me from rendering a public tribute of gratitude for this wise and timely munificence. Let us hope that his generous purposes will, ere long, be realized.

— Daniel Coit Gilman

As a state senator Tompkins argued for the creation of the University of California as recommended by the previous governor, Frederick Low. The charter creating the university (then only an agricultural school) passed on March 23, 1868 and Tompkins was elected to a four-year term on the Board of Regents of the University of California later that same year. Upon Tompkins's death in 1872, his position on the board of regents was filled by his brother-in-law, former Governor Haight. Some of Tompkins's letters are archived with papers of his relatives at Bancroft Library.

=== Louis Agassiz Chair ===
Tompkins endowed the school's chair of Oriental Languages and Literature named for Louis Agassiz on September 18, 1872 only months before Tompkins died. His initial gift of 47 acres (0.19 km^{2}), which sold for US$50,000 (equivalent to $1,343,750 in 2025), was evaluated on June 30, 2008 at more than US$5,700,000. Tompkins's interest in Oriental studies grew out of his anticipation of expanded trans-Pacific commerce. Tompkins said that he felt "deeply the humiliation" of seeing Asian students go to the East Coast "in search of that intellectual hospitality that we are not yet enlightened enough to extend to them."
