= Vatican.va =

Official website of the Holy See

- Coat of arms of the Holy See, the favicon of the website

- Screenshot Screenshot of home page on 28 May 2025
- Website type: Religion
- Available in: Arabic; Chinese; English; French; German; Italian; Latin; Portuguese; Spanish
- Country of origin: Vatican City
- Website: www.vatican.va
- Launched: 25 December 1995

Vatican.va is the official website of the Holy See, launched on 25 December 1995. The website serves as the online access point for the papacy and hosts official documents. Conceived by Franciscan sister Judith Zoebelein, Archbishop John Patrick Foley, and the press office director Joaquín Navarro-Valls, Vatican.va has been maintained and developed by the Pontifical Council for Social Communications (PCSC) since its inception.

== Description ==
Vatican.va is managed by the PCSC, which regularly updates the website's layout and contents to keep up with the latest technology. The website, which serves "as the access point for information about the pope and the Curial offices," features full texts of official documents of the Holy See, including letters, encyclicals, constitutions, and exhortations. The website is provided in nine languages: English, French, German, Portuguese, Spanish, Italian, Latin, Chinese, and Arabic, although not all documents on the website are fully translated. The website also hosts the entire text of the Nova Vulgata, the Church's current authorized Latin translation of the Bible. The current website has been updated to prominently display a photo of Pope Leo XIV, as well as links to acquiring tickets and daily news.

== History ==
As the Roman Curia began adopting computers and other offline technology in the late 1980s, the idea for establishing an Intranet of ecclesiastical documents took hold. Led by the PCSC, the initial plan was to have Bayard Presse run a database first in Latin America called La Red Informática de la Iglesia en América Latina (RIIAL) and then spread to other countries with content provided in their respective languages. However the idea was scrapped due to high costs and the cheaper prospect of the then-emerging Internet. Pope John Paul II himself issued "The Christian Message in a Computer Culture" in 1990, the first Papal document on the role of computer technology, which gave guidance on the purpose of digital communication by the Church. Archbishop John Patrick Foley, appointed president of the PCSC by the pope in 1984, would thus develop the Vatican website on the remains of RIIAL and with the pope's message in mind. Foley would also see to the granting of the .va top-level domain in September 1995, which was to be used on all official URLs of the Holy See.

In 1991, Cardinal Rosalio Castillo Lara enlisted American Franciscan sister Judith Zoebelein to direct computer installations in the Vatican. Zoebelein, along with Foley and press office director Joaquín Navarro-Valls formulated the idea for the Vatican website in 1994. Despite initial hesitance among some key members of the Vatican, Navarro-Valls successfully pitched the idea of a Vatican website to the pope. Vatican.va was thereafter launched on Christmas Day, 1995. The site was very simple in the beginning with only an email address, an image of John Paul II, and the text of his Urbi et Orbi of that Christmas. Nevertheless, it attracted at least 300,000 people from 70 countries in its first 48 hours. It is difficult to tell the subsequent history of the website between its launch and its revamp in March 1997, the latter date being the first version of the website archived by the Wayback Machine on 30 January 1998. During the final year of this period, the website was temporarily suspended in preparation of the major revamp released on 27 March 1997. In this new revision, the website would now include more than 1200 texts by Popes Paul VI, John Paul I and John Paul II in six languages. 200 email addresses of the .va domain were also introduced for communication with and within the Holy See. The background texture of the website resembled parchment paper, "which was chosen perhaps to symbolize the Church's ancient history."

From 2000 to 2005, Vatican.va was thoroughly updated to include new menus, tens of thousands of documents, and a search engine, in addition to at least 1,000 email addresses associated with the website by late 2004. The website in 2001 had sections for "Holy Father, the Roman Curia, News Services, the Library and Secret Archives, the Vatican City State, the Vatican Museums, and the Archive." Under Pope Benedict XVI, who succeeded John Paul II in 2005, the website was made available in Latin in 2008 as a part of Benedict's promotion of the language. By 2014, the website had been again updated with new features, among them a Twitter feed of the new pope, Francis. A short while after the inauguration of Pope Leo XIV in May 2025, the website was heavily redesigned, with Molly Olmstead of Slate describing the update thus: "Gone are the textured wallpaper and random shadow effects, the imprecisely placed text boxes, and the awkwardly tacked-on Twitter icon that led nowhere. Tragically, the new website has tasteful sky blues, a high-resolution photo of the new pope, and an overall consistency of design and pleasing simplicity that doesn’t scream Windows 95."

== Reception ==
In his 2006 study, Todd S. Frobish expresses some concern that the Vatican may not fully "appreciate" the capacity of the website to attract new followers, writing "[t]he site could have done more here to persuade users to see the site not as the total experience of Catholicism, but as a beginning." The sociologist of religion Andrew P. Lynch assessed in 2015 that the website overall reflected the structure of the Church itself, emphasizing top-down messaging rather than dialogue between clergy and laity. Nonetheless, he determined that the website does still attest to the Church's willingness to engage with its members in the modern world.
