= George Gage (politician) =

American politician

- Born: August 30, 1813; Litchfield, New York, U.S.
- Died: December 19, 1899 (aged 86); McHenry, Illinois, U.S.
- Occupation: Politician
- Known for: Bringing the railroad to the city of McHenry as well as founding Gagetown.

George Gage (1813-1899) was a politician from McHenry County, Illinois he a member of the state legislature from 1850 until 1852 and was the first state senator from the county and served from 1854 until 1858. He was instrumental in bringing the rail road to the city of McHenry.
