= Arthur Cushman McGiffert =

American theologian

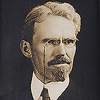
Arthur Cushman McGiffert

Arthur Cushman McGiffert (March 4, 1861 – February 25, 1933), American theologian, was born in Sauquoit, New York, the son of a Presbyterian minister of Scots-Irish descent.

== Biography ==
He graduated at Western Reserve College in 1882 and at Union Theological Seminary in 1885, studied in Germany (especially under Harnack) in 1885–1887, and in Italy and France in 1888, and in that year received the degree of doctor of philosophy at Marburg. He was instructor (1888-1890) and professor (1890-1893) of church history at Lane Theological Seminary, and in 1893 became Washburn professor of church history in Union theological seminary, succeeding Philip Schaff. He became the 8th president of Union Seminary in 1917

He died in Dobbs Ferry, New York, on February 25, 1933, at the age of 71.

== Career ==
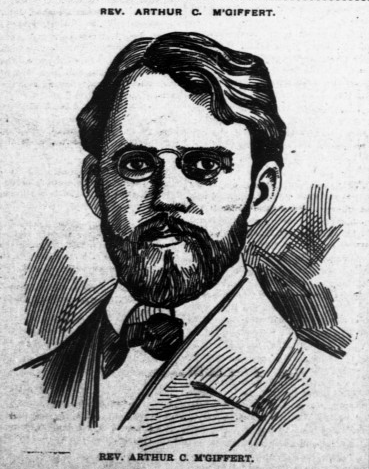
Arthur McGiffert in The Broad Ax on May 14, 1900

His published work, except occasional critical studies in philosophy, dealt with church history and the history of dogma. His best known publication is a History of Christianity in the Apostolic Age (1897). This book, which sustains critical historical eminence to this day, by its independent criticism and departures from traditionalism, aroused the opposition of the General Assembly of the Presbyterian Church; though the charges brought against McGiffert were dismissed by the Presbytery of New York, to which they had been referred, a trial for heresy seemed inevitable, and McGiffert, in 1900, retired from the Presbyterian ministry and retained his credentialed status by eager recognition from a Congregational Church. Likewise he retained his distinguished position at Union Theological Seminary.

A History of Christian Thought constituted a two volume work (1932, 1933) which established an American standard in theological studies and is still cited regularly by scholars. Among his other publications are: A Dialogue between a Christian and a Jew (1888); a translation (with introduction and notes) of Eusebius's Church History (1890; part of Philip Schaff's Nicene and Post-Nicene Fathers series); and The Apostle's Creed (1902), in which he attempted to prove that the old Roman creed was formulated as a protest against the dualism of Marcion and his denial of the reality of Jesus's life on earth.

== Family ==
McGiffert was married with three children; his son, Arthur Jr., was an author and professor of Christian Theology at the Chicago Theological Seminary.

== Works ==
- A Dialogue between a Christian and a Jew (1888)
- Eusebius: Church History, Life of Constantine the Great, etc. [Translated by A.C. McGiffert, and others.] (1890)
- Primitive and Catholic Christianity: an address (1893)
- A History of Christianity in the Apostolic Age (1897)
- The Apostles' Creed: its origin, its purpose, and its historical interpretation: a lecture, with critical notes (1902)
- Protestant Thought before Kant (1909)
- Modernism and Catholicism (1910)
- Martin Luther and His Work (1911)
- The Rise of Modern Religious Ideas (1912)
- The God of the Early Christians (1924)
- A History of Christian Thought 2 Volumes (1932, 1933)
