= Clayville, New York =

- Village
- Location in Oneida County and the state of New York.
- Coordinates: 42°58′29″N 75°14′56″W
- Country: United States
- State: New York
- County: Oneida
- Town: Paris

Area
  - Total: 0.44 sq mi (1.15 km^{2})
  - Land: 0.44 sq mi (1.14 km^{2})
  - Water: 0.0039 sq mi (0.01 km^{2})
- Elevation: 984 ft (300 m)

Population (2020)
  - Total: 339
  - Density: 772.0/sq mi (298.06/km^{2})
- Time zone: UTC-5 (Eastern (EST))
  - Summer (DST): UTC-4 (EDT)
- ZIP Codes: 13322 (Clayville); 13456 (Sauquoit)
- Area code: 315
- FIPS code: 36-16111
- GNIS feature ID: 2391610
- Website: www.clayville.net

Clayville is a village in Oneida County, New York, United States. The population was 339 at the 2020 census.

The village of Clayville (formerly called Paris Furnace) is inside the town of Paris.

== History ==
Clayville was incorporated in 1887 and was named in honor of Henry Clay. Iron foundries and machine shops were an important activity here by the 1850s.

== Businesses ==
Businesses located in this village include the John DePerno Bail Agency, Sauquoit Valley Friends & Neighbors, The Main Street Tavern, D H Smith Company Inc., and Pratt & Whitney- HMI Metal Powders.

== Geography ==
According to the United States Census Bureau, the village has a total area of 0.5 square miles (1.3 km^{2}), of which 0.5 square miles (1.3 km^{2}) is land and 2.13% is water.

== Demographics ==
Historical population
Census	Pop.	Note	%±
1870	944		—
1880	847		−10.3%
1890	843		−0.5%
1900	568		−32.6%
1910	649		14.3%
1920	990		52.5%
1930	801		−19.1%
1940	711		−11.2%
1950	719		1.1%
1960	686		−4.6%
1970	535		−22.0%
1980	478		−10.7%
1990	463		−3.1%
2000	445		−3.9%
2010	350		−21.3%
2020	339		−3.1%
U.S. Decennial Census

At the 2000 census there were 445 people in 168 households, including 109 families, in the village. The population density was 970.7 inhabitants per square mile (374.8/km^{2}). There were 200 housing units at an average density of 436.3 per square mile (168.5/km^{2}). The racial makeup of the village was 98.43% White, 0.45% African American, 0.22% Pacific Islander, and 0.90% from two or more races. Hispanic or Latino of any race were 0.22%.

Of the 168 households 38.1% had children under the age of 18 living with them, 47.6% were married couples living together, 11.3% had a female householder with no husband present, and 35.1% were non-families. 29.8% of households were one person and 11.3% were one person aged 65 or older. The average household size was 2.65 and the average family size was 3.37.

The age distribution was 29.9% under the age of 18, 8.5% from 18 to 24, 30.3% from 25 to 44, 20.7% from 45 to 64, and 10.6% 65 or older. The median age was 34 years. For every 100 females, there were 96.9 males. For every 100 females age 18 and over, there were 100.0 males.

The median household income was $32,054 and the median family income was $39,500. Males had a median income of $26,528 versus $18,250 for females. The per capita income for the village was $14,935. About 9.8% of families and 12.5% of the population were below the poverty line, including 17.6% of those under age 18 and 10.9% of those age 65 or over.
