= Sauquoit, New York =

- hamlet
- Location of Sauquoit in New York
- Coordinates: 42°56′45″N 75°15′36″W
- Country: United States
- State: New York
- County: Oneida
- Town: Paris
- Elevation: 866 ft (264 m)
- ZIP code: 13456
- Area codes: 315 and 680

Sauquoit is a hamlet in the Town of Paris, Oneida County, New York, United States. It is located on New York Route 8, approximately six miles or ten kilometers south of Utica and east of Paris village. It straddles Sauquoit Creek, a small Mohawk River tributary, and nestles in the Sauquoit Valley.

Sauquoit is the birthplace of Asa Gray, botanist; Michael O'Donoghue, humor writer and performer who worked on National Lampoon and Saturday Night Live; Arthur Cushman McGiffert, theologian; and Richard Mathy, reality contestant on season 4 of The Bachelorette. 12-year-old Sauquoit resident Sara Anne Wood disappeared in 1993.

The local high school is Sauquoit Valley Central School, which has held several cross-country state championships, including a stretch of three boys' state titles in four years (2001, 2002, 2004) and an undefeated dual meet streak from 1993 to 2005. The school has also had several individual cross country state champions.
