= Pierre Soubeyran =

Genevan-French engraver

Pierre Soubeyran (6 November 1709, Geneva, Republic of Geneva – 12 April 1775, Geneva, Republic of Geneva) was an 18th-century engraver, etcher and Encyclopédiste, mainly active in Paris.

== Biography ==
Pierre Soubeyran was the son of the locksmith Pierre Soubeyran, a Huguenot refugees from Sauve, Languedoc and his wife Pernette de Bourdeau.

He received his first graphic training by Daniel Gardelle (1679-1753) from Geneva, the brother of the painter and engraver Robert Gardelle. His protectors sent him in Paris to further training in 1730. Jean-Jacques Burlamaqui (1694-1748) encouraged him to train as etcher in Paris, where from 1742 to 1749 he was a member of the French Academy of Sciences. At times, he also received lessons by Georg Friedrich Schmidt.

In Paris, he acquired a solid reputation. Soubeyran soon became one of the most qualified engravers of his time. On 14 May 1748, he was appointed as Head of the Public Drawing School in Geneva, École de Dessein de Genève (later known as École Supérieure des Beaux-Arts, Genève).

Soubeyran wrote the article "Montre" for the Encyclopédie by Denis Diderot and d’Alembert.

Pierre Soubeyran is often mistaken with his cousin, Jean-Pierre Soubeyran (1708–1774), a miniaturist.

== Main works ==
His primary prints are:

- la Conversion de saint Bruno, after Le Sueur
- la Belle villageoise, by Boucher
- Portrait de Pierre le Grand, after Caravaggio
- Une jeune fille devant son miroir, by Natoire
- Six Paysages, by Lucas van Uden.
- Most boards of the Traité des pierres antiques, by Mariette, after Bouchardon
- Vignettes for the Hall of Mirrors of Versailles, by Massé

== Bibliography ==
- Ferdinand Hoefer: Nouvelle Biographie générale. t. 44, Firmin-Didot, Paris 1865, (p. 212–213)
- Danielle Buyssens: La carrière parisienne de Pierre Soubeyran, premier directeur de l'école publique de dessin de Genève. In Liber veritatis. 2007, (pp. 181–189)
- Danielle Buyssens: La question de l'art à Genève. 2008
