= Jean-Robert Chouet =

Genevan politician and physicist (1642–1731)

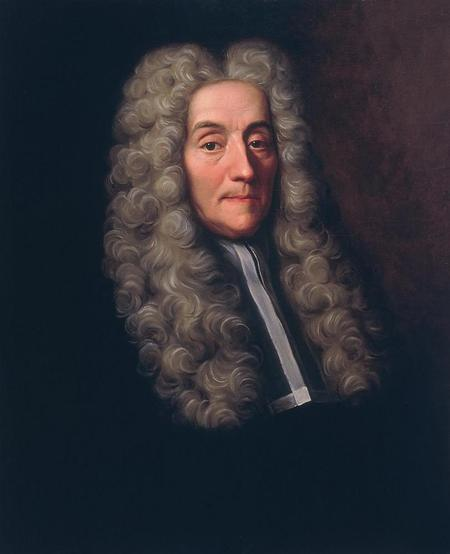
- Portrait by Robert Gardelle, ca. 1715. Oil on canvas, from the collection of the Bibliothèque de Genève.
- Born: 30 August 1642; Geneva, Republic of Geneva
- Died: 17 August 1731 (aged 88); Geneva, Republic of Geneva
- Education: Academy of Geneva
- Scientific career
- Fields: Physics
- Workplaces: Academy of Saumur, Academy of Geneva
- Doctoral advisor: Caspar Wyss
- Other academic advisors: David Derodon
- Notable students: Pierre Bayle, Nicolas Fatio de Duillier, Jean Leclerc

Jean-Robert Chouet (French: [ʃwɛ]; 30 September 1642 – 17 September 1731) was a physicist and political leader from the Republic of Geneva. He is chiefly remembered for introducing Cartesianism to the Academy of Geneva.

== Early life and education ==
Chouet studied philosophy at the Academy of Geneva from 1658 to 1661. In 1659, he wrote a dissertation entitled De motu ("On motion"), supervised by Caspar Wyss. In that work he critiqued the Artistotelian concept of motion, while still also rejecting Cartesianism. He then traveled to Nîmes to study philosophy under David Derodon, a partisan of the atomism of Pierre Gassendi. Under Derodon, Chouet defended in 1662 a thesis containing an exposition of the system of Tycho Brahe. Chouet then returned to Geneva where he studied Calvinist theology in 1662–64, without much enthusiasm.

=== Family ===
His father Pierre was a printer and librarian. His mother, Renée Tronchin, was the daughter of Théodore Tronchin (1582-1657) and sister of Louis Tronchin (1629-1705), both professors of theology. The Tronchins were one of the dominant families in the Council of Geneva and at the Academy of Geneva. Chouet married first Marie Favre, the daughter of treasurer-general Jean-Jacques Favre. He later married Suzanne Rigot, daughter of councillor Ami Rigot and widow of draper Louis Mallet.

== Academic career ==
In 1664, he was appointed professor of philosophy at the Academy of Saumur, where the influence of René Descartes was strong. Chouet's teaching gradually became Cartesian and was enriched by experimental demonstrations. In 1669, at the behest of Louis Tronchin he was called back to Geneva as professor of philosophy at the Academy. There he taught the Cartesian system and treated numerous theoretical questions in theses prepared with his students. The content of these theses in physics was close to the Cartesian explanations found in such works as Jacques Rohault's Traité de Physique (1671).

In Geneva, Chouet carried out experiments and published results on the action of snake venom, on the variation in a barometer's reading associated with changes in elevation, on the operation of a siphon, and on magnets. He served as rector of the Academy of Geneva from 1679 to 1681. Among Chouet's students were the astronomer and mathematician Nicolas Fatio de Duillier, as well as polygraphs Pierre Bayle and Jean Leclerc. Chouet's weekly experimental demonstrations attracted the interest of spectators from other Swiss cities.

== Political career ==
Chouet was elected to the Republic of Geneva's Council of Two Hundred in 1677. In 1686, he resigned from his professorship at the Academy of Geneva and took up a place in the Council of Twenty Five, a self-appointing executive body that exercised most of the actual power of government in the then-independent Geneva. Chouet was Secretary of State and Guardian of the Archives from 1689 to 1698. He served as Syndic in 1699, 1703 and 1707, and as First Syndic in 1711, 1715 and 1719. He also occupied the post of Scholarch from 1701 until 1727. He was among the patrician leaders who fought successfully against campaigns by Pierre Fatio and others to increase the powers of the elected Council of Two Hundred at the expense of the aristocratic Council of Twenty Five (the "Little Council").

Chouet played a key role in the educational reforms of the Academy of Geneva, introduced in 1701 and 1704 by the initiative of Jean-Alphonse Turrettini. He modernized the instruction within the Academy and helped to enlarge and organize the Bibliothèque de Genève, opening its collection to the general public.

== Sources ==
- Heyd, Michael (1983). Between orthodoxy and the Enlightenment: Jean-Robert Chouet and the introduction of Cartesian science in the Academy of Geneva. Boston, MA: Kluwer. ISBN 978-9-024-72508-3. OCLC 884262270.
