= François Fatio =

Genevan merchant and banker (1622–1704)

- Born: June 1622; Zurich, Old Swiss Confederacy
- Died: 14 April 1704 (aged 81); Geneva, Old Swiss Confederacy
- Occupations: Merchant, banker, entrepreneur
- Known for: Sugar trade monopoly in Geneva, plantation owner in Suriname
- Spouse: Marie Franconis
- Children: 24, including Pierre Fatio
- Parent: Paul Fatio

François Fatio (June 1622 – 14 April 1704) was a Genevan merchant, banker, and entrepreneur who served as a member of the Council of Two Hundred and the Council of Sixty of Geneva. He was a Protestant plantation owner of an enslaved-labor sugar plantation in Suriname.

== Early life and family ==
François Fatio came from a Protestant family originally from Valtellina who had taken refuge in Switzerland. He was the son of Paul Fatio, a silk merchant. He completed classical studies in Lausanne and Basel. In 1647, he married Marie Franconis, daughter of Guillaume Franconis, a wealthy Genevan merchant who was a member of the Council of Two Hundred (1658) and auditor (1640), and Jaquema Lullin. The couple had 24 children, of whom 13 died in infancy, including Pierre Fatio. This marriage opened the doors to both business opportunities and the city of Geneva for François Fatio, who immediately acquired bourgeoisie status.

== Political career ==
Fatio served as a member of the Council of Two Hundred from 1658 and the Council of Sixty from 1680. He also served as deacon of the Italian Bourse in 1669 and purchased the seigneury of Bonvillars in 1675.

== Business activities ==
Sometimes described as a "capitalist" (notably by historian Anne-Marie Piuz), François Fatio was a highly active entrepreneur. As a trusted agent of France in Geneva, he successfully conducted commercial, manufacturing, real estate, and banking activities simultaneously. Constantly expanding his business interests, he combined trade (cereals, cheeses, salt, precious metals, silver, lead) with industry (in Languedoc and Franche-Comté), rapidly amassing a considerable fortune.

=== Colonial trade ===
Fatio is known for promoting the distribution of colonial goods (sugar, coffee, tobacco) in Geneva and Switzerland, transported from the port of Marseille. He established himself in this trade through his integration into French international trading circles, which allowed him to monopolize the sale of sugar in Geneva during the 1680s. Beginning in 1693, he attempted to challenge Amsterdam, which then controlled the distribution of this product in Europe, by financing a short-lived refinery in Plainpalais (closed in 1700).

=== Suriname plantation ===
In 1693, in partnership with Jean Tourton, a Huguenot banker of Lyon origin established in Amsterdam, his banking house François Fatio & fils purchased an enslaved-labor plantation in the Dutch colony of Suriname for 10,000 écus. This was the Knopomonbo sugar plantation, located along a tributary of the Commewijne River, of which Fatio owned three-quarters and Tourton the remaining quarter. To date, neither its area, the number of enslaved people who worked there, nor its profitability is known. Although he is sometimes credited with owning several plantations in present-day Suriname, it appears that Fatio only held co-ownership of Knopomonbo, which he transferred to his son Jean-Baptiste Fatio in 1699.

François Fatio and Tourton were absentee owners. To manage their property, they hired carpenters in Geneva to build and maintain sugar cane presses, a pharmacist and surgeons to care for the enslaved people, and possibly an administrator. Their recruitment was carried out in Geneva by Fatio and their transport to Suriname was organized in Amsterdam by Tourton. Once on site, the employees were fed, housed, and received a salary paid every six months.

The ownership of an enslaved-labor plantation represented only a tiny part of the business conducted by Fatio. He likely acquired it by purchasing bonds issued by Amsterdam trading houses. Bondholders could become owners of all or part of one or more plantations, received an annual income, and the repayment of their initial investment after a determined period. This was a flexible formula likely to appeal to the "capitalist" Fatio, whose investments were extremely diverse and scattered.

== Death and legacy ==
By testament, François Fatio made several important bequests to the hospitals of Geneva and Vevey and to the three charitable purses of Geneva.

== Bibliography ==
- Lüthy, Herbert: La banque protestante en France, de la révocation de l'Edit de Nantes à la Révolution, vol. 1, 1959, pp. 44-45.
- Piuz, Anne-Marie: A Genève et autour de Genève aux XVIIe et XVIIIe siècles. Etudes d'histoire économique, 1985, pp. 184-205.
- Streckeisen, Sylvie: "La place de Genève dans le commerce avec les Amériques aux XVIIe et XVIIIe siècles", in: Savary, Claude; Labarthe, Gilles (ed.): Mémoires d'esclaves, 1997, pp. 36-39 (exhibition catalogue).
