= Carla-Bayle =

Commune in Occitanie, France

- Commune
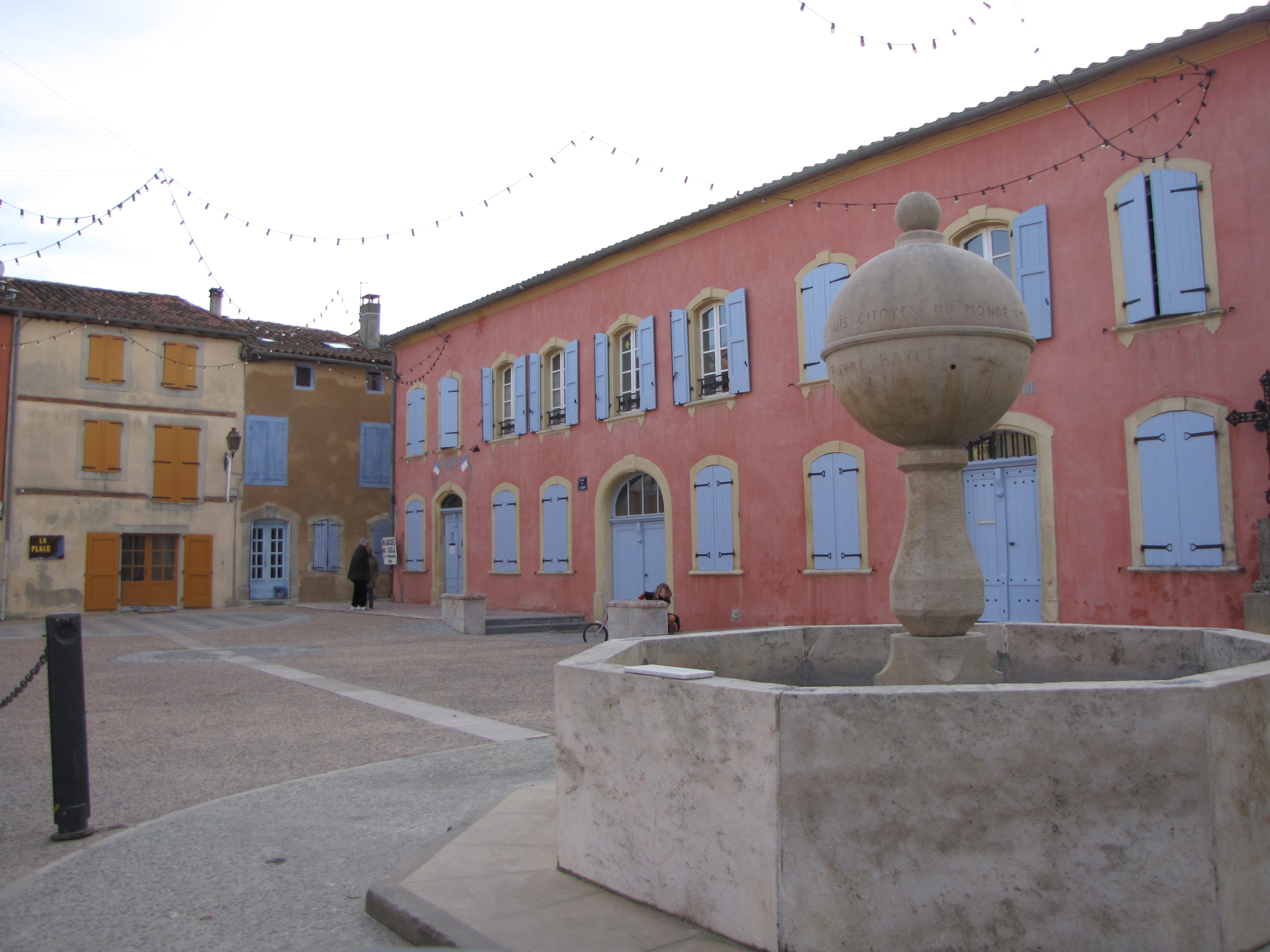
- Town hall

- Coat of arms
- Location of Carla-Bayle
- Location within France Location within Occitanie
- Coordinates: 43°09′05″N 1°23′39″E
- Country: France
- Region: Occitania
- Department: Ariège
- Arrondissement: Saint-Girons
- Canton: Arize-Lèze

Government
  - Mayor (2023–2026): Jean-François Sans
- Area^{1}: 35.52 km^{2} (13.71 sq mi)
- Elevation: 396 m (1,299 ft)
- Highest elevation: 411 m (1,348 ft)
- Lowest elevation: 236 m (774 ft)
- Population (2023): 787
  - Density: 22.2/km^{2} (57.4/sq mi)
- Time zone: UTC+01:00 (CET)
  - Summer (DST): UTC+02:00 (CEST)
- INSEE/Postal code: 09079 /09130
- ^{1} French Land Register data, which excludes lakes, ponds, glaciers > 1 km^{2} (0.386 sq mi or 247 acres) and river estuaries.

Carla-Bayle is a commune in the department of Ariège in southwestern France. It was the birthplace of Pierre Bayle (1647–1706), a Protestant philosopher and writer known for his works on religious toleration and his early encyclopedia.

== History ==
Originally named Carla-le-Comte, the commune became a center of Protestant Huguenot activity in the 16th century before the government suppressed it. Protestant philosopher and writer Pierre Bayle was born there, and was taught in his early years by his father, a Protestant minister. He briefly converted to Catholicism, before reverting to the Protestant Reform faith. His rejection of Catholicism led to his need to leave France. Later the government oppressed Protestants, who remained the majority in Carla. A Protestant stronghold, it was besieged by the royal army and its walls and chateau demolished.

During the revolution the commune was renamed Carla-le-Peuple. After the monarchy was restored it was renamed Carla-Bayle in honor of Pierre Bayle. Bayle's childhood home is now a museum and the town is home to many galleries and a number of artists.

== Population ==
Historical population
Year	Pop.	±% p.a.
1968	602	—
1975	538	−1.59%
1982	469	−1.94%
1990	578	+2.65%
1999	645	+1.23%
2007	736	+1.66%
2012	782	+1.22%
2017	780	−0.05%
2023	787	+0.15%
Source: INSEE

== See also ==
- List of places named after people
- Communes of the Ariège department
