= Pierre Bayle =

French philosopher and writer (1647–1706)

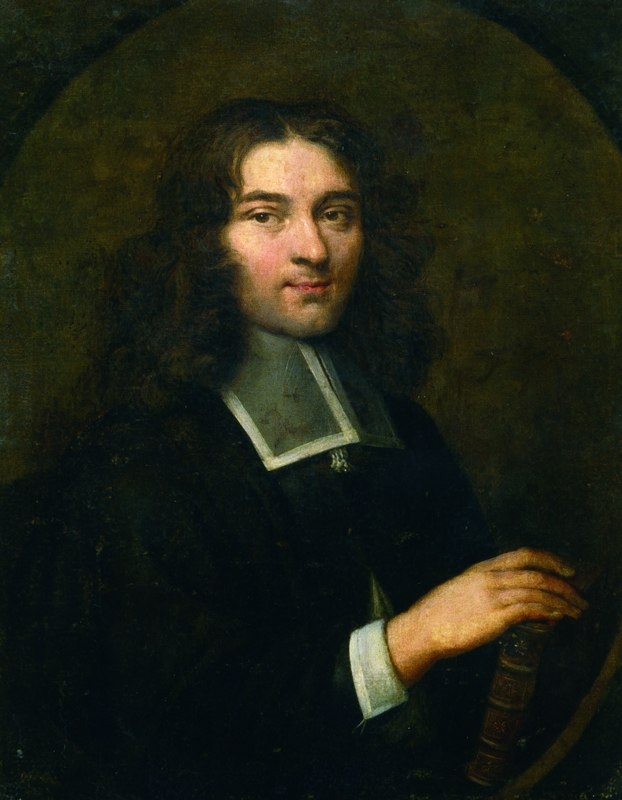
- Portrait by Louis Elle the Younger, c. 1675
- Born: 18 November 1647; Carla-le-Comte, County of Foix, Kingdom of France
- Died: 28 December 1706 (aged 59); Rotterdam, Dutch Republic

Education
- Education: Academy of Geneva
- Academic advisor: Jean-Robert Chouet

Philosophical work
- Era: 17th-century philosophy
- Region: Western philosophy
- School: Philosophical skepticism
- Institutions: Academy of Sedan; Illustere school (Rotterdam)
- Main interests: Epistemology
- Notable ideas: Bayle's skeptical trilemma

Pierre Bayle (/beɪl/; French: [pjɛʁ bɛl]; 18 November 1647 – 28 December 1706) was a French philosopher, author, and lexicographer. He is best known for his Historical and Critical Dictionary, whose publication began in 1697. Many of the more controversial ideas in the book were hidden away in the voluminous footnotes, or they were slipped into articles on seemingly uncontroversial topics. Bayle is commonly regarded as a forerunner of the Encyclopédistes of the mid-18th century.

A Huguenot, Bayle fled to the Dutch Republic in 1681 because of religious persecution in France. Bayle was a notable advocate of religious toleration, and his skeptical philosophy had a significant influence on the subsequent growth and development of the European Age of Enlightenment.

Leibniz's Théodicée was formed in response to Bayle. Voltaire called Bayle "the greatest dialectician to have ever written." The English translation of The Dictionary was identified by American President Thomas Jefferson to be among the one hundred foundational texts to form the first collection of the Library of Congress.

== Biography ==
Bayle was born at Carla-le-Comte (later renamed Carla-Bayle in his honour), near Pamiers, Ariège, France. He was educated by his father, a Calvinist minister, and at an academy at Puylaurens. In 1669, he entered a Jesuit college at Toulouse and became a Roman Catholic a month later. After seventeen months, he returned to Calvinism and fled to Geneva, where he learned about the teachings of René Descartes. He returned to France and went to Paris, where for some years he worked under the name of Bèle as a tutor for various families. In 1675, he was appointed to the chair of philosophy at the (Protestant) Academy of Sedan. In 1681, the university at Sedan was suppressed by the government in action against Protestants.

Just before that event, Bayle had fled to the Dutch Republic, where he almost immediately was appointed professor of philosophy and history at the Illustere school (Rotterdam). He taught for many years but became embroiled in a long, internal quarrel in the college that resulted in Bayle being deprived of his chair in 1693.

Bayle remained in Rotterdam until his death on 28 December 1706. He was buried in Rotterdam in the Walloon church, where Pierre Jurieu would also be buried seven years later. After the demolition of this church in 1922, the graves were relocated to the Crooswijk General Cemetery in Rotterdam. A memorial stone shows that Pierre Bayle is in these graves.

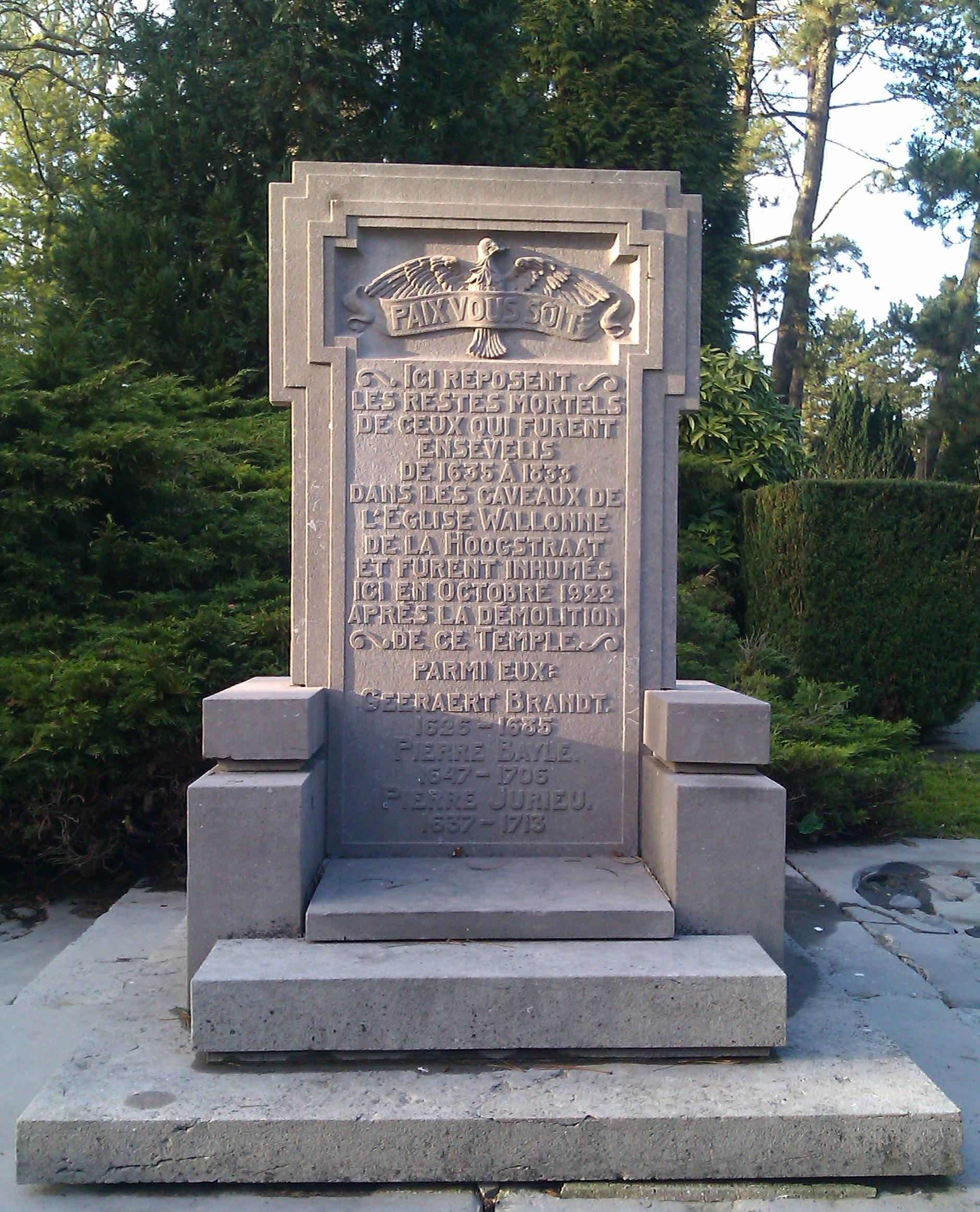
Memorial stone for the Walloon graves on the General Cemetery in Crooswijk. Among them, Pierre Bayle.

== Writings ==
At Rotterdam, Bayle published his famous Reflections on the Comet in 1682, as well as his critique of Louis Maimbourg's work on the history of Calvinism. The reputation achieved by this critique stirred the envy of Pierre Jurieu, Bayle's Calvinist colleague of both Sedan and Rotterdam, who had written a book on the same subject.

Between 1684 and 1687, Bayle published his Nouvelles de la république des lettres, a journal of literary criticism.

In his Commentaire philosophique (Parts 1 and 2 1686, Part 3 1687, Supplement 1688) Bayle argued for freedom of conscience and toleration in religious matters.

In 1690 there appeared a work entitled Avis important aux refugiés, which Jurieu attributed to Bayle, whom he attacked with great animosity. After losing his chair, Bayle engaged in the preparation of his massive Dictionnaire Historique et Critique (Historical and Critical Dictionary), which effectively constituted one of the first encyclopaedias (before the term had come into wide circulation) of ideas and their originators. In the Dictionary, Bayle expressed his view that much that was considered to be "truth" was actually just opinion, and that gullibility and stubbornness were prevalent. The Dictionary would remain an important scholarly work for several generations after its publication.

The remaining years of Bayle's life were devoted to miscellaneous writings; in many cases, he was responding to criticisms made of his Dictionary.

Voltaire, in the prelude to his Poème sur le désastre de Lisbonne, calls Bayle "le plus grand dialecticien qui ait jamais écrit": the greatest dialectician to have ever written.

The Nouvelles de la république des lettres was the first thoroughgoing attempt to popularise literature, and it was eminently successful. His multi-volume Historical and Critical Dictionary constitutes Bayle's masterpiece. The English translation of The Dictionary, by Bayle's fellow Huguenot exile Pierre des Maizeaux, was identified by American President Thomas Jefferson to be among the one hundred foundational texts to form the first collection of the Library of Congress.

=== Views on toleration ===
Bayle advanced arguments for religious toleration in his Dictionnaire historique et critique and Commentaire Philosophique. Bayle rejected the use of scripture to justify coercion and violence: "One must transcribe almost the whole New Testament to collect all the Proofs it affords us of that Gentleness and Long-suffering, which constitute the distinguishing and essential Character of the Gospel." He did not regard toleration as a danger to the state; on the contrary:

"If the Multiplicity of Religions prejudices the State, it proceeds from their not bearing with one another but on the contrary endeavouring each to crush and destroy the other by methods of Persecution. In a word, all the Mischief arises not from Toleration, but from the want of it."

=== Skepticism ===
Richard Popkin has advanced the view that Pierre Bayle was a skeptic who used the Historical and Critical Dictionary to criticise all prior known theories and philosophies. (Many scholars disagree.) In Bayle's view, humans were inherently incapable of achieving true knowledge. Because of the limitations of human reason, men should adhere instead to their conscience alone. Bayle was critical of many influential rationalists, such as René Descartes, Baruch Spinoza, Nicolas Malebranche and Gottfried Wilhelm Leibniz, as well as empiricists such as Thomas Hobbes, John Locke, and Isaac Newton. Popkin quotes the following passage as an example of Bayle's skeptical viewpoint:

It [reason] is a guide that leads one astray; and philosophy can be compared to some powders that are so corrosive that, after they have eaten away the infected flesh of a wound, they then devour the living flesh, rot the bones, and penetrate to the very marrow. Philosophy at first refutes errors. But if it is not stopped at this point, it goes on to attack truths. And when it is left on its own, it goes so far that it no longer knows where it is and can find no stopping place.

=== Problem of evil ===
Bayle is particularly famous for addressing the problem of evil in philosophy and theology. He argued that rational theology is incapable of justifying the existence of evil in a world created by a benevolent God. Bayle criticized Christian theology by reviving Persian theology (such as Zoroastrianism and Manichaeism), which has contrasting forces of good and evil in creation. This led Leibniz to write his only published work, the Théodicée.

== Legacy and honors ==
- In 1906 a statue in his honor was erected at Pamiers, la reparation d'un long oubli ("the reparation of a long neglect").
- In 1959 a street was named after him in Rotterdam.
- In 2012 a bench (By Paul Cox) in tribute to Bayle, to reflect on the (hypothetical) philosophical exchange of thought between Bayle and Erasmus. (concept of thought: JW van den Blink)

== Selected works ==
- Pensées Diverses sur l'Occasion de la Comète, (1682) translated as Various Thoughts on the Occasion of a Comet (2000) by Robert C. Bartlett, SUNY Press.
- A Philosophical Commentary on These Words of the Gospel, Luke 14:23, “Compel Them to Come In, That My House May Be Full”, Edited and with an Introduction by John Kilcullen and Chandran Kukathas (Indianapolis: Liberty Fund, 2005).
- Dictionnaire Historique et Critique (1695–1697; 1702, enlarged; best that of P. des Maizeaux, 4 vols., 1740)
- Œuvres diverses, 5 vols., The Hague, 1727–31; anastatic reprint: Hildesheim: Georg Olms, 1964–68.
- Selections in English: Pierre Bayle (Richard H. Popkin transl.), Historical and Critical Dictionary – Selections, Indianapolis: Hackett, 1991. ISBN 978-0-87220-103-3.

== See also ==
- Elisabeth Labrousse
