= Daniel Gardelle =

Swiss miniature painter (1679–1753)

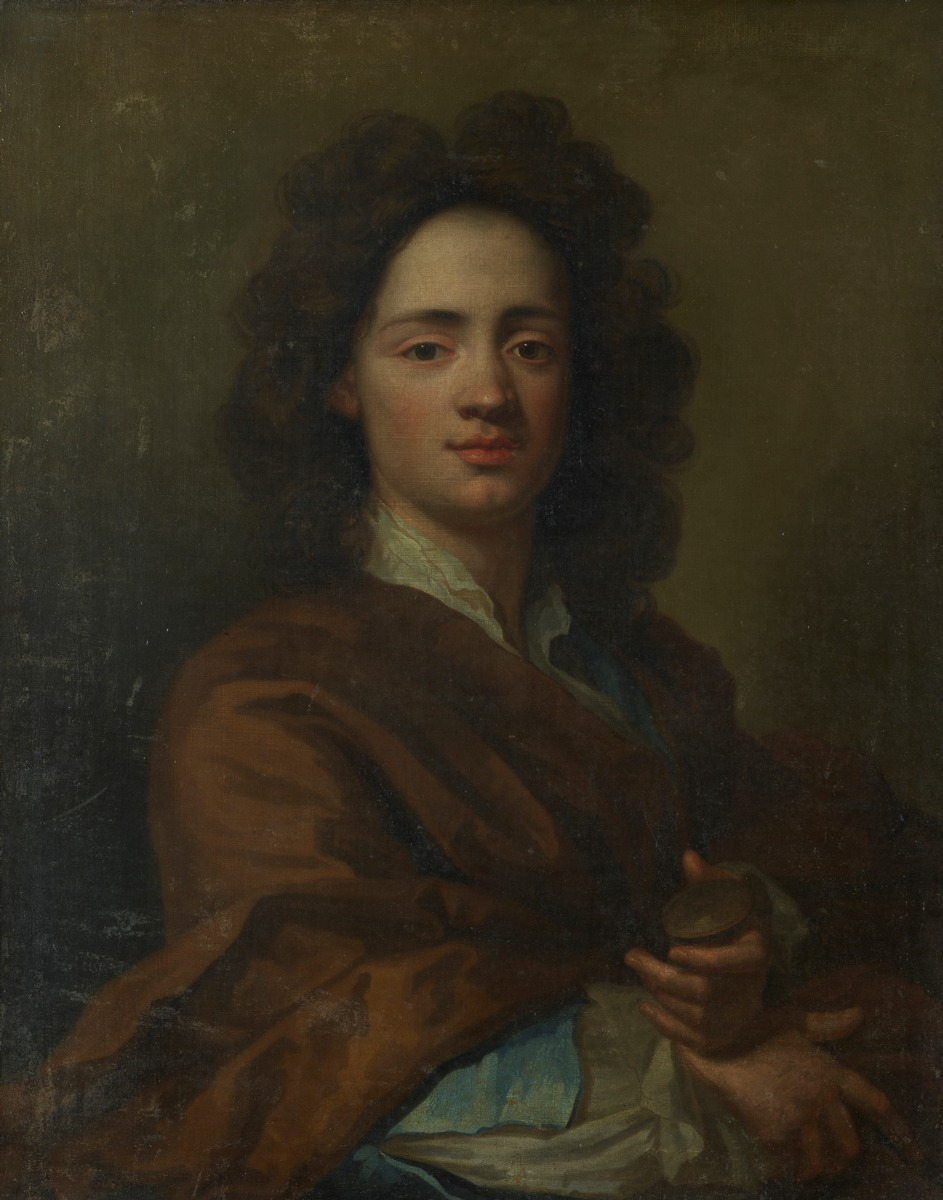
Portrait by Jean-Charles Quiter, 1702

Daniel Gardelle (Geneva, 2 October 1679, in – Geneva, 9 October 1753) was a Genevan miniature painter, best remembered for training Jean-Étienne Liotard and Pierre Soubeyran in miniature painting and engraving. He was the brother of Robert Gardelle.
