= Poème sur le désastre de Lisbonne =

Poem in French composed by Voltaire

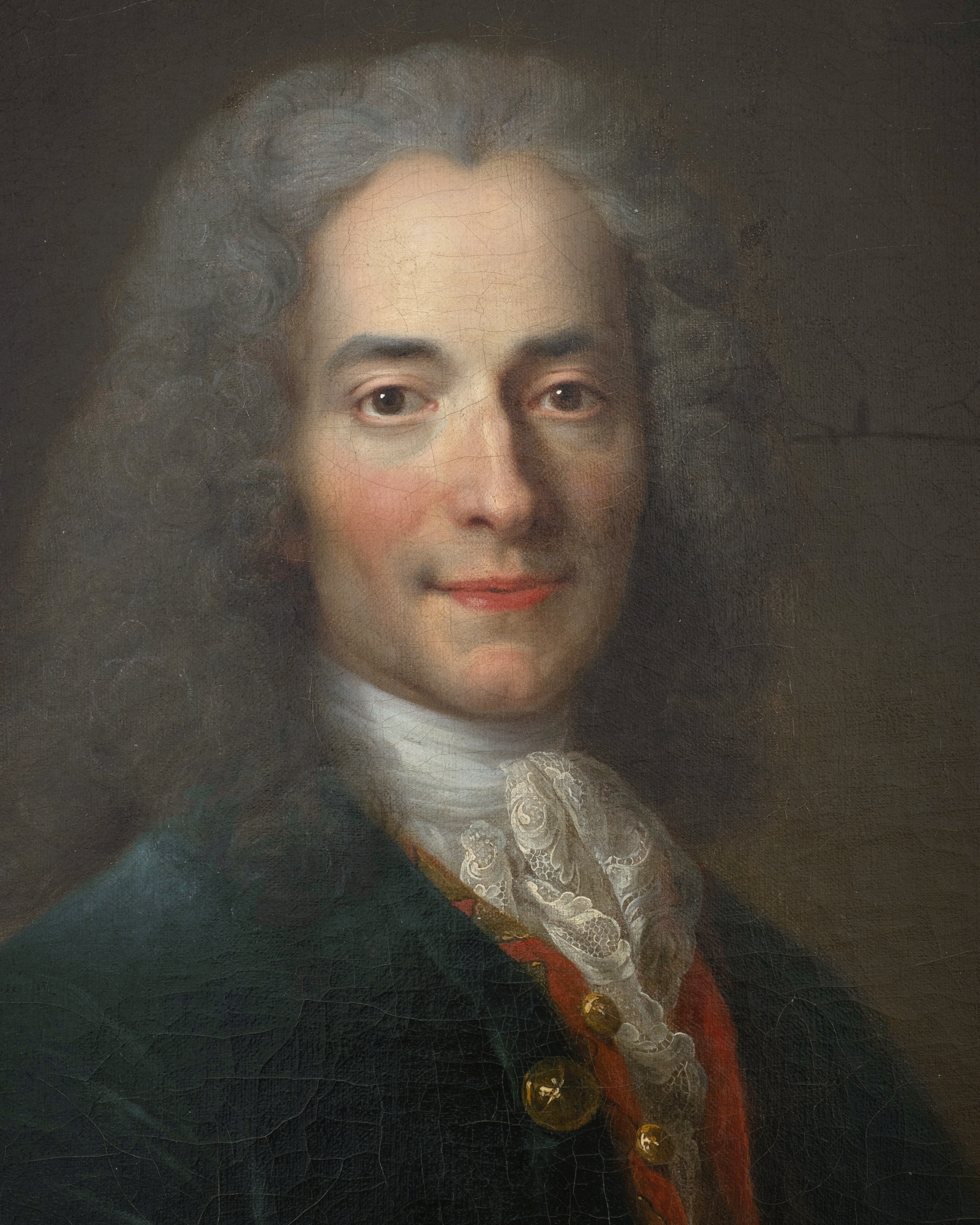
François-Marie Arouet (1694–1778), known as Voltaire, French Enlightenment writer and philosopher

The "Poème sur le désastre de Lisbonne" (English title: Poem on the Lisbon Disaster) is a poem in French composed by Voltaire as a response to the 1755 Lisbon earthquake. It is widely regarded as an introduction to Voltaire's 1759 acclaimed novel Candide and his view on the problem of evil. The 180-line poem was composed in December 1755 and published in 1756. It is considered one of the most savage literary attacks on optimism.

== Background ==
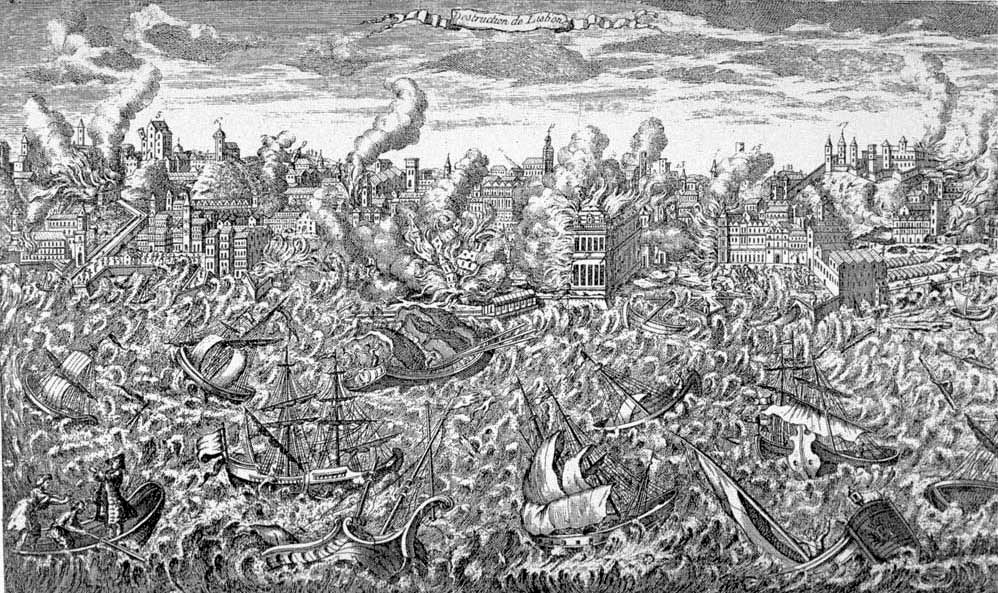
1755 copper engraving showing Lisbon in flames and a tsunami overwhelming the ships in the harbour

The earthquake of 1 November 1755 completely devastated the Portuguese capital Lisbon. The city was reduced to ruins, and between 30,000 and 50,000 people were killed. One of the most destructive earthquakes in history, the event had a major effect on the cultural consciousness of much of Europe. Voltaire was one of many philosophers, theologians and intellectuals to be deeply affected by the disaster.

The polymath Gottfried Wilhelm Leibniz and the poet Alexander Pope were famous for developing a system of thought known as philosophical optimism in an attempt to reconcile a loving Christian God with the seeming indifference of nature in disasters such as Lisbon. The phrase what is, is right coined by Alexander Pope in his Essay on Man, and Leibniz' affirmation we live in the best of all possible worlds, provoked Voltaire's scorn. He railed against what he perceived as intricate but empty philosophizing which served only to demean humanity and ultimately led to fatalism.

The earthquake further bolstered Voltaire's philosophical pessimism and deism. The prevalence of evil, he argued, prevented the possible existence of a benevolent loving deity who intervened in human affairs to reward the virtuous and punish the guilty. He asserted instead that the disaster revealed the abject and ignorant nature of humankind. For Voltaire, people might well hope for a happier state, but to expect more was contrary to reason.

== Structure ==
Like many of Voltaire's other poems, Lisbonne consists entirely of rhyming couplets in continual progression. There are no stanzas dividing its 180 lines. Voltaire also included footnotes elucidating such terms as the universal chain and man's nature.

== Theme and interpretation ==
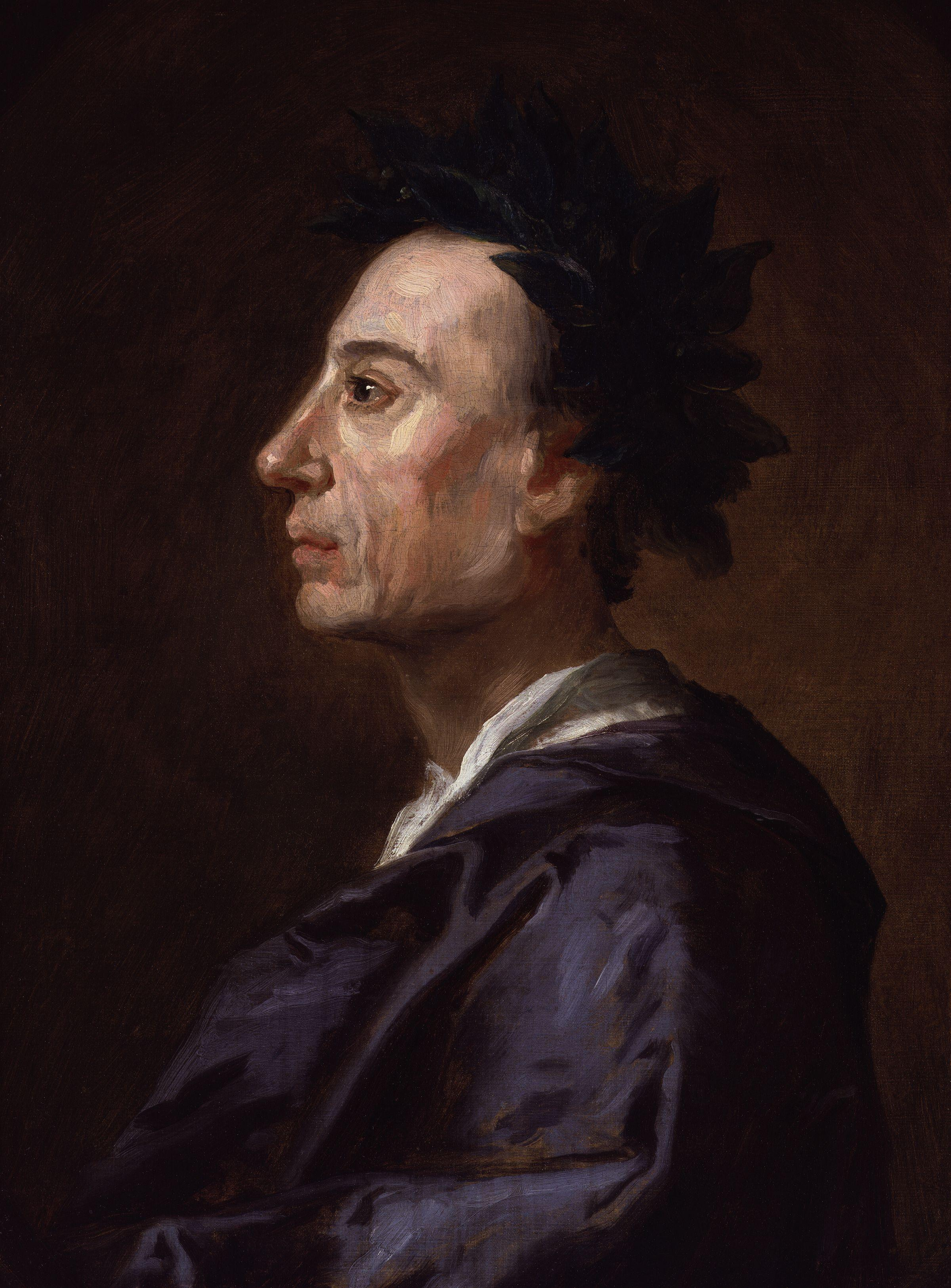
Alexander Pope was a target of the poem as a result of his declaration "What is, is right"

Unlike the lighthearted satire of Candide, the Lisbonne poem strikes a pitying, dark, and solemn tone.

In his preface, Voltaire makes several objections to philosophical optimism:

'If it be true,' they said, 'that whatever is, is right, it follows that human nature is not fallen.
If the order of things requires that everything should be as it is, then human nature has not been
corrupted, and consequently has no need for a Redeemer.
...
if the miseries of individuals are merely the by-product of this general and necessary order,
then we are nothing more than cogs which serve to keep the great machine in motion; we are no
more precious in the eyes of God than the animals by which we are devoured.'

Arguing by reductio ad absurdum, Voltaire elaborates on the inherent contradiction in the dictum what is, is right. For if this were true, then human nature would not be fallen and salvation would be unnecessary.

He (Bayle) says that Revelation alone can untie the great knot which
philosophers have only managed to tangle further, that nothing but the hope of our
continued existence in a future state can console us under the present misfortunes;
that the goodness of Providence is the only sanctuary in which man can take
shelter during this general eclipse of his reason, and amidst the calamities to
which his weak and frail nature is exposed.

Voltaire shows his admiration of both Bayle, who was a skeptic, and Locke, who was an empiricist. In his footnotes, Voltaire argues the self-evidence of humankind's epistemological shortcomings, since the human mind derives all knowledge from experience, which cannot give us insight into what preceded it, nor what follows it, nor what presently supports it.

In the poem itself, grieving for the misery created by the earthquake and questioning whether a just and compassionate God would seek to punish sins through such cruelty, Voltaire argued that the all-powerful God Leibniz and Pope hypothesized could have prevented the innocent suffering of the sinners, reduced the scale of destruction, or announced his purpose of purifying mankind.

And can you then impute a sinful deed
To babes who on their mothers' bosoms bleed?
Was then more vice in fallen Lisbon found,
Than Paris, where voluptuous joys abound?
Was less debauchery to London known,
Where opulence luxurious holds the throne?

He rejected the charge that selfishness and pride had made him rebel against suffering:

When the earth gapes my body to entomb,
I justly may complain of such a doom.

In the poem, Voltaire rejected belief in "Providence" as impossible to defend — he believed that all living things seemed doomed to live in a cruel world. Voltaire concludes that human beings are weak, ignorant and condemned to suffer throughout life. There is no divine system or message as guidance, and God does not concern himself with human beings, or communicate with them.

We rise in thought to the heavenly throne,
But our own nature still remains unknown.

No matter the complexity, depth, or sophistication of philosophical and theological systems, Voltaire contended that our human origins remain unknown.

'Heav'n, on our sufferings cast a pitying eye.'
All's right, you answer, the eternal cause
Rules not by partial, but by general laws.

These lines refer specifically to the common rebuttal made by the optimists of the time as to the problem of evil. Although the presence of evil in the world is evident, human beings cannot understand the motions of God. The suffering in the earthquake played a part in the greater good somewhere else.

Yet in this direful chaos you'd compose
A general bliss from individuals' woes?
Oh worthless bliss! in injured reason's sight,
With faltering voice you cry, 'What is, is right'?

Voltaire draws attention to the assertion made by Alexander Pope in his An Essay on Man that 'What is, is right'. These lines contradict Pope's (and later Leibniz') Optimism.

But how conceive a God, the source of love
Who on man lavished blessings from above
Then would the race with various plagues confound
Can mortals penetrate His views profound?
Ill could not from a perfect being spring
Nor from another, as God is sovereign king;
And yet, sad truth! in this our world 'tis found
What contradictions here my soul confound!

Voltaire held a deep belief in the goodness and sovereignty of God as exemplified in the verses above. He takes a pessimistic view to the existence of evil, and stresses man's ultimate ignorance.

Mysteries like these can no man penetrate
Hid from his view remains the book of fate

== Criticism ==
Through his work, Voltaire criticized religious figures and philosophers such as the optimists Pope and Leibniz but endorsed the views of the skeptic Pierre Bayle and the empiricist John Locke. Voltaire was, in turn, criticized by the philosopher Jean-Jacques Rousseau, who had been mailed a copy of the poem by Voltaire, who received a letter carrying Rousseau's criticism on 18 August 1756. Rousseau criticised Voltaire for seeking to apply science to spiritual questions and argued that evil is necessary to the existence of the universe and that particular evils form the general good. Rousseau implied that Voltaire had to renounce the concept of Providence or to conclude that it is, in the last analysis, beneficial. Rousseau was convinced that Voltaire had written Candide as a rebuttal to the argument that the former had made.
