= Crooswijk General Cemetery =

Cemetery in Rotterdam, Netherlands

Coordinates: 51°56′19″N 4°29′29″E

Crooswijk General Cemetery (Algemene Begraafplaats Crooswijk) is a cemetery in Rotterdam, the Netherlands.

== History ==
As in many countries, burial within city limits became illegal in Rotterdam in 1827. Crooswijk was taken into use in 1832, although the cemetery had not been finished yet. Due to the outbreak of a Cholera epidemic, burial space was needed quickly. In 1915 a new entrance was taken into use. The old entrance still exists.

When the Walloon church was demolished in 1922 the contents of the graves were transferred to the cemetery and a memorial was put in place. When the Laurenskerk was severely damaged by bombing in 1940, many of the graves were also transferred to Crooswijk.

The cemetery is laid out as a park. The cemetery is a general (non-denominational) cemetery. There are sections for casualties of wars, the resistance in the Second World War. There is also a fast-growing Islamic section.

Many of the trees symbolise grief such as Weeping Beech, Silver Birch (Betula pendula var. Tristis, which in Dutch is known as the Weeping Birch), Dutch Elm (in Dutch known as Weeping Elm) and Weeping Willow.

The cemetery is a national heritage site (Rijksmonument) in the Netherlands, as are some of the buildings in the cemetery and are therefore protected.

== Notable Burials ==
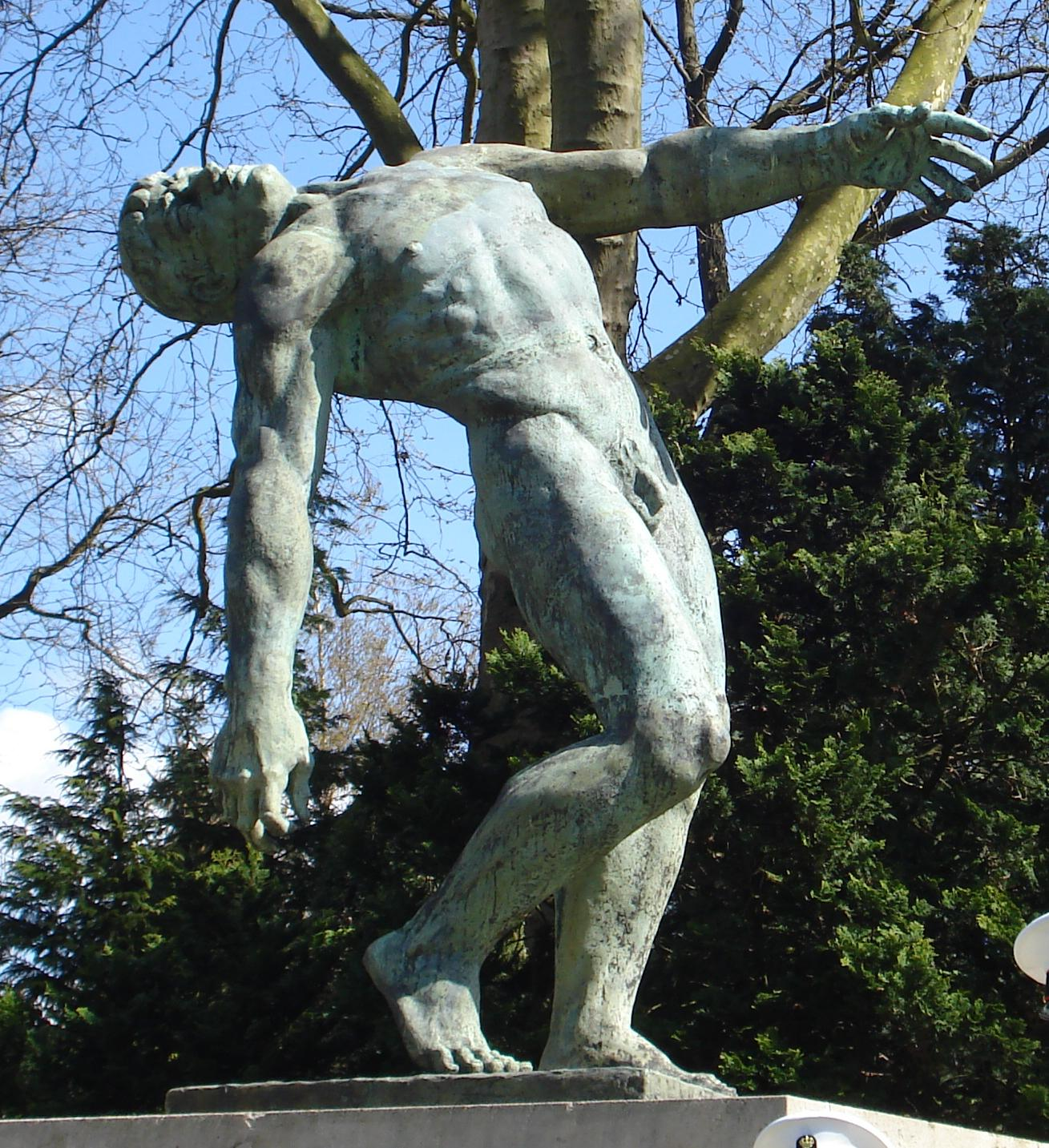
The Falling Man, the monument in the Dutch Military Field of Honor

- City and port

Many well known people from Rotterdam and families who had companies in the port (the "harbour barons") are buried here.

- Politicians

Gerrit Hendrik Kersten, Minister and politician, founder of the SGP
Yevhen Konovalets, leader of the Organization of Ukrainian Nationalists (repatriated to Ukraine in 2026)
Hendrik Spiekman, one of the founders of the SDAP

- From the Resistance

Christiaan Lindemans, double spy

- From the Walloon Church

Pierre Bayle, Philosopher of French origin
Gerard Brandt, Dutch preacher and writer
Pierre Jurieu, Protestant leader of French origin

- War Graves

4 pilots of the City of London Squadron, who were killed on May 10, 1940, in a bombing raid on the Waalhaven
Commonwealth War Graves (maintained by the CWGC), including 11 Polish graves
Dutch Military Field of Honor (Section P), containing 115 graves.

- Other

Frantisek Skroup (1801–1862) conductor at the opera in Rotterdam and composer of the Czech national anthem
Gerke Henkes (1844–1927), Dutch painter of the Hague School.

== Location and visit ==
The cemetery is located in Crooswijk. The new entrance is on Kerkhoflaan (near the junction with Rusthoflaan). The cemetery is open daily. A booklet containing a cultural route through the cemetery is available from the office located at the entrance (also contains a map).

== Gallery ==
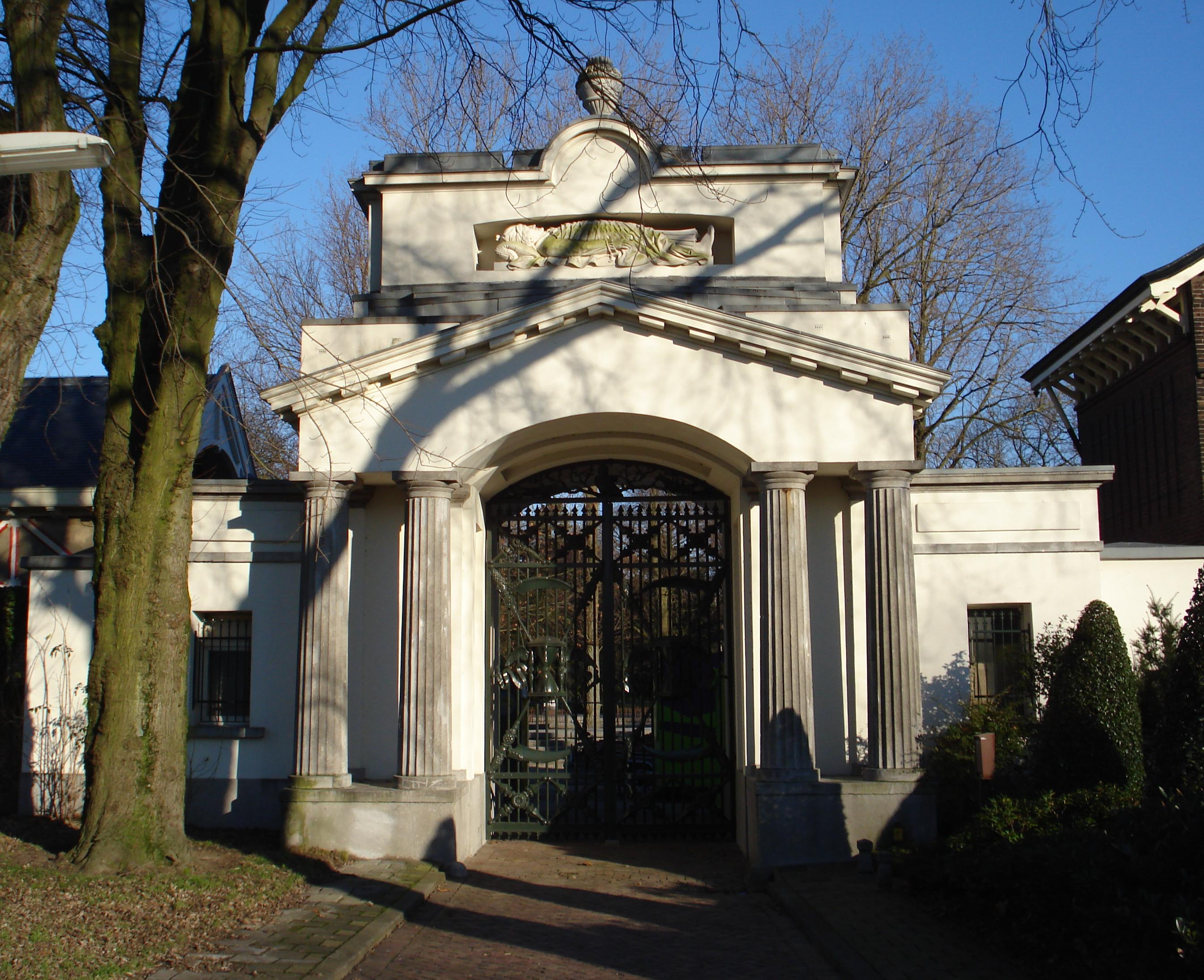
Old Entrance

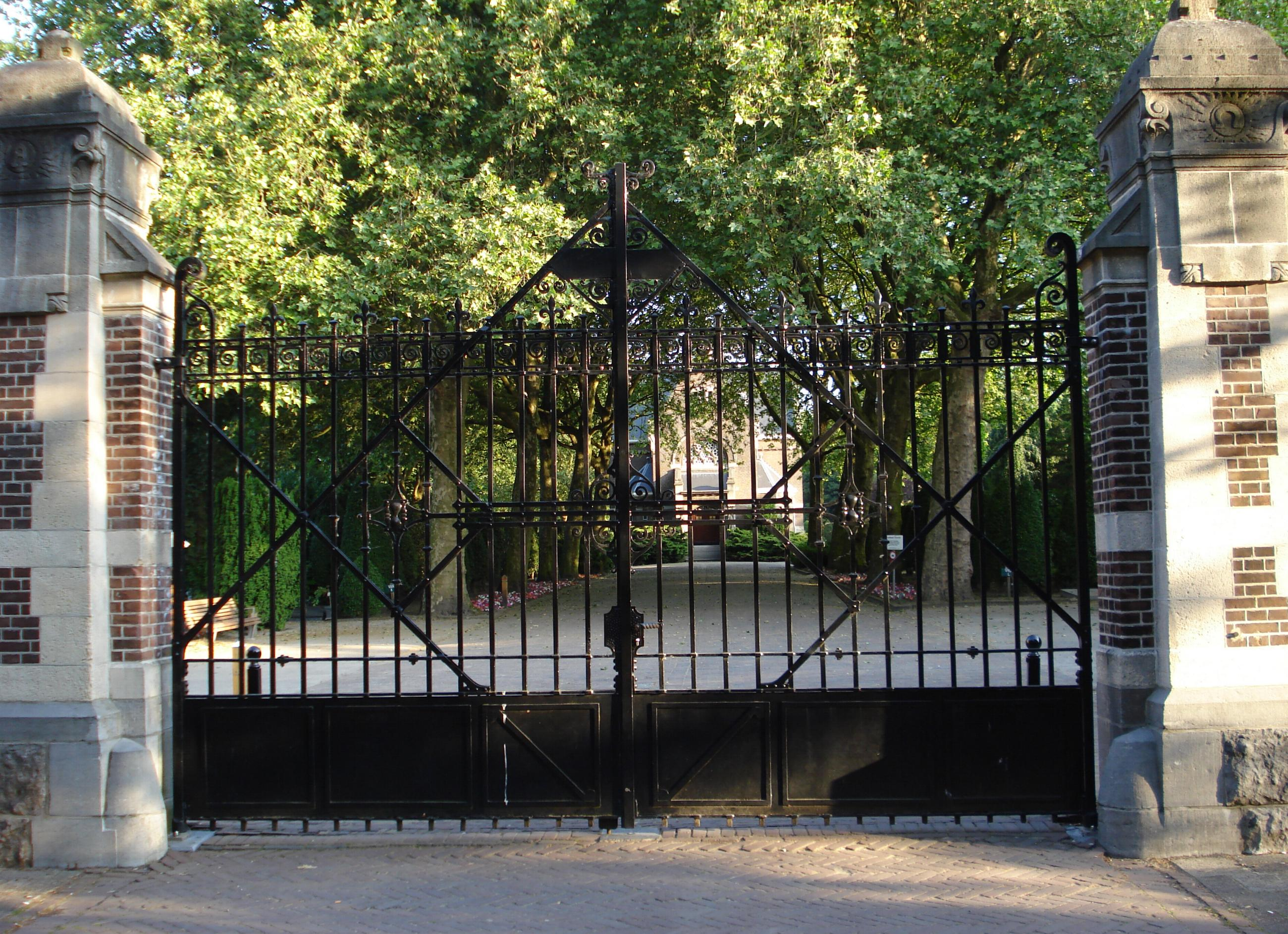
New Entrance

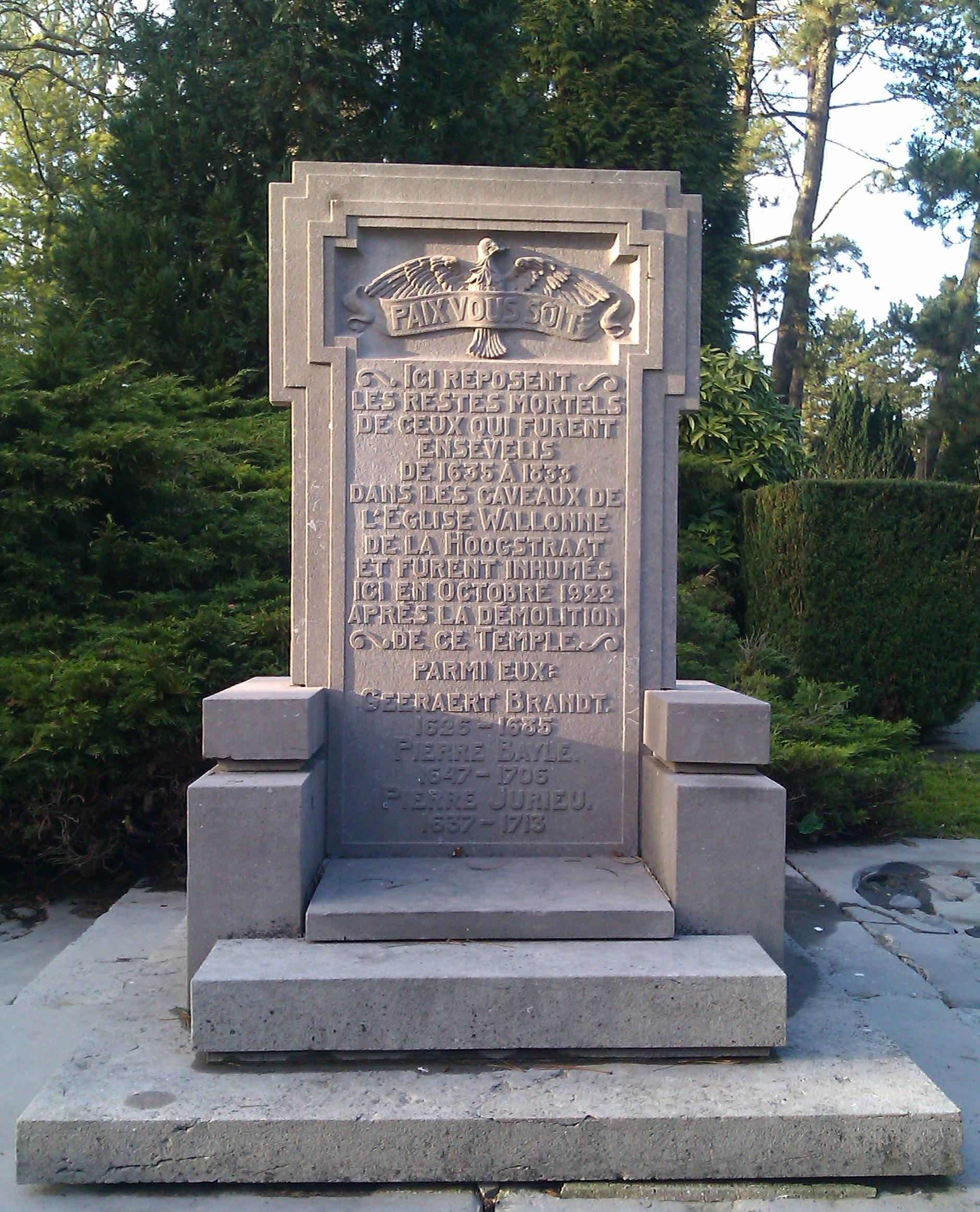
Walloon Church Memorial

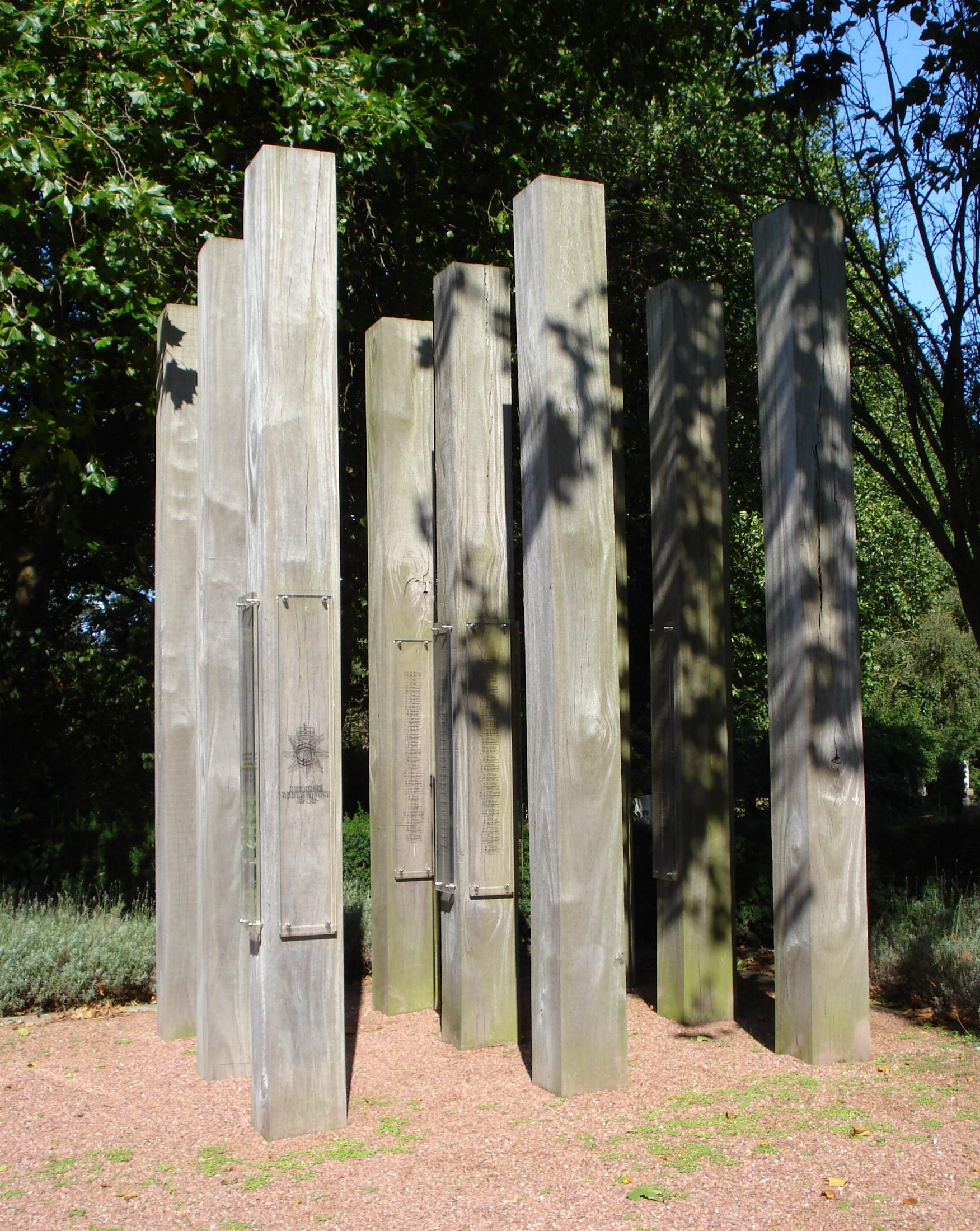
The Dutch East Indies Memorial

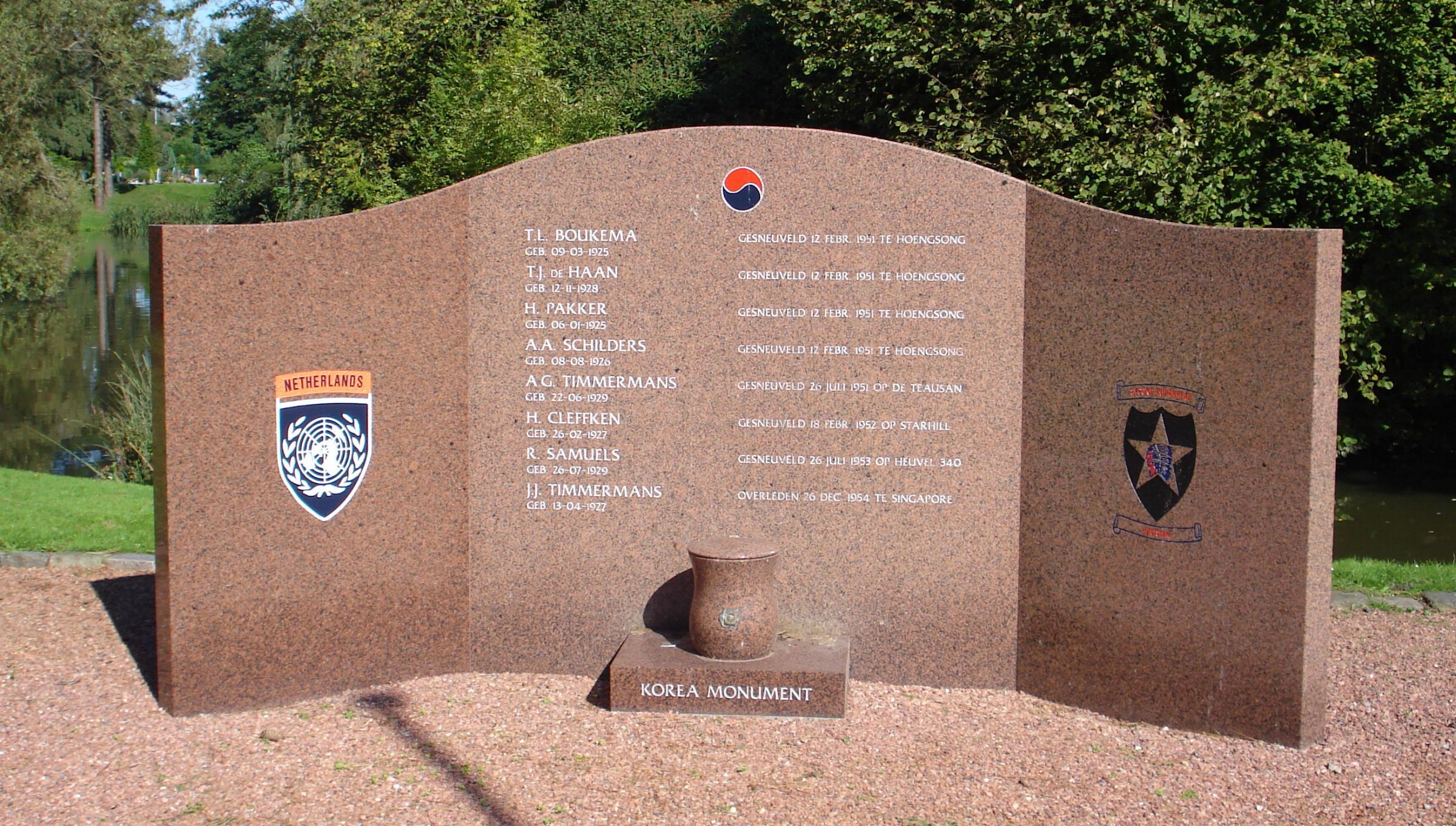
The Korea Monument

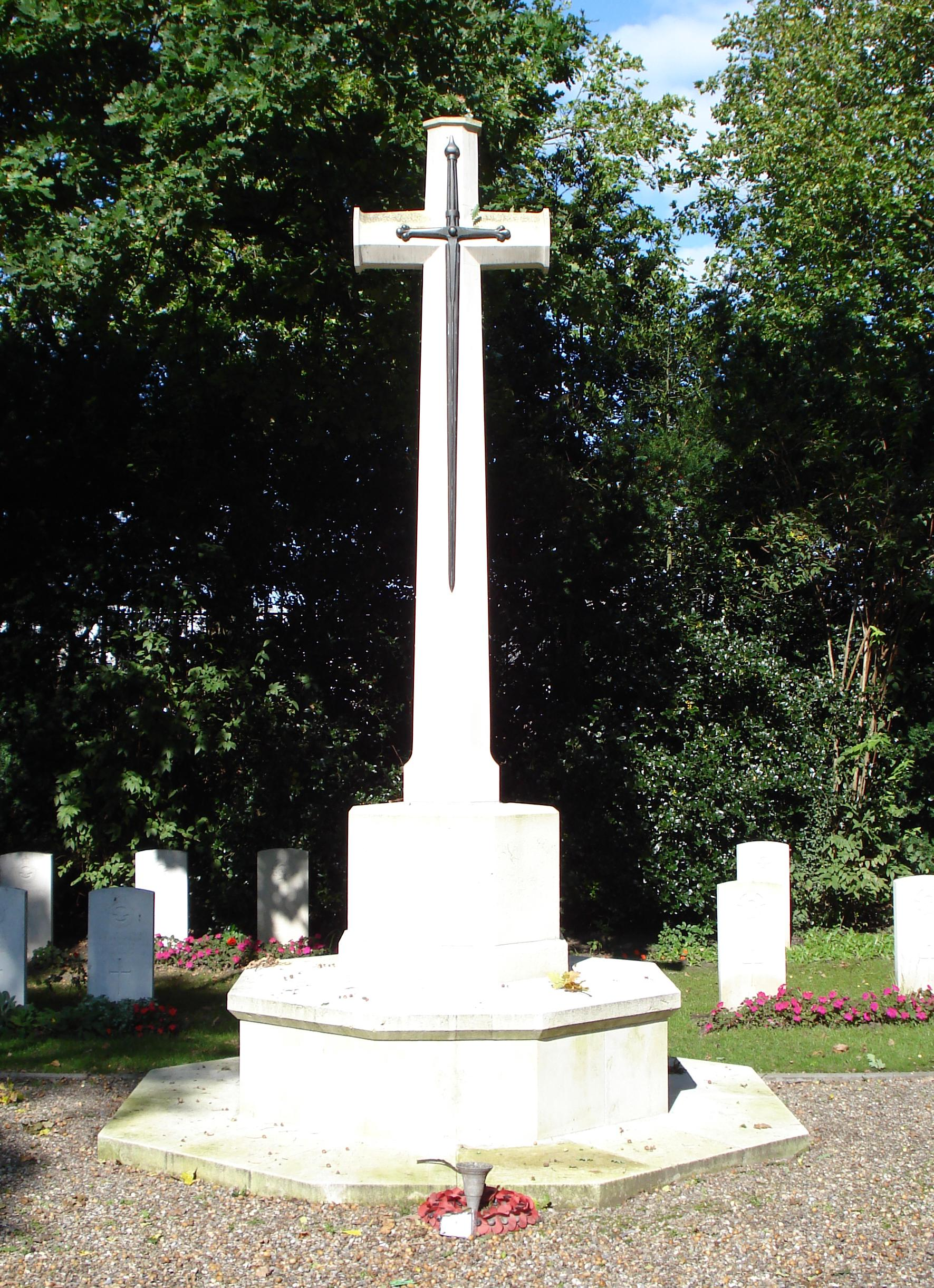
The Cross of Sacrifice

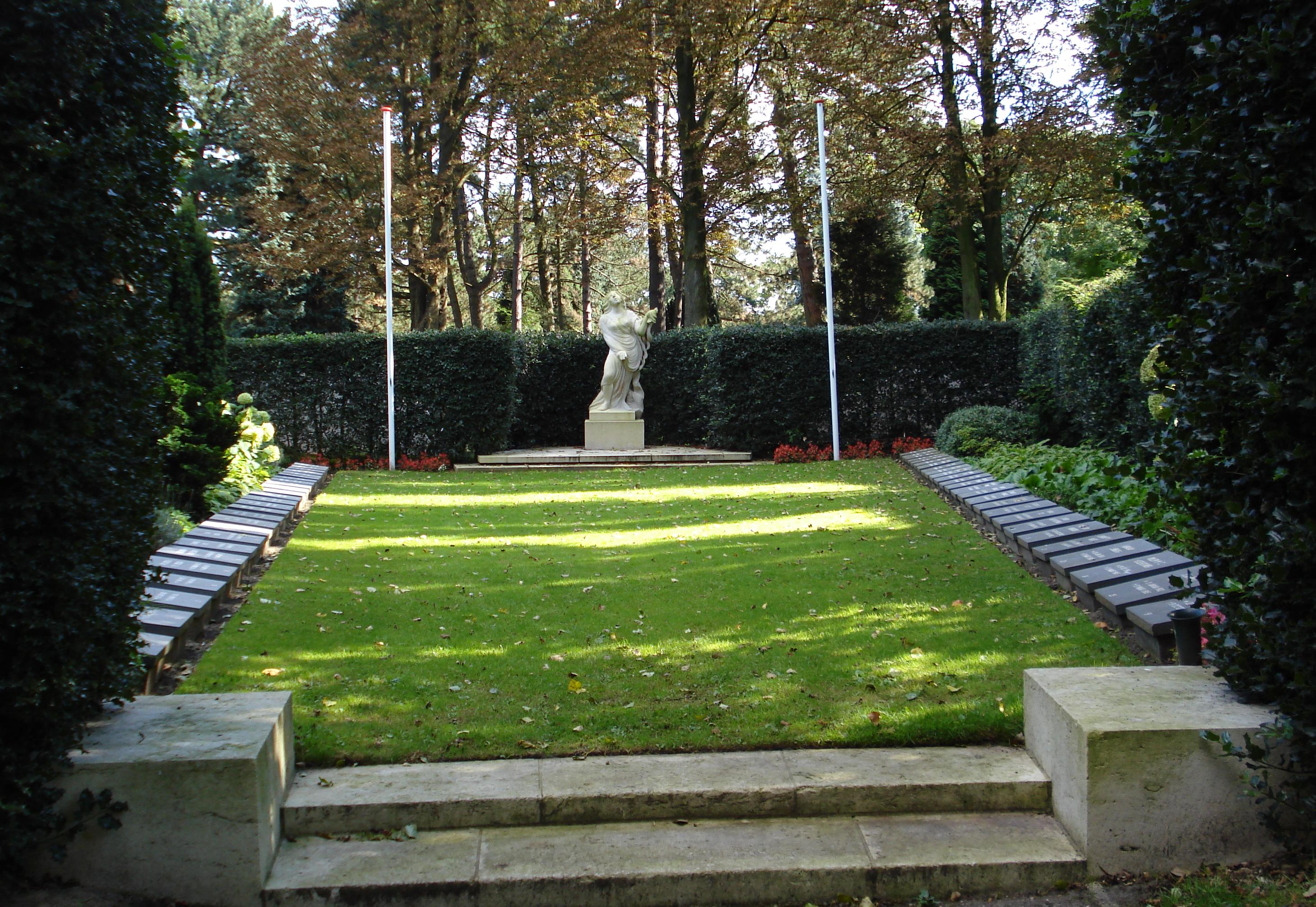
Section dedicated to resistance fighters

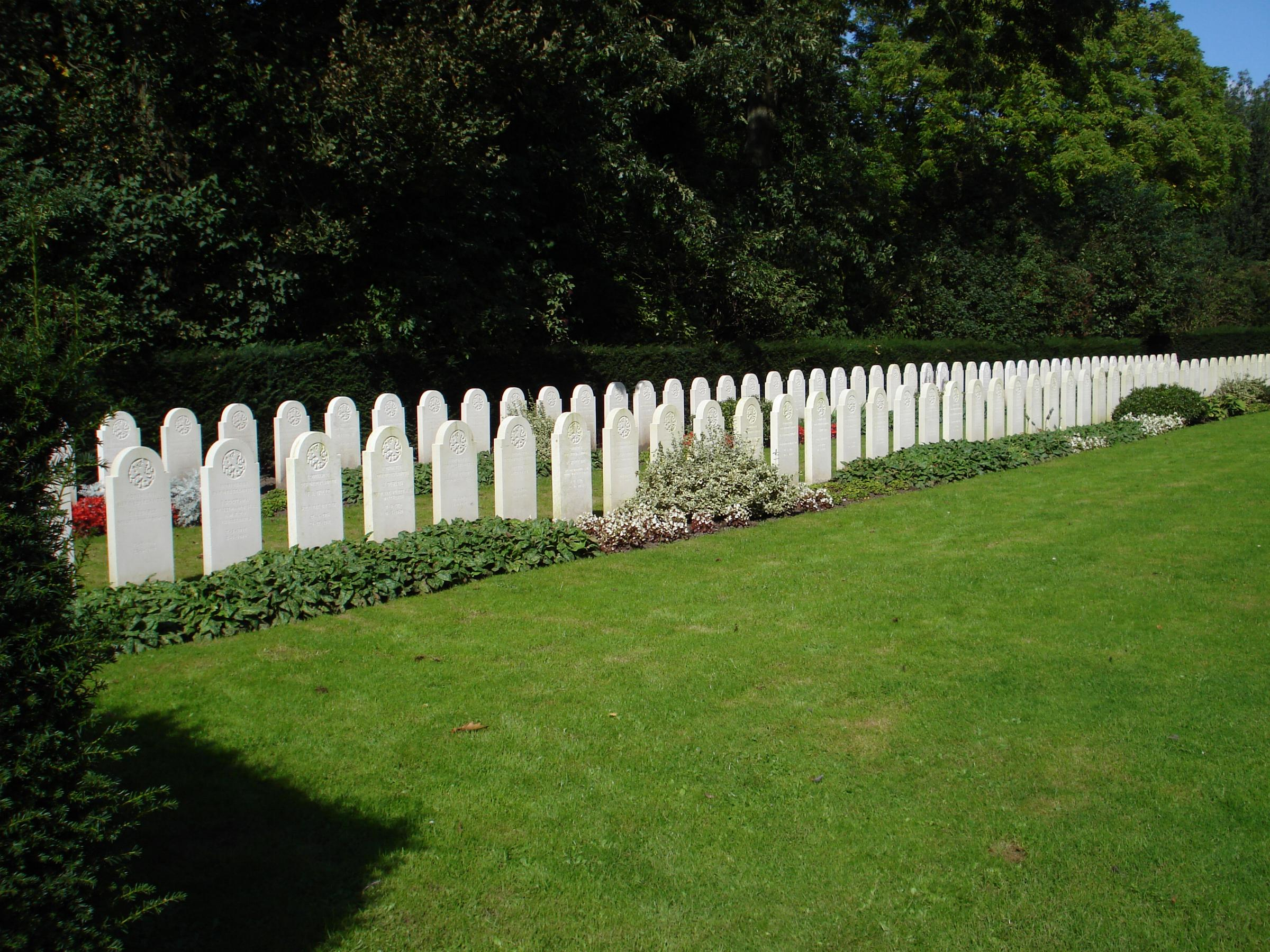
Dutch War Graves

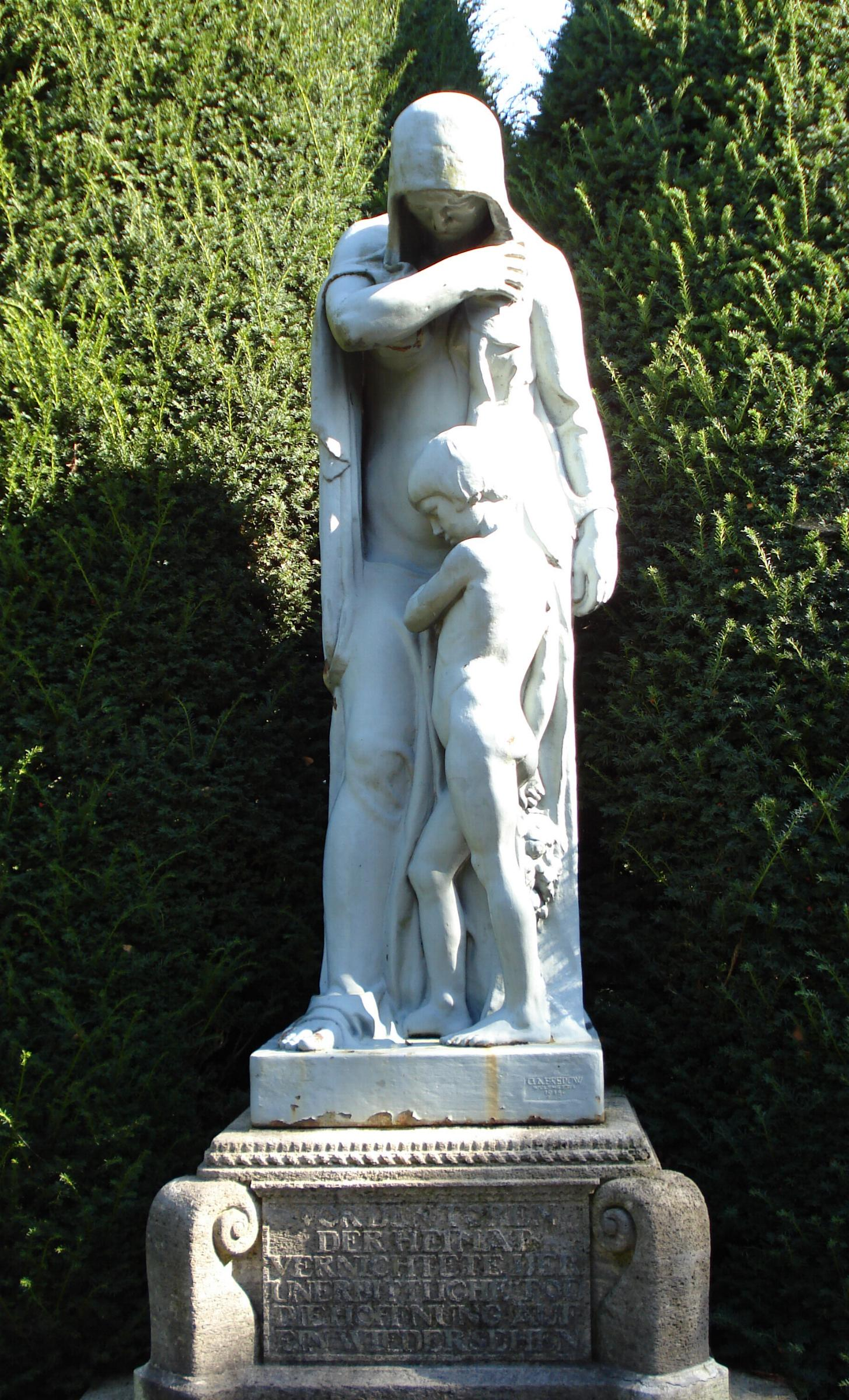
Monument for the German War Dead
