= Pierre Fatio =

Genevan politician (1662–1707)

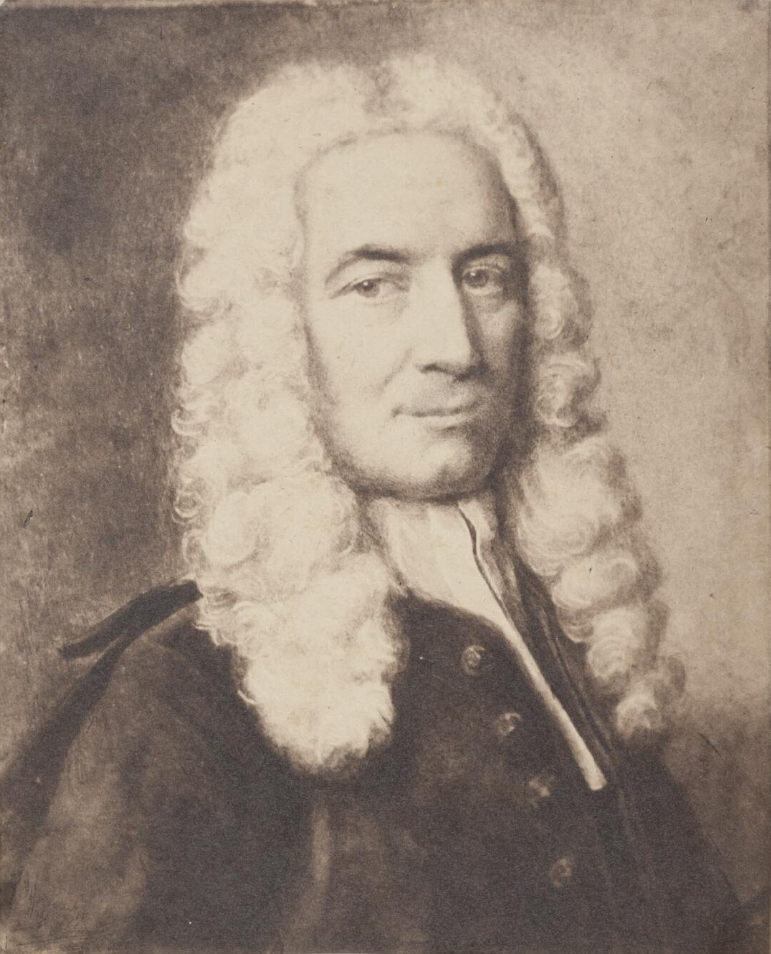
Portrait by Robert Gardelle

Pierre Fatio (7 November 1662 – 6 September 1707) was a lawyer and politician from the Republic of Geneva. His struggle against the dominance of the aristocracy in the Genevan government led to his execution on charges of conspiring against the state.

== Family and education ==
Fatio was born into a patrician family in Geneva on 7 November 1662. He was one of twenty-four children born to François Fatio and Marie Franconis. François, the son of a Protestant refugee from the Val Bregaglia, was a merchant and banker from Vevey, Switzerland, who became a citizen of the Republic of Geneva in 1647. Pierre Fatio was a cousin and contemporary of mathematician and inventor Nicolas Fatio de Duillier.

Fatio enrolled at the University of Basel in 1679 and again in 1685, receiving a doctorate in law in 1686. He also studied at Geneva, Valence, Montpellier and Leiden. Back in Geneva, Fatio established a successful law practice. In 1694 he married Elisabeth Chouet, the daughter of Léonard Chouet, councillor and general treasurer of the Republic of Geneva.

== Political career ==
The Republic of Geneva was nominally a representative democracy ruled by an elected parliament, the Council of Two Hundred, known also as the Grand Council. However, in practice most of the Grand Council's powers were delegated to the Council of Twenty-Five, known also as the Small Council, which selected its own members and was under the control of the patrician families.

Fatio was elected to the Grand Council in 1688 and held several positions in government: lord of Saint-Victor and chapter in 1691, auditor in 1696, and châtelain of Peney in 1700. In 1705, his application for the Small Council was rejected in favor of his brother, Jacques-Francois Fatio, who did not have his experience in public affairs. This reflected the ruling Genevan aristocracy's distrust of Pierre Fatio's independent and non-conformist spirit.

=== Activism and execution ===
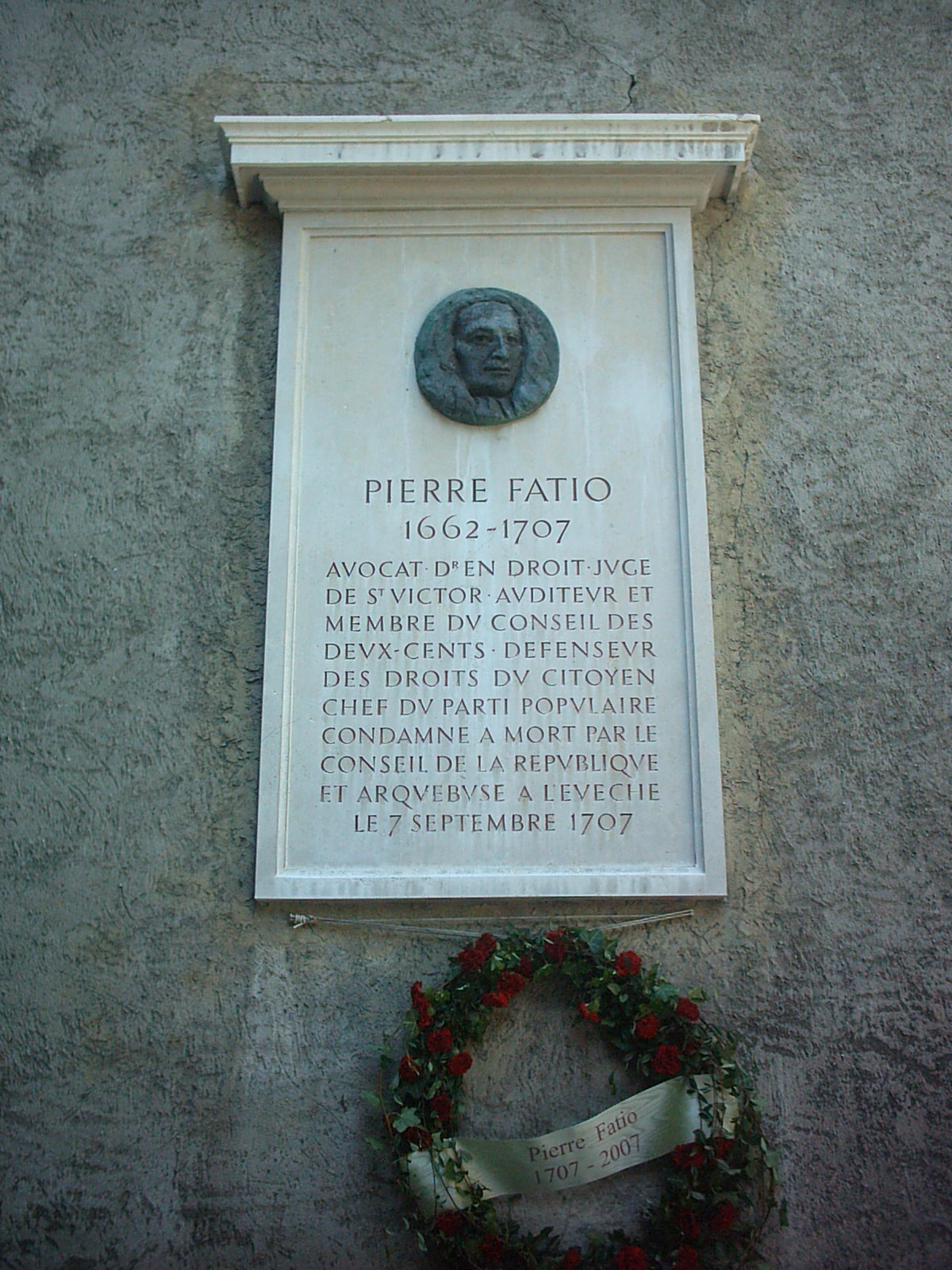
Memorial plaque located at the entrance to the Rue Calvin, in Geneva

After his rejection by the Small Council, Fatio became a spokesman for the Genevan bourgeoisie in its struggle against the dominance of the patricians. Fatio declared that the political reality in the Republic of Geneva made a mockery of the notion that the democratically elected Grand Council was sovereign, since "a sovereign that never performs an act of sovereignty is an imaginary being".

During the political troubles of 1707, Fatio proposed several democratizing reforms, including requiring that the General Council (the electoral body) meet annually. However, this was rejected by the dominant faction of his own party, which regarded Fatio's positions as too extreme. Alleging his participation in a conspiracy to overthrow the government, the Small Council condemned Fatio to death. He was shot on 6 September 1707 at the courtyard of Evêché Prison, in Geneva.

== Influence ==
Among Fatio's bourgeois supporters was Jean-Jacques Rousseau's grandfather, David Rousseau, who thereby lost his government employment. Fatio has been described by some historians as the "Swiss Gracchus". A commemorative plaque declaring him a "defender of citizens' rights" now marks the entrance to the Rue Jean Calvin, in the historical center of Geneva.

== See also ==
- Bourgeoisie of Geneva
- Geneva Revolution of 1782
- History of Geneva
