= Jean-Jacques Burlamaqui =

Genevan legal and political theorist (1694–1748)

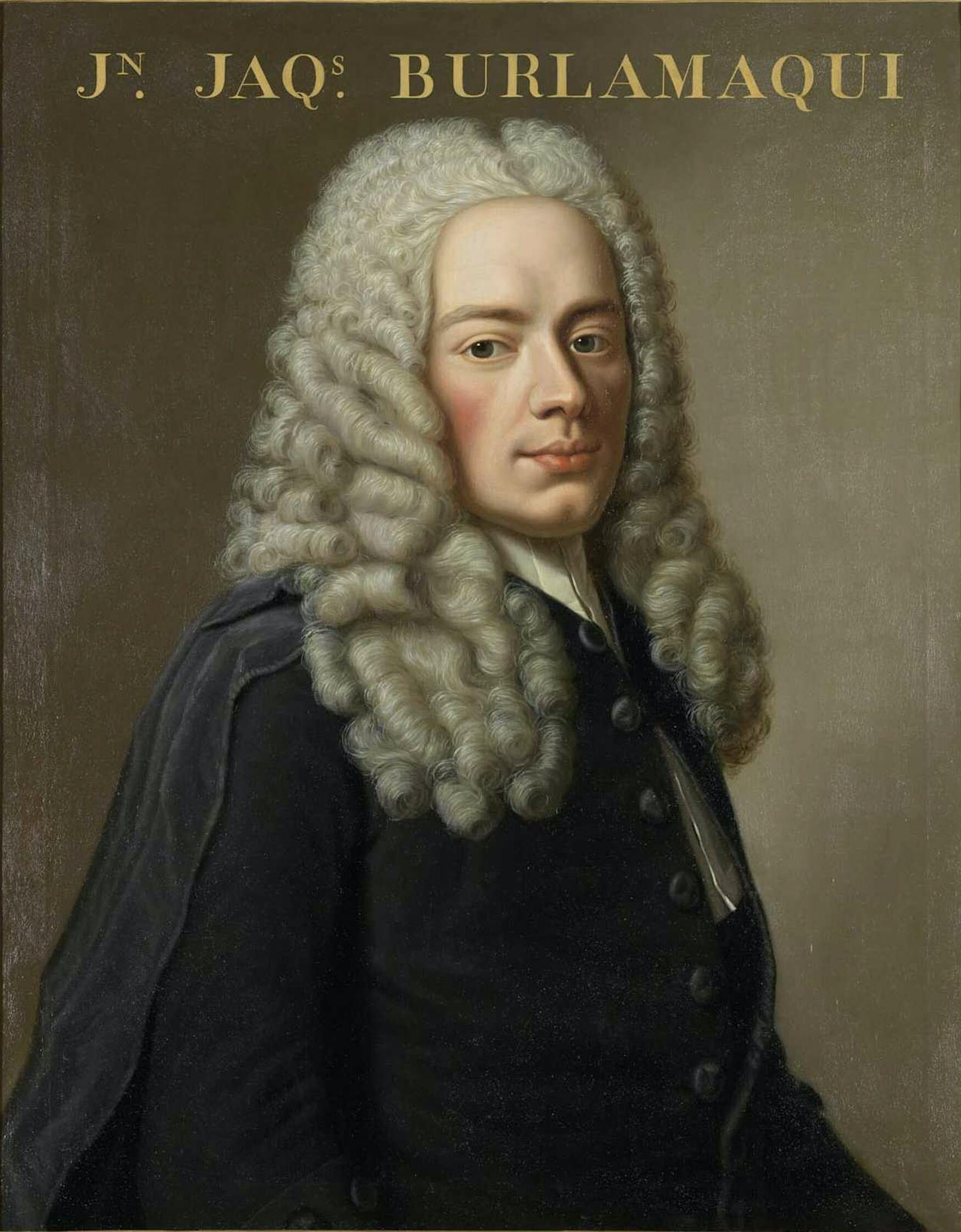
Portrait attributed to Robert Gardelle, c. 1760

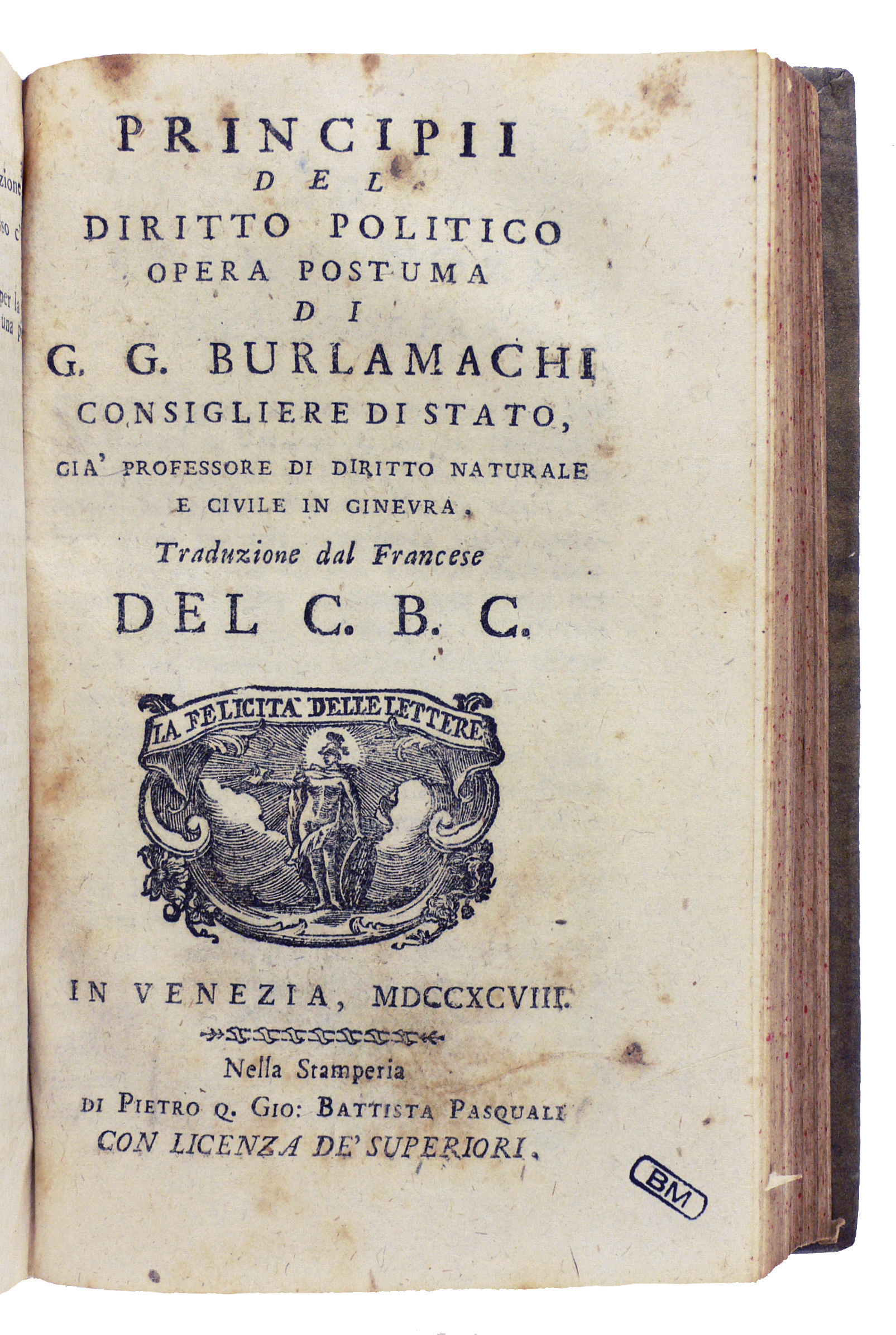
Principii del diritto politico, 1798 (Milano, Fondazione Mansutti).

Jean-Jacques Burlamaqui (French: [byʁlamaki]; 24 June or 13 July 1694 – 3 April 1748) was a Genevan legal and political theorist who popularised a number of ideas propounded by other thinkers.

== Life ==
Born in Geneva, Republic of Geneva, into a Calvinist family (descended from the wealthy 16th-century Italian merchant Francesco Burlamacchi of Lucca executed for his Republican sentiments) who had taken refuge religionis causa, he studied law and at 25 he was designated honorary professor of ethics and the law of nature at the university of Geneva. Before taking up the appointment, he travelled through France and England, and made the acquaintance of the most eminent writers of the period.

On his return he began to lecture and soon gained a wide reputation for the simplicity of his style and the precision of his views. He continued to lecture for 15 years, when he was compelled on ill health to resign. His fellow citizens at once elected him a member of the council of state, and he gained as high a reputation for his practical sagacity as he had for his theoretical knowledge. He died in Geneva.

== Works ==
His works were Principes du droit naturel (1747) and Principes du droit politique (1751). These have passed through many editions, and were very extensively used as textbooks. Burlamaqui's style is simple and clear, and his arrangement of the material good. His fundamental principle may be described as rational utilitarianism and represents a digest of the thoughts of like-minded theorists, particularly Richard Cumberland and Hugo Grotius.

Burlamaqui's treatise The Principles of Natural and Politic Law was translated into six languages (besides the original French) in 60 editions. His vision of constitutionalism had a major influence on the American Founding Fathers: "Early American thought also drew on ideas circulating on the Continent. The author who played the greatest part in transmitting those ideas over the Atlantic was the Swiss writer Jean-Jacques Burlamaqui, now almost forgotten, but at one time a best-selling author." For example, his understanding of checks and balances was much more sophisticated and practical than that of Montesquieu, in part because Burlamaqui's theory contained the seed of judicial review. He was frequently quoted or paraphrased, only sometimes attributed, in political sermons during the pre-revolutionary era. He was the first philosopher to articulate the quest for happiness as a natural right, a principle that Thomas Jefferson later restated in the Declaration of Independence.

Burlamaqui's description of European countries as forming "a kind of republic the members of which, independent but bound by common interest, come together to maintain order and liberty" is quoted by Michel Foucault in his 1978 lectures at the Collège de France in the context of a discussion of diplomacy and the law of nations.
