= Anne-Marie Piuz =

Swiss economic historian

- Born: 27 April 1923; Geneva, Switzerland
- Died: 10 September 2010 (aged 87); Collonge-Bellerive, Switzerland
- Education: Licence ès sciences sociales, University of Geneva (1946); Master's degree, UC Berkeley (1955); Doctorate, University of Geneva (1964)
- Occupation: Economic historian
- Known for: Research on preindustrial economies and societies

Anne-Marie Piuz (27 April 1923 – 10 September 2010) was a Swiss economic historian and professor at the University of Geneva. She specialized in the study of preindustrial economies and societies, with particular focus on early modern commerce.

== Early life and education ==
Piuz was born on 27 April 1923 in Geneva, the daughter of Jean Piuz, a farmer and café owner, and Julienne Mathieu. She was a citizen of Hermance. She obtained a licence ès sciences sociales from the University of Geneva in 1946, followed by a master's degree from the University of California, Berkeley in 1955. In 1964, she completed her doctorate in economic and social sciences at the University of Geneva with a thesis on commerce in Geneva in the 17th century.

== Academic career ==
Piuz began her academic career as an assistant to Professor Antony Babel at the University of Geneva from 1949 to 1964. She became a research fellow in 1962, was appointed extraordinary professor in 1969, and became full professor of economic history at the Faculty of Economic and Social Sciences in 1971, a position she held until her retirement in 1986.

== Research and contributions ==
Her research focused on preindustrial economies and societies. Throughout her career, Piuz maintained close contact with leading economic historians in Switzerland and abroad, including scholars in Lyon, Paris, Strasbourg, and Prato in Tuscany.

== Personal life ==
Piuz remained unmarried throughout her life. She died on 10 September 2010 in Collonge-Bellerive.

== Bibliography ==
=== Selected works ===
- "Du passé simple au passé composé", in Ego-histoires, dir. A. Cortat et al., 2003, pp. 401–416 (autobiography)
- L. Mottu-Weber, D. Zumkeller, ed., Mélanges d'histoire économique offerts au professeur Anne-Marie Piuz, 1989 (includes list of works)
