= Robert Gardelle =

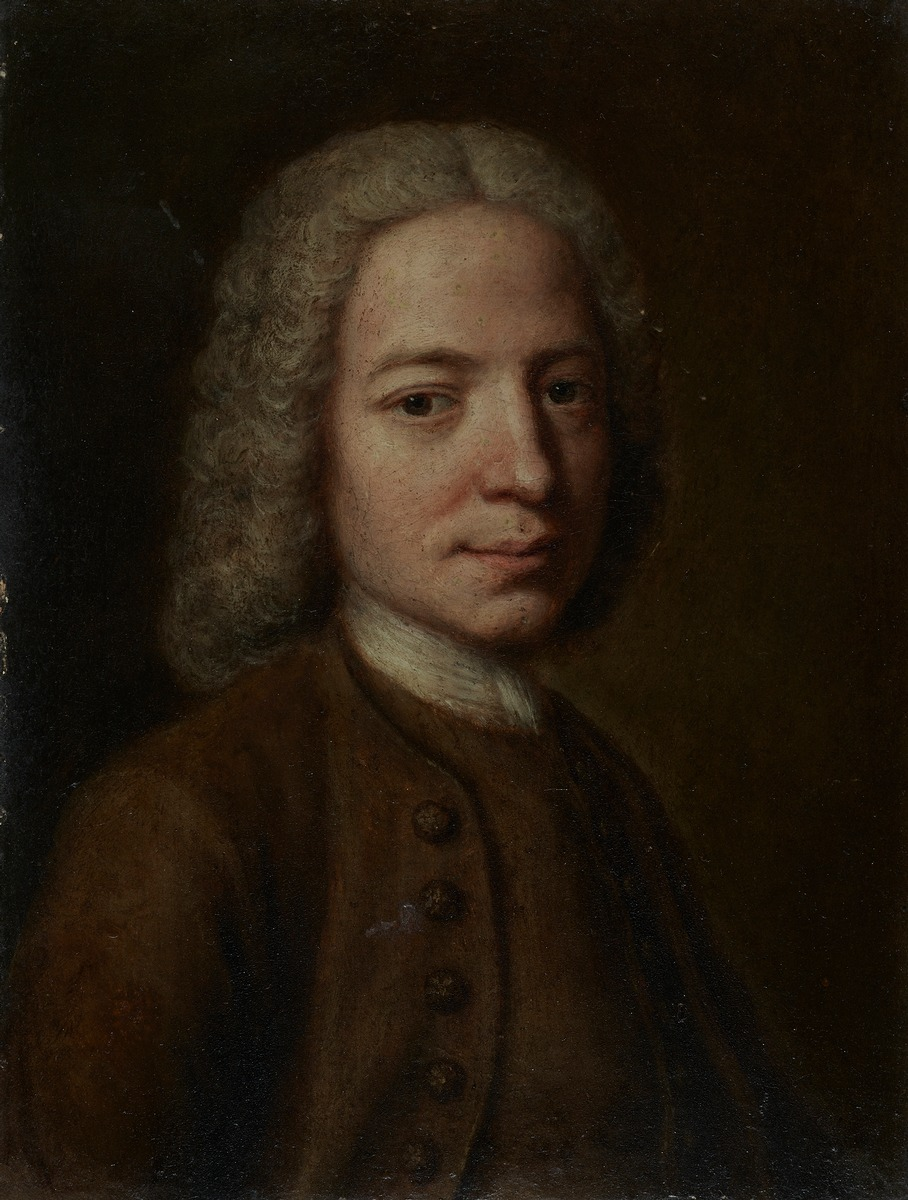
Self-portrait

Robert Gardelle (6 April 1682 – 7 March 1766) was a portrait and landscape painter, engraver and etcher from the Republic of Geneva. He studied under Nicolas de Largillière in Paris, where he distinguished himself as a portrait painter, producing also etchings of portraits and of views of Geneva. Gardelle is known for both the quantity of portraits he produced and the speed with which he produced them; Cambridge University Library noted during a 1978 exhibition that Gardelle was prolific and "often painted portraits in two or three days."

== Biography ==
Gardelle was born on 6 April 1682 in Geneva, Republic of Geneva, into a family of goldsmiths, painters, miniaturists, and enamellers. He was the son of Robert, a goldsmith, and Catherine Perrot, a great-granddaughter of the Huguenot minister Charles Perrot. Gardelle moved to Germany around 1702, likely after training as an artist in Geneva. He first settled in Kassel, under the patronage of Baron Gustav von Mardefeld, along with his older brother, Daniel, a miniaturist by trade. The brothers later stayed together in Berlin, where they executed a copy of a portrait of Charles XII of Sweden, which they donated to the Geneva Public Library. At the Library's request, they also copied the portrait of Erasmus painted by Hans Holbein the Younger upon their return to Kassel around 1710. Around the same time, Gardelle painted a portrait of the Landgrave of Hesse-Kassel on his own, probably from life.

In 1712, Gardelle married Sara Mussard in Geneva, with whom he had three children. Around 1714, he settled in Paris, where he studied for about a year in the studio of portrait painter Nicolas de Largillière, whose works he copied. There he met the miniaturist Jacques-Antoine Arlaud, a fellow Genevan. Returning to Geneva in 1715 and now a renowned portraitist, Gardelle was invited to work in Vaud, Neuchâtel, and Bern. He also painted landscapes, including four panoramic views of Geneva for Arlaud (who later bequeathed them to the Public Library), and engraved several of his own works. Gardelle died on 7 March 1766 in Geneva, following a bad fall, at the age of 84.

== Legacy ==
A student or collaborator in various workshops in Geneva, Germany, and Paris, Gardelle received what could be described as a cosmopolitan artistic education. Heavily influenced by the work of Nicolas de Largillière, he began producing medium-sized or life-size bust portraits in the style of the Parisian master as early as 1715. The Musée d'Art et d'Histoire in Geneva possesses a collection of portraits painted by Gardelle between 1717 and 1760–65. Gardelle is also known for the speed in with which worked, often taking two to three days to complete a life-size oil portrait, and the large number of commissions he accepted and executed. To this day, there is no catalogue raisonné of his work; as a result, Gardelle remains little known.

== Selected works ==
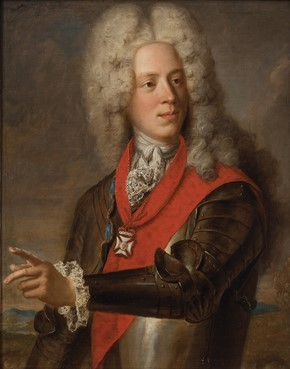
Albrecht Friedrich von Erlach, 1721

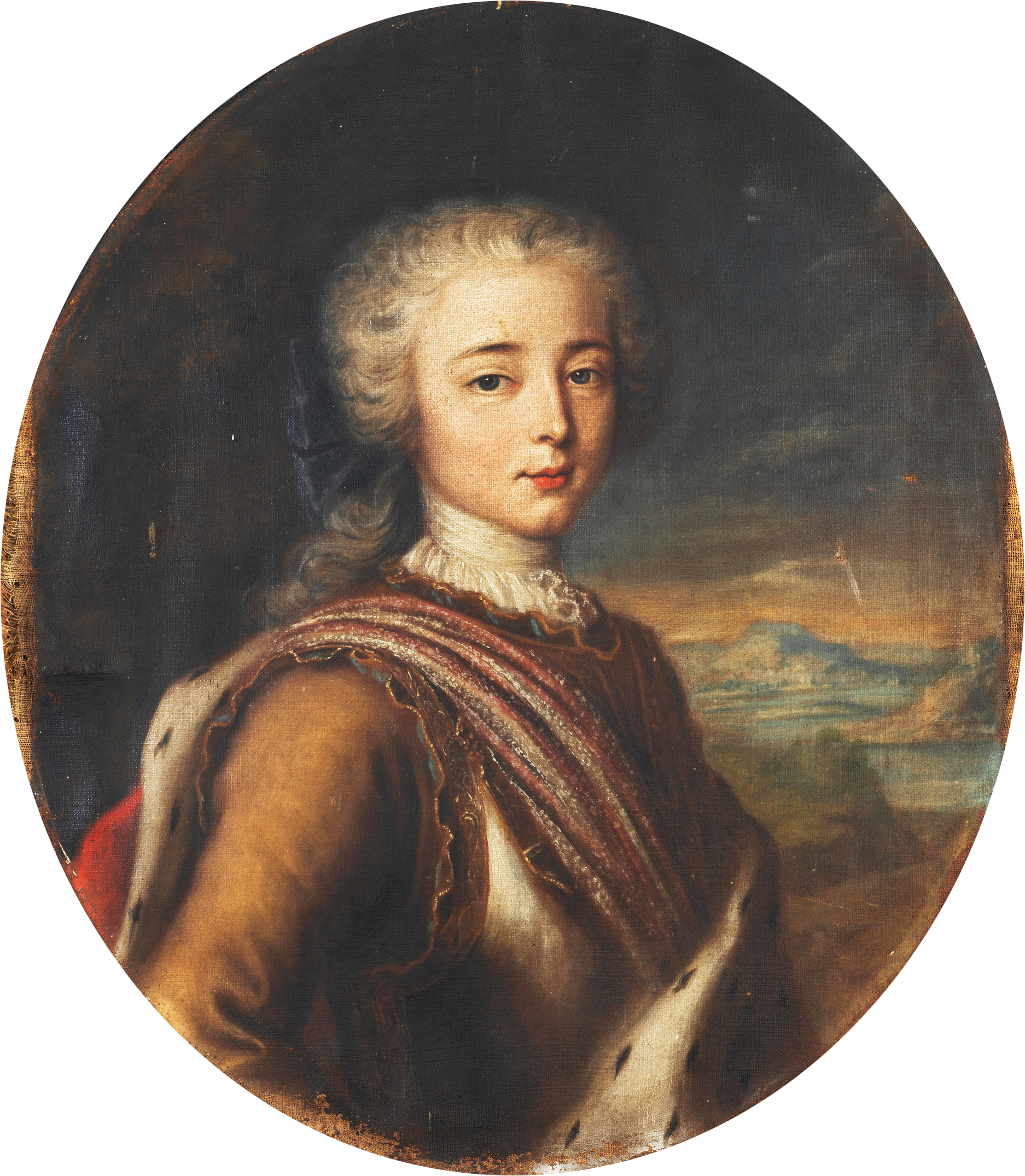
Frederick II of Hesse-Kassel, 1734

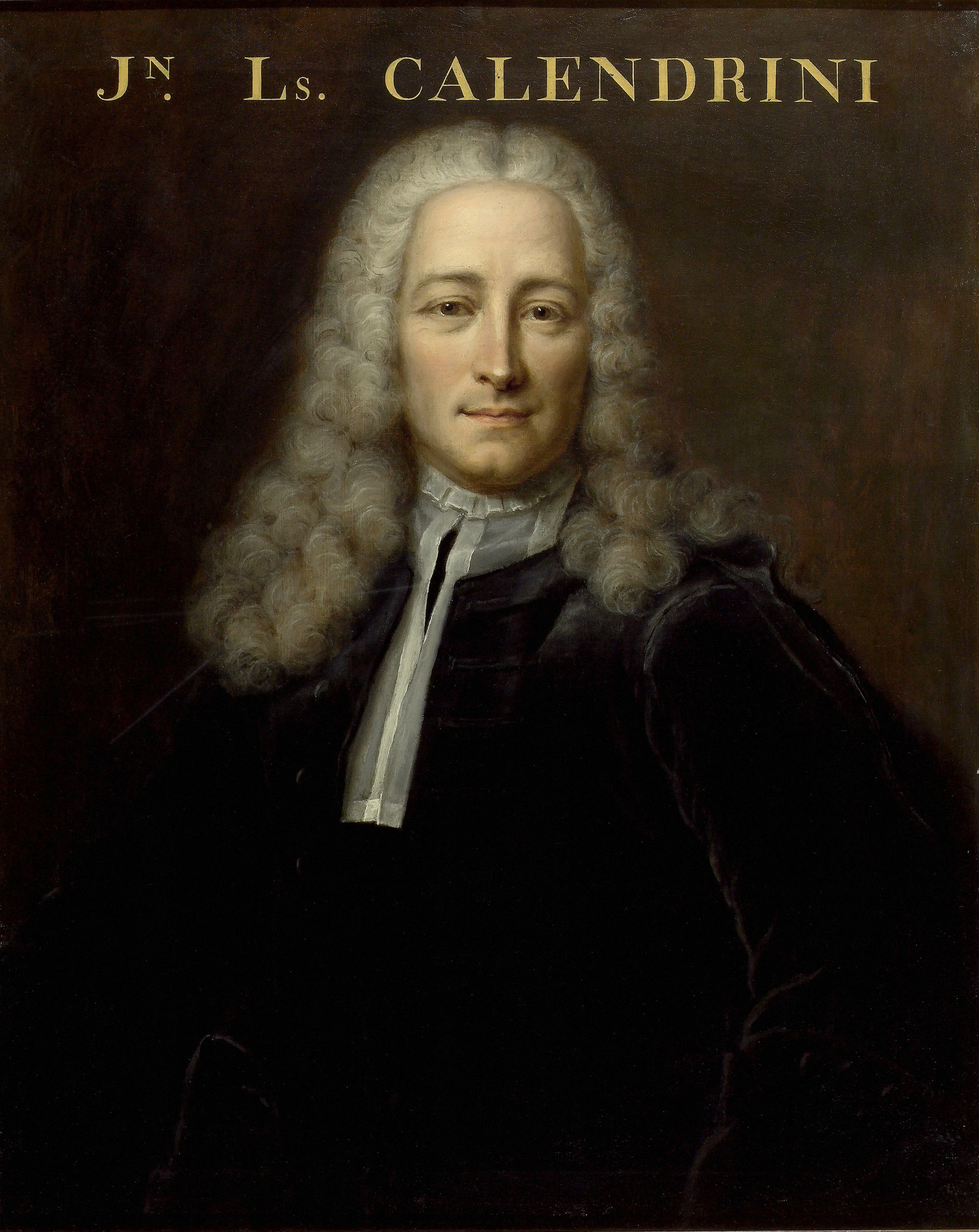
Jean-Louis Calandrini, c. 1760

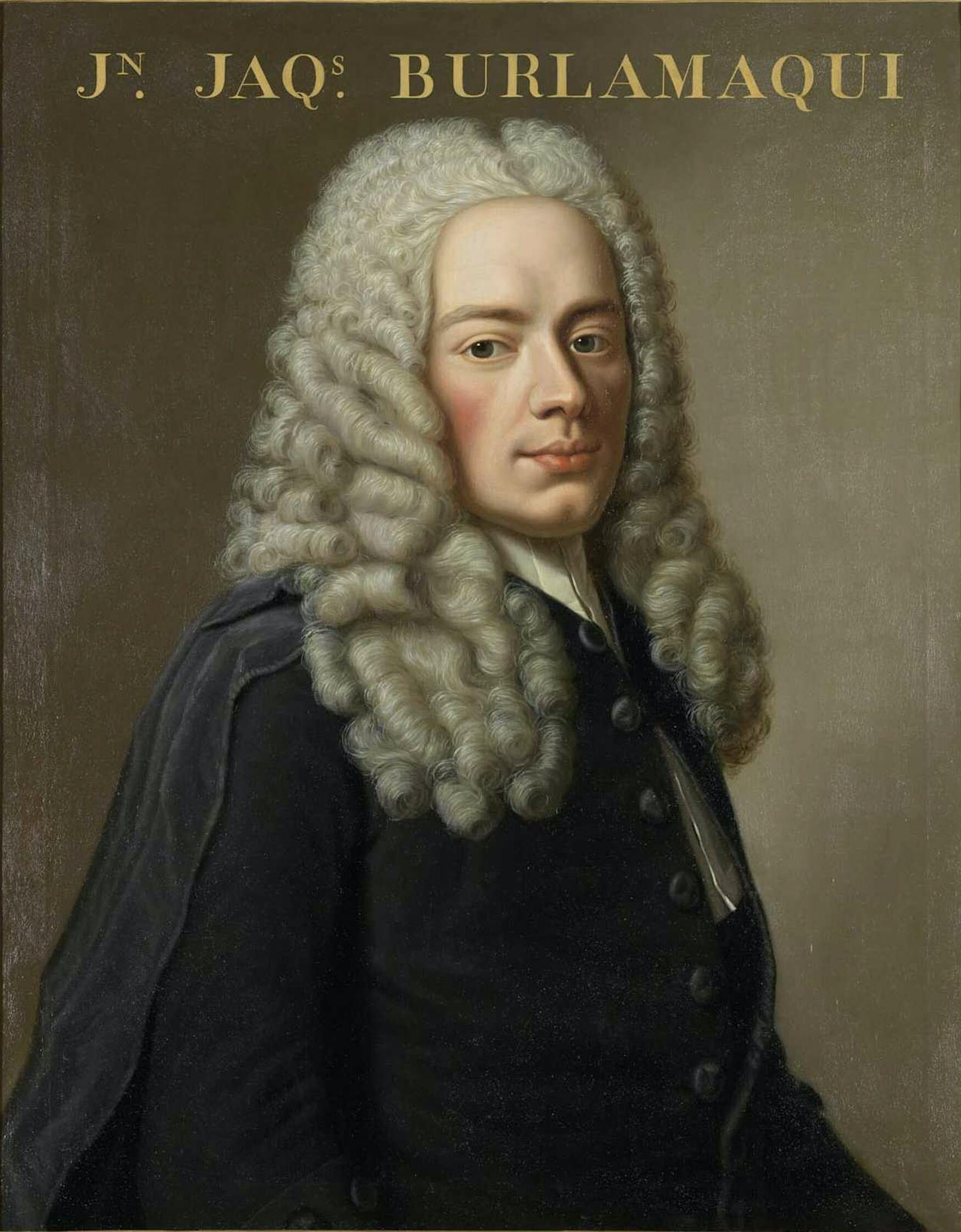
Jean-Jacques Burlamaqui, c. 1760

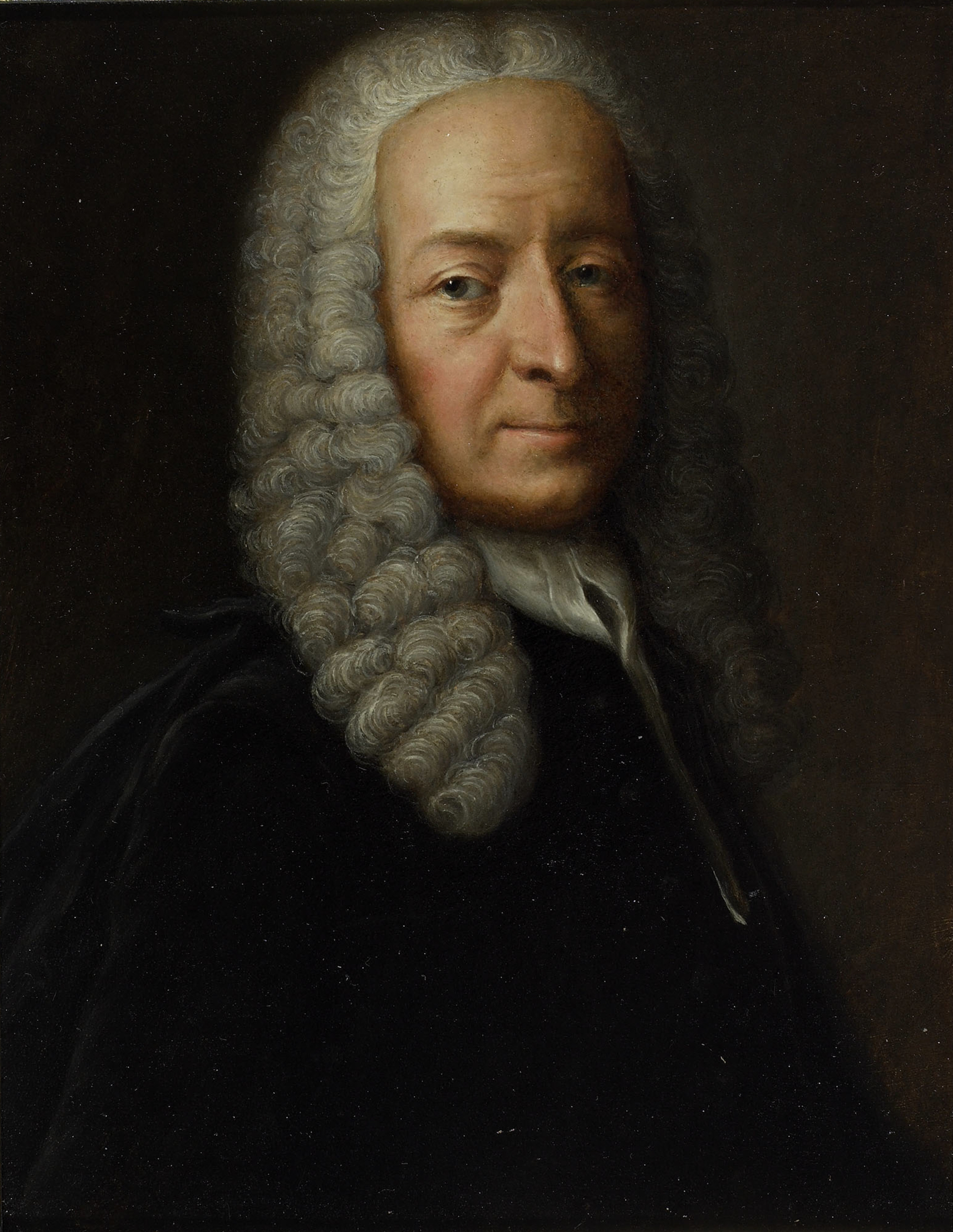
Michel Lullin de Châteauvieux

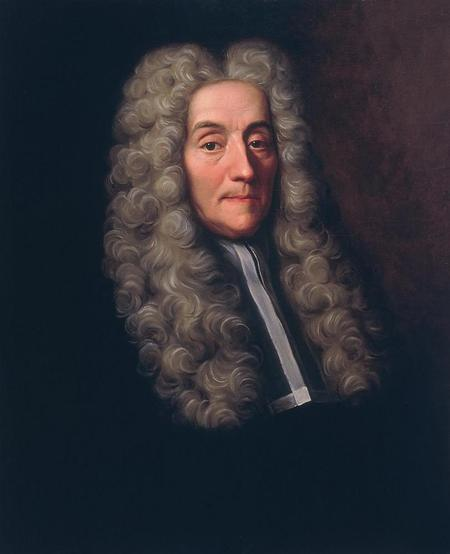
Jean-Robert Chouet

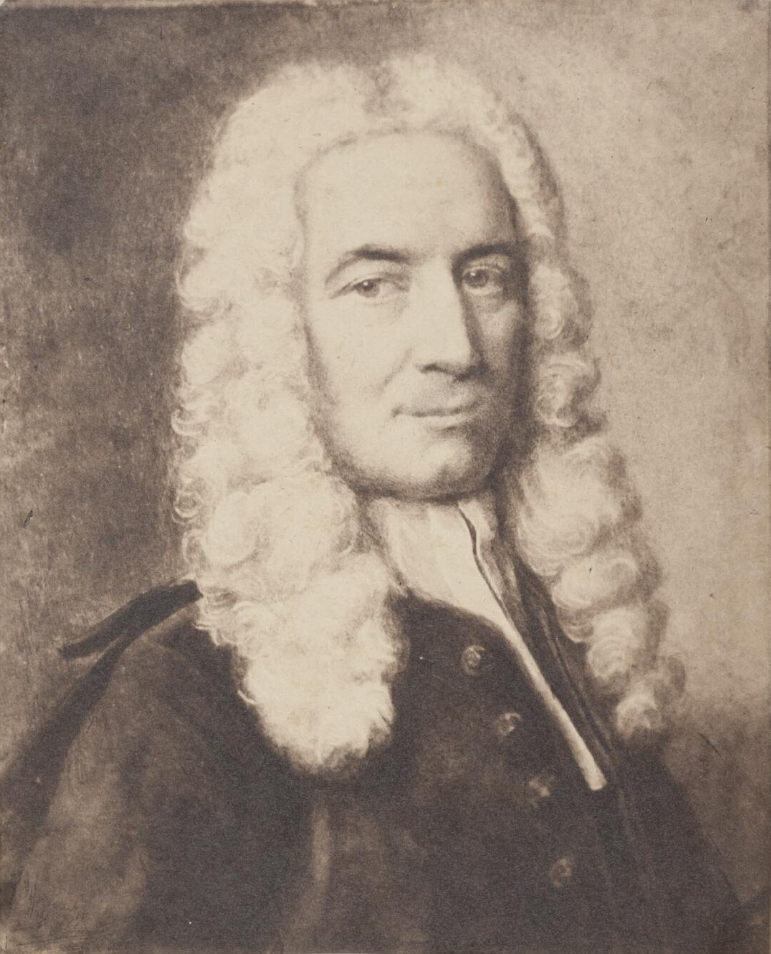
Pierre Fatio

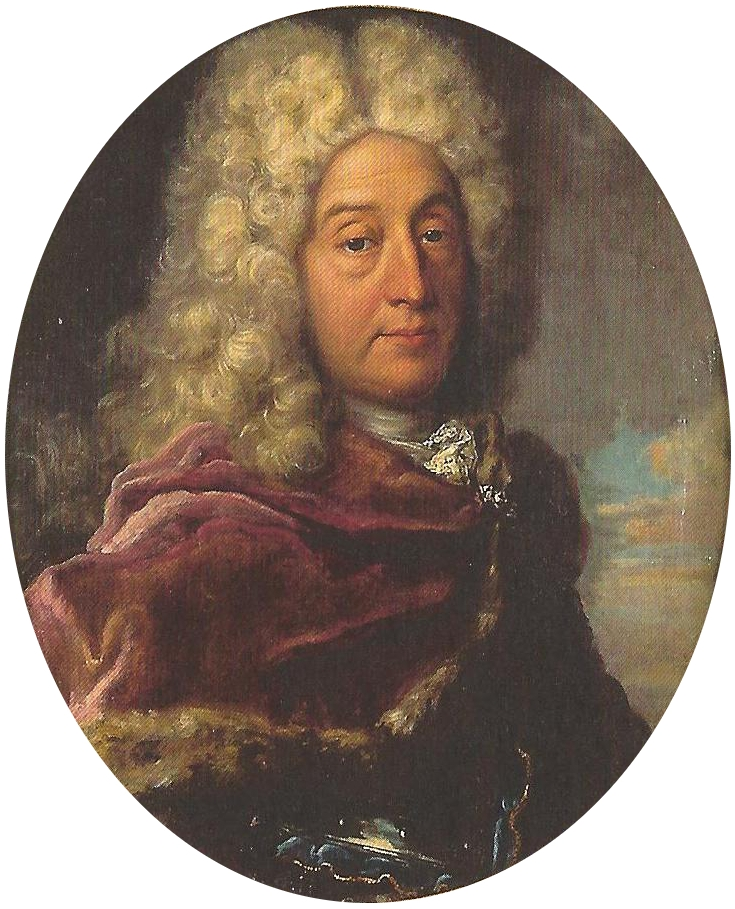
Vinzenz Stürler

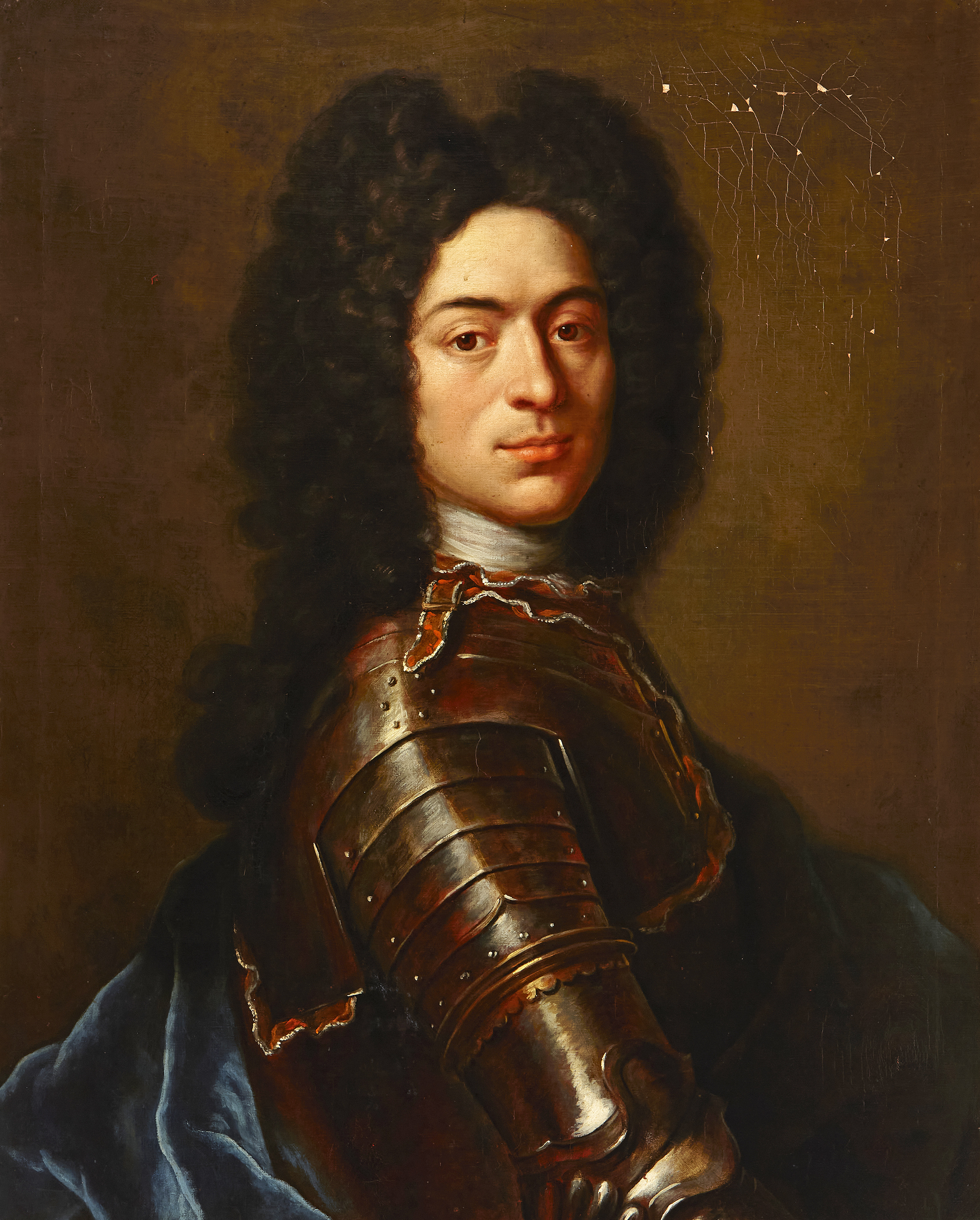
Samuel Frisching III
