= David Derodon =

French philosopher and theologian

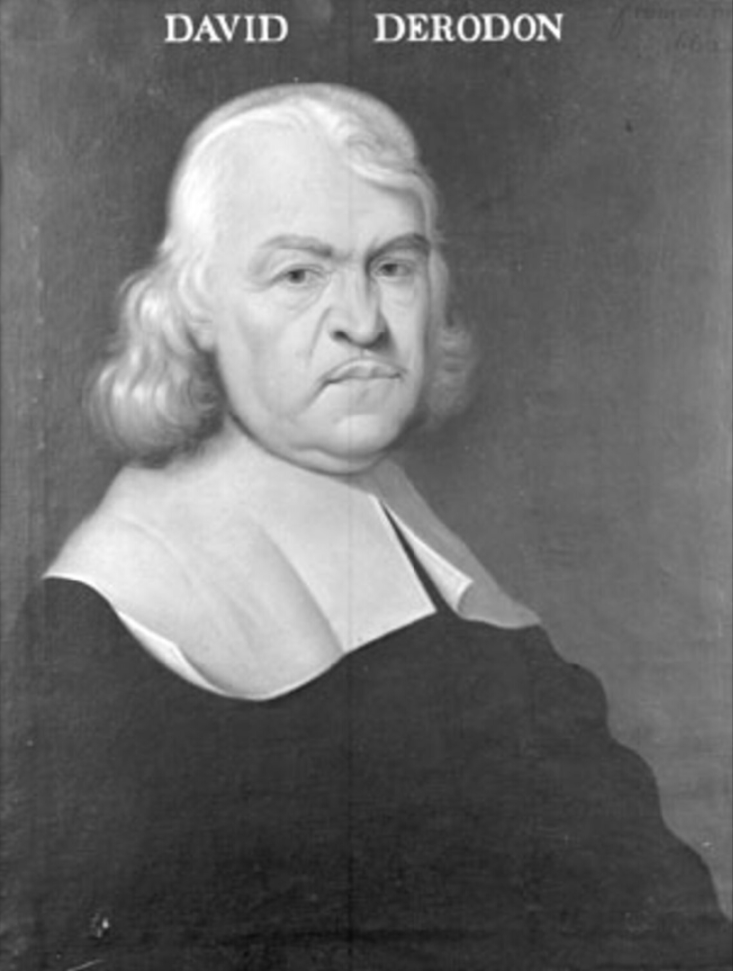
Portrait at the Bibliothèque de Genève

David de Rodon (also simply Derodon; c. 1600 – 1664) was a French Calvinist theologian and philosopher.

== Biography ==
Derodon was born at Die, in the Dauphiné. He had the reputation of being one of the most eminent logicians of his time. His knowledge of philosophy was both extensive and profound. He taught philosophy at Orange, at Nîmes, and at Geneva. He inclined to the doctrines of Gassendi rather than to those of the Cartesian philosophy. He had frequent discussions with the followers of Descartes. He kept up a close correspondence with many learned men of his time, particularly with Galileo and Descartes.

We find from his writings, that he admitted the truth of Aristotle's general principles, and made them the foundation of his public lectures on philosophy. Matter and form, the different principles of causation, the division of the soul into the vegetable, the sensitive, and the rational, may all be found in the speculations of Derodon. His great delight lay, however, in argumentation. His agreement with any system was only conditional and formal; he always had innumerable objections to every thing he seemed to acquiesce in. Hence his contention with the predicaments of Aristotle; his attempted refutation of the term universal; and the contrasts he instituted between the whole system of the Stagirite, and the philosophical opinions of Plato, Democritus, Epicurus, and many other distinguished men of antiquity.

Derodon took great delight in discussions on the nature of genus and species, and on those curious and puzzling questions which go under the name of the Cross of Logicians. The following are some of the debatable points. "The term genus cannot be defined, for the definition must necessarily involve the thing to be defined. Genus is an individual, for it is numerically one. Genus is a species; but species is not a genus; therefore, species is more general than genus."

Derodon enters into long discussions on the nature of being, and the peculiar province of reason. His writings are both ill-arranged and obscure. In the course of his disquisitions on these points, we find the author zealously attached to the old maxim, that there is nothing in the understanding which was not first in the senses. This he considers as a fundamental principle in all rational systems of speculative philosophy.

His metaphysics were, however, of a scholastic nature, and present a curious compound from the speculations of the Arabian philosophers, the early Scholastic divines, and some of the writers among the Dominicans of Spain.

He wrote a considerable number of works against the doctrines of the Roman Catholic Church, which had a wide circulation, and were translated into several foreign languages. Among them were Quatre raisons pour lesquelles on doit quitter la R. P. R. (Paris, 1631); Quatre raisons qui traitent de l'eucharistie, du purgatoire, du péché originel et de la prédestination (1662), and Le Tombeau de la Messe (Geneva, 1654), a translation of which was issued at London in 1673, with this rather premature title, The Funeral of the Mass, or the Mass Dead and Buried without Hope of Resurrection. The latter book was burned on 6 March 1063 by the public executioner, the author exiled, and the bookseller sentenced to a fine of 1000 livres, the loss of his license, and ten years exile. This last work procured his banishment from France, upon which he withdrew to Geneva.

He is also the author of several works on philosophical subjects, and against the atheists amongst which may be mentioned, Dispute de la Messe, La Lumière de la raison opposée aux ténèbres de l'impiété, De Existentia Dei, Logica Restituta. His complete works were collected into two volumes, and published soon after his death (Derodonis Opera Omnia, Geneva, 1664 and 1669, 2 vols.; the first volume contains the philosophical, and the second the theological writings).

He died in Geneva in 1664.

== Sources ==
- John McClintock, James Strong, Cyclopaedia of Biblical, theological, and ecclesiastical literature, Volume 2, Harper, 1868, p. 750.
- Robert Blakey, History of the philosophy of mind: embracing the opinions of all writers on mental science from the earliest period to the present time, Volume 2, Trelawney Wm. Saunders, 1848, pp. 323–5.
