= Pictet =

Pictet may refer to:

== Surname ==
- Adolphe Pictet (1799–1875), Swiss linguist
- Amé Pictet (1857–1937), Swiss chemist
- Amédée-Pierre-Jules Pictet de Sergy (1795–1888), Swiss politician and historian
- Benedict Pictet (1655–1724), Genevan theologian
- Charles Pictet de Rochemont (1755–1824), Swiss politician
- Ernest Pictet (1829–1909), Swiss banker and politician
- Francis Pictet (born 1866), Australian cricketer
- François Jules Pictet de la Rive (1809–1872), Swiss zoologist and palaeontologist
- Gustave Pictet (1827–1900), Swiss lawyer, judge and politician
- Jean Pictet (1914–2002), Swiss citizen, jurist, legal practitioner, honorary doctorate
- Marc-Auguste Pictet (1752–1825), Swiss physicist
- Marion MacMillan Pictet, American heiress
- Raoul Pictet (1846–1929), Swiss physicist, one of the first two people to liquefy oxygen

== Other uses ==
- Pictet (crater), crater on the Moon, named after Marc-Auguste Pictet
- Pictet-Gams isoquinoline synthesis, variation on the Bischler–Napieralski reaction producing Isoquinoline
- Pictet-Hubert reaction, producing Phenanthridine from the 2-aminobiphenyl – formaldehyde adduct and zinc chloride
- Pictet–Spengler reaction, chemical reaction in which a β-arylethylamine is heated in the presence of an aldehyde and acid
- The Pictet Group, Swiss private bank

== See also ==
- Pictet family
- Pic-Pic, Piccard & Pictet, Swiss automobile
- LeRoy and Pictet, co-operative company which recruited Germans to settle in Russia in the 18th century
- Prix Pictet (Pictet prize), international award in photography and sustainability
- Pictetia
