= Pictet family =

Swiss patrician family

Pictet
- Patrician family
- De sinople à un mur non crenelé d’argent, maçonné de sable, accompagné en chef d’un lion naissant d’or, mouvant du mur.
- Country: Switzerland
- Current region: Canton of Geneva
- Origin: Neydens, Savoy
- Founded: 1474 (citizenship in Geneva)
- Founder: Pierre Pictet
- Traditions: Calvinism
- Motto: Sustine et Abstine, or Bien faire et laisser dire ("Sustain and Abstain" / "Do well and let them talk")
- Website: https://archivesfamillepictet.ch

The Pictet family is a family from Geneva, Switzerland. Originally from the town of Neydens, Savoy (now Haute-Savoie, France), they joined the bourgeoisie of Geneva in 1474. Over the following centuries, the Pictet family played a significant role in the political, religious, scientific, military and economic life of Geneva and Switzerland.

Since the first half of the 17^{th} century, the Pictet family has been divided into three distinct branches: the elder branch (now extinct), the middle branch and the youngest branch, with the latter the most numerous today.

The most illustrious members of the Pictet family include Charles Pictet de Rochemont (1755-1824), who negotiated the present-day borders of the canton of Geneva and the recognition of Switzerland's perpetual neutrality, as well as his brother Marc-Auguste Pictet (1752-1825), a great scientific and intellectual figure in whose honor the name Pictet was given to one of the Moon's craters. Amé Pictet (1857-1937), a chemist, gave his name to the Pictet-Spengler reaction, while Raoul Pictet (1846-1929) was the first to liquefy oxygen in 1878. Lucien Pictet (1864-1928), an engineer, gave half of his surname to the Pic-Pic automobiles and Jean (1914-2002), his son, was one of the architects of the four Geneva Conventions of 1949.

Over the centuries, many members of the family have served on the Small Council of Geneva or as State Councillors, including twelve syndics (mayors) under the old Republic of Geneva. The family includes many professors who have taught at the University of Geneva (formerly Academy of Geneva), particularly in theology, law, and natural sciences.

Today, the Pictet family is directly associated with the Pictet Group, one of the largest private banks in Switzerland, chiefly managed since 1841 by members of its youngest branch. Lastly, the family has a foundation dedicated to preserving the family archives, which can serve as a documentary base for researchers, exhibitions, or the publication of works dedicated to the history of the great Swiss families.

== Origins ==
The Pictet family's earliest known ancestors were farmers who owned five hectares of land in Neydens, starting in 1344. It is worth noting that the Pictet surname was originally written as Pitet or Pittet: the Pictet spelling appeared in the 15^{th} century, with the 'c' used to mark the double 't'. While the Pictet spelling became permanently established within the family, the pronunciation without the 'c' remained widespread in Geneva for a long time and is still occasionally used.^{,} However, early sources attest to the fact that family members systematically signed themselves as 'Pictet' as early as the 16^{th} century.

The first ancestor to make a significant mark on the family history is Pierre Pictet, who joined the bourgeoisie of Geneva on October 14, 1474, marking the beginning of the family's social ascent in the city. This distinguishes them from the Huguenot or Italian families who gained bourgeois status after the Reformation. The first urban generations of the family settled in the suburb of Saint-Gervais in the early 16^{th} century, engaging in craft-related professions. In 1575, Ami Pictet (notary public), great-great-grandson of Pierre Pictet, contributed to this rise by becoming the first member of the Pictet family to be elected syndic (mayor) of the Republic of Geneva, marking the family's entry into Geneva's political sphere.

At the beginning of the 17^{th} century, the family divided into three branches, each stemming from a descendant of Jaques Pictet (1576-1629): his son André (1609-1669) founded the elder branch (now extinct), Jérémie (1613-1669) founded the middle branch, and his youngest son Pierre (1626-1690) founded the youngest branch. Nevertheless, each branch has distinguished itself over the centuries in various fields, notably in politics, the military, economics, and religion. Over the centuries, the family remained established in the Geneva area, where it amassed substantial holdings, often through marriage alliances, mainly on the right bank of Lake Geneva and along the Rhône (notably in Pregny-Chambésy, Saconnex, Troinex and Sergy in the Pays de Gex).

== Eldest branch ==
The eldest branch of the family descends from the syndic André Pictet (1609-1669). Notable members include political figures, as well as a leading religious figure, Bénédict Pictet. This branch has been extinct since 1876.

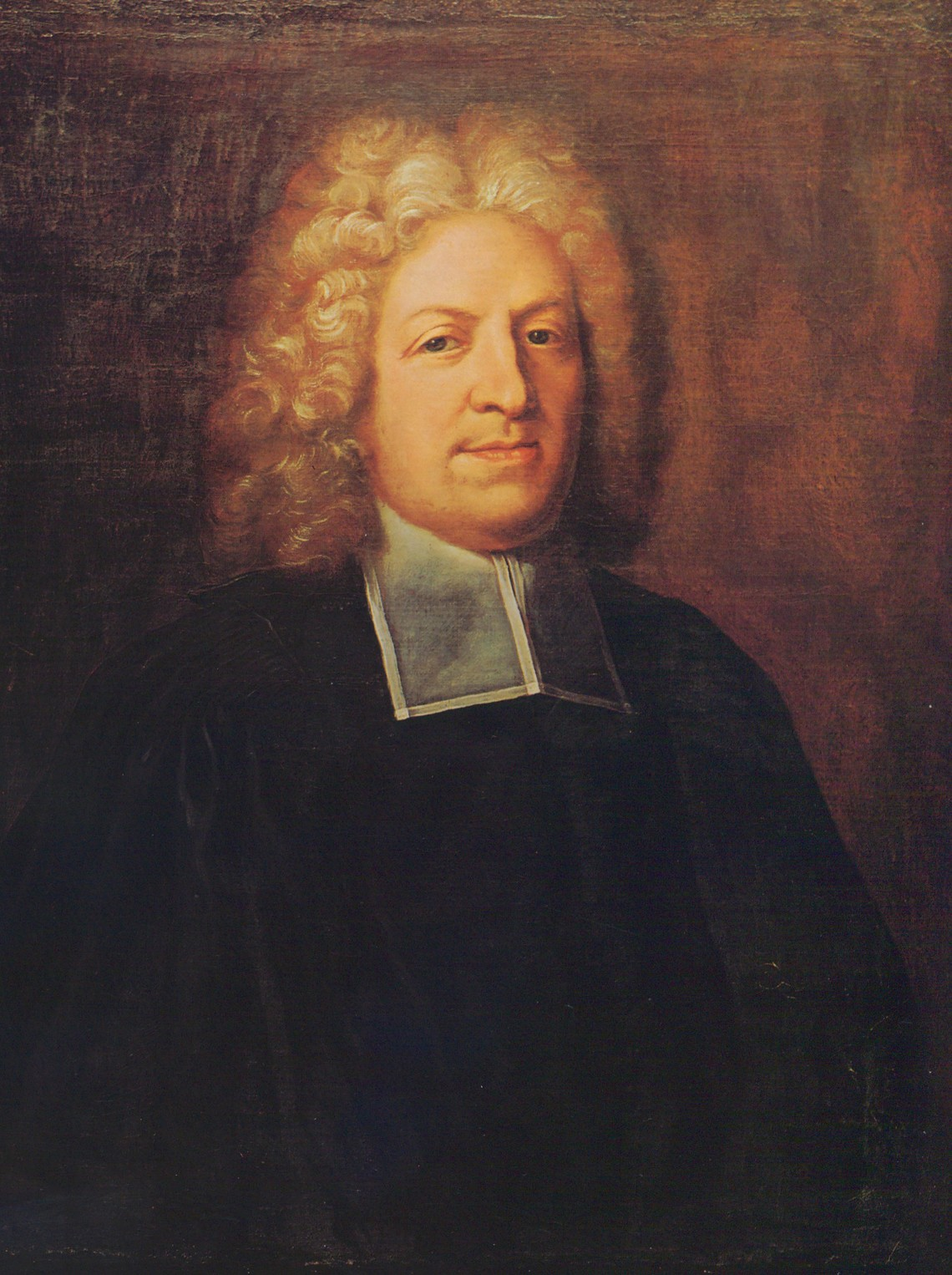
Bénédict Pictet (1655‑1724) in 1720.

- Bénédict Pictet (1655-1724), son of André Pictet, the founder of the eldest branch, was an important Genevan pastor and theologian. Starting in 1686, he taught theology at the Academy of Geneva, where he served as rector twice. A major figure in Geneva Protestantism, he led several civil and ecclesiastical institutions, and was a member of the Berlin Academy of Sciences. An advocate of Reformed orthodoxy open to Cartesian philosophy, he played a central role in Geneva's liturgical reforms. A prolific author, he published widely circulated theological and moral treatises, as well as sermons and hymns.
- Catherine Pictet (1726-1795), daughter of Councillor and Secretary of State Isaac Pictet (1693-1769), and close friend of the mother of Albert Gallatin (1761-1849), whom she raised when he became an orphan. Emigrating to the United States at the age of 18, Gallatin embarked on a brilliant political, diplomatic, and banking career that culminated in his appointment as Secretary of the Treasury under President Thomas Jefferson. Albert wrote in 1844, "You are not unaware of the great obligations I have towards Catherine Pictet, your father's aunt, who raised us both (..)." I owe what I am worth and the success of the career I've been thrust into to her.".
- François Pierre Pictet (1728-1798), known as 'the Giant', grandson of Bénédict, studied law in Geneva before becoming a lawyer in 1752. He became close to Voltaire during the years the latter spent in the Geneva region. In 1761, he settled in Saint Petersburg, where he joined the circle of Catherine II. Through his connections, he initiated correspondence between the philosopher and the empress. His path led him to become an informant for the French Embassy in Russia and to recruit settlers to populate Kazan and Saratov. Involved in a smuggling affair, he was forced to leave Russia in 1776 and settled in Paris. An anti-revolutionary, he emigrated to London, then Reading and Bern, before returning to Geneva, where he died.

== Middle branch ==
Also known as the 'second branch', it descends from Jérémie Pictet (1613-1669). This branch has provided the family with some of its most notable political, diplomatic, and scientific figures. This branch has experienced a gradual demographic decline since the 19^{th} century, but still exists today.

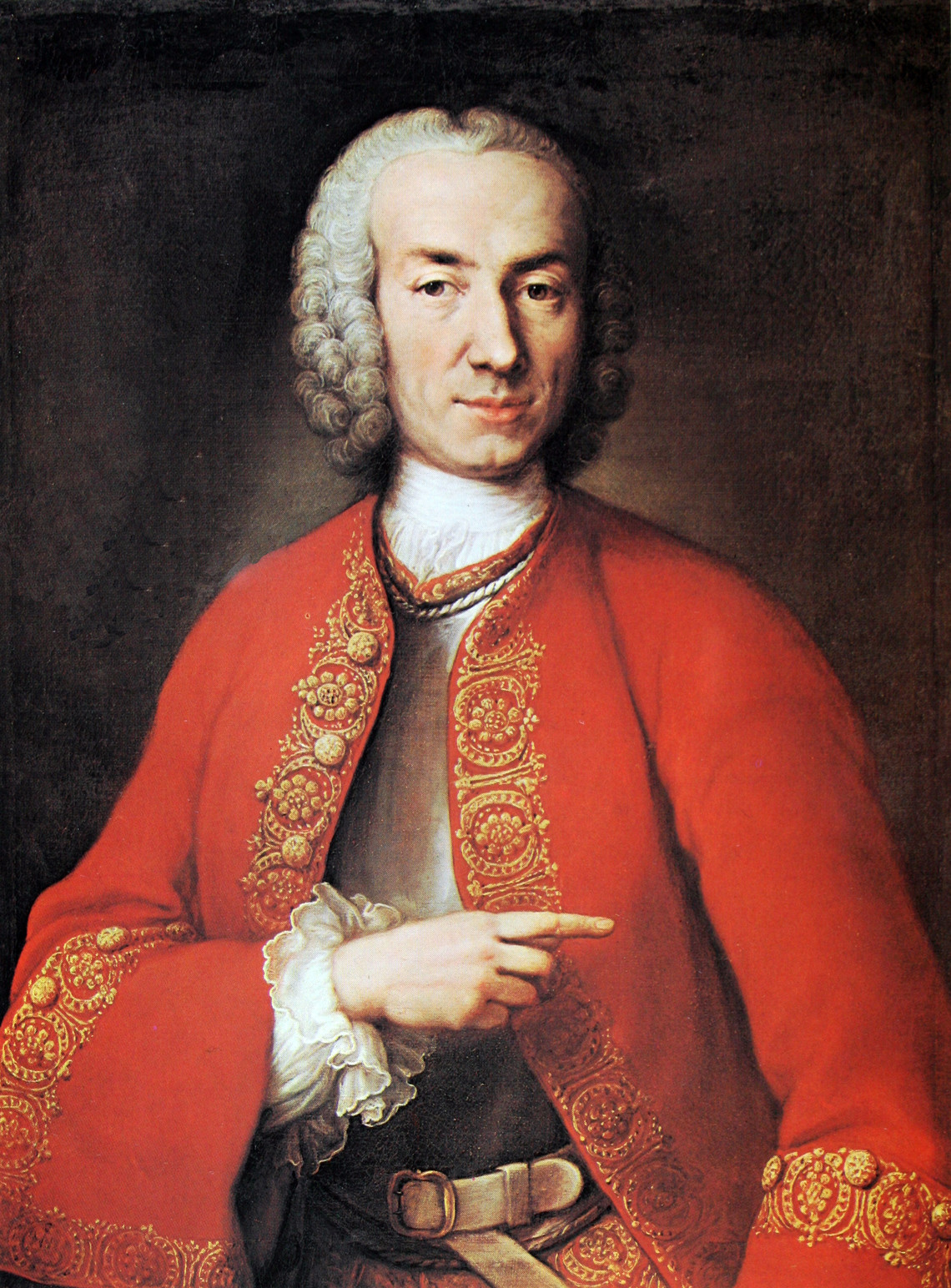
Jacques Pictet-Thellusson (1705‑1786), around 1740.

- Jacques Pictet-Thellusson (1705-1786) pursued a military career as an officer in the service of the Kingdom of Piedmont-Sardinia, where he achieved the rank of lieutenant-general. He later represented King Charles Emmanuel III, who appointed him as a count in 1756. Heir to the Reposoir estate in Pregny-Chambésy, he had a mansion built there, which remains the property of the family to this day. He had three sons: Isaac, Louis, and Marc-Louis.
- Charlotte Pictet (1734-1766) lived in the property her father built near the 'Délices', the estate where the famous French philosopher resided, and with whom she formed a friendship. Disturbed by this proximity and to preserve his peace, Voltaire planted chestnut trees between the properties, which he dubbed "cache-Pictet" (the Pictet screen). The expression gained unexpected popularity thanks to Stendhal, who cited it in his Memories of a tourist, published in 1854. In 1757, Charlotte married Samuel Constant from Vaud, the future uncle of the writer and politician Benjamin Constant. Having closely followed the preparations, Voltaire wrote about the wedding: "We are marrying one of General Constant's sons to the beautiful Miss Pictet and uniting Lausanne with Geneva".
- Isaac Pictet de Pregny (1746-1823), eldest son of Jacques Pictet-Thellusson, turned to politics and diplomacy at an early age, after studying at the Academy of Geneva. As a correspondent for foreign powers (notably the King of Sardinia) and close to European diplomatic circles, he quickly rose to the highest offices. The Revolution of 1792 abruptly stripped him of his positions, his wealth, and his wife, forcing him into a prolonged retirement. He dedicated these years to managing and enhancing his Reposoir estate, as well as to historical and genealogical research. During the Restoration, he regained a central role in Geneva's political life and died while serving as syndic. From his first marriage to Lucrèce Lullin, Isaac Pictet had three children: Gabriel, who died in infancy, Jacques (known as James), and Louis, who survived him and became his heir; his second marriage to Julie-Madeleine Bertrand was childless.

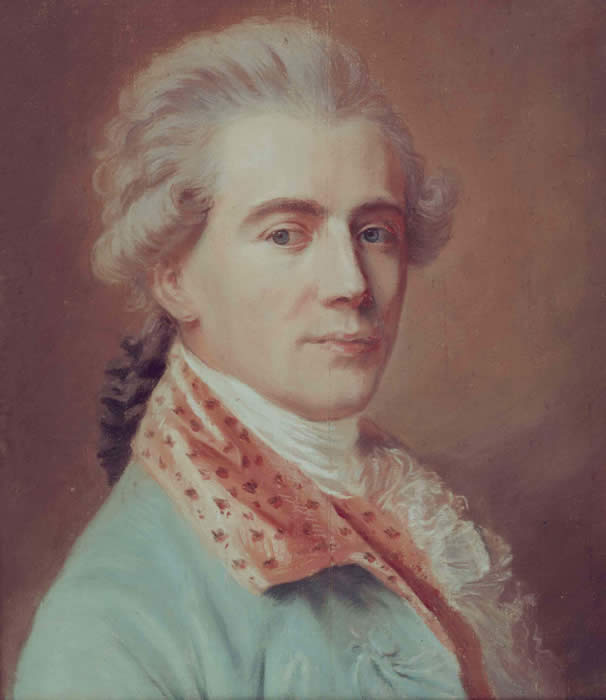
Louis Pictet du Bengale (1747-1823), around 1780.

- Louis Pictet, known as "Pictet of Bengal" (1747-1823), the second son of Jacques Pictet-Thellusson, trained in commerce in England before entering the service of the British East India Company. Sent to Bengal, he stayed there for nearly nine years, holding administrative positions and managing the trading post at Cossimbazar, which enabled him to amass a considerable fortune. Returning to Europe for health reasons, he settled in Geneva, then in the Vaud region during the French Revolution.
- Marc-Auguste Pictet (1752-1825), son of Charles Pictet, was one of Geneva's leading scientific and intellectual figures. An astronomer, physicist, naturalist, and cartographer, he taught physics at the Academy of Geneva for nearly forty years. A colleague and friend of Horace-Bénédict de Saussure, he made a vital contribution to alpine cartography and the beginnings of modern meteorology. Co-founder and Scientific Director of the Geneva-based periodical Bibliothèque Britannique, he played a major role in bridging the gap between English science and French-speaking Europe.^{,} A dignitary of the Napoleonic Empire, while remaining deeply attached to Geneva, he presided over the Société des Arts for many years and established a reputation as a scholar, educator, and mediator of international influence.
- Charles Pictet de Rochemont (1755–1824), son of Charles Pictet and brother of Marc-Auguste, is a major figure in Geneva and Swiss history, considered one of the founding fathers of the nation. Having trained for a military career, he found his true calling as a publicist and agronomist. Settling in Lancy, he became a pioneer in merino breeding, the development of modern agriculture, and the wool industry, while disseminating British innovations widely through his publications, notably in the Bibliothèque Britannique. A latecomer to public life, he played a decisive role during the Restoration, representing Geneva and then the Swiss Confederation at the congresses of Paris and Vienna. His diplomatic efforts ensured Geneva's integration into Switzerland and international recognition of Switzerland's perpetual neutrality (1815). He also negotiated the Treaty of Turin (1816), which finalized the cession of the Sardinian municipalities to the canton.
- Adélaïde Sara Pictet de Rochemont (1767-1830), Charles's wife, joined her name to his according to the Genevan custom of the time. In addition to managing the model farm they owned in Lancy, where the latest agricultural innovations were used, she and her husband established a school for local children. A park is now dedicated to her in the Pont-Rouge district of Lancy.^{,}
- James Pictet-Menet (1777-1816), eldest son of Isaac Pictet de Pregny, pursued a military career in the service of the Sardinian and then French armies during the wars of the Revolution and the Empire. Having enlisted as a teenager, he participated in most of the major European campaigns, and was present at Austerlitz, Wagram, in Spain, in Russia and during the battles of 1813-1814, and distinguished himself by his courage, being seriously wounded several times. Captain in the Imperial Guard Dragoons, awarded the Légion d'Honneur and made a Knight of the Empire after the Russian campaign. Severely wounded during the French campaign in 1814, he married Mary Menet that same year, despite his father's initial reluctance, and settled in Sécheron. Elected as a member of Geneva's Representative Council during the Restoration, he died from his wounds in 1816, at the age of thirty-nine, without descendants.

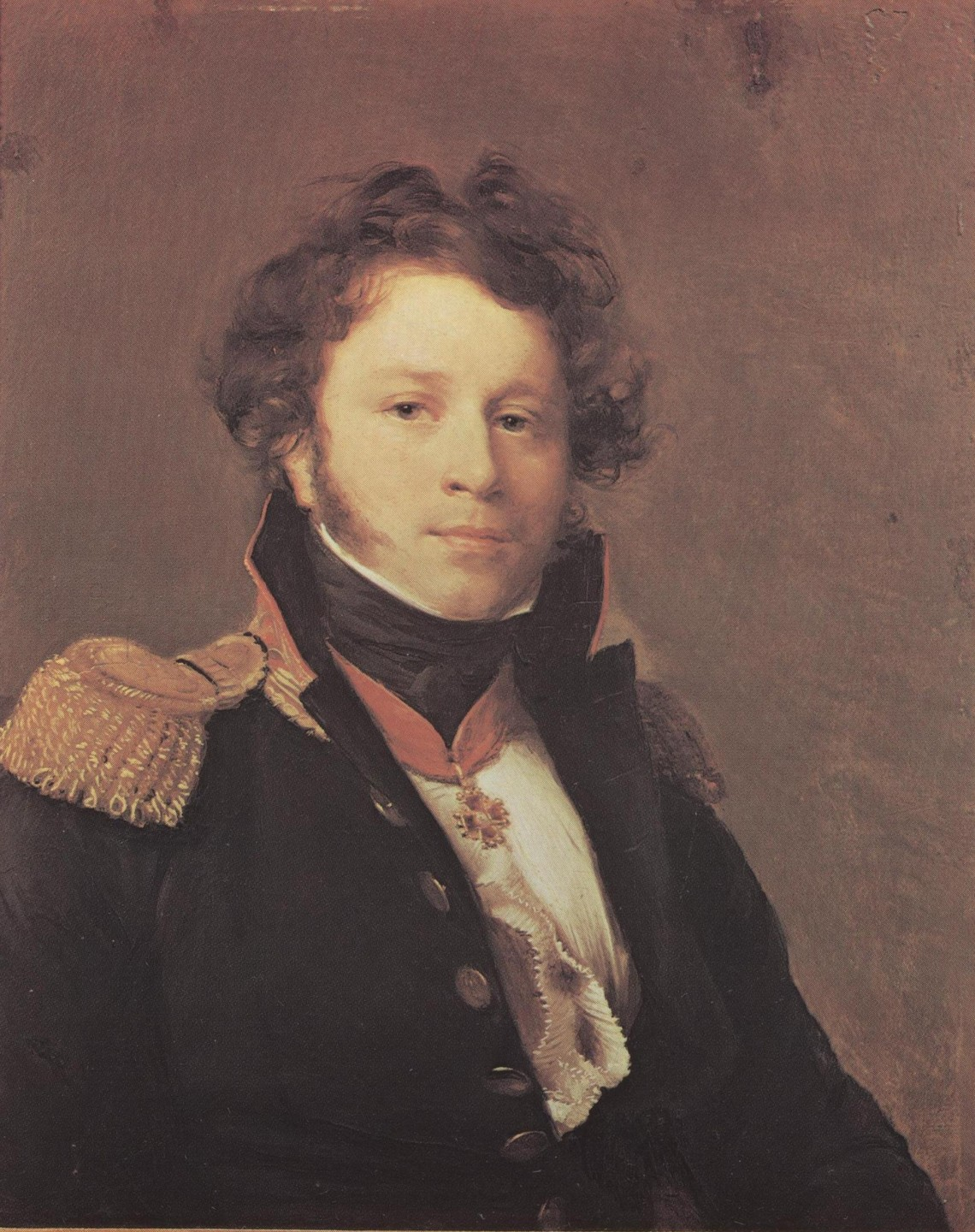
Charles-René Pictet de Rochemont (1787-1856), in 1818

- Louis Pictet-Achard (1778-1852), son of Isaac Pictet de Pregny and brother of James, pursued a military career in the service of Prussia, for whom he fought most notably in the 1806 campaign against Napoleon. After the capitulation of the Prussian army, he returned to Geneva and dedicated himself to managing his family estate, the Reposoir in Pregny. Married late to Victoire Achard, he has no direct descendants. Louis continued his travels in Europe, particularly in Prussia, which he considered his second home. He died in Lübeck in 1852.
- Charles-René Pictet de Rochemont (1787-1856), the eldest son of Charles Pictet de Rochemont, pursued a career like his father's, combining agronomy, diplomacy, and public service. From a young age, he played an active role in establishing the sheep farms founded by his father in the Russian Empire, particularly in the Odessa region, where he spent several years managing large-scale operations for breeding merino sheep. From the time of the Restoration, Charles-René turned his focus to diplomacy. He was an attaché to the Duke of Richelieu and later served the Kingdom of Bavaria, before his appointment as a legation counselor, chamberlain, and chargé d'affaires in Paris, a position he held from 1816 to 1825. He subsequently retired to Geneva, where he led a distinguished life, serving for many years on the Representative Council, as mayor of Lancy, and participating in the Genevan Consistory. As a landowner, he managed his Geneva estates and attempted to sustain the Russian farms, which were ultimately liquidated at a loss. A man committed to the traditional social order, sensitive to honors and titles, he added the name Rochemont to his own in 1835 and was decorated by the Kingdom of Sardinia. Opposed to radicalism and concerned about democratic changes, he aligned with the conservatives during the political unrest in Geneva in the 1840s. He had four children from his marriage to Julie Cazenove, including two sons, Théophile and Auguste. Théophile Pictet de Rochemont pursued a military career, serving Piedmont and later Italy and reaching the rank of colonel, before turning to ecclesiastical service in Geneva. Auguste Pictet de Rochemont-Debrit, a Swiss army officer, rose to the rank of colonel, held command positions in Geneva, and also gained recognition for his musical talents. The male line of the Pictet de Rochemont branch ended in 1948 with the death of Maurice Pictet de Rochemont (1870-1948), the only son of Auguste Pictet de Rochemont, who dedicated himself to sports and music, presiding over the Geneva fencing society while actively supporting the creation of the Orchestre de la Suisse Romande, which he chaired from 1918 to 1928.^{,}
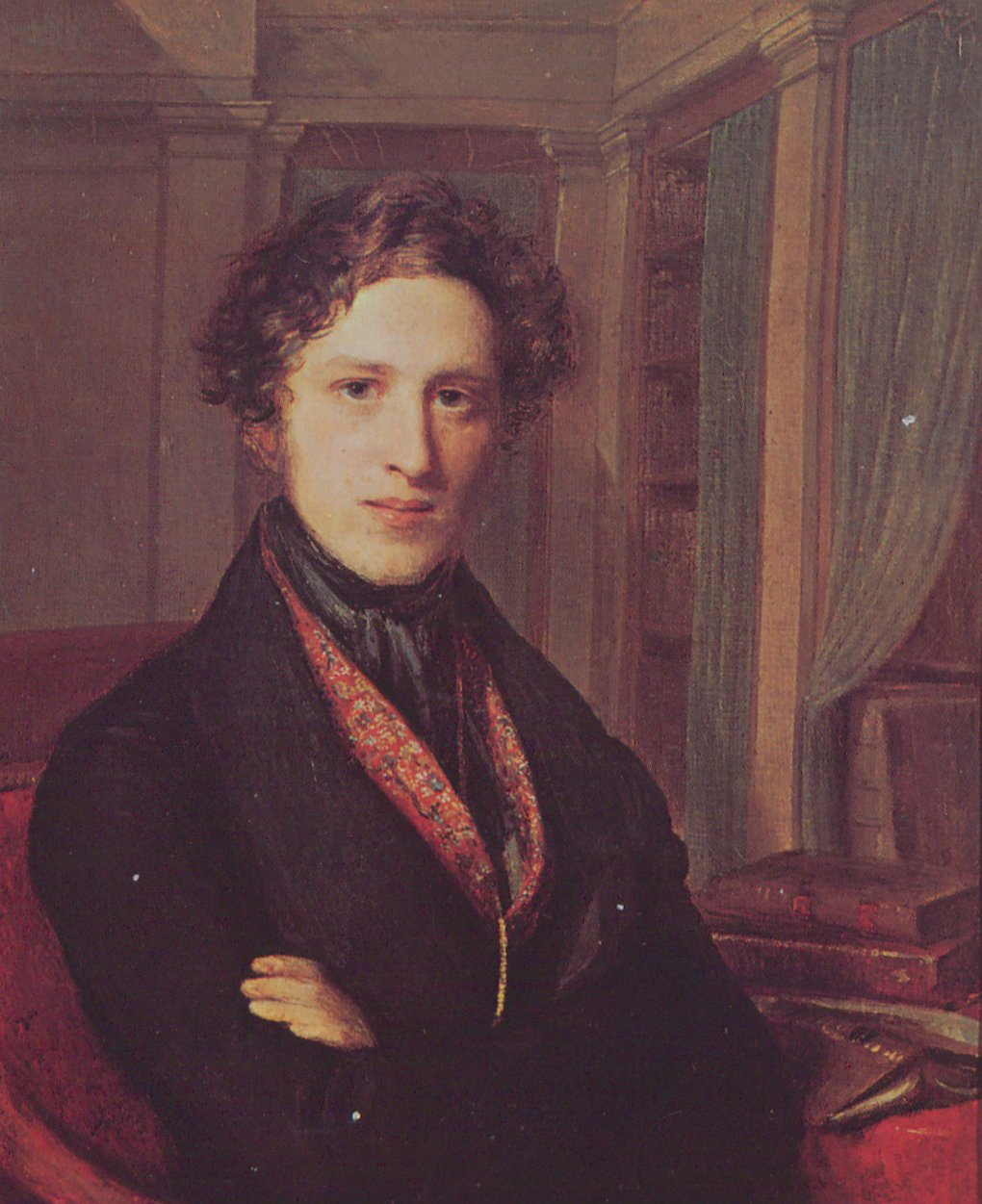
  Adolphe PIctet (1799-1875), in 1824
- Adolphe Pictet-Cazenove (1799-1875), the fourth son of Charles Pictet de Rochemont, distinguished himself in the 19^{th} century as a philosopher, linguist, and scholar, while simultaneously pursuing a military career. Educated in Geneva, Paris, Germany, and Great Britain, he frequented the major European intellectual centers and formed connections with prominent thinkers of his time, such as Victor Cousin, Schelling, Hegel and Goethe. In Une course à Chamouni (1838), he recounts the journey he undertook with Franz Liszt, Marie d'Agoult and George Sand through the Arve Valley and Switzerland. After returning to Geneva, he led the literary section of the Bibliothèque universelle, producing works that covered aesthetics, philosophy, and, most notably, comparative linguistics. His work De l'affinité des langues celtiques avec le sanscrit (1836) won him the Prix Volney from the Institut de France and made him one of the pioneers of Indo-European philology. He followed this major work with Les Origines indo-européennes, which established his international reputation and earned him a second Prix Volney. At the same time, he pursued a long military career in the Swiss Army, reaching the rank of federal colonel, and spent several decades developing war rockets, which he attempted, without much success, to have adopted by various European states. Despite numerous honors, including the Légion d'honneur, he remained a discreet figure. One son from his marriage to Emma Cazenove reached adulthood, Adolphe Pictet-de Fernex (1830–1893). An engineer and staff officer, he settled in Turin after his marriage, pursued a career in Italy, and received the title of Knight of the Crown of Italy. The male line of his descendants, who settled successively in Italy and then Algeria, died out in the early 20^{th} century, marking the disappearance of this family branch.
- Jean-François-Louis Pictet-Calandrini (1790-1858), the only son of Louis Pictet du Bengale, completed his studies at the Academy of Geneva before joining the bank Calandrini & Cie. He quickly became the sole director before being ruined by its liquidation. In 1829, he founded his own bank, Pictet-Calandrini, which he headed until his death; however, the establishment had no connection with the Pictet group developed within the youngest branch of the family. At the same time, he engaged in civic and military life, becoming a lieutenant and then captain of the grenadiers, an administrative councilor, and a member of Geneva's Grand Council. He supported several religious and educational institutions, while cultivating a taste for the arts, notably by commissioning landscapes from Alexandre Calame.
- Peter Pictet-Micheli (1794–1850) was the second son of Marc-Louis Pictet-Micheli de Dully and one of the last representatives of a long family military tradition. After starting out in the Vaudois militia at the time of the fall of the Napoleonic Empire, he pursued a career in the service of the Kingdom of Sardinia. He particularly distinguished himself during the Carbonari unrest of 1821. His career progressed steadily: captain, major, lieutenant-colonel, then honorary general. He was decorated several times with the Order of Saints Maurice and Lazarus. Returning to Geneva in the early 1830s, he settled in Landecy through his marriage to Louise-Pauline Micheli and led the life of a country gentleman. Attached to conservative principles, he briefly sat on the Grand Council of Geneva before the Fazy Revolution of 1846. His only son, Albert (1833–1879), inspired by an extensive study trip to Great Britain and Northern Europe, was interested in agriculture, natural sciences, and the organization of rural estates. Back in Geneva, he devoted himself to managing and expanding the Landecy estate, while dedicating his time and skills to philanthropic causes, notably as co-founder and administrator of the Métairie nursing home, near Nyon. Active in public life, he served as mayor of Bardonnex for more than a decade and was a member of the Grand Council, where he established himself as a figure in the independent and conservative camp. Passionate about history, he built significant collections, some of which he bequeathed to the Bibliothèque de Genève. Married without descendants and widowed young, he died at 44.
- Ferdinand Pictet (1796–1862), born at Château de Dully in 1796, was the third son of Marc-Louis Pictet-Micheli. He joined the British Army at a young age, serving as an infantry officer in the Antilles, South America and Canada before leaving the service in 1819. Back in Geneva, he pursued a distinguished civil career: as a member of the Chamber of Guardians, administrator of the Hospital for fifteen years, and deputy to the Representative Council from 1831 to 1841, he performed his duties with diligence and selflessness. His marriage to Adèle Martin provided him with lasting financial stability and firmly established him within the Geneva bourgeoisie. Of his three sons, Arthur pursued an unsuccessful banking career that led him to settle in France, founding the Pictet-Sévène branch; William enjoyed success in the mineral water trade in Geneva; lastly, Edward distinguished himself with a brilliant military and political career, becoming a significant municipal figure in Geneva.
- Armand Pictet (1798-1861), the fourth son of the Pictet-Micheli family of Dully, was the head of a British and then Australian branch of the family. He joined the army of the East India Company and then that of the British Crown at an early age, serving in India and distinguishing himself during the First Burmese War, for which he was awarded the Military Medal. After twelve years of service, he left the army in 1827 with the rank of captain. Back in Geneva, he married his cousin Anna Pictet, daughter of Louis Pictet du Bengale. Thanks to his connections in London, Armand was appointed British Consular Agent in Geneva in 1846, then British Consul in Switzerland in 1853, a position he held until his death. He played an active role in the founding of the Anglican Church in Geneva.
- Auguste Pictet-de Bock (1804-1874), the fifth and last son of Marc-Louis Pictet-Micheli de Dully, established a new family line through his marriage to Julie-Cécile de Bock, a member of the ancient Baltic nobility and the first foreigner married by a Pictet in Geneva since the 15^{th} century. Groomed for foreign service like his brothers, he served successively in Swiss troops serving France, then in the Piedmontese army, where he reached the rank of captain before retiring permanently in 1842. Settling in Geneva, Auguste dedicated himself to civil and ecclesiastical roles, notably as an assistant at the General Hospital, then as a deacon and member of the Consistory. Based in Plainpalais, then an independent municipality, he played a major role in municipal life: deputy mayor for twelve years, then mayor from 1862 to 1874, he facilitated the village's transformation into an urban suburb by developing public lighting, infrastructure, schools, and communal facilities. Upon his retirement, a street in Plainpalais was named after him. His marriage to Julie-Cécile resulted in five sons: Théodore, who died prematurely; Oswald and Léonce, whose careers were undistinguished; Raoul, a future renowned physicist and a prominent figure in the family; and Eugène, whose descendants ensured the continuity of the Pictet-de Bock branch.
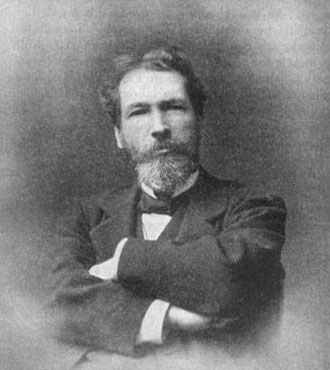
- Raoul Pictet, around 1920
  Raoul Pictet (1846-1929), the third of Auguste Pictet-de Bock's five sons, was a physicist and inventor, pioneering low temperatures and industrial refrigeration. Trained in Geneva and Paris, he designed his first refrigeration machine at 23. Between 1871 and 1874, he spent time in Egypt, where he taught physics, directed public works, built ice factories, and contributed to the creation of ophthalmological institutions. Back in Europe, he developed and patented numerous refrigeration processes, and in 1877 achieved the liquefaction of oxygen, a feat that earned him international recognition and led to the creation of a chair of industrial physics at the University of Geneva. Married first to Hélène Roget, then to Louise Reiche, he had twelve children, from whom the last male descendants of this branch originate today.

== Youngest branch ==
The youngest branch of the family descends from syndic Pierre Pictet (1626-1690). This branch is the largest and most prominent today. Initially active in the military, political, and scientific fields, several of its members are closely linked to the Pictet group, originally founded in 1805 by Jacob-Michel François de Candolle (1778-1841) and Jacques-Henry Mallet (1779-1807) under the name De Candolle, Mallet & Cie.

Since Edouard Pictet-Prevost became a partner of the bank in 1841, fifteen members of the Pictet family, over nine generations, have succeeded one another at the head of the Pictet Group:

- Edouard Pictet-Prevost (1841 to 1878), nephew by marriage of the founder Jacob-Michel François de Candolle
- Ernest Pictet (1856 to 1909), grandson of the founder Jacob-Michel François de Candolle
- Émile Pictet (1875 to 1909), son of Edouard Pictet-Prevost
- Guillaume Pictet (1889 to 1926), son of Ernest Pictet
- Aymon Pictet (1919 to 1928), son of Guillaume Pictet
- Albert Pictet (1928 to 1955), nephew of Guillaume Pictet
- Edouard Pictet (1950-1975), son of Guillaume Pictet
- Michel Pictet (1955-1980), son of Aymon Pictet
- Pierre Pictet (1963-1988), son of Albert Pictet
- Charles Pictet (1979-2005), son of Edouard Pictet
- Ivan Pictet (1982-2010), son of Michel Pictet
- Nicolas Pictet (1991-2019), descendant of Edouard Pictet-Prevost
- Fabien Pictet (1996-1997), son of Pierre Pictet
- Marc Pictet (since 2011), nephew of Charles Pictet
- François Pictet (since 2022), son of Charles Pictet

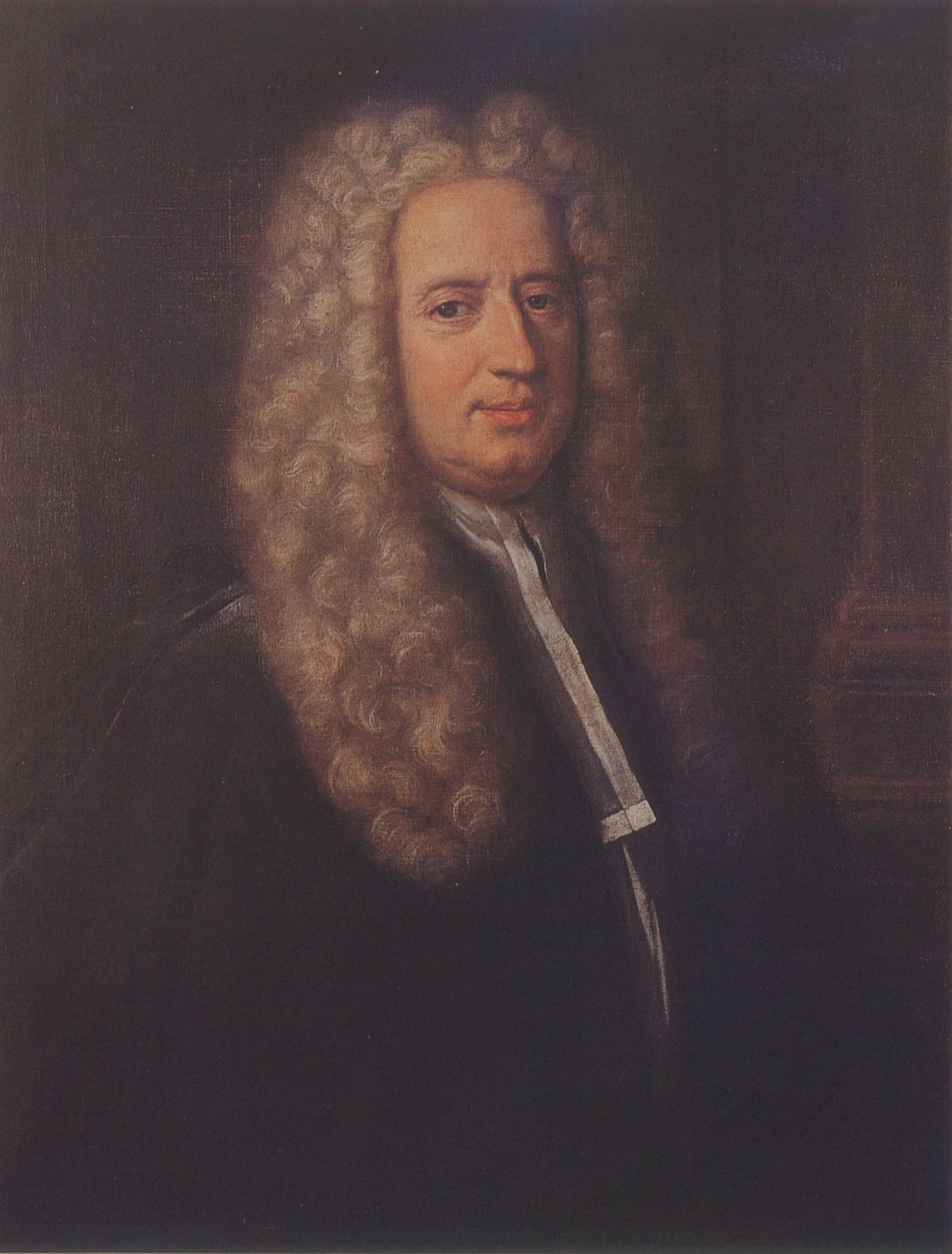
Jean-Louis Pictet (1739-1781)

- Jean-Louis Pictet (1739-1781), son of Jean Pictet, was a jurist, magistrate, and scholar. He studied law at the Academy of Geneva and became a lawyer in 1762. He pursued a political career in Geneva: member of the Council of Two Hundred in 1770, auditor in 1772, he joined the Small Council in 1775 and was elected syndic in 1778. Interested in astronomy and the natural sciences from an early age, he participated in the exploration of the Alps in 1762 and collaborated with Horace-Bénédict de Saussure. Invited by the Saint Petersburg Academy of Sciences, he observed the transit of Venus across the Sun in 1769 with his brother-in-law Jacques-André Mallet. He stayed in Lapland between 1768 and 1769, from where he brought back collections of natural specimens, scientific observations, and an illustrated journal. In 1773, he married Marguerite Mallet.
- Jean Marc Jules Pictet-Diodati (1768-1828), the only son of Pierre Pictet de Sergy, trained as a lawyer and had a long judicial and political career, first under the French regime (department of Léman) after the annexation of Geneva, then in the restored Republic. Judge at the Civil Court of Léman, president of the Criminal Court of Justice, and member of the French Legislature, he was renowned for his independence of mind, his sense of fairness, and his moderate opposition to imperial despotism. He was made Knight of the Empire in 1809 and Knight of the Légion of Honour in 1810. Friend of Mme de Staël and familiar with the Coppet group, he played a major role in Geneva's institutions after 1814, notably as President of the Supreme Court. He was the father of Jules Pictet.
- Jean-Pierre Pictet-Baraban (1777-1857), son of Jean-Louis Pictet and nephew of Jacques-André Mallet, was a jurist and politician. He studied philosophy and then law at the Academy of Geneva (1794-1796) and took science courses in Paris. A lawyer in Geneva in 1798, he also worked as a tutor in Alicante (1798-1801) and then as an assistant professor of experimental physics at the Academy of Geneva. He had a significant political career: deputy to the Geneva Representative Council (1814-1818, 1833-1841), Attorney General (1815-1818), State Councillor and Civil Lieutenant (1818-1832), deputy to the Constituent Assembly (1841) and to the Grand Council (1842-1846). He was also Mayor of Avully (1803-1815) and of Troinex (1842-1850). An active member of the Physics and Natural History Society, the Economics Society, and the Arts Society, he made a key contribution to Geneva's scientific and civic life. He married Adélaïde Baraban, heiress of the Marsillon estate in Troinex, who bore him four children: François-Jules, Edouard, Charles, and Victoire.
- Amédée-Pierre-Jules Pictet de Sergy (1795-1888), the only son of Jean Marc Jules Pictet-Diodati, lived through most of the 19^{th} century as a man of letters, magistrate, and historian of Geneva. He had a brief military engagement as a volunteer in the Geneva militia in 1814, then served as an officer at the École de Thoune. Later, as a lawyer and magistrate, he became an auditor of justice, a member of the Representative Council, a deputy to the Federal Diet, and then a State Councillor in 1835. His political career was shattered by the failure of his ambitious urban planning projects in Saint-Gervais, notably the Pont des Terreaux, which almost ruined him and led him to resign from the Council of State in 1839. The strikes and the riot of 1841 definitively ended his political career. From then on, he dedicated himself to writing, teaching, and civic action. A passionate historian, he notably published an important History of Geneva (1845-1847). First married to Adèle de Candolle, daughter of banker Jacob-Michel-François de Candolle, he had three sons, two of whom survived: Gustave Pictet and Ernest Pictet. Widowed at a young age, he later married Anna Pictet, daughter of Charles Pictet-de-Rochemont, with whom he had three more sons: Edmond, Julien (who died in infancy), and Alfred. Member of the Swiss Society for the Common Good, he contributed to the purchase of the Grütli meadow and its transfer to the Confederation in 1860.
- François-Jules Pictet de la Rive (1809-1872), the eldest son of Jean-Pierre Pictet-Baraban, was a naturalist, professor, and politician. He trained at the Academy of Geneva, then completed his studies in Paris, where he established lasting relationships with leading French naturalists. Appointed professor of zoology at the Academy of Geneva in 1835, he taught there until his death and made a decisive contribution to the development of paleontology, which became his main specialty. As the author of an extensive body of scientific work, he notably published the Traité élémentaire de paléontologie, a reference work, and directed the publication of Matériaux pour la paléontologie suisse, which led to the establishment of a genuine Geneva school in this discipline. He played a major role in the development of the Natural History Museum of Geneva, organizing and enriching its collections. Simultaneously, he pursued a significant political career. He was a member of Geneva's Grand Council for many years, serving twice as its president. He was also the rector of the Academy and a member of the National Council and the Council of States.
- Edouard Pictet-Prevost (1813-1878), son of Jean-Pierre Pictet-Baraban, trained at the Academy of Geneva and then in a trading house in Le Havre. He joined the bank De Candolle, Turrettini & Cie in 1836 and became a partner in 1841, giving his name to the bank. He managed the establishment for nearly thirty years. He simultaneously held several economic and judicial roles, notably with the Caisse d'épargne and the Commercial Court, without any significant political ambitions. Married to Amélie Prevost, who gave birth to their son Emile, he established the Pierre-Grise estate in Genthod, a symbol of his social success.
- Charles Pictet-Prevost (1823-1862), the third son of Jean-Pierre Pictet-Baraban, was educated at the Academy of Geneva, before pursuing law studies. He later worked as a lawyer (starting in 1851), then as deputy public prosecutor for the Canton of Geneva from 1856 to 1861. A recognized specialist in land issues, he was appointed by the Federal Council to serve on appraisal commissions related to railway expropriations, and participated actively in several public institutions, notably the Caisse hypothécaire. Alongside his civilian career, he pursued a military career, reaching the rank of major, and served as a militia investigating judge. In 1852, he married Suzanne Prevost. The couple settled at the Marsillon estate in Troinex. Three children were born from this marriage: Marie, Aloys and Gabriel. He died prematurely at the age of 39, but his descendants ensured his family branch would survive into the 20^{th} century. Gabriel had no descendants, but Aloys (1855-1924) became the father of four children. Several members of this branch (known as de Marsillon) were successively elected mayor of Troinex.
- Gustave Pictet (1827-1900), eldest son of Amédée-Pierre-Jules Pictet de Sergy, was a jurist and politician. After studying law in Heidelberg and Paris, he became a lawyer in Geneva, while pursuing a political career. He served on Geneva's Grand Council from 1864 to 1890, becoming its vice-president, and contributed to several legislative reforms, notably on inheritance law, court organization, and the protection of minors. He advocated for referendums and the direct election of representatives, and opposed electoral fraud. He was elected as a National Councillor multiple times. He married Amélie Lambert, but the couple did not have any children.

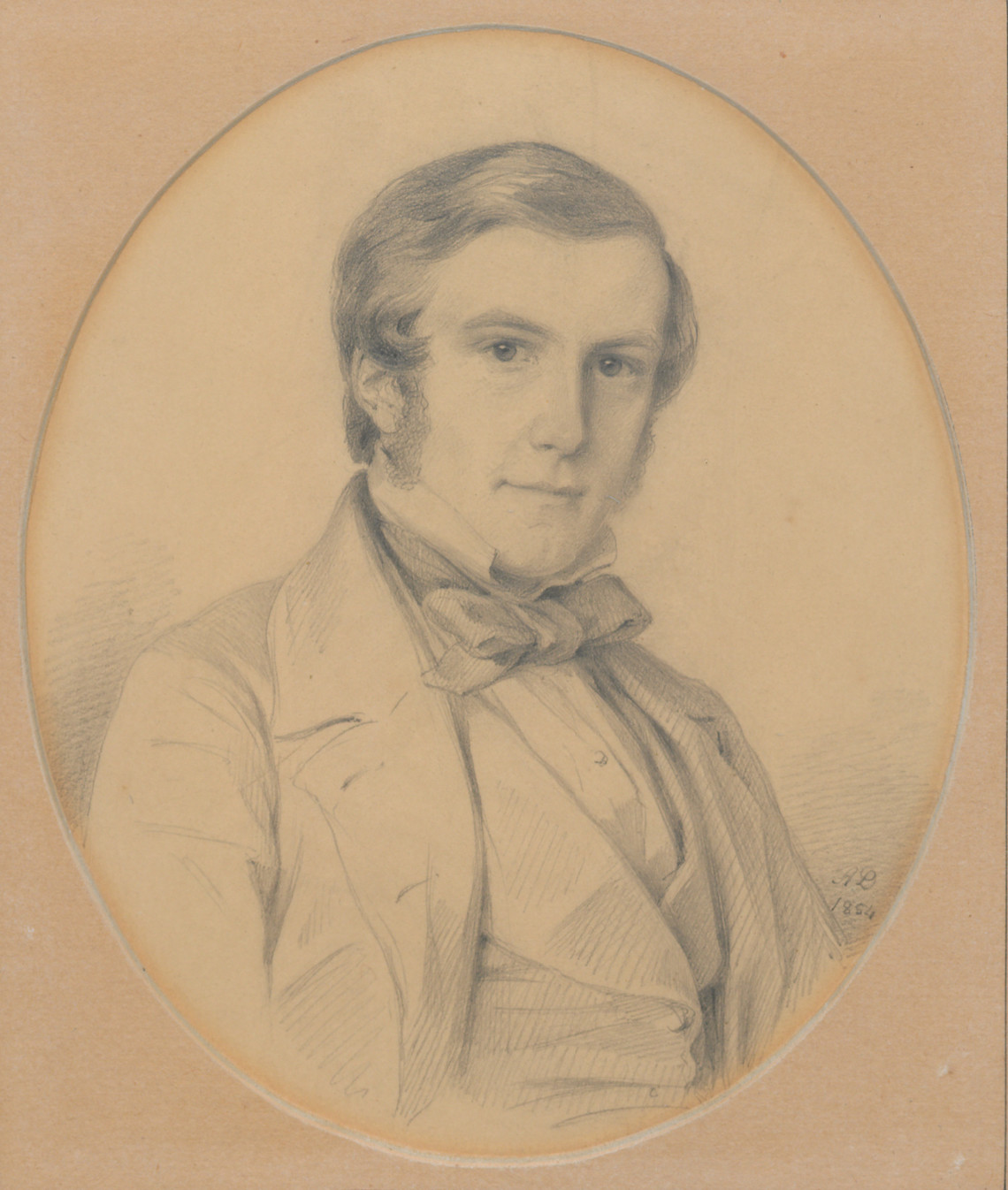
Ernest Pictet (1829-1909). Drawing from 1854

- Ernest Pictet (1829-1909), the second son of Amédée-Pierre-Jules Pictet de Sergy, studied in Geneva before completing a banking apprenticeship, notably in Liverpool, where he became familiar with English economics and the liberal school of Manchester. Returning to Geneva in 1856, he became a partner in the bank Edouard Pictet & Cie, taking over its management in 1878. At the same time, he presided over the Banque du Commerce from 1871 to 1907. He contributed to the creation of the Association commerciale et industrielle (1865), the future Geneva Chamber of Commerce and Industry, which he chaired twice, and played a key role in founding the Union suisse du commerce et de l'industrie (now Economiesuisse)^{,}. He was also concerned with the circulation of paper money in Switzerland, publishing a brochure in 1863 proposing a plan for a central bank involving the cantonal banks, and played an active role in establishing the Swiss National Bank in 1906-1907. He also engaged in local and national politics. He served on the Geneva City Council (1858-1878), became a judge and then president of the Commercial Court, and was elected to the Geneva Grand Council in 1878, where he immediately became president. He served twice on the National Council. Lastly, he served as mayor of Petit-Saconnex from 1894 to 1902. Married to Gabrielle Cayla, he had eight children, including five sons: Amé Pictet, Guillaume Pictet, Paul Pictet, Lucien Pictet and Arnold Pictet, with each distinguishing himself in different fields.
- Edmond Pictet (1835-1901), son of Amédée-Pierre-Jules Pictet de Sergy, completed a commercial apprenticeship in Germany, then spent thirteen years in England, where he learned about cooperative trade and the pioneering Rochdale model. He returned to Geneva in 1867, quickly becoming president of the Société coopérative de consommation, which he transformed from a small, modest association into a thriving network with several branches and turnover approaching one million francs by the end of the 19^{th} century. In 1890, he contributed to the creation of the Swiss Union of Consumer Cooperatives, bringing together cantonal initiatives and promoting the development of the cooperative movement on a national scale. A passionate historian, he wrote works on the history of Geneva and the Pictet family, notably publishing a biography of Charles Pictet de Rochemont. Single and deeply religious, he died at Petit-Villars in 1901.
- Édouard Pictet-Mallet (1835-1879), eldest son of François-Jules Pictet de la Rive, was a naturalist, scientist, and politician from Geneva. Passionate about natural sciences from an early age, he specialized in entomology. In 1865, he published the Synopsis des névroptères de l'Espagne, presenting several species that were unknown at the time. Alongside his scientific work, he engaged in public life. Elected to the Geneva City Council in 1866, then as a deputy to the Grand Council in 1878, he proposed pioneering electoral reforms aimed at ensuring voting integrity and the representation of minorities. He also pursued a military career, reaching the rank of lieutenant colonel. He also participated in topographical and lake research, collaborating with François-Alphonse Forel on the cartography and relief of Petit-Lac, published in 1877 and exhibited at the Exposition universelle de Paris in 1878. Married to Émilie Mallet in 1863, he had three sons: Camille, Gaston, and Pierre. Camille continued the family scientific tradition, becoming a naturalist and explorer in the Malay Archipelago, while Gaston and Pierre, though less well-known, nevertheless continued the family name.
- Alphonse Pictet (1838-1903), second son of François-Jules Pictet de la Rive, was a naturalist renowned for his entomological research and scientific travels. After studying at the Academy of Geneva and spending some time in Great Britain, he initially set his sights on commerce, but banking failures permanently turned him away from business. In 1869, he married Renée Girod, with whom he had a daughter, Marguerite. Widowed the following year, he sought solace and inspiration in his travels, visiting India, the Near East, North Africa, Tunisia, the Canary Islands, and Serbia. These expeditions, often arduous and carried out on horseback, fueled his scientific research. Encouraged by Henri de Saussure, Alphonse devoted himself to natural history, particularly the study of grasshoppers and other orthoptera. He published several memoirs in collaboration with Saussure and was a member of the Geneva Museum Commission from 1890 until his death in 1903.
- Amé Pictet (1857-1937), the eldest son of Ernest Pictet, dedicated himself to the field of chemistry. After studying in Germany and France with the greatest chemists of his time (Kekulé, Graebe and Wurtz), he was appointed in 1894 as a professor of medicinal chemistry, chemical biology and toxicology at the University of Geneva, and in 1906, he received a chair in inorganic and organic chemistry. He taught there until 1932, at the age of 75. His studies focused on the synthesis of alkaloids and he is credited with the discovery of the Pictet-Spengler reaction.
- Guillaume Pictet (1860-1926), the second son of Ernest Pictet, dedicated himself to finance, becoming, like his father, a partner in the Pictet bank starting in 1889^{,}. He ensured its growth in the early 20^{th} century. He became a member of the Geneva Chamber of Commerce in 1899, joined the International Committee of the Red Cross in 1919, and in later life (1924-1926) became a member of Geneva's Council of State, a role that allowed him to reorganize the Finance Department and replenish the canton's finances. Six children were born from his marriage to Alice Cramer in 1884: Aymon, André, Fernand, Germaine, Gertrude, and Gustave. After becoming a widower, he married Louise Binet in 1906, who gave birth to three more children: Gabrielle, Ernest and Edouard.
- Paul Pictet (1862-1947), the third son of Ernest Pictet, became a doctor of law in 1889 and then embarked on a diplomatic and journalistic career, initially as a correspondent for the Journal de Genève. An active figure in Geneva's public life, he served as General Secretary of the Swiss National Exhibition in 1896 and founded the newspaper La Suisse, which he ran until 1903. Engaged in politics, he served for many years on Geneva's Grand Council and City Council, which he chaired multiple times, and played a central role in defending Geneva's free trade zones in the early 1920s. Husband of Marie Hirschgartner, he was the father of three children: Hélène, Albert and Eva.
- Lucien Pictet (1864-1928) the fourth son of Ernest Pictet, was a prominent figure in the early automotive industry in Geneva. Educated at the Polytechnicum in Zurich, without obtaining an engineering degree, he gained substantial practical experience at Escher-Wyss, then at the Mechanical Construction Workshops in Vevey, before moving to Geneva to join Faesch, Piccard & Cie, specialists in water turbines. Partnered with Paul Piccard for the production of water turbines, he founded the Société d'automobiles de Genève with a Zurich investor, which later became Piccard, Pictet & Cie^{,}. Cars produced under the SAG, and later Pic-Pic, names gained widespread international acclaim, notably crowned by a Grand Prix at the Exposition universelle de Paris in 1900 and setting speed records in the early 20^{th} century. At the same time, Lucien Pictet became involved in public life, serving on the municipal council of Le Petit-Saconnex and then on the Geneva Grand Council. The First World War brought exceptional prosperity to the company, which shifted to armament manufacture, but the post-war period led to the bankruptcy of Piccard & Pictet in 1920. After losing most of his fortune, Lucien Pictet moved to France, where he founded an optical instrument factory and developed a pioneering process for polarizing light. He was married first to Marguerite Rigot, with whom he had a daughter, Simone, and then Marguerite Chouet, who gave him two children: Jean and Violette, who would take the stage name of Isabelle Villars.
- Arnold Pictet (1869-1948), the fifth son of Ernest Pictet, was a naturalist and entomologist, and authored over 200 academic research articles in these fields. He studied natural sciences in Geneva (1887-1890), then worked at the family bank in London and Geneva until 1905. Simultaneously, he became a member of the Geneva Physics and History Society in 1897. He then resumed his studies at the University of Geneva, obtaining his doctorate in 1909 and then becoming privat-docent. Starting in 1918, he collaborated with Émile Guyénot's laboratory and conducted his research at the experimental zoology station in Geneva until his death. As a butterfly specialist, he made significant discoveries in lepidopterology and published two seminal works in 1905 and 1912. He was a co-founder of the Geneva Lepidopterological Society and held several key positions in Swiss scientific societies. He was one of the first scientists invited to systematically study the ecosystem of the newly created Swiss National Park^{,}.
- Hélène Gautier-Pictet (1888-1973), daughter of Paul Pictet (1862-1947, journalist and founder of the newspaper La Suisse), studied in Geneva, where she met Emilie Gourd, a leading figure in Swiss feminism, who convinced her to campaign for women's suffrage. In 1909, she married banker Charles Gautier, with whom she had five children. Hélène first created the Association féminine d'éducation nationale, then the Centre de liaison des associations féminines genevoises in 1937, which she headed for twenty years. She was strongly involved in the 1952 consultation on women's suffrage in Geneva, which was successful, but the cantonal referendum in 1953 (reserved for men, the fifth in 32 years) and the federal referendum in 1959 rejected this right, which was not introduced in Geneva until 1960 (1971 at federal level)^{,}. Close to the Quaker movement, which she joined in 1941, she was also an activist for pacifism throughout her life.
- Albert Pictet (1890-1969), son of Paul Pictet and Marie Hirschgartner, was a lawyer, banker, and politician. He obtained a law degree from the University of Geneva in 1912 and was admitted to the Geneva bar in 1917. He began his career in the Federal Political Department and at the Swiss Legation in Paris, then held senior positions with the Swiss Chambers of Commerce in Paris and Geneva, which he chaired from 1955 to 1960. Having become a partner at Banque Pictet in 1928, he played an important role in national business circles, notably as a member of the Swiss Chamber of Commerce. A pioneer in the development of commercial aviation in Switzerland and an infantry officer with the rank of captain, he was elected as a member of the Council of States from 1942 to 1947, and served during the Second World War as a mediator between General Guisan and the Federal Council. Married in 1921 to Marguerite Mallet, he was the father of Madeline, Pierre, Serge, and Marylise.
- Jean Pictet (1914-2002), son of Lucien Pictet, studied law before devoting most of his time to the International Committee of the Red Cross where he was successively a jurist (1937), director (1946), vice-president (1971-1979), and honorary vice-president. He was also one of the main architects of the 1949 Geneva Conventions and the Additional Protocols of 1977. Lastly, he was Associate Professor of International Humanitarian Law at the University of Geneva (1965-1979) and held the positions of director (1975-1979) and then president (1979-1981) of the Henry Dunant Institute.
- Violette Pictet (1920-1996), daughter of Lucien, better known by her stage name of Isabelle Villars, studied drama in Paris with Louis Jouvet, then began a career in cinema. She left occupied France and joined the Comédie de Genève. She wrote over 200 detective plays for Swiss French radio

== Bibliography ==
- Candaux, Jean-Daniel (1974). Histoire de la famille Pictet 1474-1974. Etienne Braillard.
