= Lauwe =

Lauwe may refer to:

- Lauwe, name until 1941 of the rural locality of Yablonovka in Saratov Oblast, Russia
- Lauwe (Belgium), former municipality and currently a borough of the city of Menen, Belgium
