= Yablonovka =

Yablonovka (Russian: Яблоновка) is the name of several rural localities in Russia:

- Yablonovka, Chuvash Republic, a village in Chukalskoye Rural Settlement of Shemurshinsky District of the Chuvash Republic
- Yablonovka, Gvardeysky District, Kaliningrad Oblast, a settlement in Slavinsky Rural Okrug of Gvardeysky District of Kaliningrad Oblast
- Yablonovka, Ozyorsky District, Kaliningrad Oblast, a settlement in Gavrilovsky Rural Okrug of Ozyorsky District of Kaliningrad Oblast
- Yablonovka, Kaluga Oblast, a village in Maloyaroslavetsky District of Kaluga Oblast
- Yablonovka, Leningrad Oblast, a logging depot settlement in Gromovskoye Settlement Municipal Formation of Priozersky District of Leningrad Oblast
- Yablonovka, Novgorod Oblast, a rural locality classified as a railway station under the administrative jurisdiction of Uglovskoye Settlement in Okulovsky District of Novgorod Oblast
- Yablonovka, Omsk Oblast, a village in Krasnoyarsky Rural Okrug of Sherbakulsky District of Omsk Oblast
- Yablonovka, Primorsky Krai, a selo in Yakovlevsky District of Primorsky Krai
- Yablonovka, Saratov Oblast, a selo in Rovensky District of Saratov Oblast
