= Louis Paul Cailletet =

French physicist and inventor

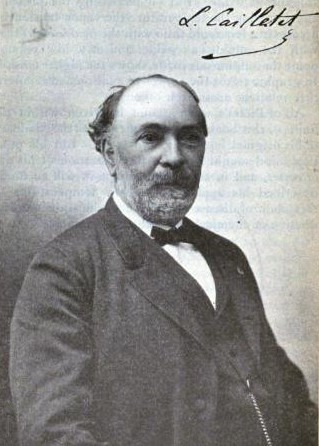
- Louis Paul Cailletet
- Born: 21 September 1832; Châtillon-sur-Seine, Côte-d'Or
- Died: 5 January 1913 (aged 80)
- Known for: Liquefaction of gases
- Awards: Davy Medal (1878)
- Scientific career
- Fields: Physics

Louis-Paul Cailletet (21 September 1832 – 5 January 1913) was a French physicist and inventor.

== Life and work ==
Cailletet was born in Châtillon-sur-Seine, Côte-d'Or. Educated in Paris, Cailletet returned to Châtillon to manage his father's ironworks. In an effort to determine the cause of accidents that occurred while tempering incompletely forged iron, Cailletet found that heating the iron put it in a highly unstable state, with gases dissolved in it. He then analyzed the gases from blast furnaces, which helped him understand the role of heat in the changes of states (phases) of metals. This brought him to the work of liquefying the various gases.

Cailletet succeeded in producing droplets of liquid oxygen in 1877 by a different method than Raoul Pictet: He used the Joule-Thomson effect; oxygen was cooled while highly compressed, then allowed to rapidly expand, cooling it further, resulting in the production of small droplets of liquid oxygen.

Among his other achievements, Cailletet installed a 300-m/985-ft high manometer on the Eiffel Tower; conducted an investigation of air resistance on falling bodies; made a study of a liquid-oxygen breathing apparatus for high-altitude ascents; and developed numerous devices, including automatic cameras, an altimeter, and air-sample collectors for sounding-balloon studies of the upper atmosphere.

== See also ==
- Liquefaction of gases
- Timeline of low-temperature technology
