= Amé Pictet =

Swiss chemist (1857–1937)

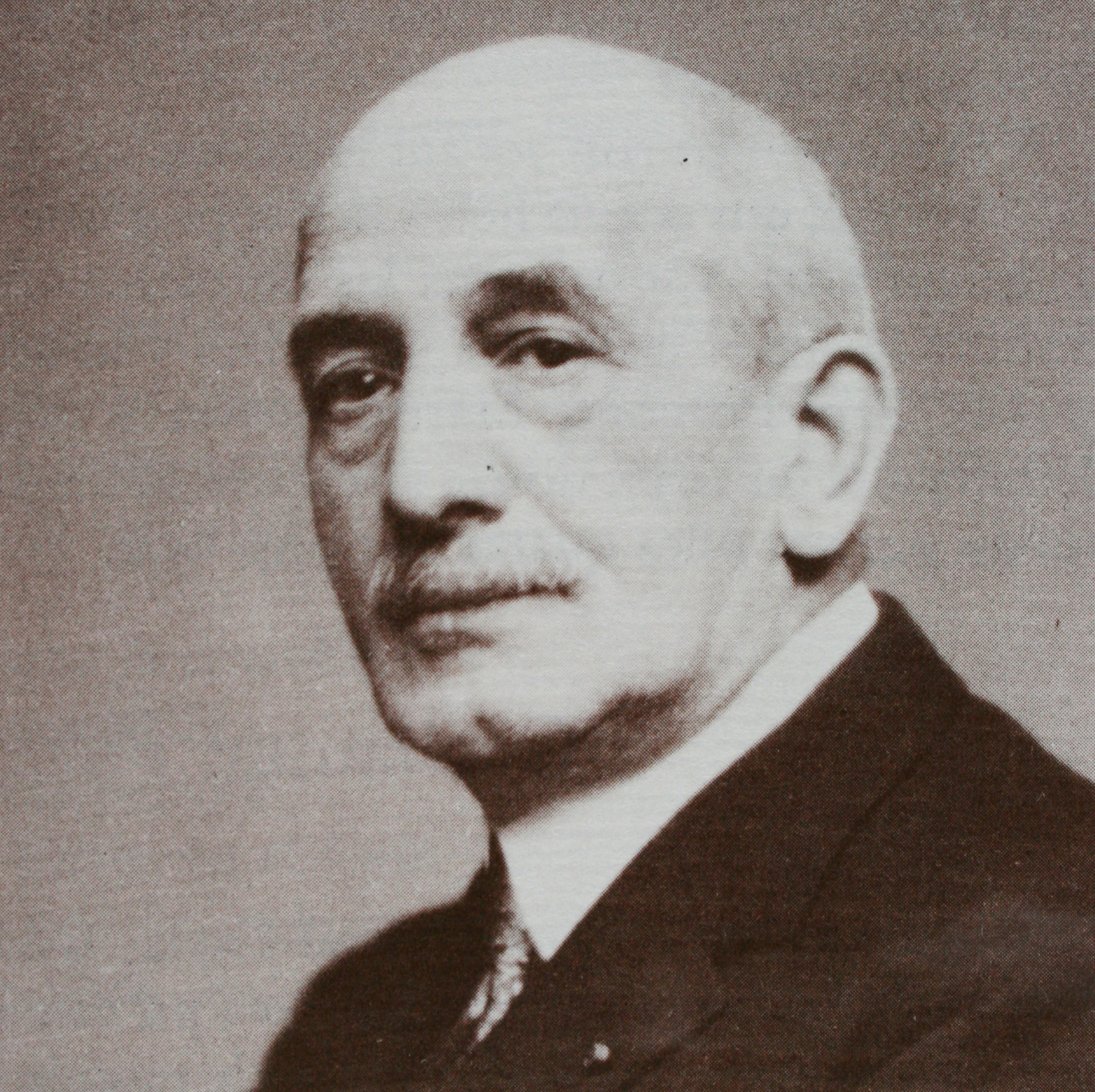
- Photograph by Frédéric Boissonnas, 1930
- Born: July 12, 1857; Geneva, Switzerland
- Died: March 11, 1937 (aged 79); Geneva, Switzerland
- Education: University of Geneva
- Known for: Pictet-Spengler reaction
- Family: Pictet family
- Scientific career
- Doctoral advisor: Carl Graebe

Amé Jules Pictet (12 July 1857 – 11 March 1937) was a Swiss chemist. He discovered the Pictet–Spengler reaction, and the related Pictet–Hubert reaction and Pictet–Gams reaction. He is credited with publishing the first synthesis of nicotine.

== Biography ==
Pictet was born in Geneva on 12 July 1857, the son of Ernest Pictet and Gabrielle Elisabeth Fuzier-Cayla. His father, a great-nephew of Augustin Pyramus de Candolle, was an associate, then the director, of the Pictet Group. Pictet studied chemistry at the Royal Saxon Polytechnic in Dresden from 1877, with Rudolf Schmitt, then at the University of Bonn in 1879, with August Kekulé and Richard Anschütz. He returned to Geneva in 1880 and obtained his doctorate from the University of Geneva the following year, with Carl Graebe as his doctoral advisor.

Pictet lectured at the University of Geneva in a variety of roles: He became a Privatdozent in 1884, extraordinary professor of organic chemistry in 1894, then ordinary professor of pharmaceutical, biological and toxicological chemistry in 1899, and was professor of organic and inorganic chemistry from 1906 to 1932. Pictet was the director of the university's Institute of Chemistry, and also taught at the Geneva College from 1888 to 1893.

Pictet published over 160 works dealing with the structure and synthesis of heterocycles (phenanthridine, chrysoidine, alkaloids) and saccharides, as well as the synthesis of disaccharides (maltose, lactose). He co-founded the Swiss Chemical Society in 1901 and the periodical Helvetica Chimica Acta in 1917. Pictet was an honorary member of numerous societies, an Officer of the Legion of Honour, and a doctor honoris causa of the universities of Cambridge (1923) and Brussels (1930).
