= Peter Hartmann =

Swiss sculptor (1921–2007)

- Born: 19 June 1921; Hamburg, Germany
- Died: 14 November 2007 (aged 86); Geneva, Switzerland
- Known for: Sculpture
- Notable work: Virgin - L'Église du Christ-Roi, Petit Lancy Le Repos - Quai Ernest Ensermet, Geneva Monument to Charles Pictet de Rochemont - Promenade de la Treill, Geneva

Peter Hartmann (19 June 1921 – 14 November 2007) was a Swiss sculptor known for his bronze sculptures installed in public spaces in Geneva.

== Early life ==
Hartmann was born in Hamburg in 1921, the son of a Swiss immigrant father and a German-Danish mother. He spent his youth in Cairo, Egypt where his father was posted for work.

== Early career ==
Hartmann attended primary school at the International English and International German schools in Cairo. After completing his primary educational studies, he was then sent to Germany to complete his higher education. In 1939 Hartmann obtained his baccalaureat award and had decided to become an artist. Bowing to pressure from his father, he agreed instead to study architecture in Berlin. Hartmann's architecture studies were pre-empted by the outbreak of World War II in Europe, so, finding himself in Geneva at the end of the war, he studied sculpture with Henri Paquet.

In 1946, Hartmann returned to Cairo where he set up his first studio in his parents' garage. He subsequently moved around Europe, spending time sculpting and studying in Florence, Positano and Paris. He finally settled in Geneva in 1950, where he did the bulk of his work.

== Later career ==
Hartmann worked in Geneva from 1950 until the end of his career in the late 1990s.

In 1957 he received his first commission for a large work - the Virgin for L'Église du Christ-Roi in Petit Lancy.

In 1959 he had his first solo exhibition, which was followed by many solo and collective shows in Geneva, and throughout the French part of Switzerland.

In 1968 he received his most important commission which was the statue of Charles Pictet de Rochemont, now installed on the Promenade de la Treille in Geneva.

Hartmann supplemented his sculpting income as a restorer at the Musée d'Art et d'Histoire.

== Later life and death ==
Hartmann continued his activities as a sculptor until the end of the 1990s when he was stricken by Parkinson's disease, which gradually prevented to him from fully working with his hands.

Hartmann died in Geneva on November 14, 2007.

== Works ==
=== Dietesheim Gallery ===
Hartmann's works were showcased in a 1979 exhibition at the Dietesheim gallery, Neuchâtel. A reviewer of the exhibition said:

Peter Hartmann, c'est une manière prestigieuse d'imposer ses œuvres, son goût de la beauté, son style passionné. Des œuvres de caractère et une noblesse de l'expression. Ce goût classique d'où percent la sensualité et la simplicité fait de Peter Hartmann un grand sculpteur. Point d'audace dans ses sculptures, seules une perpeption du rythme et une suggestion du mouvement, des personnages issus de la mythologie et de la réalité. Une recherche de l'essentiel qui est atteinte.

Peter Hartmann asserts his work, his taste for beauty, and his passionate style with distinction. His pieces are characterized by strong personality and nobility of expression. This classical sensibility—through which sensuality and simplicity shine—marks Peter Hartmann as a great sculptor. There is no audacity in his sculptures; instead, one finds a perception of rhythm and a suggestion of movement, with figures drawn from both mythology and reality.

=== Individual exhibitions ===
- Gallery Motte, Geneva, 1964
- Gallery Vanier, Geneva, 1968
- Gallery Vanier, Geneva, 1975
- Gallery Vanier, Geneva, 1975
- Gallery Steingasser, Carouge, 1976
- Gallery André Buchs, Geneva, 1979
- Gallery Dietesheim, Neuchâtel, 1981
- Gallery des Platanes, Carouge, 1987
- Gallery Cluny, Geneva, 1991
- Gallery La Collection, Vesenaz, 1994
- Gallery du Simplon, Vevey, 1998
- Retrospective of the Works of Peter Hartmann, Gallery Castellino Fine Arts, Geneva, 2008

=== Collective exhibitions ===
- Gallery George Moos, 1952
- Oeuvre Geneve (Exhibition of the Works of Geneva), 1961
- Sculpteurs de Geneve, Parc des Eaux Vives, Geneva, 1962
- Sculpteurs de Geneve, Parc des Eaux Vives, Geneva, 1963
- Sculpteurs Genevois, Club Migros, Geneva, 1965
- Sculpteurs de Geneve, Parc des Eaux Vives, Geneva, 1966
- Sculpture en Plein Air, Montreux, 1969
- Sculpture en Plein Air, Montreux, 1970
- Musée d'Art et d'Histoire, Geneva, 1984
- Sculptures of Grand Lancy, Geneva, 1985
- Jardin Botanique, Geneva

=== Permanent installations ===
Many of Hartmann's works are permanently installed in various public spaces around Geneva. The most significant of these are shown below.

== In media ==
Hartmann has been the topic of a documentary film titled Peter Hartmann by French film directors Patrick Constantin and Florent Saccon.
