= Phenanthridine =

Names
- Preferred IUPAC name Phenanthridine
- Other names Benzo[c]quinoline 6-Phenanthridine 3,4-Benzoquinoline 9-Azaphenanthrene 3,4-Benzoisioquinoline 5-Azaphenanthrene CCRIS 1234

Identifiers
CAS Number	229-87-8
3D model (JSmol)	Interactive image
ChEBI	CHEBI:36421
ChemSpider	8834
ECHA InfoCard	100.005.396
EC Number	205-934-4
PubChem CID	9189
UNII	62QGS7CPS6
CompTox Dashboard (EPA)	DTXSID3074288
- InChI: InChI=1S/C13H9N/c1-2-6-11-10(5-1)9-14-13-8-4-3-7-12(11)13/h1-9H Key: RDOWQLZANAYVLL-UHFFFAOYSA-N; InChI=1/C13H9N/c1-2-6-11-10(5-1)9-14-13-8-4-3-7-12(11)13/h1-9H Key: RDOWQLZANAYVLL-UHFFFAOYAL
- SMILES: C1=CC=C2C(=C1)C=NC3=CC=CC=C23

Properties
Chemical formula	C_{13}H_{9}N
Molar mass	179.222 g·mol^{−1}
Appearance	colorless solid
Density	1.341 g/cm^{3}
Melting point	104–107 °C
Boiling point	349 °C at 1.025 hPa
Solubility in water	almost insoluble (7.7 μg/mL at pH 7.4)
Vapor pressure	0.0000208 mmHg
Acidity (pK_{a})	4.61

Hazards
- GHS labelling
Pictograms	(GHS05: Corrosive) (GHS06: Toxic) (GHS07: Exclamation mark)
Signal word	Danger
Hazard statements	H301, H315, H318, H335
Precautionary statements	P261, P264, P264+P265, P270, P271, P280, P301+P316, P302+P352, P304+P340, P305+P354+P338, P317, P319, P321, P330, P332+P317, P362+P364, P403+P233, P405, P501
Flash point	100 °C (closed cup)
- Lethal dose or concentration (LD, LC)
LD_{50} (median dose)	oral, rat: 100 mg/kg (acute toxic)
- Except where otherwise noted, data are given for materials in their standard state (at 25 °C [77 °F], 100 kPa). verify (what is ?) Infobox references

Phenanthridine is a nitrogen heterocyclic compound with the formula C_{13}H_{9}N. It is a colorless solid, although impure samples can be brownish. It is a precursor to DNA-binding fluorescent dyes through intercalation. Examples of such dyes are ethidium bromide and propidium iodide. Phenanthridine was discovered by Amé Pictet and H. J. Ankersmit in 1891.

== Structure ==
Structurally, the molecule is flat but otherwise unremarkable.

== Preparation ==
Phenanthridine is typically extracted from coal tar, an abundant resource where it is found at a level of about 0.1%.

Phenanthridine was prepared by Pictet and Ankersmit by pyrolysis of the condensation product of benzaldehyde and aniline. In the Pictet–Hubert reaction (1899) the compound is formed in a reaction of the 2-aminobiphenyl – formaldehyde adduct (an N-acyl-o-xenylamine) with zinc chloride at elevated temperatures. This traditional method proceeds in low yield and gives various side products (approximately 30-50%). The pyrolysis method involves passing benzylideneaniline through a pumice-filled tube heated to 600–800 °C, where rearrangement and decomposition occur. The resulting pyrolysis products are collected and purified through fractional distillation to remove side products such as benzene, benzonitrile, aniline, and biphenyl. The remaining crude phenanthridine can be crystallized as a mercurochloride salt for further isolation.

The second method is the Morgan–Walls reaction that gives a 42% yield of phenanthridine after purification. It involves a cyclodehydration process. This route starts with heating 2-aminobiphenyl with formic acid to give o-formamidobiphenyl. The intermediate is then treated with phosphorus oxychloride to promote cyclization. Nitrobenzene as a high-boiling solvent can improve the yield by allowing higher reaction temperatures.

Morgan and Walls in 1931 improved the Pictet–Hubert reaction by replacing the metal by phosphorus oxychloride and using nitrobenzene as a reaction solvent. For this reason, the reaction is also called the Morgan–Walls reaction.

The reaction is similar to the Bischler–Napieralski reaction and the Pictet–Spengler reaction.

== Reactions ==
In terms of reactivity, phenanthridine resembles its more common isomer acridine. It is a weak base. It forms a methiodide. It resists common oxidants. It forms adducts with metal ions.

== Metabolism ==
Phenanthridine undergoes metabolic transformation primarily through oxidative pathways in both microbial and vertebrate systems. The major metabolite is the amide phenanthridone, which is primarily done by the cytochrome P450 enzymes. The phenanthridone metabolite is more mutagenic than the parent compound.

A study that tested the metabolism of phenanthridine to phenanthridone by rat lung and liver microsomes suggests that further hydroxylation or epoxidation could enhance phenanthridone's mutagenic effects.

The two main mechanisms of action are: topoisomerase inhibition and DNA intercalation.

=== Research ===
Phenanthridine derivatives have attracted attention from medicinal chemists. The two main mechanisms of action are: topoisomerase inhibition and DNA intercalation. When functionalized, phenanthridine derivatives can exhibit strong DNA-binding affinity, enzyme inhibition and cytotoxic effects. s

Phenanthridine derivatives basis for DNA-binding fluorescent dyes, such as ethidium bromide and propidium iodide, which intercalate between nucleic acid base pairs.

Looking at a derivative mentioned in the mechanism of action, the efficacy of ethidium bromide is clarified by being mentioned as a potent mutagen. In addition, the intercalating properties of ethidium bromide with DNA is used in laboratory applications for visualizing nucleic acids during gel electrophoresis, where careful considerations of ethidium bromide concentration and the electrophoresis conditions is essential for obtaining accurate results.

=== Medicinal chemistry ===
Phenanthridine exhibits some mutagenic properties following activation with rat liver enzymes (S-9 fraction), which simulates mammalian metabolism, making it a suspected human carcinogen. In addition it has been found that phenanthridine was genotoxic and phototoxic as well. Furthermore, phenanthridine can be metabolized to phenanthridone, which has been identified as directly mutagenic in Salmonella strain TA-98. Research suggests that phenanthridone can interact with DNA and induce mutations without requiring enzymatic activation.

== Hydropthenanthridines ==
Hydrophenanthridines of the crinine-type alkaloids

Buphasine

Macowine

Augustisine

Amaryllisine

Buphanidrine

Haemanthamine

Many hydrophenanthridines have been identified in nature. These compounds, all of which are chiral, feature one or two partially hydrogenated rings. Some examples are hamayne, norpluviine, and the crinines.
