= LeRoy and Pictet =

LeRoy and Pictet was a co-operative company which recruited Germans to settle in Russia in the 18th century, under commission by Tsarina Catherine the Great.

The company was formed by LeRoy, a Frenchman, Pictet, a Swiss from Geneva, and Sonntag, a German. There were two other corporations active in the field of recruiting settlers to Russia, one formed by the Frenchman Baron Caneu de Beauregard with Major Otto Friedrich of Monjou and the other, with no independent funding, by Jean de Boffe, Meusnier de Precour, and Quentin Benjamin Coulhette d'Hautervive.

To settlers wearied by wars and economic crises, Catherine promised freedom of religion, exemptions from taxes and military service, and the right to dispose of their land as they wished. Thousands of German craftsmen and farmers responded to these recruitment efforts and founded 103 German villages on both sides of the Volga; they are thus known as the Volga Germans. Le Roy and Pictet established 25 colonies comprising 1,530 families with 5,339 people, along the Volga south of Saratov and to the east on its left tributaries the Karaman and Tarlyk, for example the colony of Lauwe, now Yablonovka, founded as a Lutheran colony on 19 August 1767. Le Roy and Pictet later became managers of the colonies.
