= Vieux Grenadiers =

Société des Vieux-Grenadiers
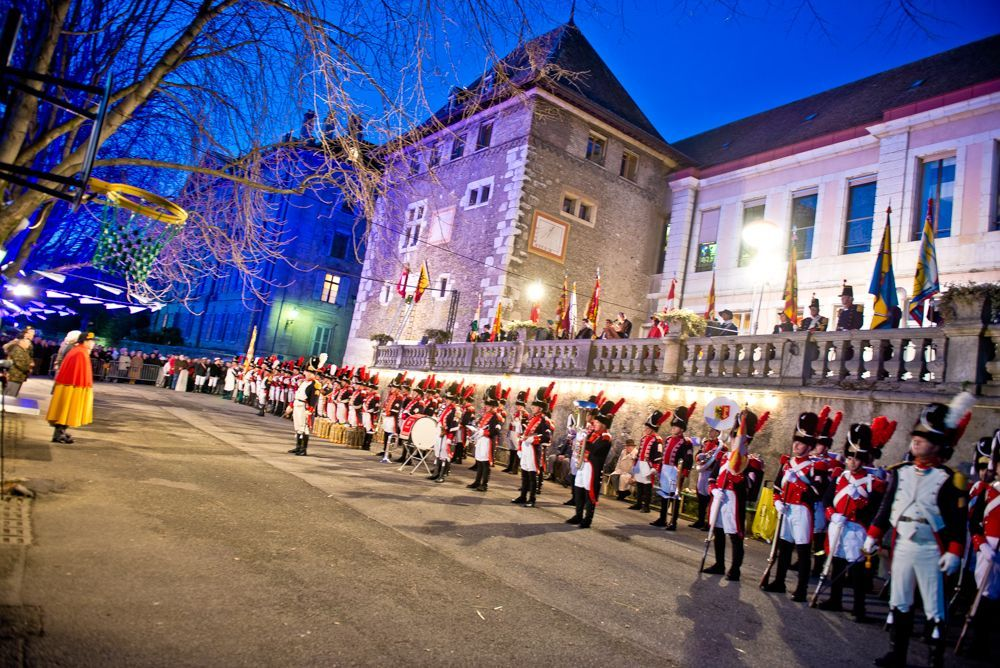
- The Vieux Grenadiers during an official ceremony
- Formation: October 1749
- Headquarters: Geneva, Switzerland
- Website: https://www.vieuxgrenadiers.ch/

The Société des Vieux Grenadiers (French: Society of the Old Grenadiers) is a Geneva-based society founded in 1749.

The group takes its name from the grenadiers, a local militia founded in 1686, and disbanded in 1747 for acts of rebellion. While initially simply called Cercle des Grenadiers, the group adopted its current denomination to distinguish itself from another grenadier society that, between 1821 and 1823, only accepted younger members.

The first uniforms appeared in 1896 only, during the Swiss National Exposition taking place in the city. From then on, the Vieux Grenadiers have been a regular feature of local ceremonies and commemorations.

Society membership is exclusively male. Its official motto is Homeland, Family, Friendship.
