= Troinex =

- Municipality
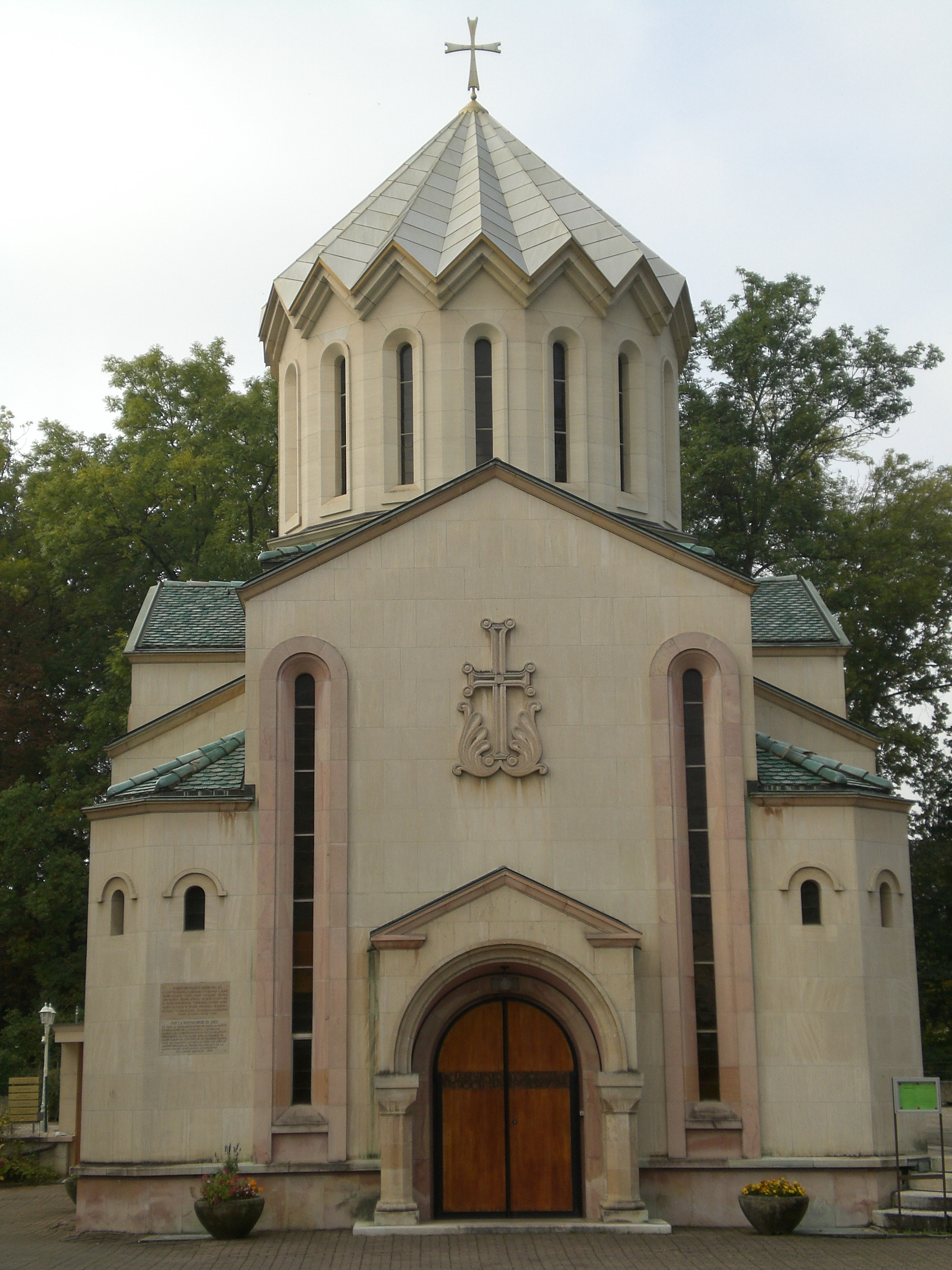

- Flag Coat of arms
- Location of Troinex
- Location within Switzerland Location within Canton of Geneva
- Coordinates: 46°09′N 06°09′E
- Country: Switzerland
- Canton: Geneva
- District: n.a.

Government
  - Mayor: Maire; Jacques Magnenat

Area
  - Total: 3.42 km^{2} (1.32 sq mi)
- Elevation: 425 m (1,394 ft)

Population (December 2020)
  - Total: 2,551
  - Density: 746/km^{2} (1,930/sq mi)
- Time zone: UTC+01:00 (CET)
  - Summer (DST): UTC+02:00 (CEST)
- Postal code: 1256
- SFOS number: 6641
- ISO 3166 code: CH-GE
- Surrounded by: Bardonnex, Bossey (FR-74), Carouge, Collonges-sous-Salève (FR-74), Étrembières (FR-74), Plan-les-Ouates, Veyrier
- Website: www.troinex.ch

Troinex is a municipality of the Canton of Geneva, Switzerland.

== Geography ==
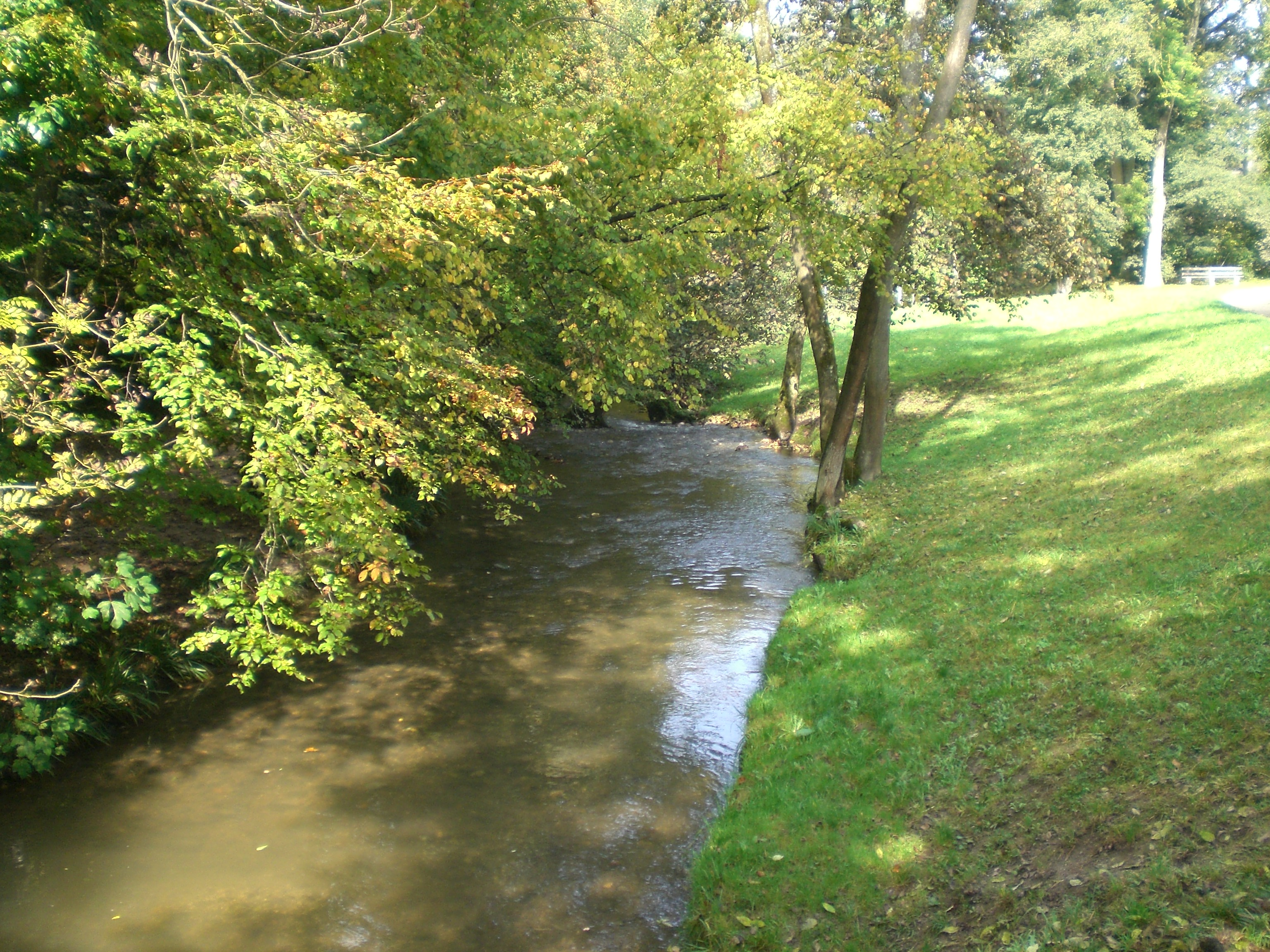
Drize river at Troinex

Troinex has an area, as of 2009, of 3.42 square kilometers (1.32 sq mi). Of this area, 2.29 km^{2} (0.88 sq mi) or 67.0% is used for agricultural purposes, while 0.25 km^{2} (0.097 sq mi) or 7.3% is forested. Of the rest of the land, 0.9 km^{2} (0.35 sq mi) or 26.3% is settled (buildings or roads).

Of the built up area, housing and buildings made up 19.0% and transportation infrastructure made up 5.8%. Out of the forested land, 1.8% of the total land area is heavily forested and 5.6% is covered with orchards or small clusters of trees. Of the agricultural land, 48.8% is used for growing crops and 2.0% is pastures, while 16.1% is used for orchards or vine crops.

The municipality of Troinex consists of the sub-sections or villages of Troinex - village, Troinex - Dessous, Troinex - Dessus, Troinex - Marais and Les Dolens.

== Demographics ==
Largest groups of foreign residents 2013
Nationality	Amount	% total (population)
France	109	4.7
Italy	67	3.0
Portugal	48	2.1
UK	35	1.5
Netherlands	24	1.0
USA	21	0.9
Spain	20	0.9
India	15	0.6
Greece	10	0.4
Germany	9	0.4

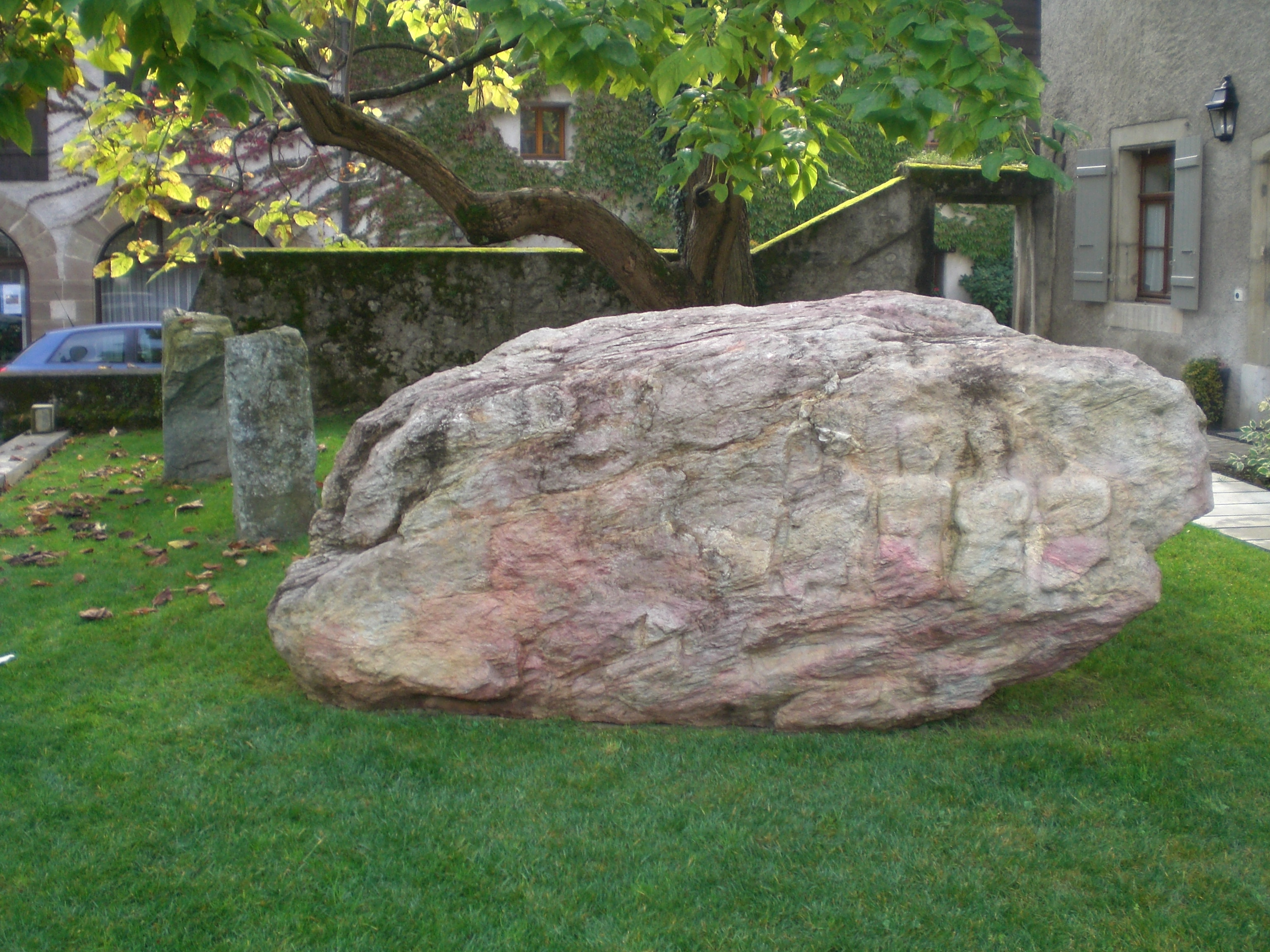
The Pierre aux Dames of Troinex

Troinex has a population (as of December 2020) of 2,551. As of 2008, 20.5% of the population are resident foreign nationals. Over the last 10 years (1999–2009) the population has changed at a rate of 13.8%. It has changed at a rate of 8% due to migration and at a rate of 7.7% due to births and deaths.

Most of the population (as of 2000) speaks French (1,747 or 86.1%), with German being second most common (80 or 3.9%) and English being third (75 or 3.7%). There are 24 people who speak Italian and 2 people who speak Romansh.

As of 2008, the gender distribution of the population was 49.2% male and 50.8% female. The population was made up of 858 Swiss men (39.4% of the population) and 213 (9.8%) non-Swiss men. There were 918 Swiss women (42.2%) and 188 (8.6%) non-Swiss women. Of the population in the municipality 309 or about 15.2% were born in Troinex and lived there in 2000. There were 829 or 40.8% who were born in the same canton, while 319 or 15.7% were born somewhere else in Switzerland, and 491 or 24.2% were born outside of Switzerland.

In 2008 there were 15 live births to Swiss citizens and 5 births to non-Swiss citizens, and in same time span there were 10 deaths of Swiss citizens and 1 non-Swiss citizen death. Ignoring immigration and emigration, the population of Swiss citizens increased by 5 while the foreign population increased by 4. There were 8 Swiss men and 2 Swiss women who emigrated from Switzerland. At the same time, there were 6 non-Swiss men and 14 non-Swiss women who immigrated from another country to Switzerland. The total Swiss population change in 2008 (from all sources, including moves across municipal borders) was an increase of 19 and the non-Swiss population increased by 32 people. This represents a population growth rate of 2.4%.

The age distribution of the population (as of 2000) is children and teenagers (0–19 years old) make up 27.1% of the population, while adults (20–64 years old) make up 59.5% and seniors (over 64 years old) make up 13.4%.

As of 2000, there were 863 people who were single and never married in the municipality. There were 972 married individuals, 80 widows or widowers and 115 individuals who are divorced.

As of 2000, there were 771 private households in the municipality, and an average of 2.5 persons per household. There were 195 households that consist of only one person and 49 households with five or more people. Out of a total of 802 households that answered this question, 24.3% were households made up of just one person and there were 3 adults who lived with their parents. Of the rest of the households, there are 206 married couples without children, 285 married couples with children There were 72 single parents with a child or children. There were 10 households that were made up of unrelated people and 31 households that were made up of some sort of institution or another collective housing.

In 2000 there were 354 single-family homes (or 72.7% of the total) out of a total of 487 inhabited buildings. There were 81 multi-family buildings (16.6%), along with 39 multi-purpose buildings that were mostly used for housing (8.0%) and 13 other use buildings (commercial or industrial) that also had some housing (2.7%). Of the single-family homes 40 were built before 1919, while 55 were built between 1990 and 2000. The greatest number of single-family homes (72) were built between 1981 and 1990. The most multi-family homes (20) were built before 1919 and the next most (17) were built between 1991 and 1995. There were 6 multi-family houses built between 1996 and 2000.

In 2000 there were 820 apartments in the municipality. The most common apartment size was 3 rooms of which there were 181. There were 46 single-room apartments and 317 apartments with five or more rooms. Of these apartments, a total of 731 apartments (89.1% of the total) were permanently occupied, while 78 apartments (9.5%) were seasonally occupied and 11 apartments (1.3%) were empty. As of 2009, the construction rate of new housing units was 3.6 new units per 1000 residents. The vacancy rate for the municipality, in 2010, was 0.23%.

The historical population is given in the following chart:

== Politics ==
In the 2007 federal election the most popular party was the LPS Party which received 27.32% of the vote. The next three most popular parties were the Green Party (17.76%), the SP (13.84%) and the CVP (13.61%). In the federal election, a total of 719 votes were cast, and the voter turnout was 55.9%.

In the 2009 Grand Conseil election, there were a total of 1,316 registered voters of which 681 (51.7%) voted. The most popular party in the municipality for this election was the Libéral with 27.2% of the ballots. In the canton-wide election they received the highest proportion of votes. The second most popular party was the Les Verts (with 13.6%), they were also second in the canton-wide election, while the third most popular party was the PDC (with 12.7%), they were fifth in the canton-wide election.

For the 2009 Conseil d'État election, there were a total of 1,316 registered voters of which 758 (57.6%) voted.

In 2011, all the municipalities held local elections, and in Troinex there were 17 spots open on the municipal council. There were a total of 1,533 registered voters of which 871 (56.8%) voted. Out of the 871 votes, there were 6 blank votes, 5 null or unreadable votes and 116 votes with a name that was not on the list.

== Economy ==
As of 2010, Troinex had an unemployment rate of 4.7%. As of 2008, there were 117 people employed in the primary economic sector and about 15 businesses involved in this sector. 38 people were employed in the secondary sector and there were 10 businesses in this sector. 219 people were employed in the tertiary sector, with 53 businesses in this sector. There were 964 residents of the municipality who were employed in some capacity, of which females made up 42.6% of the workforce.

In 2008 the total number of full-time equivalent jobs was 346. The number of jobs in the primary sector was 112, all of which were in agriculture. The number of jobs in the secondary sector was 37 of which 25 or (67.6%) were in manufacturing and 12 (32.4%) were in construction. The number of jobs in the tertiary sector was 197. In the tertiary sector; 30 or 15.2% were in wholesale or retail sales or the repair of motor vehicles, 6 or 3.0% were in the movement and storage of goods, 18 or 9.1% were in a hotel or restaurant, 2 or 1.0% were in the information industry, 1 was the insurance or financial industry, 11 or 5.6% were technical professionals or scientists, 15 or 7.6% were in education and 18 or 9.1% were in health care.

In 2000, there were 164 workers who commuted into the municipality and 833 workers who commuted away. The municipality is a net exporter of workers, with about 5.1 workers leaving the municipality for every one entering. About 10.4% of the workforce coming into Troinex are coming from outside Switzerland, while 0.0% of the locals commute out of Switzerland for work. Of the working population, 12.7% used public transportation to get to work, and 66.7% used a private car.

== Religion ==
From the 2000 census, 820 or 40.4% were Roman Catholic, while 443 or 21.8% belonged to the Swiss Reformed Church. Of the rest of the population, there were 13 members of an Orthodox church (or about 0.64% of the population), there were 9 individuals (or about 0.44% of the population) who belonged to the Christian Catholic Church, and there were 21 individuals (or about 1.03% of the population) who belonged to another Christian church. There were 32 individuals (or about 1.58% of the population) who were Jewish, and 36 (or about 1.77% of the population) who were Islamic. There were 4 individuals who were Buddhist, 3 individuals who were Hindu and 5 individuals who belonged to another church. 504 (or about 24.83% of the population) belonged to no church, are agnostic or atheist, and 140 individuals (or about 6.90% of the population) did not answer the question.. Also of note, Troinex is also home to the largest Armenian Church in Geneva.

== Education ==
In Troinex about 633 or (31.2%) of the population have completed non-mandatory upper secondary education, and 507 or (25.0%) have completed additional higher education (either university or a Fachhochschule). Of the 507 who completed tertiary schooling, 41.8% were Swiss men, 35.9% were Swiss women, 14.2% were non-Swiss men and 8.1% were non-Swiss women.

During the 2009-2010 school year there were a total of 537 students in the Troinex school system. The education system in the Canton of Geneva allows young children to attend two years of non-obligatory Kindergarten. During that school year, there were 38 children who were in a pre-kindergarten class. The canton's school system provides two years of non-mandatory kindergarten and requires students to attend six years of primary school, with some of the children attending smaller, specialized classes. In Troinex there were 90 students in kindergarten or primary school and 6 students were in the special, smaller classes. The secondary school program consists of three lower, obligatory years of schooling, followed by three to five years of optional, advanced schools. There were 90 lower secondary students who attended school in Troinex. There were 113 upper secondary students from the municipality along with 14 students who were in a professional, non-university track program. An additional 69 students attended a private school.

As of 2000, there were 59 students in Troinex who came from another municipality, while 238 residents attended schools outside the municipality.
