= Adolphe Pictet =

Swiss linguist (1799–1875)

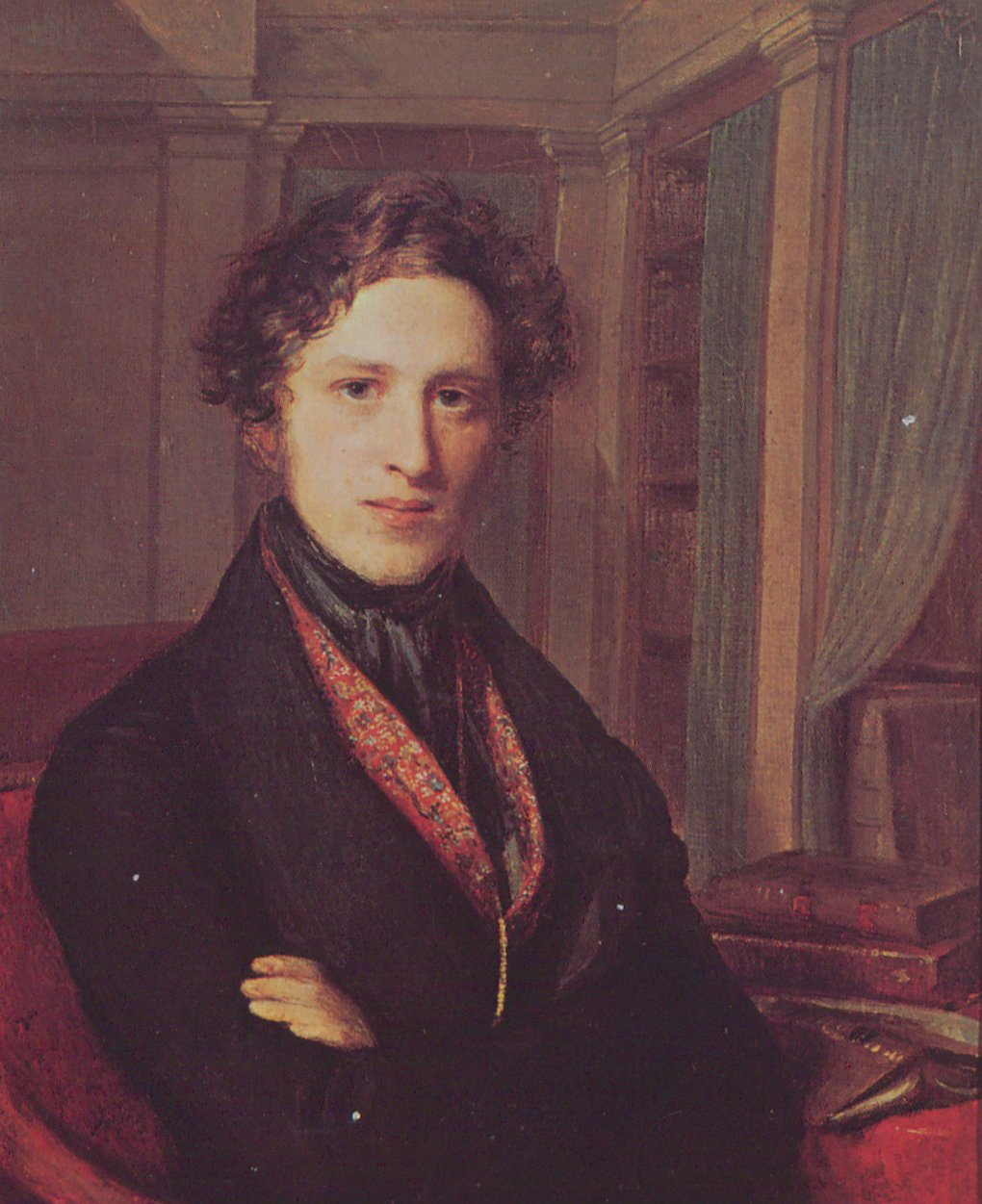
Adolphe Pictet (1824); portrait by Firmin Massot

Adolphe Pictet (11 September 1799 – 20 December 1875) was a Swiss linguist, philologist and ethnologist.

Pictet, the cousin of the biologist Francois Jules Pictet, is well known for his research in the field of comparative linguistics. He played a crucial formative role in the development of Ferdinand de Saussure; "it was Pictet who introduced the thirteen-year-old Saussure to the theoretical foundations of Indo-European linguistics." But he was also "a dedicated champion of German Romanticism and idealist philosophy":

Like French, English, and Russian Romantics since the beginning of the century, he made a journey to Germany, where he became acquainted with A. W. Schlegel (with whom he maintained an important correspondence over the course of many years), Goethe, Hegel, Schleiermacher, and Schelling. ... In the spirit of earlier wars between “romantics” and “classics” (a little outmoded by the 1850s), Pictet envisioned Romanticism, with its embrace of pluralism and freedom of invention, as standing in sharp opposition to Classicism, the embodiment of systemic compactness and uniformity.

Pictet "represented the first, Romantic generation of historical linguists, for whom the history of language went hand in hand with the history of the material and spiritual being of the people who spoke it"; his magnum opus was Origines indo-européennes: Essaie de paléontologie linguistique (1859–63), a "monumental attempt, in the tradition of Friedrich Schlegel and Jakob Grimm, to reconstruct the whole world of the proto-Indo-Europeans."

== Life ==
He was born in Geneva on 11 September 1799 the son of Charles Pictet de Rochemont.

== Works ==
- De l'affinité des langues celtiques avec le Sanscrit (1837)
- Du beau dans la nature (2nd ed. 1875)
- Les origines indo-européennes ou les Aryas primitifs : essai de paléontologie linguistique. 3 vols. Paris: Joël Cherbuliez, 1859–1863 (republished 1878).
