= Charles Pictet de Rochemont =

Swiss diplomat

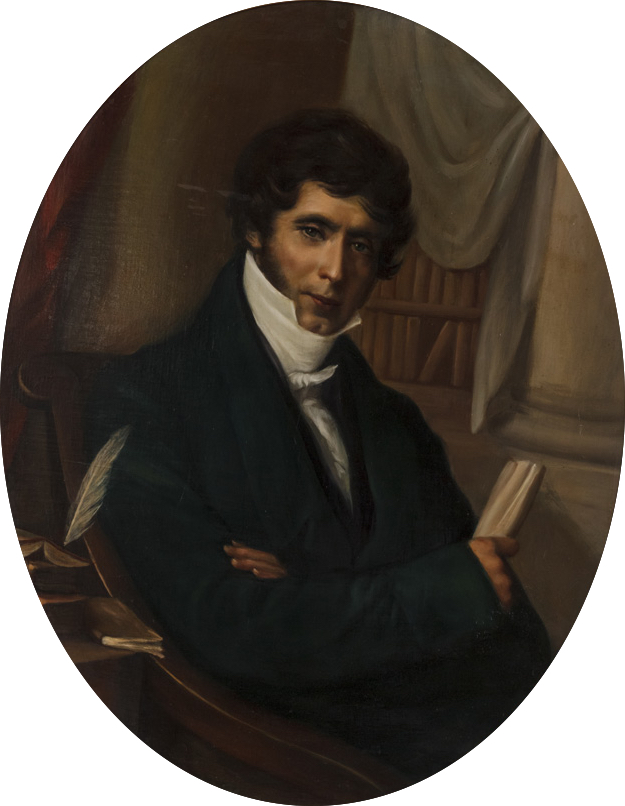
Charles Pictet de Rochemont c. 1815

Charles Pictet de Rochemont (22 September 1755 – 29 December 1824) was a Swiss statesman and diplomat who prepared the declaration of Switzerland's permanent neutrality ratified at the Congress of Vienna in 1815.

== Early life ==
Charles Pictet was born on 22 September 1755 in Geneva, Republic of Geneva, into a patrician family. He was the son of Charles Pictet (1713–1792), a colonel in the service of the Dutch Republic, and Marie Dunant. Pictet studied at the Haldenstein seminary near Chur, Switzerland.

== Early career ==
At age 20, Pictet went to France to pursue a career in the French Army. He served in a Swiss infantry regiment belonging to the Diesbach family from 1775 to 1785. In 1786 he married Adélaïde-Sara de Rochemont, the daughter of a secretary of state of Geneva, and from then on added her name to his own. In 1788, Pictet became a member of Geneva's Council of Two Hundred and was made responsible for reorganizing the urban militia. In 1793, after the overthrow of the oligarchic government in 1792 and the formation of a provisional government, Pictet was elected to the new National Assembly of Geneva. However, he soon resigned his seat due to the increasing radicalization of the provisional government. In August 1794, Pictet was sentenced to one year of house arrest by a revolutionary tribunal. He was acquitted three weeks later following the fall of the extremist government.

For nearly twenty years afterwards, Pictet renounced all political activity. In 1798, he acquired seventy-five hectares of land at Lancy, centered on the present Mairie de Lancy, and became an agronomist and livestock producer. He successfully raised merino sheep imported from Rambouillet to Lancy, even managing to export some to Hungary and Odessa. He also introduced maize as an agrarian innovation to the Geneva region. As a farmer, Pictet wrote a great deal and founded a monthly review entitled Bibliothèque britannique in 1796. From 1796 to 1815, he wrote its agricultural column.

== Diplomat ==
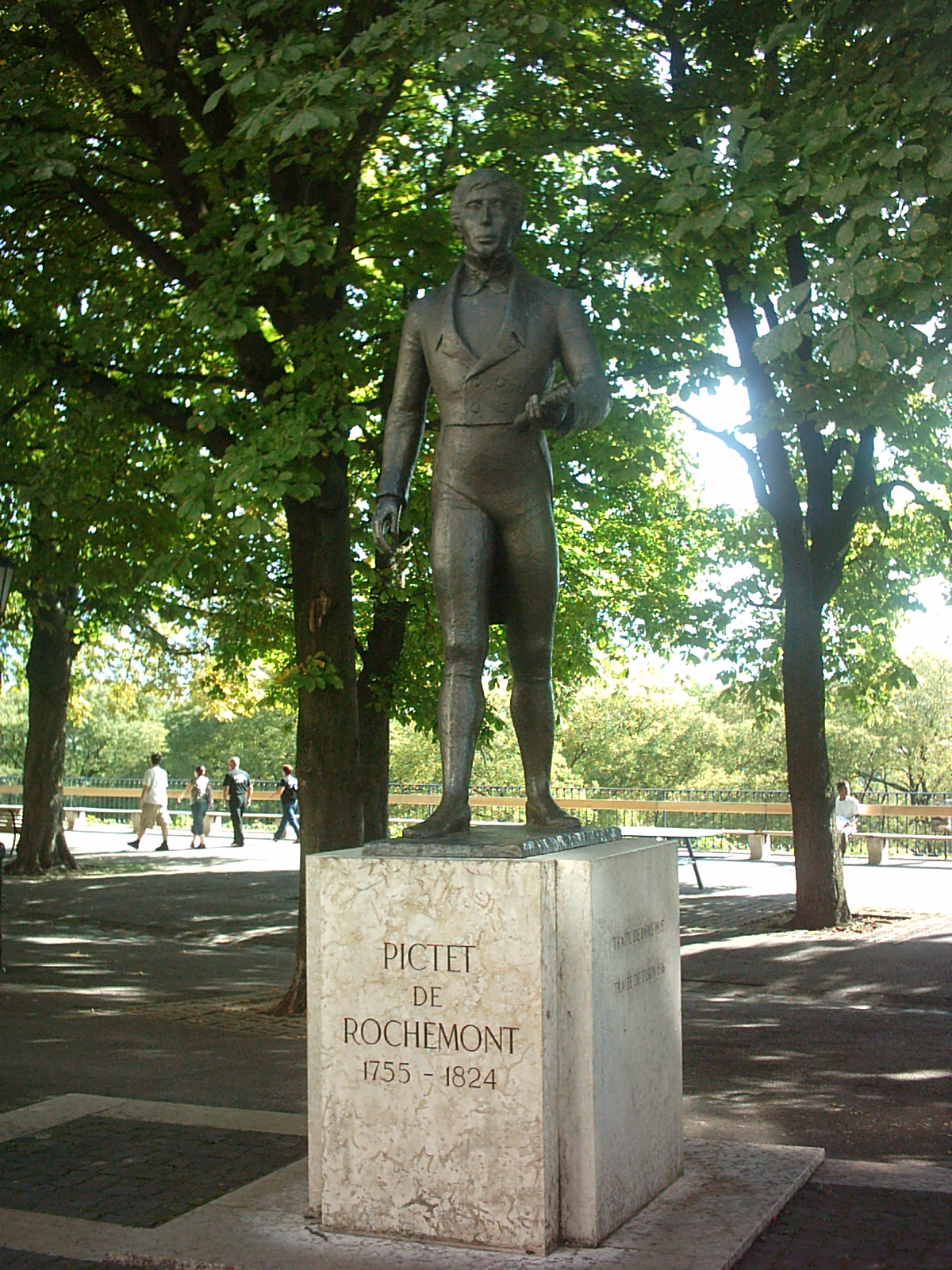
Statue of Pictet in Geneva

The Republic of Geneva had been annexed by France in 1798, following a broader French invasion of Switzerland, becoming the capital of the new department of Léman. By late 1813, as armies of the Sixth Coalition invaded the French Empire, Austrian troops under Ferdinand von Bubna quickly swept through Switzerland. Pictet drafted the proclamation of the provisional government on 30 December 1813, on the eve of the Austrians' entry into Geneva and the restoration of the Republic.

Two apparently contradictory objectives of the new government, much favored by Pictet, were to restore Genevan independence but also to make Geneva part of the Swiss Confederation. To achieve this it was necessary to: (a) to make Genevan territory homogeneous (it consisted of several fragmented communes); and (b) to connect it physically to the canton of Vaud and thus to Switzerland as a whole (Versoix was in France). Pictet participated in the first deputation sent in 1814 to request that the Great Powers support Geneva's position. He then represented Geneva and Switzerland in several rounds of meetings held in Paris (Treaty of Paris) and Vienna (Congress of Vienna) during 1814 and 1815. While the victors were mainly interested in sharing the spoils of war, Pictet de Rochement's political talent and diplomatic skills were aimed precisely at recovering Geneva's independence and joining it to the twenty-one cantons then forming the Swiss Confederation, Valais and the Principality of Neuchâtel having just entered as full and equal cantons.

The first confrontation in Paris was not a success since the French negotiator, Talleyrand, refused to let go of any part of the Pays de Gex. Later, in October 1814 there was the Congress of Vienna. Pictet participated actively in the relevant conclaves and negotiations, not waiting for suitable outcomes to come his way. The idea that Geneva should form part of the Swiss Confederation became a reality on 19 May 1815.

However, Geneva had not yet been able to consolidate its fragmented territory. But now, following the change in Geneva's status, Pictet could count on the backing of the Swiss Government and was given full powers to negotiate. He soon achieved the territorial success he sought.

North of the lake, six communes were transferred from the Pays de Gex, thus giving Geneva its connection with the canton of Vaud. As had already been decided in Vienna and Paris, by the Treaty of Turin in 1816 on the left bank another twenty-three communes were transferred from Savoy and became part of the canton. King Victor Emmanuel I of Sardinia had himself only just recently recovered this territory. This extension of the cantonal land became known as the "communes réunies", hence the road of this name in Grand-Lancy. It was also stated that the non-Swiss customs posts were to be situated at least one league (approximately five kilometers) from the new Swiss frontier, thus creating the "zone franche" on both sides of the canton. Into the bargain, the Great Powers meeting in Paris recognized the "permanent neutrality of Switzerland" and agreed that Swiss neutrality was, indeed, in the common interest of all European countries. Pictet himself wrote the text of the declaration of neutrality.

== Later life and legacy ==
In the summer of 1816 Pictet de Rochemont returned to his sheep and his maize fields having succeeded in his mission. The Swiss Federal Diet expressed its recognition of his services. He died aged 69 on the 29 December 1824 at Geneva.

In December 1951, the Swiss charitable foundation Pro Juventute honoured Pictet de Rochemont in their semi postal series with a 5 centimes plus 5 stamp. Avenue Pictet de Rochemont in Geneva is named after him along with a plaque listing his contributions. In 1968 sculptor Peter Hartmann was commissioned to make a statue of him which was completed and installed the following year on the Promenade de la Treille.

== See also ==
- Bourgeoisie of Geneva
- Pictet Group
