= Raoul Pictet =

Swiss physicist

Raoul-Pierre Pictet
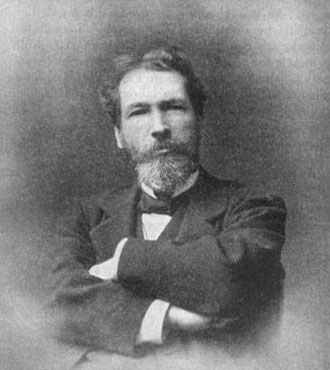
- Raoul-Pierre Pictet
- Born: 4 April 1846; Geneva
- Died: 27 July 1929 (aged 83); Paris
- Known for: Liquid oxygen
- Family: Pictet family
- Awards: Davy Medal (1878)
- Scientific career
- Fields: Physics
- Workplaces: University of Geneva

Signature
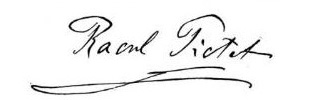

Raoul-Pierre Pictet (4 April 1846 – 27 July 1929) was a Swiss physicist. Pictet is co-credited with French scientist Louis-Paul Cailletet as the first to produce liquid oxygen in 1877.

== Biography ==
Pictet was born in Geneva. He served as professor in the university of that city. He devoted himself largely to problems involving the production of low temperatures and the liquefaction and solidification of gases.

On December 22, 1877, the Academy of Sciences in Paris received a telegram from Pictet in Geneva reading as follows: Oxygen liquefied to-day under 320 atmospheres and 140 degrees of cold by combined use of sulfurous and carbonic acid. This announcement was almost simultaneous with that of Cailletet who had liquefied oxygen by a completely different process.

Pictet died in Paris in 1929.

== Works ==
- Pictet, Raoul (1878). Mémoire sur la liquefaction de l'oxygène, la liquefaction et la solidification de l'hydrogène: et sur les théories des changement des corps. J. Sandoz.
- Pictet, Raoul (1879). Synthèse de la chaleur: Résumé des communications faites à la réunion de la Société helvétique des sciences naturelles tenue à Saint-Gall. H. Georg.
- Nouvelles machines frigorifiques basées sur l'emploi de phénomènes physicochimiques (1895)
- Étude critique du matérialisme et du spiritualisme par la physique expérimentale (1896)
- L'acétylène (1896)
- Le carbide (1896)
- Zur mechanischen Theorie der Explosivstoffe (1902)
- Die Theorie der Apparate zur Herstellung flüssiger Luft mit Entspannung (1903)
- Pictet, Raoul (1879). Synthèse de la chaleur: Résumé des communications faites à la réunion de la Société helvétique des sciences naturelles tenue à Saint-Gall. H. Georg.

== See also ==
- Liquefaction of gases
- Timeline of low-temperature technology
- Pictet Family Archives (in French) — includes a family tree since 1344
- Pictet's apparatus
- Production of oxygen under pressure in a retort
- Two pre-cooling refrigeration cycles: 1. SO_{2}(-10 °C) 2. CO_{2} (-78 °C) oxygen flow is pre–cooled by the means of heat exchangers and expands to atmosphere via a hand valve
