= Yablonovka, Saratov Oblast =

Rural locality in Rovensky District, Saratov Oblast, Russia

Coordinates: 51°03′36″N 46°01′12″E

Yablonovka (Russian: Яблоновка) is a rural locality (a selo) in Rovensky District of Saratov Oblast, Russia, located about 50 kilometers (31 mi) south of the city of Engels on the left bank of the Volga River.

It was founded by Volga Germans in 1767 and until 1941 was known as Lauwe; other German names for the settlement were Laube and Schönfeld.

== History ==
It was founded on August 19, 1767 by the colonial agency LeRoy and Pictet and 169 Lutheran immigrants from Germany, following Catherine the Great's manifesto of July 22, 1763, which guaranteed settlers in the Russian Empire free transport and monetary support in reaching their new colonies, free choice of settlement location, freedom of trade, freedom from taxation for thirty years, interest-free loans for ten years, freedom of religion, freedom from conscription in perpetuity, and freedom of return to their homelands, but at their own expense. The settlement was named Lauwe after the first elder of the village. Its original demarcation consisted of 4,455 desiatinas. The first forty-seven settler families came from Bavaria (Nuremberg), Baden, Hesse (Darmstadt and Neu-Isenburg), the Palatinate, the Rhineland, Saxony, and Brandenburg. It was one of the ten colonies established by LeRoy and Pictet south of Saratov on the "meadow" (eastern) side of the Volga and along its eastern tributary, the Terlyk. In later years, it was also known under the German names of Laube and Schönfeld.

In 1774, Lauwe was looted by the rebels of the peasant rebellion led by Yemelyan Pugachev.

The German colonists' special status was nullified under the Russification measures which began as part of Tsar Alexander II's reforms and continued under his successor, Alexander III, and some of the male colonists who had been conscripted were killed in the Russo-Turkish War of 1877–1888. Between 1871 and 1914, some of the Volga Germans left Lauwe and emigrated to North and South America.

When Nazi Germany broke the Molotov–Ribbentrop Pact and invaded the Soviet Union in Operation Barbarossa in 1941, Stalin abolished the Volga German Autonomous Soviet Socialist Republic and signed an order of banishment against ethnic Germans, which took effect on September 16, 1941. The population of Lauwe was exiled to the Kazakh SSR and the village was renamed Yablonovka ('apple-tree village', after a nearby ravine where apple trees were growing wild) in 1941. The log houses built by the ethnic Germans were torn down and used as firewood.

Post-war hopes for the re-establishment of the Volga German ASSR and return of the deportees were dashed by a February 21, 1992 decree of Boris Yeltsin in Saratov, and Yablonovka is now populated primarily by Russians.

== Demographics ==
The following table shows population development in Lauwe up to 1931.

Year	Population	Germans
1767	169	
1773	150	
1788	165	
1798	244	
1816	540	
1834	600	
1850	927	
1859	1,103	
1889	1,548	
1897	1,695	1,654
1904	2,412	
1910	2,588	
1926	1,639	1,607
1931	1,850	1,818
