= Pictet–Spengler reaction =

Chemical reaction including condensation

Pictet-Spengler reaction
Named after	Amé Pictet; Theodor Spengler
Reaction type	Ring forming reaction

Identifiers
RSC ontology ID	RXNO:0000059

The Pictet–Spengler reaction is a chemical reaction in which a β-arylethylamine undergoes condensation with an aldehyde or ketone followed by ring closure. The reaction was first discovered in 1911 by Amé Pictet and Theodor Spengler (22 February 1886 – 18 August 1965). Traditionally, an acidic catalyst in protic solvent was employed with heating; however, the reaction has been shown to work in aprotic media in superior yields and sometimes without acid catalysis. The Pictet–Spengler reaction can be considered a special case of the Mannich reaction, which follows a similar reaction pathway. The driving force for this reaction is the electrophilicity of the iminium ion generated from the condensation of the aldehyde and amine under acid conditions. This explains the need for an acid catalyst in most cases, as the imine is not electrophilic enough for ring closure but the iminium ion is capable of undergoing the reaction.

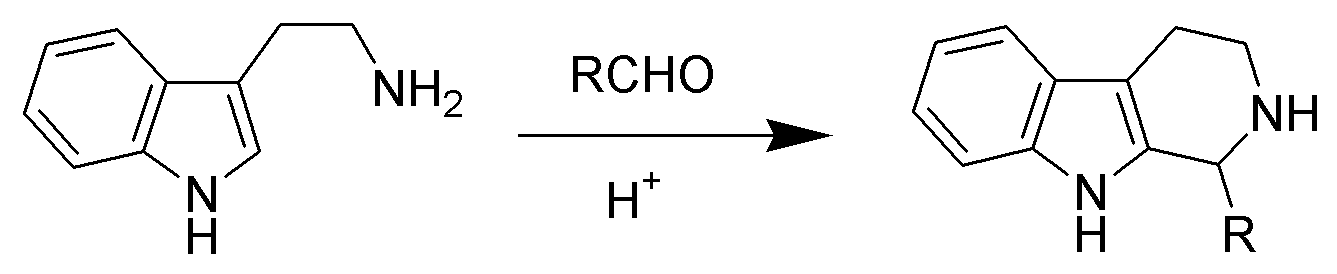
The Pictet–Spengler reaction

The Pictet–Spengler reaction is widespread in both industry and biosynthesis. It has remained an important reaction in the fields of alkaloid and organic synthesis since its inception, where it has been employed in the development of many beta-carbolines. Natural Pictet–Spengler reaction typically employ an enzyme, such as strictosidine synthase. Pictet–Spengler products can be isolated from many products initially derived from nature, including foodstuffs such as soy sauce and ketchup. In such cases it is common to find the amino acid tryptophan and various aldoses used as the biological feedstock.

Nucleophilic aromatic rings such as indole or pyrrole give products in high yields and mild conditions, while less nucleophilic aromatic rings such as a phenyl group give poorer yields or require higher temperatures and strong acid. The original Pictet–Spengler reaction was the reaction of phenethylamine and dimethoxymethane, catalysed by hydrochloric acid forming a tetrahydroisoquinoline.

The Pictet–Spengler reaction has been applied to solid-phase combinatorial chemistry with great success.

An analogous reaction with an aryl-β-ethanol is called oxa-Pictet–Spengler reaction.

== Reaction mechanism ==
The reaction mechanism occurs by initial formation of an iminium ion (2) followed by electrophilic addition at the 3-position, in accordance with the expected nucleophilicity of indoles, to give the spirocycle 3. After migration of the best migrating group, deprotonation gives the product (5).

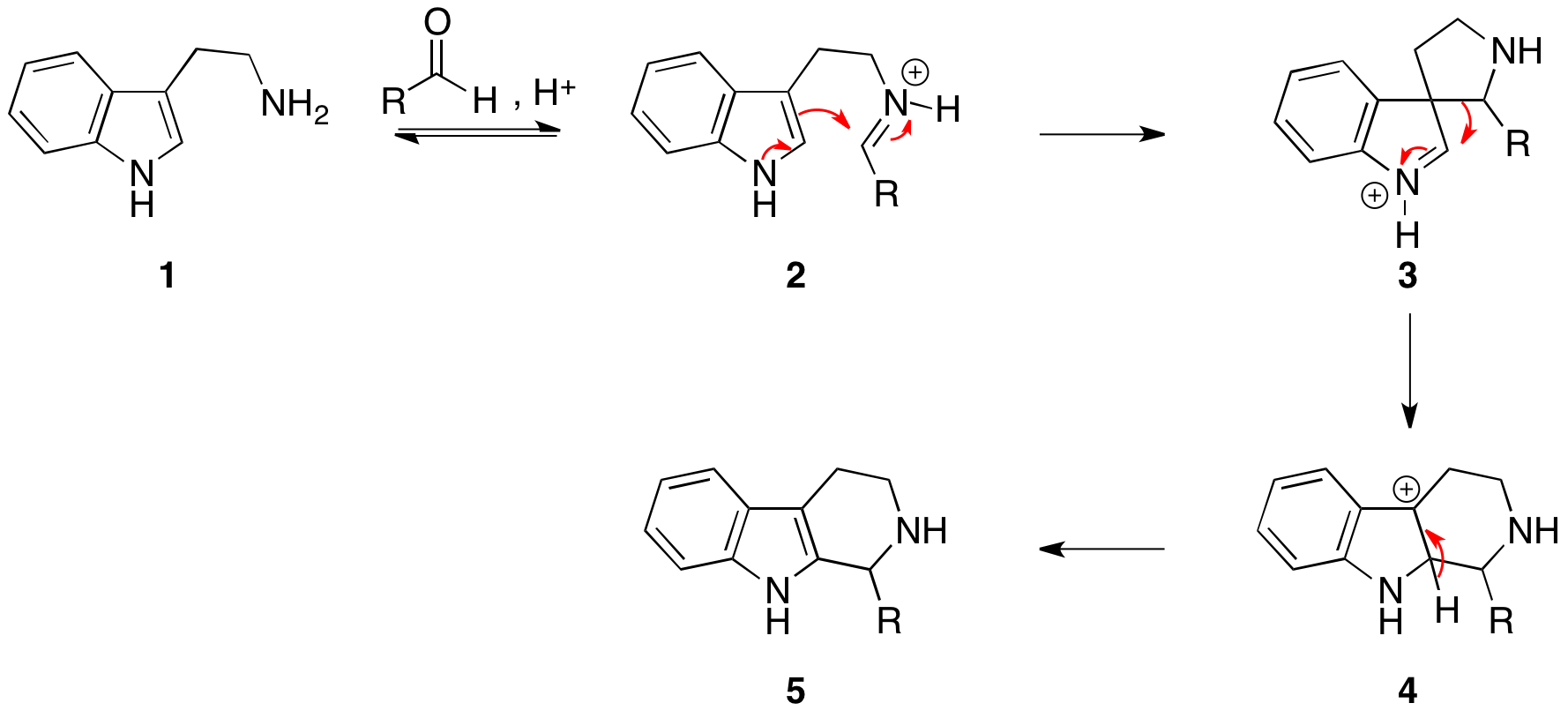
The mechanism of the Pictet–Spengler reaction

== Variations ==
=== Pictet–Spengler tetrahydroisoquinoline synthesis ===
Replacing an indole with a 3,4-dimethoxyphenyl group give the reaction named the Pictet–Spengler tetrahydroisoquinoline synthesis. Reaction conditions are generally harsher than the indole variant, and require refluxing conditions with strong acids like hydrochloric acid, trifluoroacetic acid or superacids.

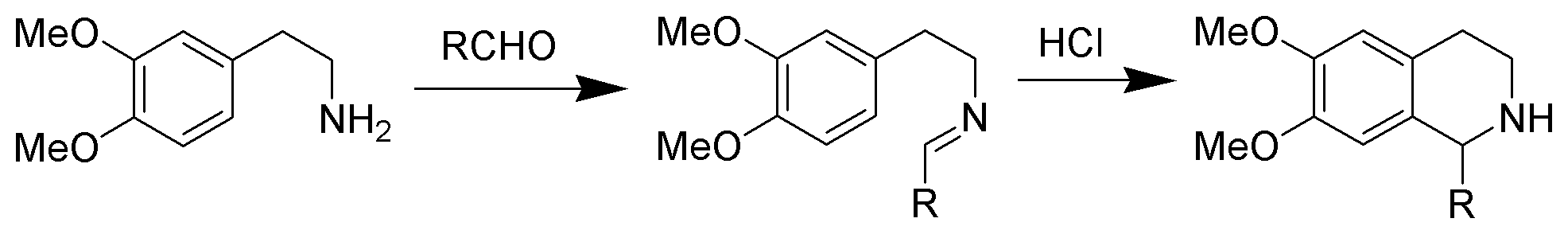
The Pictet–Spengler isoquinoline synthesis

=== N-acyliminium ion Pictet–Spengler reaction ===
Instead of catalyzing the Pictet–Spengler cyclization with strong acid, one can acylate the imine forming the intermediate N-acyliminium ion. The N-acyliminium ion is a very powerful electrophile and most aromatic ring systems will cyclize under mild conditions with good yields.

The N-acyliminium Pictet–Spengler reaction

Tadalafil is synthesized via the N-acyliminium Pictet–Spengler reaction. This reaction can also be catalyzed by AuCl_{3} and AgOTf.

=== Asymmetric Pictet–Spengler reaction ===
When the Pictet–Spengler reaction is performed with an aldehyde other than formaldehyde, a new chiral center is created. Several substrate- or auxiliary-controlled diastereoselective Pictet–Spengler reactions have been developed. Additionally, List et al. have published a chiral Brønsted–Lowry acid that catalyzes asymmetric Pictet–Spengler reactions.

Tryptophans: diastereocontrolled reaction
The reaction of enantiopure tryptophan or its short-chain alkylesters leads to 1,2,3,4-tetrahydro-β-carbolines in which a new chiral center at C-1 adopts either a cis or trans configuration towards the C-3 carboxyl group. The cis conduction is kinetically controlled, i.e. it is performed at lower temperatures. At higher temperatures the reaction becomes reversible and usually favours racemisation. 1,3-trans dominated products can be obtained with N_{b}-benzylated tryptophans, which are accessible by reductive amination. The benzyl group can be removed hydrogenolytically afterwards. As a rough rule, ^{13}C NMR signals for C1 and C3 are downfield shifted in cis products relative to trans products (see steric compression effect).

== See also ==
- Bischler–Napieralski reaction
- Pomeranz–Fritsch reaction
