= Pictet Group =

Swiss multinational private bank and financial services company

- Industry: Private banking and financial services
- Founded: 23 July 1805; 220 years ago
- Founders: Jacob-Michel-François de Candolle and Jacques-Henry Mallet
- Headquarters: Geneva, Switzerland
- Number of locations: 31
- Area served: Worldwide
- Key people: François Pictet; Laurent Ramsey; Elif Aktuğ; Raymond Sagayam; Marc Pictet; Sébastien Eisinger; Sven Holstenson
- Services: Asset management, wealth management, investment funds, asset services and trading
- Net income: CHF 667 million
- AUM: ▲CHF 757 billion
- Total assets: CHF 42.9 billion
- Number of employees: 5,507
- Capital ratio: 20.9 percent
- Rating: Moody's: P-1/Aa2; Fitch: F1+/AA-
- Website: pictet.com

The Pictet Group, known as Pictet, is a Swiss multinational private bank and financial services company founded in Switzerland. Headquartered in Geneva, it is one of the largest Swiss banks and primarily offers services in wealth management, asset management, and asset servicing, to private clients and institutions.

The Pictet Group employs more than 5,500 people, including 900 investment managers. It has a network of 31 offices in financial services centres, including registered banks in Geneva, Frankfurt, Nassau, Hong Kong, and Singapore.

Pictet does not engage in investment banking, nor does it extend commercial loans. According to its 2025 Annual Review, Pictet had CHF 757 billion of assets under management or custody, with its total capital ratio significantly exceeding the levels demanded by Swiss regulators. Banque Pictet & Cie SA is rated Prime-1/Aa2 by Moody's, and F1+/AA- by Fitch.

== History ==
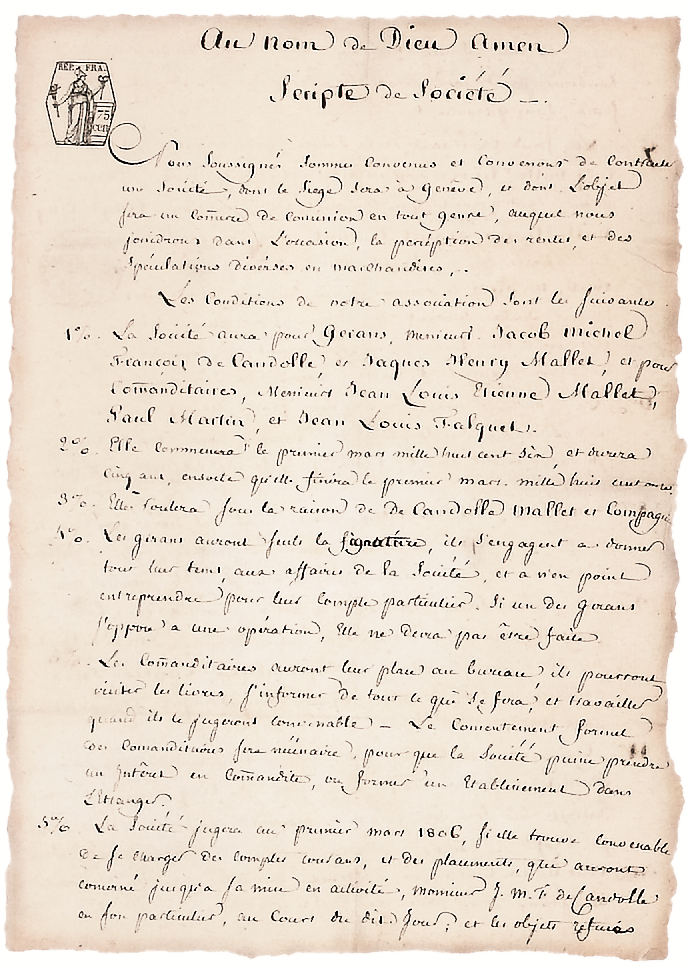
The Scripte de société (memorandum of association) for the Banque De Candolle Mallet & Cie

Pictet traces its origin to the foundation of Banque De Candolle Mallet & Cie in Geneva on 23 July 1805. On that day, Jacob-Michel-François de Candolle and Jacques-Henry Mallet signed, with three limited partners, a Scripte de Société (memorandum of association) to form a partnership. Like all Geneva banks at the time, it started out trading in goods but soon abandoned trading to concentrate on assisting clients in their financial and commercial business and advising them on managing their wealth. By the 1830s, it held a broad range of securities on behalf of clients, to diversify their risks.

On the death of de Candolle in 1841, his wife’s nephew Edouard Pictet joined the partnership, and the name Pictet has remained with the bank ever since. Between 1890 and 1929, the Bank went through a period of substantial growth, the number of employees rising from 12 to more than 80 over 30 years. Although the Pictet family had been intimately engaged with the bank since the mid-19th century, it was only in 1926 that the company changed its name to Pictet & Cie.

After a period of relative stagnation marked by the Great Depression of the 1930s and the Second World War, Pictet began to expand in the 1950s as the Western world entered a prolonged period of prosperity and economic growth. In the late 1960s, the Bank embarked on the new business of institutional asset management, which has since grown to account for around half of its total assets under management. In 1974, it opened an office in Montreal, the first of its current network of 28 offices around the world. Its workforce of 70 staff in 1950 rose to 300 by 1980.

As of 2011, Pictet was Switzerland’s third largest wealth management company, and also one of Europe’s largest banks in private hands.

In 2014, Pictet changed its legal structure from a simple partnership to a corporate partnership (société en commandite par actions), which acts as a holding company for its global business. Pictet did not publish its annual results during its 209 years as a simple partnership, then published annual results for the first time upon becoming a corporate partnership. This enabled the company to manage its businesses in an international environment, and also allowed the seven partners who are owner-managers of Pictet to preserve the rules of succession, which have remained unchanged for more than 200 years. Under those rules, ownership cannot be passed down to partners’ children: it is a temporary status that ends once a partner has retired. Partners hand over ownership of Pictet in batches every five to 10 years so that there are always partners from three generations connected to the family, to avoid problems that can arise with generational change. To date, there have been only 47 partners.

Pictet operates by assigning business activities and key functions like human resources, risk control, and legal affairs to different partners. Small committees supervise the various corporate activities so that no single partner is solely responsible for an entire area. Pictet Group’s senior partner, who is the most senior partner at the time of appointment, has oversight for areas concerning central corporate functions, such as HR, auditing, risk, and compliance. As primus inter pares, he chairs the partners' meetings and represents Pictet inside and outside the bank.

== Structure ==
=== Wealth management ===
Pictet Wealth Management provides private banking for owners of larger fortunes and family office services for families of exceptional wealth. The services include dedicated asset management, advice on strategy and investment selection, execution in global markets, safeguarding client assets, and continuous monitoring. For hedge funds, private equity, and real estate investments, Pictet Alternative Advisors, an independent unit, selects third-party investment managers to construct alternative investment portfolios for investors. Pictet Investment Office is a special unit within Pictet that only looks after the wealthiest and most sophisticated clients of the bank and invests their assets into liquid and illiquid opportunities, in public and private markets following a high-risk/return strategy across the capital structure.

Operating out of 22 Pictet offices worldwide, Pictet Wealth Management had CHF 285 bn of assets under management on 31 December 2025 and employed around 1260 full-time equivalent employees, including 346 private bankers.

On 26 November 2012, it was reported that Pictet's wealth management unit was a target of the United States Department of Justice (DOJ), suspected of having aided tax evasion. On 4 December 2023, Pictet concluded a final settlement agreement with the DOJ to resolve a legacy investigation relating to services provided by its private banking business to US taxpayer clients between 2008 and 2014. Under a three-year deferred prosecution agreement, Pictet agreed to pay a total sum of USD 122.9 (CHF 106.8) million, of which USD 38.9 (CHF 33.8) million is a fine.

=== Asset management ===
Pictet Asset Management manages assets for institutional investors and investment funds, including large pension funds, sovereign wealth funds, and financial institutions. It also manages assets for individual investors through an extensive range of mandates, products, and services. It provides clients with active and quantitative support for managing equities, fixed income, multi-asset and alternative strategies.

Since 1997, the department has been developing Socially Responsible Investments (SRI). It now manages SRI core equity portfolios for all major markets. It has also taken a thematic approach, focusing on environmental themes or sectors such as clean energy and timber that are key to the concept of sustainability.

Operating out of 18 Pictet offices worldwide, Pictet Asset Management had CHF 267 bn of assets under management on 31 December 2025 and employed around 1167 full-time equivalent employees, including 405 investment professionals.

=== Asset services ===
Pictet Asset Services provides a range of services for asset managers, pension funds, and banks. These include fund services for institutional or private investors and independent asset managers; custody services in more than 80 countries; and round-the-clock trading across all significant asset classes by Pictet Global Markets. Fund services include setting up funds, administering them, and fund governance. With eight booking centres accessing the single global platform, Pictet Asset Services had CHF 256 bn of assets in custody on 31 December 2025 and employed around 241 full-time equivalent employees.

== Prix Pictet ==
In 2008, Pictet launched the Prix Pictet, an award for photography highlighting societal interactions and problems. Each year, nominated photographers are invited to submit a series of pictures on a chosen theme, from "Water" (2008) to "Storm" (2024). The winner is selected by an independent jury led by David King. Kofi Annan was president of the Prix Pictet from its founding in 2008 until he died in 2018.

== Tax misconduct ==
In December 2023, Pictet agreed to pay $123 million to US authorities after admitting to helping clients illegally shield assets from tax in secret accounts from 2008 to 2014.

According to the US Department of Justice, the bank "conspired with US taxpayers and others to hide more than $5.6 billion in 1,637 secret bank accounts in Switzerland and elsewhere and to conceal the income generated in those accounts from the IRS."

== See also ==
- Banking in Switzerland
