= List of members of the Federal Assembly from the Canton of Geneva =

Coat of Arms

This is a list of members of both houses of the Federal Assembly from the Canton of Geneva.

== Members of the Council of States ==
Councillor (Party)	Election	Councillor (Party)
Antoine Carteret; Free Democratic Party; 1848–1849	Appointed	James Fazy; Free Democratic Party; 1848–1849
Jean-Henri Duchosal; Free Democratic Party; 1849–1850	Appointed	Abraham-L. Tourte; Free Democratic Party; 1849–1851
Philippe Camperio; Free Democratic Party; 1850–1851	Appointed	Abraham-L. Tourte; Free Democratic Party; 1849–1851
Jean-Henri Duchosal; Free Democratic Party; 1851–1853	Appointed	James Fazy; Free Democratic Party; 1851–1854
Jean-Adolphe-Ch. Fontanel; Free Democratic Party; 1853–1853	Appointed	James Fazy; Free Democratic Party; 1851–1854
Joseph Girard; Free Democratic Party; 1854–1854	Appointed	James Fazy; Free Democratic Party; 1851–1854
A.-Théodore Lissignol; Free Democratic Party; 1854–1855	Appointed	Théodore-Ami Piguet; Indépendant (rad.diss.) (GE); 1854–1855
A.-Théodore Lissignol; Free Democratic Party; 1854–1855	Appointed	François-Jules Pictet; Independent; 1856–1856
James Fazy; Free Democratic Party; 1856–1857	Appointed	Carl-Ch. Vogt; Free Democratic Party; 1856–1861
Jules-J.-F.-M. Vuy; Free Democratic Party; 1857–1859	Appointed	Carl-Ch. Vogt; Free Democratic Party; 1856–1861
Alexandre Félix Alméras; Free Democratic Party; 1860–1862	Appointed	Carl-Ch. Vogt; Free Democratic Party; 1856–1861
Alexandre Félix Alméras; Free Democratic Party; 1860–1862	Appointed	Moïse Vautier; Free Democratic Party; 1861–1862
Charles-M. Friderich; Free Democratic Party; 1863–1863	Appointed	Moïse Vautier; Free Democratic Party; 1861–1862
Philippe Camperio; Free Democratic Party; 1863–1866	Appointed	Guillaume-Henri Dufour; Conservative; 1863–1866
Jean Ch., dit John Braillard; Free Democratic Party; 1866–1869	Appointed	Auguste-E. Turrettini; Liberal Party; 1866–1870
Philippe Camperio; Free Democratic Party; 1869–1870	Appointed	Auguste-E. Turrettini; Liberal Party; 1866–1870
Carl-Ch. Vogt; Free Democratic Party; 1870–1871	Appointed	Gaspard-J. Zurlinden; Free Democratic Party; 1870–1872
James Fazy; Free Democratic Party; 1871–1872	Appointed	Gaspard-J. Zurlinden; Free Democratic Party; 1870–1872
James Fazy; Free Democratic Party; 1871–1872	Appointed	Charles-Amédée Girod; Party unknown 1872–1872
Emile Cambessedès; Free Democratic Party; 1872–1875	Appointed	J.-H.-Alfred Vaucher; Free Democratic Party; 1872–1876
B.-Benjamin Dufernex; Free Democratic Party; 1875–1878	Appointed	J.-H.-Alfred Vaucher; Free Democratic Party; 1872–1876
B.-Benjamin Dufernex; Free Democratic Party; 1875–1878	Appointed	J.-Pierre Moriaud; Free Democratic Party; 1876–1878
Gustave Ador; Swiss Democrats; 1878–1880	Appointed	J.-M.-Albert Wessel; Liberal Party; 1878–1880
Georges-S. Favon; Free Democratic Party; 1880–1881	Appointed	Moïse Vautier; Free Democratic Party; 1880–1881
B.-Benjamin Dufernex; Free Democratic Party; 1881–1883	Appointed	L. Adrien Lachenal; Free Democratic Party; 1881–1884
Marc Héridier; Free Democratic Party; 1883–1884	Appointed	L. Adrien Lachenal; Free Democratic Party; 1881–1884
P.-Alexandre Gavard; Free Democratic Party; 1884–1891	Appointed	J.-Pierre Moriaud; Free Democratic Party; 1884–1890
P.-Alexandre Gavard; Free Democratic Party; 1884–1891	Appointed	Frédéric-P. Raisin; Liberal Party; 1890–1892
A.-Edouard Odier; Liberal Party; 1891–1892	Appointed	Frédéric-P. Raisin; Liberal Party; 1890–1892
Eberhard A. Binder; Free Democratic Party; 1892–1893	Appointed	Marc Héridier; Free Democratic Party; 1892–1893
A.-Edouard Odier; Liberal Party; 1893–1896	Appointed	M.-Eugène Richard; Liberal Party; 1893–1914
P.-Alexandre Gavard; Free Democratic Party; 1896–1898	Appointed	M.-Eugène Richard; Liberal Party; 1893–1914
M.-Eugène Ritzchel; Free Democratic Party; 1899–1899	Appointed	M.-Eugène Richard; Liberal Party; 1893–1914
L. Adrien Lachenal; Free Democratic Party; 1900–1918	Appointed	M.-Eugène Richard; Liberal Party; 1893–1914
L. Adrien Lachenal; Free Democratic Party; 1900–1918	Appointed	Jacques-S. Rutty; Liberal Party; 1914–1922
G.-Ph.-Henri Fazy; Free Democratic Party; 1918–1920	Appointed	Jacques-S. Rutty; Liberal Party; 1914–1922
Jean-C. Sigg; Independent; 1921–1922	Appointed	Jacques-S. Rutty; Liberal Party; 1914–1922
Charles Burklin; Social Democratic Party; 1922–1928	Appointed	Alexandre Moriaud; Free Democratic Party; 1922–1931
Jean-Martin Naef; Union de défense économique (GE); 1928–1931	Appointed	Alexandre Moriaud; Free Democratic Party; 1922–1931
Charles Burklin; Social Democratic Party; 1931–1932	Appointed	Albert Malche; Free Democratic Party; 1931–1951
Auguste-Edouard-Frédéric Martin; Liberal Party; 1933–1942	Appointed	Albert Malche; Free Democratic Party; 1931–1951
Albert-Gustave Pictet; Liberal Party; 1942–1947	Appointed	Albert Malche; Free Democratic Party; 1931–1951
Marcel Raisin; Liberal Party; 1947–1949	Appointed	Albert Malche; Free Democratic Party; 1931–1951
Albert-Edouard Picot; Liberal Party; 1949–1955		Albert Malche; Free Democratic Party; 1931–1951
Albert-Edouard Picot; Liberal Party; 1949–1955	1951	Adrien Lachenal; Free Democratic Party; 1951–1955
Victor Gautier; Liberal Party; 1955–1963	1955	François Perréard; Free Democratic Party; 1955–1963
Victor Gautier; Liberal Party; 1955–1963	1959	François Perréard; Free Democratic Party; 1955–1963
Eric Choisy; Liberal Party; 1963–1971	1963	Alfred Borel; Free Democratic Party; 1963–1971
Eric Choisy; Liberal Party; 1963–1971	1967	Alfred Borel; Free Democratic Party; 1963–1971
Olivier Reverdin; Liberal Party; 1971–1979	1971	Lise Girardin; Free Democratic Party; 1971–1975
Olivier Reverdin; Liberal Party; 1971–1979	1975	Willy Donzé; Social Democratic Party; 1975–1983
Monique Bauer-Lagier; Liberal Party; 1979–1987	1979	Willy Donzé; Social Democratic Party; 1975–1983
Monique Bauer-Lagier; Liberal Party; 1979–1987	1983	Robert Ducret; Free Democratic Party; 1983–1991
André Gautier; Liberal Party; 1987–1991	1987	Robert Ducret; Free Democratic Party; 1983–1991
Gilbert Coutau; Liberal Party; 1991–1995	1991	Gilles Petitpierre; Free Democratic Party; 1991–1995
Christiane Brunner; Social Democratic Party; 1995–2007	1995	Françoise Saudan; Free Democratic Party; 1995–2007
Christiane Brunner; Social Democratic Party; 1995–2007	1999	Françoise Saudan; Free Democratic Party; 1995–2007
Christiane Brunner; Social Democratic Party; 1995–2007	2003	Françoise Saudan; Free Democratic Party; 1995–2007
Liliane Maury Pasquier; Social Democratic Party; 2007–present	2007	Robert Cramer; Green Party; 2007–2019
Liliane Maury Pasquier; Social Democratic Party; 2007–present	2011	Robert Cramer; Green Party; 2007–2019
Liliane Maury Pasquier; Social Democratic Party; 2007–present	2015	Robert Cramer; Green Party; 2007–2019
Carlo Sommaruga; Social Democratic Party; 2019–present	2019	Lisa Mazzone; Green Party; 2019–2023
Carlo Sommaruga; Social Democratic Party; 2019–present	2023	Mauro Poggia; Geneva Citizens' Movement; 2023–present

== Members of the National Council ==
Councillor	Party	Term start	Term end
Alexandre Félix Alméras	FDP/PRD	1848	1854
Jean-Jacques Castoldi	FDP/PRD	1848	1851
Joseph Girard	FDP/PRD	1848	1851
Philippe Camperio	FDP/PRD	1851	1863
Abraham-L. Tourte	FDP/PRD	1851	1854
Jean-Jacques Darier	Conservative	1854	1857
Guillaume-Henri Dufour	Conservative	1854	1857
Jean-Jacques Challet-Venel	FDP/PRD	1857	1864
James Fazy	FDP/PRD	1857	1866
Moïse Vautier	FDP/PRD	1863	1866
Jules-J.-F.-M. Vuy	FDP/PRD	1863	1866
Charles-M. Friderich	FDP/PRD	1864	1872
Philippe Camperio	FDP/PRD	1866	1869
François-Jules Pictet	Ind.	1866	1872
J.-M.-Albert Wessel	LPS/PLS	1866	1869
Antoine Carteret	FDP/PRD	1869	1878
Moïse Vautier	FDP/PRD	1869	1878
Jean-Jacques Challet-Venel	FDP/PRD	1872	1878
Gustave-Jules Pictet	Ind.	1872	1874
Charles-L. Chalumeau	FDP/PRD	1875	1878
Arthur Chenevière	Conservative	1878	1884
G.-François-Isaac Mayor	FDP/PRD	1878	1881
Gustave-Jules Pictet	Ind.	1878	1881
Carl-Ch. Vogt	FDP/PRD	1878	1881
Antoine Carteret	FDP/PRD	1881	1889
Georges-S. Favon	FDP/PRD	1881	1893
J.-Pierre Moriaud	FDP/PRD	1881	1884
Moïse Vautier	FDP/PRD	1881	1884
Jean-Etienne Dufour	LPS/PLS	1884	1893
L. Adrien Lachenal	FDP/PRD	1884	1892
Gustave-Jules Pictet	Ind.	1884	1887
P.-M. Ernest Pictet	LPS/PLS	1887	1890
Gustave Ador	LPS/PLS	1889	1902
M.-Eugène Richard	LPS/PLS	1890	1893
Louis Charrière	FDP/PRD	1893	1896
P.-M. Ernest Pictet	LPS/PLS	1893	1893
F.-Alexandre Ramu	LPS/PLS	1893	1896
Jacques-S. Rutty	LPS/PLS	1893	1896
Georges-S. Favon	FDP/PRD	1894	1902
G.-Ph.-Henri Fazy	FDP/PRD	1896	1899
Alfred-L. Vincent	FDP/PRD	1896	1906
A.-Edouard Odier	LPS/PLS	1897	1899
M.-Eugène Ritzchel	FDP/PRD	1899	1902
Alexandre Triquet	FDP/PRD	1899	1902
Gustave Ador	LPS/PLS	1902	1917
Marc-Joseph Bonnet	FDP/PRD	1902	1908
G.-Ph.-Henri Fazy	FDP/PRD	1902	1918
J.-P.-Théodore Fontana	Conservative	1902	1907
A.-Edouard Odier	LPS/PLS	1902	1906
Jacques-S. Rutty	LPS/PLS	1902	1911
M.-Eugène Ritzchel	FDP/PRD	1906	1908
Thédore-E.-B. Turrettini	LPS/PLS	1906	1911
Alfred P. W. Georg	LPS/PLS	1907	1911
François Besson	FDP/PRD	1908	1910
Jules-F. Perréard	FDP/PRD	1908	1911
M.-Eugène Ritzchel	FDP/PRD	1910	1914
Victor-Marc Charbonnet	FDP/PRD	1911	1914
L.-Firmin Ody	Conservative	1911	1920
Marc-Ernest Peter	FDP/PRD	1911	1919
Jean-C. Sigg	SP/PS	1911	1919
J.-Louis Willemin	FDP/PRD	1911	1917
Albert-Edouard Maunoir	LPS/PLS	1914	1929
Horace Micheli	LPS/PLS	1914	1919
Frédéric-Jules De Rabours	LPS/PLS	1917	1925
John-Marc Rochaix	FDP/PRD	1917	1943
Edouard Ch. Steinmetz	LPS/PLS	1918	1919
Léon Nicole	SP/PS	1919	1941
Emile Nicolet	SP/PS	1919	1921
B.-Marius Stoessel	FDP/PRD	1919	1922
Jules-Edouard Gottret	Conservative	1920	1947
J.-Louis Willemin	FDP/PRD	1920	1922
Jacques Dicker	SP/PS	1922	1925
Ernest Joray	SP/PS	1922	1922
Adrien Lachenal	FDP/PRD	1922	1951
Horace Micheli	LPS/PLS	1922	1928
Charles Rosselet	SP/PS	1922	1945
Paul Logoz	UDE	1925	1930
Albert-Louis Naine	SP/PS	1925	1928
Frédéric-Jules De Rabours	LPS/PLS	1928	1928
Jacques Dicker	SP/PS	1928	1941
François-Jules Micheli	LPS/PLS	1928	1929
Gabriel Bonnet	LPS/PLS	1929	1931
Frédéric-Jules De Rabours	LPS/PLS	1929	1929
Edouard Ch. Steinmetz	LPS/PLS	1929	1935
David Revaclier	UDE	1931	1931
François Joseph Rossiaud	SP/PS	1931	1933
André Ehrler	SP/PS	1933	1933
François Joseph Rossiaud	SP/PS	1934	1935
Théodore Aubert	LPS/PLS	1935	1939
Albert-Edouard Picot	LPS/PLS	1935	1949
François Perréard	FDP/PRD	1939	1955
Georges-Paul Randon	FDP/PRD	1941	1942
William Rappard	LDU/LdI	1941	1943
Georges Haldenwang	LPS/PLS	1942	1943
Aymon de Senarclens	LPS/PLS	1943	1955
André Guinand	FDP/PRD	1943	1963
Antoine Pugin	Conservative	1943	1947
André Oltramare	SP/PS	1946	1947
Fernand Cottier	Conservative	1947	1959
Marius Maillard	SP/PS	1947	1947
Léon Nicole	PdA/PST	1947	1955
Jean Vincent	PdA/PST	1947	1980
Raymond Deonna	LPS/PLS	1949	1951
Georges Borel	SP/PS	1951	1967
Alfred Borel	FDP/PRD	1951	1963
Charles Primborgne	Conservative	1955	1975
François Revaclier	FDP/PRD	1955	1971
Olivier Reverdin	LPS/PLS	1955	1971
Raymond Bertholet	SP/PS	1963	1967
Raymond Deonna	LPS/PLS	1963	1972
Yves Maitre	CCS	1963	1966
Henri Schmitt	FDP/PRD	1963	1975
Jean Babel	CCS	1966	1967
André Chavanne	SP/PS	1967	1977
Roger Dafflon	PdA/PST	1967	1984
Alfred Gehrig	LDU/LdI	1967	1971
Jean Ziegler	SP/PS	1967	1983
Fernand Corbat	FDP/PRD	1971	1979
Guy Fontanet	CVP/PDC	1971	1978
François Peyrot	LPS/PLS	1971	1975
Nelly Wicky	PdA/PST	1971	1975
André Gautier	LPS/PLS	1972	1987
Monique Bauer-Lagier	LPS/PLS	1975	1979
Gilbert Duboule	FDP/PRD	1975	1983
Christian Grobet	SP/PS	1975	1982
Amélia Christinat	SP/PS	1978	1987
Robert Tochon	CVP/PDC	1978	1983
Gilbert Coutau	LPS/PLS	1979	1991
Gilles Petitpierre	FDP/PRD	1979	1991
Armand Magnin	PdA/PST	1981	1987
René Longet	SP/PS	1982	1991
Jacques-Simon Eggly	LPS/PLS	1983	1995
Jean-Philippe Maitre	CVP/PDC	1983	1995
Laurent Rebeaud	GPS/PES	1983	1994
Jean Revaclier	FDP/PRD	1983	1987
Mario Soldini	Vig./GE	1986	1987
Dominique Ducret	CVP/PDC	1987	1995
Jean-Michel Gros	LPS/PLS	1987	1995
Guy-Olivier Segond	FDP/PRD	1987	1990
Jean Spielmann	PdA/PST	1987	1995
Jean Ziegler	SP/PS	1987	1995
Jean Revaclier	FDP/PRD	1990	1991
Christiane Brunner	SP/PS	1991	1995
Jean-Nils de Dardel	SP/PS	1991	1995
Charles Poncet	LPS/PLS	1991	1995
Peter Tschopp	FDP/PRD	1991	1995
Fabienne Bugnon	GPS/PES	1994	1995
Jean-Nils de Dardel	SP/PS	1995	2003
John Dupraz	FDP/PRD	1995	2003
Jacques-Simon Eggly	LPS/PLS	1995	2007
Christian Grobet	0	1995	2003
Jean-Michel Gros	LPS/PLS	1995	1999
Jean-Philippe Maitre	CVP/PDC	1995	2005
Liliane Maury Pasquier	SP/PS	1995	2007
Maria Roth-Bernasconi	SP/PS	1995	1999
Jean Spielmann	PdA/PST	1995	2003
Peter Tschopp	FDP/PRD	1995	1999
Jean Ziegler	SP/PS	1995	1999
Madeleine Bernasconi	FDP/PRD	1999	2003
Patrice Mugny	GPS/PES	1999	2003
Barbara Polla	LPS/PLS	1999	2003
Jean-Claude Vaudroz	CVP/PDC	1999	2003
Martine Brunschwig Graf	LPS/PLS	2003	2011
John Dupraz	FDP/PRD	2003	2007
Ueli Leuenberger	GPS/PES	2003	2015
Jacques Pagan	SVP/UDC	2003	2007
André Reymond	SVP/UDC	2003	2007
Maria Roth-Bernasconi	SP/PS	2003	2015
Carlo Sommaruga	SP/PS	2003	2023
Pierre Vanek	AdG	2003	2007
Luc Barthassat	CVP/PDC	2005	2013
Hugues Hiltpold	FDP/PRD	2007	2023
Antonio Hodgers	GPS/PES	2007	2013
Christian Lüscher	LPS/PLS	2007	2023
Yves Nidegger	SVP/UDC	2007	2023
André Reymond	SVP/UDC	2007	2011
Jean-Charles Rielle	SP/PS	2007	2011
Céline Amaudruz	SVP/UDC	2011	Incumbent
Mauro Poggia	MCR	2011	2013
Manuel Tornare	SP/PS	2011	2023
Guillaume Barazzone	CVP/PDC	2013	2023
Roger Golay	MCR	2013	2023
Anne Mahrer	GPS/PES	2013	2015
Laurence Fehlmann Rielle	SP/PS	2015	2023
Benoît Genecand	FDP/PLR	2015	2023
Lisa Mazzone	GPS/PES	2015	2023
Delphine Klopfenstein Broggini	GPS/PES	2019	Incumbent
Nicolas Walder	GPS/PES	2019	Incumbent
Vincent Maitre	The Centre	2019	Incumbent
Christian Dandrès	SP/PS	2019	Incumbent
Laurence Fehlmann Rielle	SP/PS	2019	Incumbent
Simone De Montmollin	FDP/PLR	2019	Incumbent
Charles Poncet	SVP/UDC	2023	Incumbent
Cyril Aellen	FDP/PLR	2023	Incumbent
Estelle Revaz	SP/PS	2023	Incumbent
Mauro Poggia	MCR	2023	Incumbent
Roger Golay	MCR	2023	Incumbent
