= Emma Kammacher =

Swiss human rights lawyer, activist and politician

- Born: 14 May 1904; Meyrin, Geneva, Switzerland
- Died: 15 April 1981 (aged 76); Le Grand-Saconnex, Geneva, Switzerland
- Education: Collège Calvin
- Occupations: Attorney; Politician; Women's right activist
- Political party: SP
- Spouse: (none)
- Parent(s): Christian Kammacher; Catherine Émilie Desplands

Emma Kammacher (14 May 1904 – 15 April 1981) was a Swiss human rights lawyer, activist and politician. She was a member of the Social Democratic Party of Switzerland and served as a member of the Grand Council of Geneva. In 1965 she became the first woman to serve as president of a Swiss cantonal council.

== Life ==
=== Provenance and early years ===
Emma Kammacher was the daughter of Christian Kammacher who came from a Bernese farming family, and of Catherine Émilie Desplands, originally from Rougemont at the eastern end of the adjacent (and francophone) canton of Vaud. Kammacher was born in Meyrin, just outside Geneva, on the south side of the city. She was educated at the Collège Calvin in Geneva and she then went on to study law at Bern. she obtained her license to practice law in 1929. She then moved back to Geneva, where she passed her bar examination in 1932. She was now able to work on behalf of clients. The focus of her work during these early years was on defending those who had fallen victim to the economic crash and found themselves without basic rights, resolving to use her legal qualifications and experience to work for changes in the law and public attitudes.

=== Women's rights ===
In 1932 Kammacher became de facto secretary of the Association genevoise pour le suffrage féminin, working alongside Emilie Gourd to campaign for women's voting rights on a cantonal level. Nationally she was a member - and according to one source secretary - of the cantonal association's national counterpart, known at that time as the Association suisse pour le suffrage féminin (ASSF), which pursued the same objectives nationally. Emilie Gourd died in December 1946 and Kammacher took on the presidency of the Geneva association in 1947, serving in that position till 1955. Particularly strong support and encouragement in the struggle for women's rights in the legal profession and more broadly came from Nelly Schreiber-Favre (1872- 1972), who back at the start of the twentieth century had become the first woman lawyer to gain admittance to the Geneva Bar association. Kammacher was in addition a member of the committee behind the monthly publication "Le mouvement féministe" (renamed during 1960 "Femmes suisses").

At her investiture address as she took over the presidency of the "Grand Conseil de Genève" from Yves Maître, Kammacher delivered her reply to anyone who still wondered if the introduction of women to participation in mainstream [canton-level] politics might be reversed:

- "Look. The proof that we are in the right is that we have never turned back. Our rights are agreed. There is no longer anyone who dares to pretend that one day we would have to go back."
- "Voyez-vous, la preuve que nous sommes dans le vrai, c’est que nous n’avons encore jamais reculé et que, nos droits accordés, il ne se trouve plus personne pour oser prétendre qu’il faudra un jour revenir en arrière."
  Emma Kammacher, 1965

=== 1961: Grand Council of Geneva membership ===
At that time (as now) Geneva was among the more politically progressive of the (then) 25 cantons, and on 6 March 1960 it became just the third canton to legislate for the introduction of women's suffrage in cantonal elections. Emma Kammacher launched herself into the world of cantonal politics. She stood as a candidate for the "Parti socialiste suisse" (loosely but conventionally translated: "Social Democratic Party" / SP), which was the first party actually to include women on its candidates list. In 1961 Emma Kammacher was one of nine women elected to of the "Grand Conseil de Genève" (cantonal legislature). In 1965 she was elected president of the legislature, becoming the first woman to achieve this distinction in any of the cantonal parliaments.

=== 1965: Grand Council of Geneva president with a women's rights agenda ===
Her position on the cantonal legislature provided Kammacher with an invaluable platform for her advocacy of pressing feminist causes. The right to vote in national elections, already taken for granted in surrounding western European democracies, was at the top of the list. On 22 February 1965 Geneva's newly elected Grand Council president, both in her own name and in the names of 564 women co-signatories from Geneva, submitted an appeal to the "Conseil fédéral" (Federal Council - Switzerland's seven member collective executive head of state ) against the refusal of the "Conseil d'état cantonal" (Geneva's Council of State) to permit those Genevois citizens who were women to vote in national elections to the "Assemblée fédérale" (Swiss national parliament)). Kammacher's case reflected her legal experience. The term "Swiss citizen" used in the Swiss Federal Constitution applied equally to men and to women. There was no indication, implicit or express, that the term should be restricted to just one sex. That meant that voting rights and other constitutional eligibilities applied equally to Swiss citizens who were female. Kammacher also argued that the voting rights and eligibilities accorded by the constitution nationally were based on the same rights as those accorded in the canton of a citizen's domicile. Given that, in Geneva, since 6 March 1960, women had no longer been excluded from exercising their civic rights in cantonal elections, there was no reason for the cantonal authorities to refuse those same civic rights in respect of federal (national) elections.

The reaction of the "Conseil fédéral" to the appeal from Geneva was not wholly surprising. Female voting rights and eligibilities at a federal (national) level could be granted only on the basis of a national majority vote [of - at that time - participating male voters], and with backing from the majority of the 25 cantons. That meant a rejection of the appeal organised by Kammacher, but as matters turned out she had nevertheless advanced the cause of votes for women nationally by pushing it up the national agenda. In the end, following a further six years of campaigning, the necessary referendum was held on 7 February 1971. 944,991 [men] voted. More than 65% voted in favour of giving women the vote in national elections, and there was a majority in favour of the move in more than half of the cantons. Emma Kammacher had retired from active politics, but the battle in which she had for so long engaged was finally won.

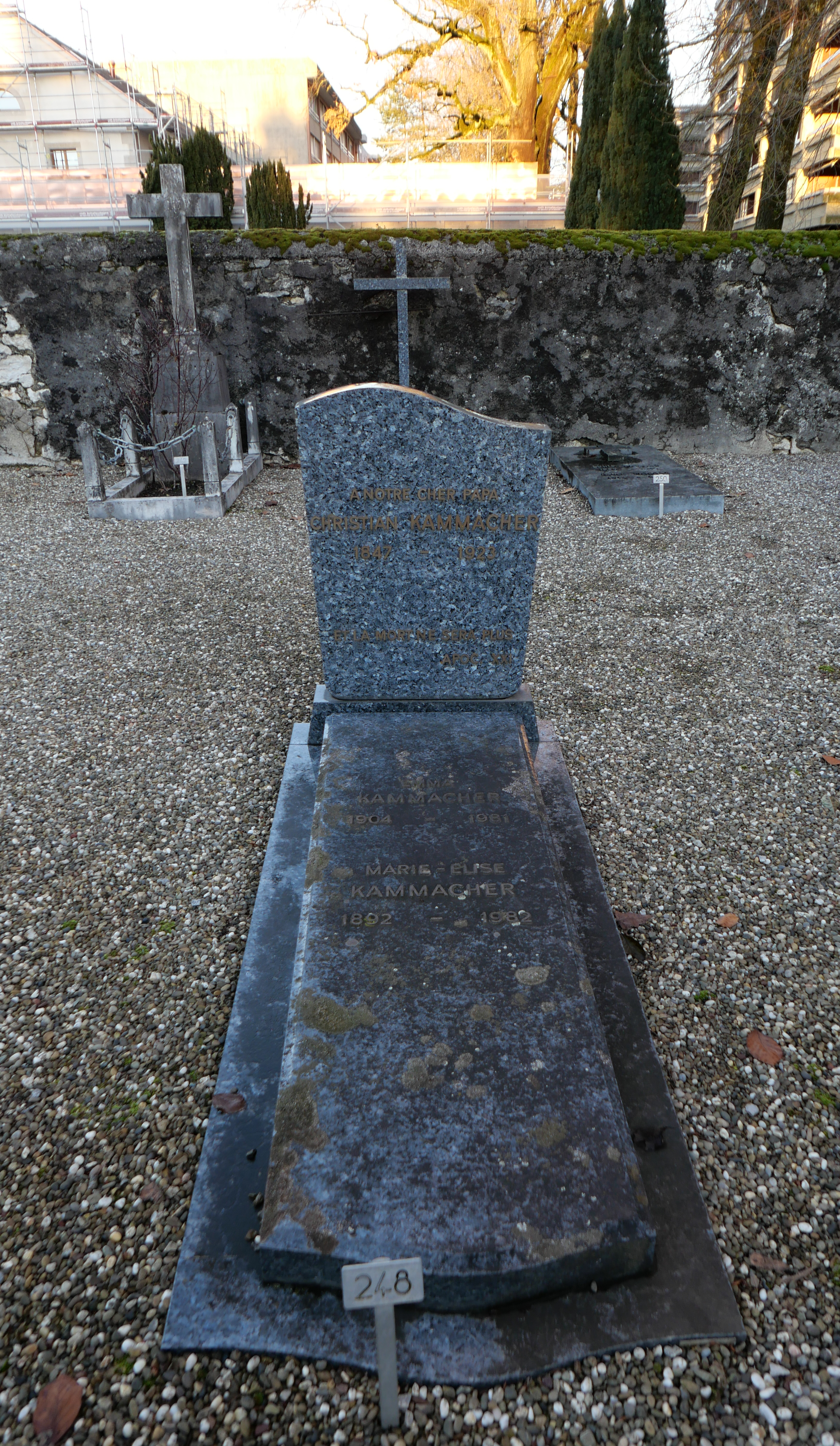
Kammacher's tomb

Kammacher also used her presidency to promote sex equality in canton-level legislation. She pressed for reform of the legal framework for marriage in ways which would eliminate gender bias and create the possibility of financial independence for married women. She campaigned against the different prices paid for sickness insurance by women, and against the absurdity whereby (female) employees were forced to accept unpaid "maternity leave", rather than being able to benefit from a system of "maternity insurance". Through example and exhortation, Emma Kammacher encouraged [female] citizens to participate in public debates on the issues which concerned them.

Although commentators have concentrated on her role in advancing the cause of votes for women, Emma Kammacher's contributions as a member and then as president of the cantonal legislature covered a far wider range of issues. Having herself grown up in a family of very modest means, she was always quick to identify with those adversely impacted, whether among the rural population or in the cities, by the social problems that accompanied Switzerland's economic resurgence during, most strikingly, the 1960s. She helped many people with housing problems or difficulties accessing appropriate educational opportunities for their children because they were socially disadvantaged - on low wages or ethnically different from mainstream populations in a village or municipality.

=== Retirement and death ===
Ten years after the referendum that ushered in universal adult suffrage on the national level Emma Kammacher died in Le Grand-Saconnex at the age of 76. She had continued to practice law until a few months before her death. Kammacher is buried in a family grave at the cemetery of Meyrin-Village.

== Celebration ==
- Rue Emma-Kammacher in her home town of Meyrin was named in her honour.
- A social housing foundation, named in her honour, was managing 1,785 apartments in March 2020.
