= Amélia Christinat =

Swiss politician

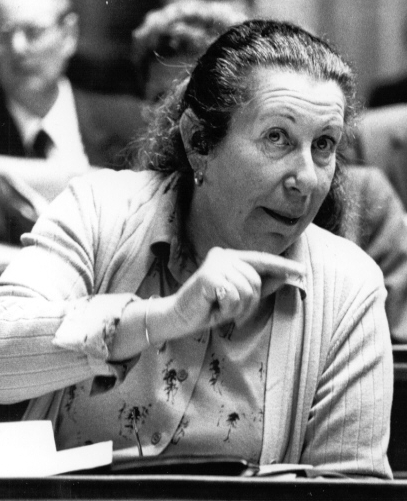
- Amélia Christinat in 1986.

Member of the National Council of Switzerland
- In office 16 January 1978 – 29 November 1987

Member of the Grand Council of Geneva
- In office November 1969 – March 1980

Personal details
- Born: 6 February 1926 Corticiasca, Ticino
- Died: 7 September 2016 (aged 90) Geneva
- Party: Social Democratic Party of Switzerland
- Occupation: Worker; Women's rights activist

Amélia Christinat (6 February 1926 at Corticiasca, Ticino – 7 September 2016 in Geneva) was a Swiss politician and women's rights activist. She sat in the National Council from 1978 to 1987 as the first female National Councillor from the canton of Geneva.

== Life ==
Amélia Christinat was born in 1926 at Corticiasca, Ticino in southeastern Switzerland, into a poor family. She was the daughter of boilermaker Eugenio Petrall and of mountain farmer Maria-Maddalena Minuzzi. She was trained as a dressmaker at the vocational school of Lugano. She subsequently worked at Tavaro SA and later as a civil servant at the post cheque office.

In October 1949, she married Emile Christinat, a post administrator who was 17 years older than her. Their daughter Nadia was born in 1955. Emile died in 1994.

Amélia Christinat died from a stroke on 7 September 2016 in Geneva.

== Political career ==
Amélia first campaigned as a trade unionist and as a suffragist. After women's suffrage was introduced in the canton of Geneva in March 1960, Christinat joined the Social Democratic Party of Geneva. She took part to the establishment of the Fédération romande des consommatrices (French-Swiss Consumers' Federation) alongside former syndic of Lausanne Yvette Jaggi to promote the importance of the social and economic role of housewives.

In 1978, she became the first female National Councillor from Geneva, representing the Social Democratic Party. She campaigned for maternity insurance and for a better representation of women in the Federal Assembly. She was nicknamed "la pasionaria" because of her passion.

== See also ==
- List of members of the Federal Assembly from the Canton of Geneva
- Women's suffrage in Switzerland
