= Jacqueline Berenstein-Wavre =

Swiss politician (1921–2021)

- Born: Jacqueline Wavre; 26 December 1921; Merkwiller-Pechelbronn, France
- Died: 22 January 2021 (aged 99)
- Occupation: Politician
- Political party: PS

Jacqueline Berenstein-Wavre (26 December 1921 – 22 January 2021) was a Swiss politician who spent her political career in Geneva. She fought for women's rights in the workplace.

== Biography ==
Jacqueline was the youngest of four children born to Robert Wavre and Esther (née de Montmoulin) in Merkwiller-Pechelbronn, Alsace. She spent much of her childhood in the shadow of World War II, living both in Neuchâtel and Le Chambon-sur-Lignon. She studied at the University of Geneva and became an apprentice saleswoman before working in a factory manufacturing Elna brand sewing machines. She then worked as a schoolteacher in various locations.

Berenstein-Wavre began to devote herself to advancing the role of women. She joined the Social Democratic Party of Switzerland in 1950 and campaigned for women's suffrage, failing several times before Genevan women finally gained the right to vote in 1960, and at a national level in 1971. Looking back at this time, she testified that "We were called suffragettes. I paraded on Sunday in front of the Servette polling station with a sticking plaster over my mouth!".

She was the first woman to be elected to the Municipal Council of Geneva in April 1963, and served as Chair of the council from 1968 to 1973. She was elected to the Grand Council of Geneva, where she served from 1973 to 1989. In 1970, she married professor and fellow socialist Alexandre Berenstein, who worked at the University of Geneva and as a judge at the Federal Supreme Court of Switzerland. There, he worked to include gender equality into the Swiss Federal Constitution, adopted in June 1981.

On a federal level, Berenstein-Wavre chaired the Alliance of Swiss Feminine Societies from 1975 to 1980 and was a member of the Federal Commission for Women's Issues. Another of her political fights was to bring a Federal Certificate of Capacity for managers in consumer economics. From 1957 to 2012, she took part in changes made by the Swiss feminist newspaper L'Émilie. In 1977, she created a special agenda for bilingual French-German Swiss women. In 1984, she founded and led the Fondation Émilie Gourd, which sought to develop and publish information on women's issues in Romandy.

From 1996 to 2006, she co-chaired the Association Suisses et Internationaux de Genève, which campaigned for Swiss entry into the United Nations. Until her death, she remained an active member of Femmes pour la paix in Geneva. She was Honorary President of the Geneva International Peace Research Institut, as well as President of the Fondation Collège du Travail from 1984 to 1998.

Jacqueline Berenstein-Wavre died on 22 January 2021 at the age of 99.

== Publications ==
- Ménagère aujourd'hui, éd. Femmes suisses, 1974. Enquête réalisée auprès de 1300 ménagères romandes sur leur budget temps-ménage with Fabienne Bouvier and Martine Ouaknine-Berset
- La Maison des compétences : ce qu'on apprend en gérant une maison familiale , Slatkine, 2005
- Le Bâton dans la fourmilière : une vie pour plus d'égalité, entretiens avec Fabienne Bouvier, Editions Metropolis, Geneva, 2005 (ISBN 2883401578)
- Preface by Jacqueline Berenstein-Wavre to the book by Martine Chaponnière, Silvia Ricci Lempen, Tu vois le genre? Débats féministes contemporains, Éditions d'en bas, 2012, ISBN 9782829004391

== Honors ==
- Prix « Femme exilée, femme engagée » of the City of Geneva (2012)
