= Club Airways International =

Swiss airline

- Founded: 2002
- Commenced operations: 2003
- Operating bases: Geneva Cointrin International Airport
- Parent company: Club 328
- Headquarters: Meyrin, Switzerland

Club Airways International is an airline based in Meyrin, Switzerland, near Geneva. It operates business jets for its members. Its main base is Geneva Cointrin International Airport.

== History ==
The airline was established in December 2002 and started operations in February 2003. It is a subsidiary of United Kingdom-based Club 328.

== Fleet ==
The Club Airways International fleet includes the following aircraft (at January 2005):

- Cessna Citation Bravo
- Falcon 20
