= Janome =

Japanese manufacturer of sewing machines

Janome Corporation
- Native name: 株式会社ジャノメ
- Company type: Public KK
- Traded as: TYO: 6445
- Industry: Machinery
- Founded: Tokyo, Japan (October 16, 1921; 104 years ago)
- Founder: Yosaku Ose
- Headquarters: Hachioji, Japan
- Key people: Hachiro Makabe (President)
- Products: Sewing machines; Electro-presses; Imprinters; Desktop robots; SCARA robots; Cartesian robots
- Revenue: ▲JPY 46.01 billion (FY 2014) (US$ 383.4 million) (FY 2014)
- Net income: ▲JPY 1.86 billion (FY 2014) (US$ 15.5 million) (FY 2014)
- Number of employees: 3,528 (as of June 22, 2015)
- Subsidiaries: Elna
- Website: www.janome.com

Janome Corporation (株式会社ジャノメ, Kabushiki-gaisha Janome) is a Japanese company that produces sewing machines, with manufacturing plants in Japan, Taiwan and Thailand.

The company name until September 30, 2021, was Janome Sewing Machine Co., Ltd. (蛇の目ミシン工業株式会社, Janome Mishin Kōgyō Kabushiki-gaisha).

== History ==
=== Pine Sewing Machine Company ===
The Pine Sewing Machine factory was founded on 16 October 1921. In 1935, the Janome trademark was established, and the company was renamed to Janome Sewing Machine Co., Ltd. in 1954. In the USA, its subsidiary is Janome America located in Mahwah, New Jersey; it also owns the Swiss brand Elna. The company manufactures all of its machines in the same factories.

=== New Home Sewing Machine Company ===
Around 1862, William Barker and Andrew J. Clark began producing the "Pride of the West" sewing machine, later calling it the "New England Single Thread Hand Sewing Machine" after moving the plant to Orange, Massachusetts, in 1867. Over the next few years, the New England machine and the "Home Shuttle" were their two most significant products. In 1882, the company reformed under the name New Home (a combination of the labels New England and Home Shuttle). The company ran into financial difficulties in the 1920s and was taken over by The Free Sewing Machine Company in 1930, after which the latter temporarily ran the business for two years. In 1960, New Home and the "New Home" brand were purchased by the Janome company.

=== Later history ===
Janome developed its range further by establishing a research laboratory in Tokyo in 1964. In 1971, they released the first sewing machine with both programmable and computerised functions, for the industrial market.

Janome was also the first to develop a computerized machine for home use (the Memory 7, in 1979), the first to offer professional style embroidery for the home market (the Memory Craft 8000, in 1990) and the first to offer a long-arm quilting machine for home use (the Memory Craft 6500P, in 2003).

On October 1, 2021, the company name was changed to "JANOME Corporation".

== Name ==
The name "Janome" (蛇の目) literally means "snake's eye." It was taken from the appearance of the bobbin design at the time of brand establishment in 1935, when the newer, round bobbin system was starting to replace the traditional long shuttle. As the new round bobbin looked like a snake's eye, Janome was chosen as the company's name.

Janome is also the name of the traditional Japanese bull's-eye umbrella design.

== Retail sales network ==
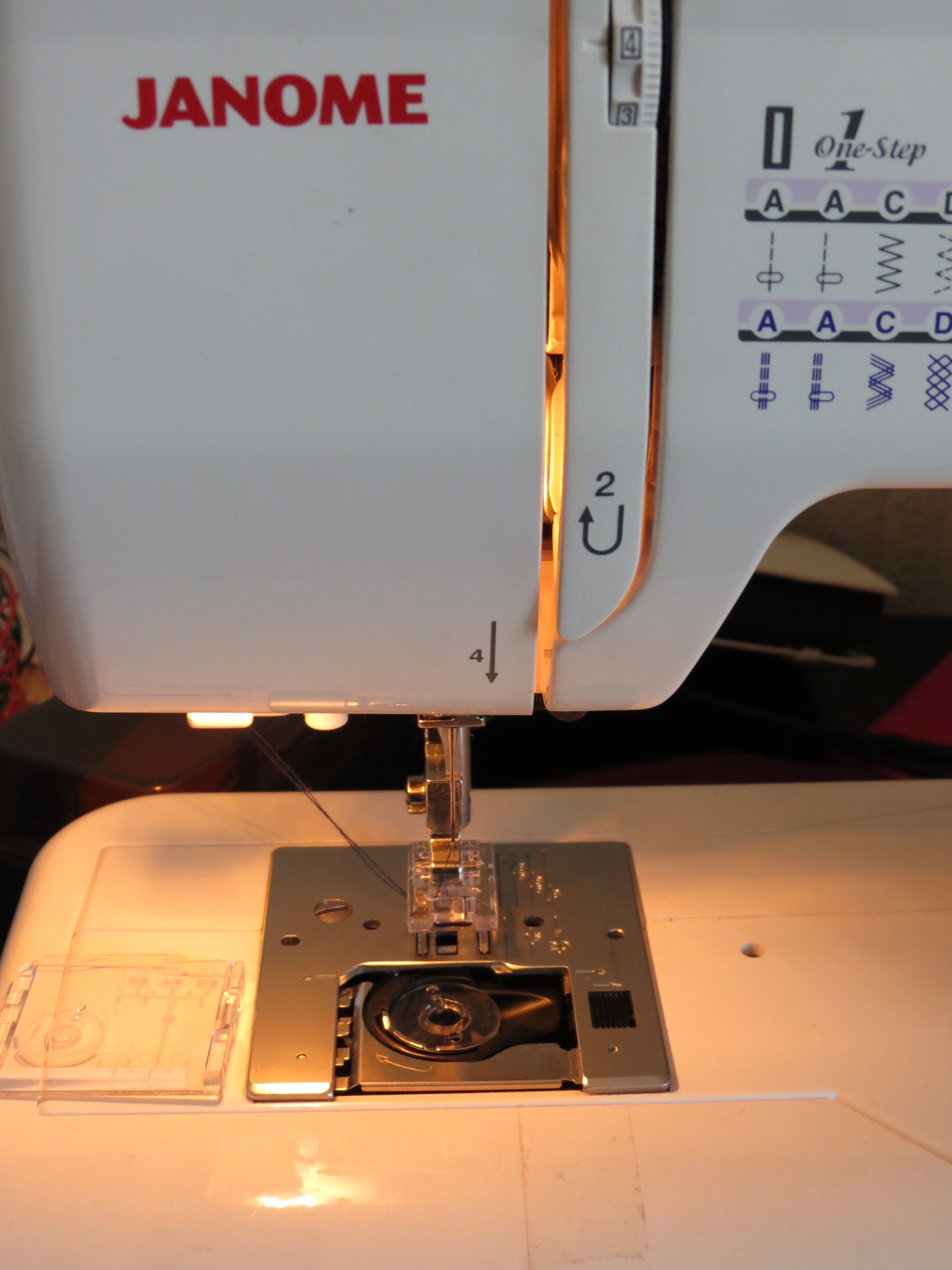
Janome sewing machine

Janome is a globally recognized brand and has expanded into over 100 countries around the world. Distribution is handled through a retail sales channel, the retailers being listed on their various global websites.

== See also ==
- List of sewing machine brands
