= Amédée-Pierre-Jules Pictet de Sergy =

Swiss politician and historian (1795–1888)

- Born: 29 June 1795; Vernier
- Died: 16 January 1888 (aged 92); Geneva, Switzerland
- Other name: Jules Pictet
- Occupations: Politician, historian
- Spouses: Adélaïde de Candolle (m. 1825) Anne Pictet (m. 1833)
- Children: Gustave Pictet; Ernest Pictet
- Relatives: Charles Pictet de Rochemont (father-in-law)

Amédée-Pierre-Jules Pictet de Sergy (29 June 1795 – 16 January 1888), known as Jules Pictet, was a Swiss politician and historian from Geneva. He sat in the Representative Council of Geneva, was a deputy to the Federal Diet in 1834 and a member of the Council of State from 1836 to 1839. After the radical revolution of 1841 ended his political career, he worked mainly as a political writer and historian.

== Biography ==
Jules Pictet was born in Vernier into the Pictet family. He was the son of Jean-Marc-Jules Pictet, a judge, and Octavie Diodati. In 1825 he married Adélaïde de Candolle, daughter of Jacob-Michel-François de Candolle, the founder of the present-day Pictet bank, and niece of Augustin Pyramus de Candolle. In 1833 he married Anne Pictet, daughter of Charles Pictet de Rochemont. He was the father of Gustave Pictet and Ernest Pictet.

Pictet studied law in Geneva, Heidelberg and Jena. He sat in the Representative Council (Conseil représentatif) of Geneva from 1825 to 1835 and in 1841–1842, was a deputy to the Federal Diet in 1834, and was a member of the Council of State of Geneva from 1836 to 1839. The radical revolution of 1841 ended his political career. From then on he worked mainly as a political writer (publiciste) and historian. He wrote several autobiographical manuscripts and numerous literary, historical and polemical works. He was a member of both the Geneva Society for Public Utility (Société genevoise d'utilité publique) and the Swiss Society for the Common Good.

== Bibliography ==
- J.-D. Candaux, Histoire de la famille Pictet, 1474–1974, 2, 1974, 417–430
- S. and S. Stelling-Michaud (eds.), Le Livre du Recteur de l'Académie de Genève (1559–1878), 5, 180

=== Archives ===
- Foundation of the Pictet Family Archives (Fondation des Archives de la famille Pictet), Geneva
- Partial papers in the State Archives of Geneva (Archives d'État de Genève) and the Library of Geneva (Bibliothèque de Genève)
