= Emilie Gourd =

Swiss feminist and journalist

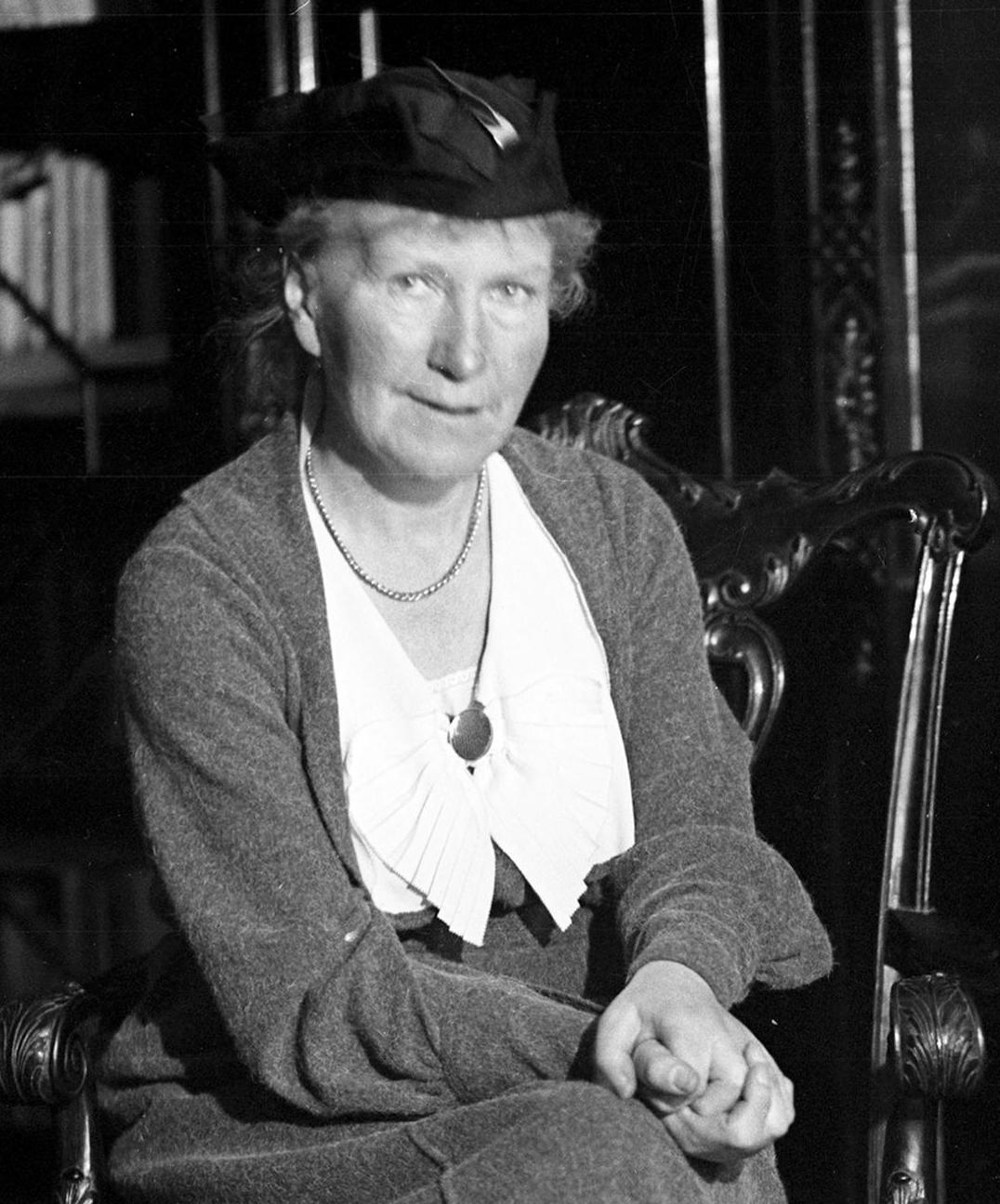
Emilie Gourd

Emilie Gourd (1879–1946) was a Swiss feminist and journalist. She played a leading part within the Swiss women's suffrage movement. She was the president of one of the two leading Swiss suffrage unions, the Swiss Women's Association, during 1914–1928.

== Life and work ==
Gourd is credited as being one of the most prominent figures in the 20th-century Swiss feminist movement. She first became involved in the movement in her mid-30s, but thereafter dedicated her life to the cause. She was particularly active in Geneva, where she was born, but also campaigned nationally for women's rights in Switzerland. The particular causes she campaigned for included women's education, equal pay, maternity benefits, disability benefits, and women's employment opportunities.

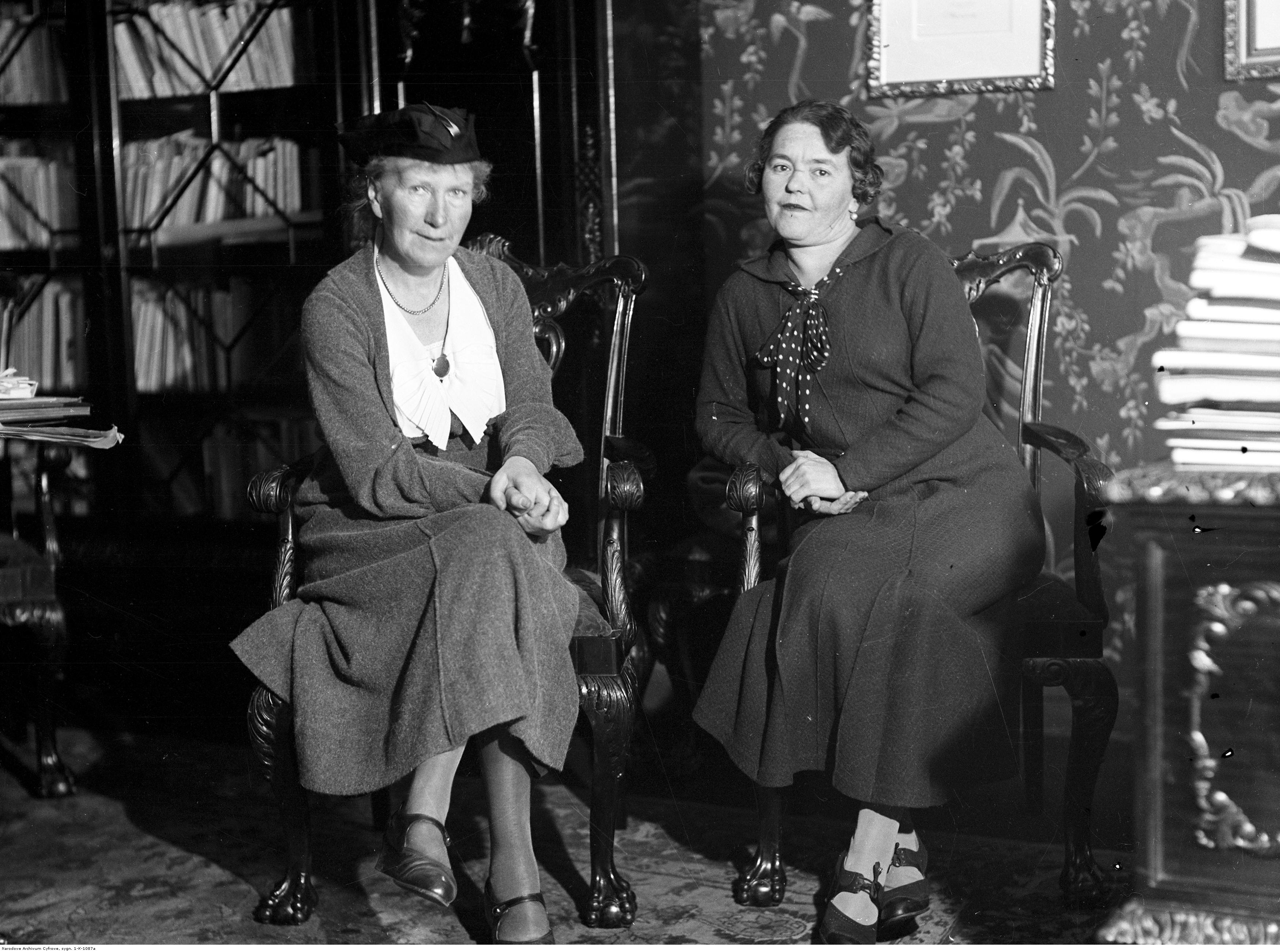
Emilie Gourd during her visit at the IKC ("Ilustrowany Kurier Codzienny") newspaper headquarters in Kraków, Poland. Emilie Gourd (on the left) and the IKC editor Zofia Lewakowska (on the right); 1935.

In 1912, Gourd founded Le mouvement féministe (English: The Feminist Movement), a newspaper that promoted women's suffrage, education and legal rights. She remained the chief editor of the newspaper until her death. In 2001 the newspaper took the name L'emiliE as a tribute to Emilie Gourd. Facing financial difficulties it abandoned paper publishing and became an online platform in 2009. This makes it the oldest still-running feminist publication in Europe. Gourd was the president of numerous feminist organisations and clubs, including the Schweizerischer Verband für Frauenstimmrecht (English: Swiss Women's Association), where she served as president and fought for women's right to vote in Switzerland from 1914 until 1928. In 1923, she was elected secretary of the International Alliance of Women. She published a biography of American suffragist Susan B. Anthony and edited a yearbook of Swiss women.

Gourd died in 1946, fourteen years before women in the canton of Geneva received the right to vote.

The feminist newspaper l'émiliE now abandoned paper publishing in and remains in the form of a website. Since 2012, the Emilie Gourd foundation has created an online platform Actuelles.ch acting as a feminist content curation proposing news and articles from other medias in Switzerland.

== Emilie Gourd Foundation ==
Jacqueline Berenstein-Wavre founded the Emilie Gourd Foundation in 1984 with the aim of continuing Gourd's legacy and promoting ongoing feminist debate in Switzerland.

Martine Chaponnière is the president of the foundation since 2013, and Sabine Esthier Thevenoz is the vice-president
