= Elna (Swiss company) =

Swiss sewing machine manufacturer

Elna International Corp. SA
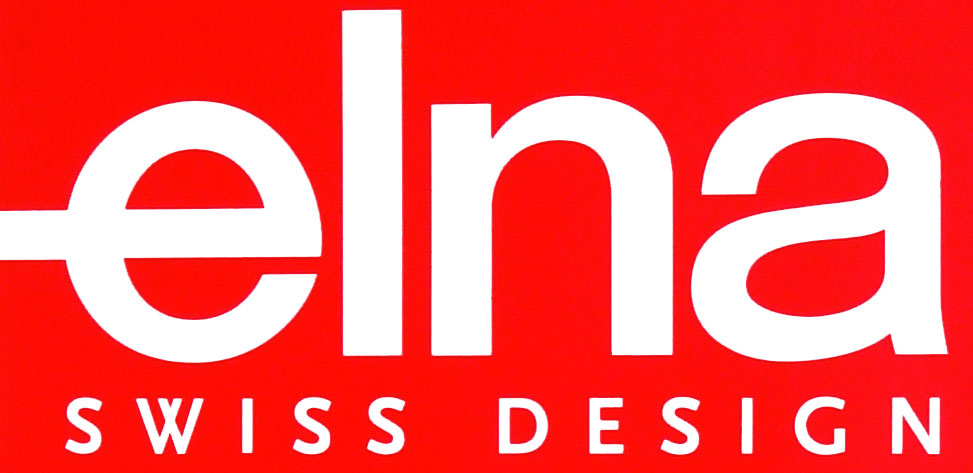
- Company type: Société anonyme
- Industry: Sewing and textile machines
- Founded: 1934; 92 years ago
- Founder: André Varaud, Dr. Ramon Casas Robert
- Headquarters: Meyrin, canton of Geneva, Switzerland
- Area served: Worldwide
- Parent: Janome
- Website: www.elna.com

Elna is a Swiss brand and former manufacturer of textile machines, including fabric presses and sewing, overlock and coverstitch machines. Elna sewing machines are included in the collections of the Museum of Design, Zürich, Tekniska museet, the Philadelphia Museum of Art, and the Museum of Modern Art.

== History ==
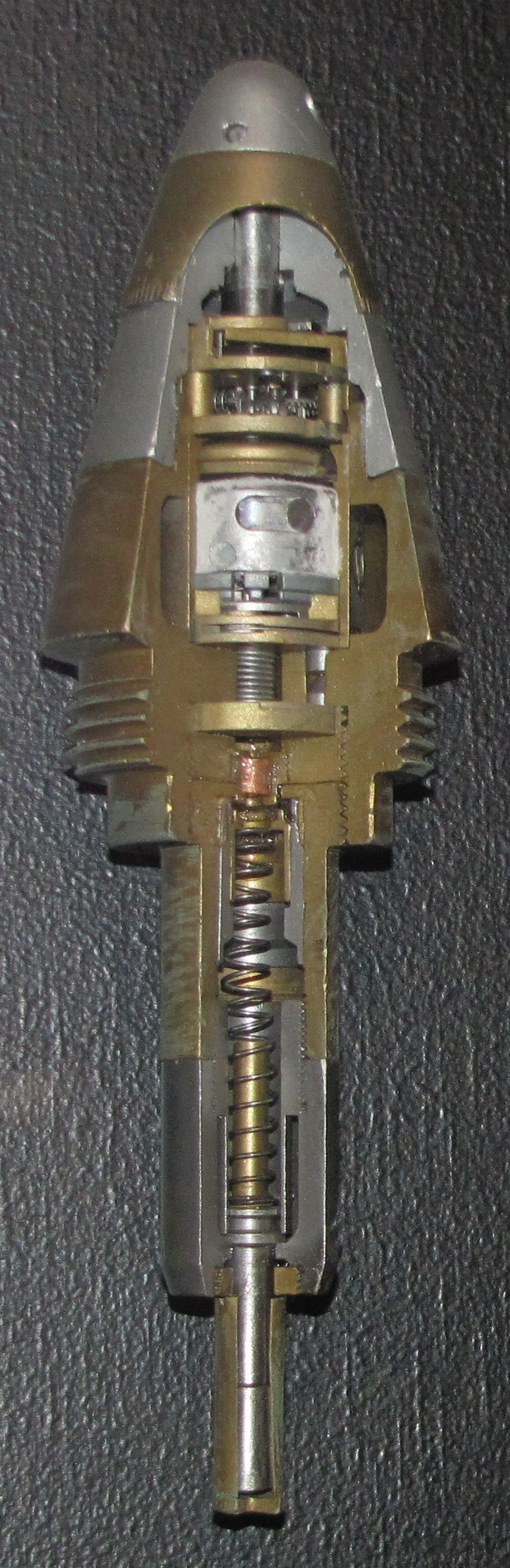
A Tavaro-made artillery fuze, Hämeenlinna Military Museum, Finland

The firm began as Ateliers Mécaniques de Précision Tavaro SA, founded as an export division of the Tavannes Watch Company (today part of Sandoz). The company was known for high-quality clockwork artillery fuzes, which saw use most notably in the German 88mm anti-aircraft gun. Tavaro was once responsible for a full 11% of Swiss military sales to Nazi Germany.

When the Swiss federal government restricted, then banned, exports of war materiel, Tavaro shifted to peaceful industry. At first, the factory exported watch parts & movements to the United Kingdom, in violation of wartime trade restrictions, for which the firm was recognized by the British government.

=== The "Grasshopper" ===
Tavaro's first sewing machine had no official name, just a model number (500890); but it was consistently referred to in sales literature simply as Elna (without a definite article). The creation of Dr. Ramon Casas Robert, (Note: According to Spanish naming customs, the first or paternal family name is Casas and the second or maternal family name is Robert.) a Spanish engineer, a working prototype was reportedly complete as early as 1934, but development was interrupted by the Spanish Civil War, and Casas was forced to emigrate to Switzerland. Living in a Geneva hotel room, lacking capital or equipment, Casas sold his patents to Tavaro through a holding company, and the first Elnas left the factory in 1940. With most of Europe's manufacturing economy still devastated, Elna's market position was very favorable as post-war demand for sewing machines rose. Within a year, Elna International Corp. SA had been entered into the cantonal company register, though export did not begin in earnest until after the end of the war.

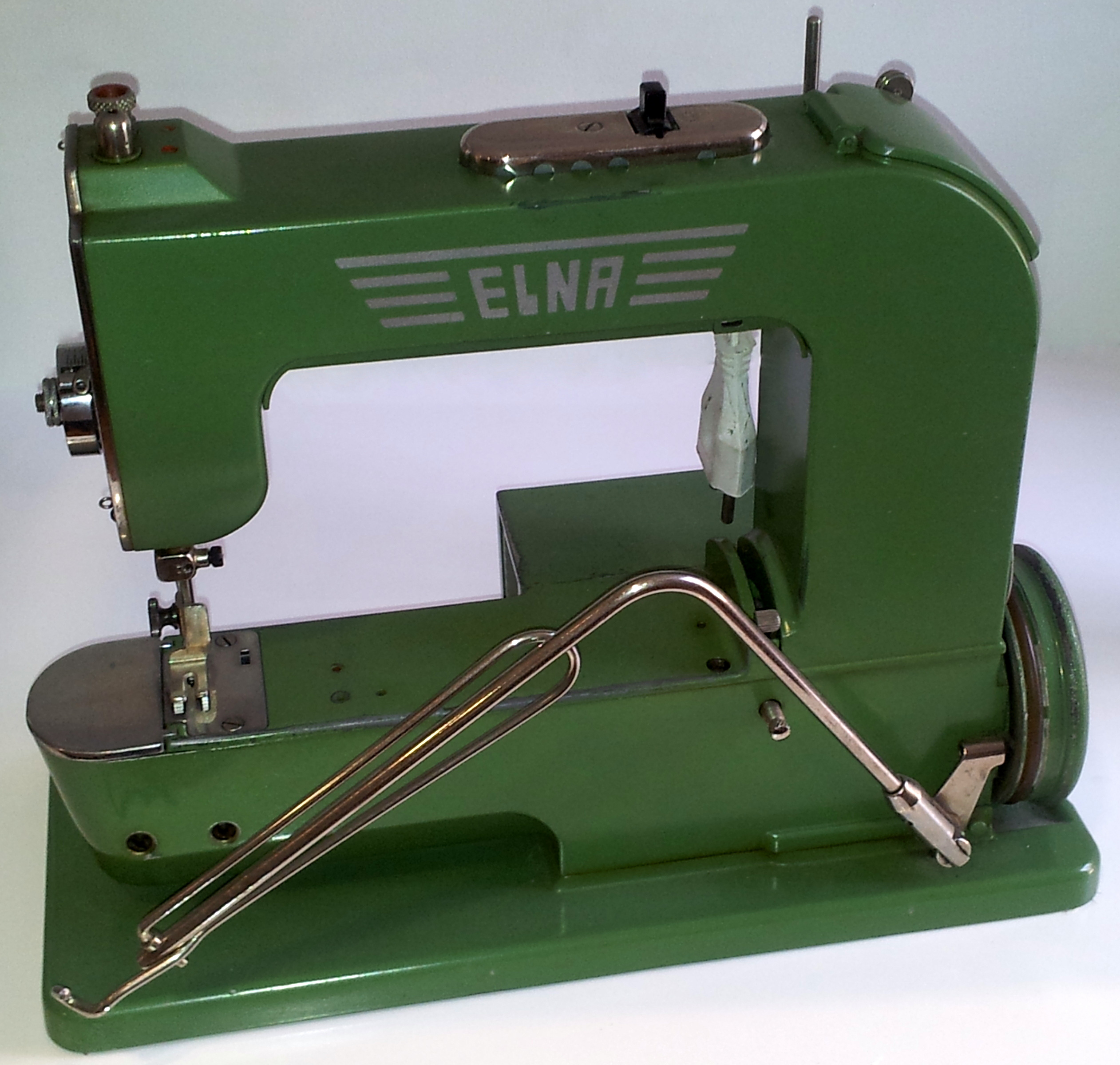
The first Elna, removed from its metal case

Elna was a radical departure from its competitors, and its success permanently changed the home sewing machine market, introducing features now considered standard. Its most significant innovation is its free arm, a feature previously found only on industrial sewing machines. A free arm houses the machine's feeder and bobbin driver in a tubular arm-shaped bed, enabling material to be wrapped around the mechanism during sewing rather than simply resting on top of it. A free arm greatly simplifies sewing tasks like darning and hemming on delicate fabrics and difficult-to-reach seams—uses for which Elna was heavily advertised. Elna's drop-in rotary hook runs with little movement or noise, unlike oscillating shuttle machines popular at the time, which require a bobbin case and vibrate at high speeds due to air resistance.

Casas also recognized that "when a woman finishes sewing she wants to get the machine out of the way," so Elna was designed to be portable and easily stored. It weighed less than 7 kg thanks largely to a body made from molded aluminium instead of heavy cast iron. Though sewing machines had been traditionally japanned in black with gold decals, Elna was finished in a distinctive matte green, giving rise to the machine's popular nickname, the Grasshopper. Its carrying case even doubles as an extension table, another widely imitated feature that would eventually become an Elna trademark.

Elna sold for US$179 when introduced in the US. (Note: Equivalent to more than $1,900 in 2019 when adjusted for inflation via CPI.) It was phased out beginning in 1952 with the release of the Supermatic. Estimates for total production range from 65,000 to half a million.

=== Elna Supermatic ===
Dr. Casas's improved Elna, named the Supermatic, was the world's first home sewing machine with automated reverse feed. Its cam reader, dubbed the Elnagraph, operated with two-sided cams interchangeable with a forked lock nut.

=== Later models ===
- SP (Special Edition)
- TSP (Top Special Edition)
- Lotus - Portable model
- Stella - Electronic portable model
- Air Electronic - another revolution in the industry, instead of a standard pedal, its control was a cushion powered by air from an internal compressor, which was silent and never overheated
- Carina - introduced a button-operated bobbin threader and an accessories' case that slid under the free arm.
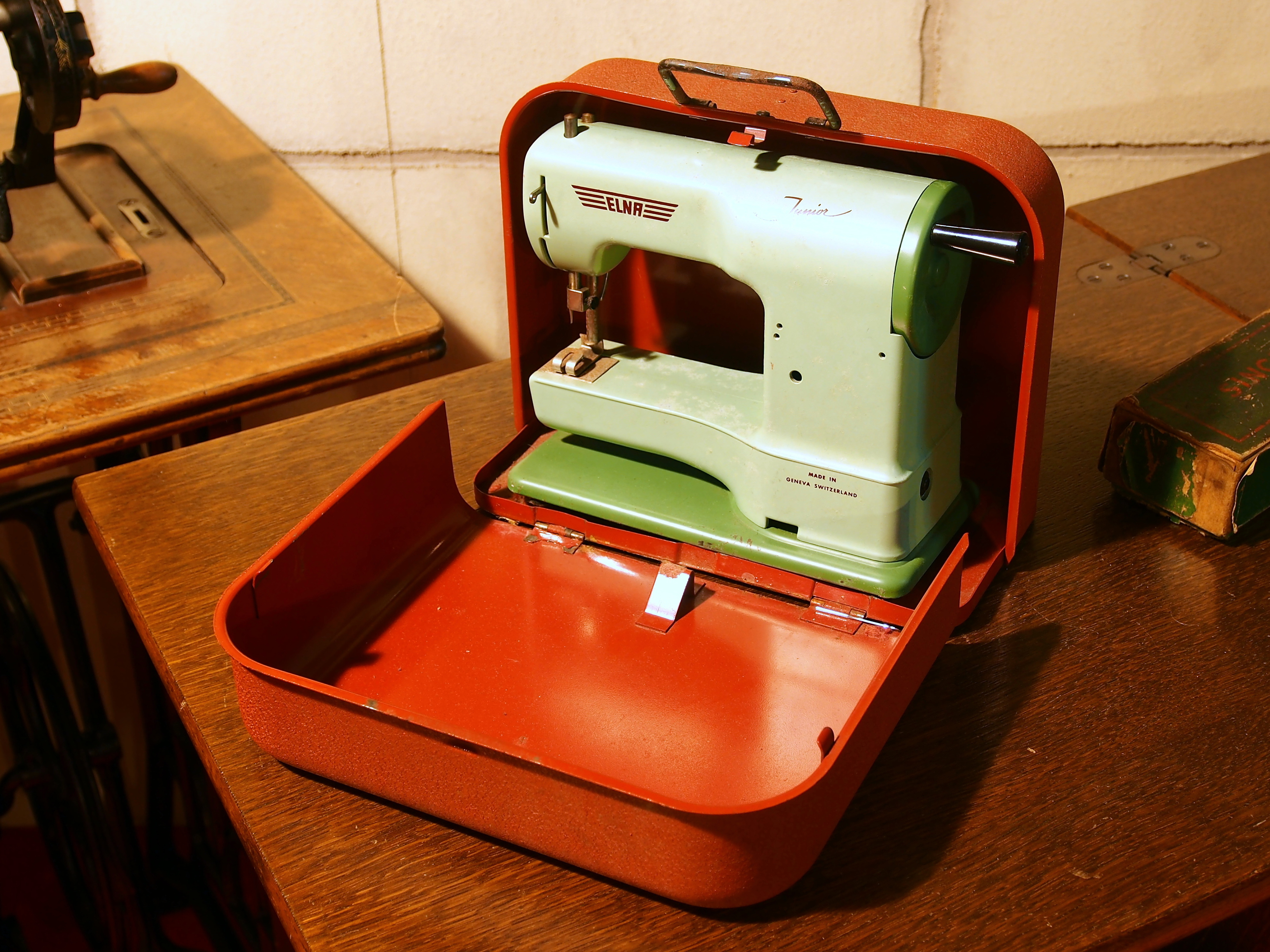
An Elna Junior toy sewing machine

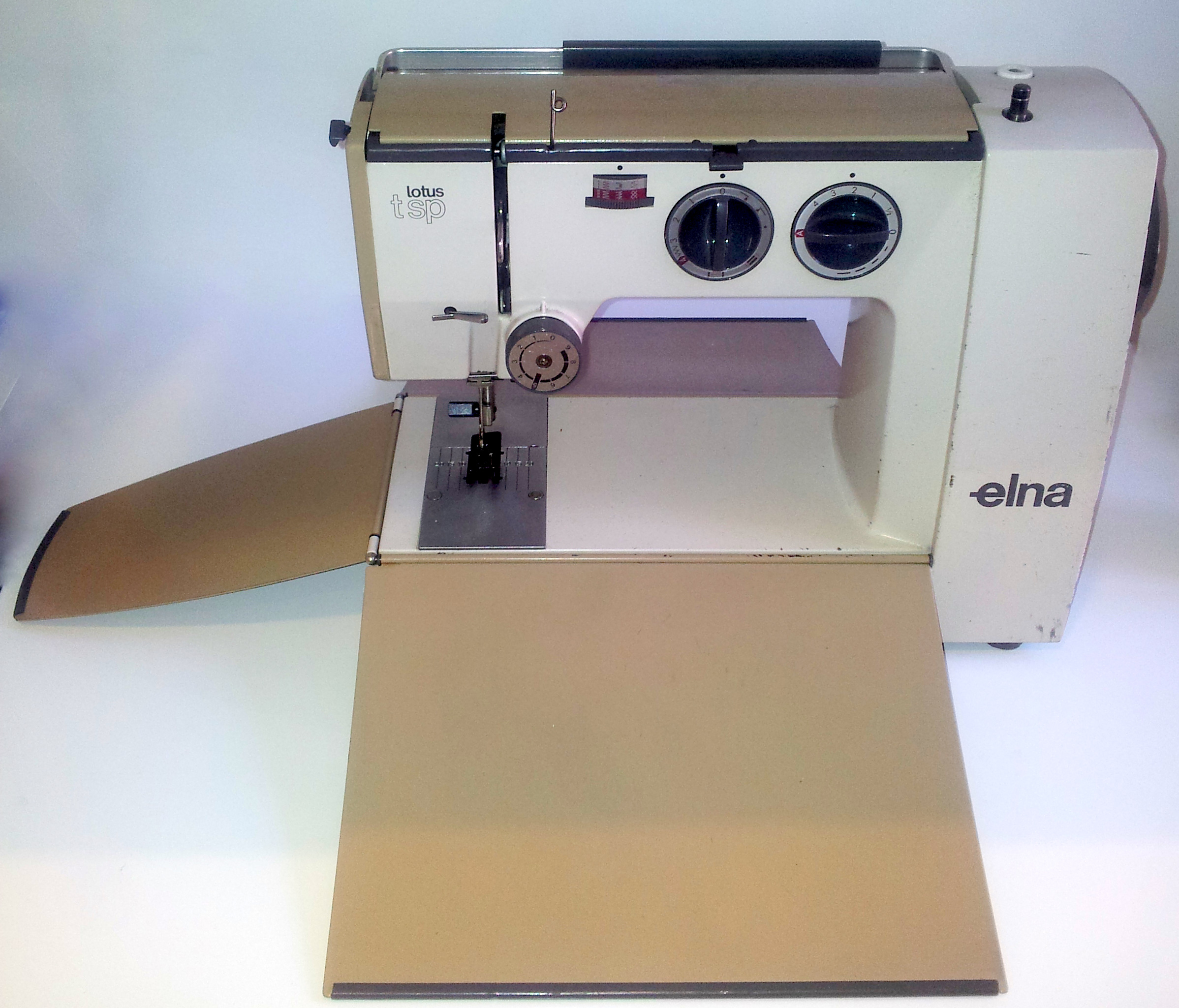
An Elna Lotus TSP

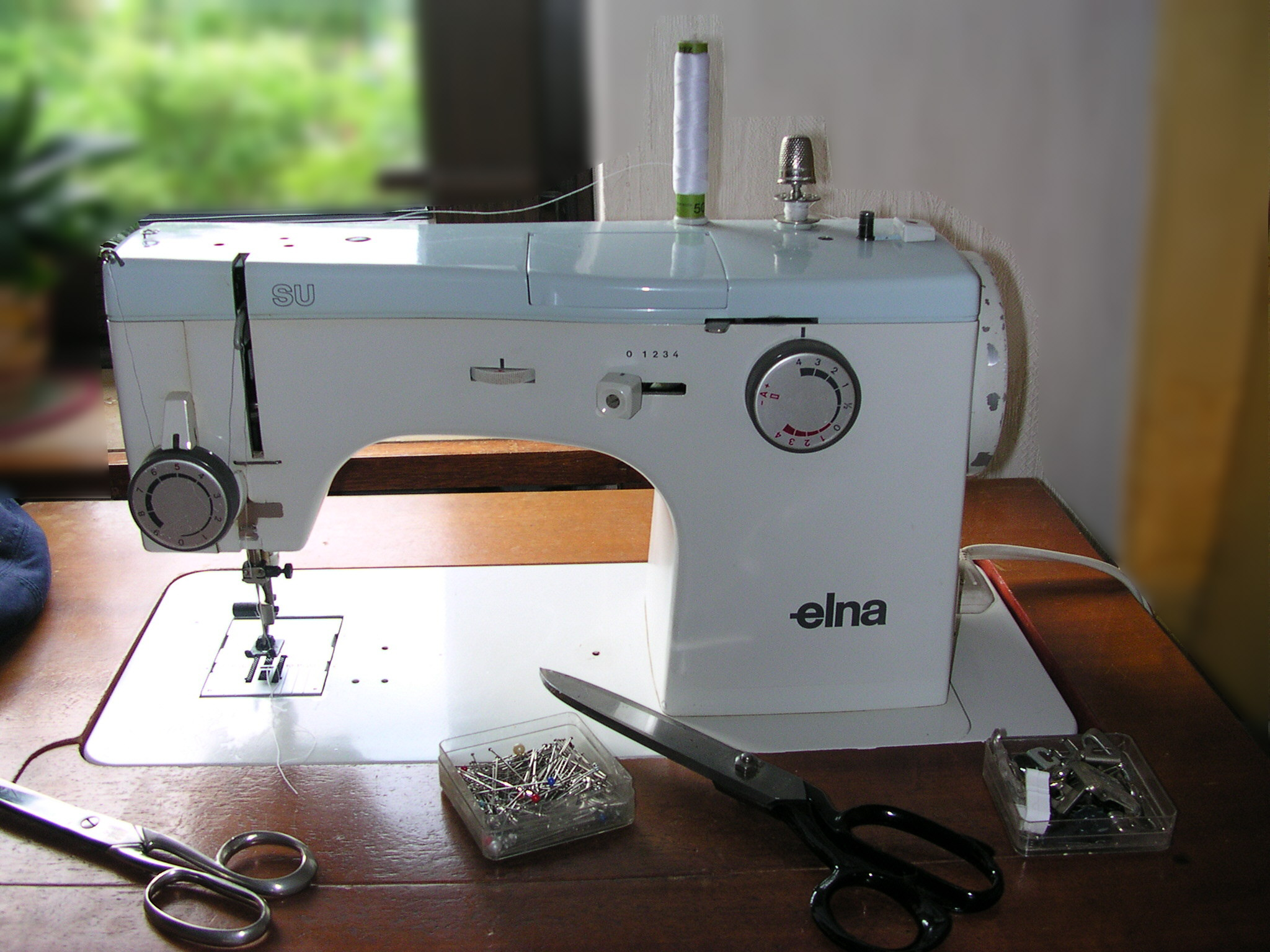
A flatbed Elna SU

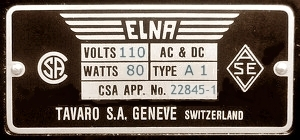
An Elna serial number plate

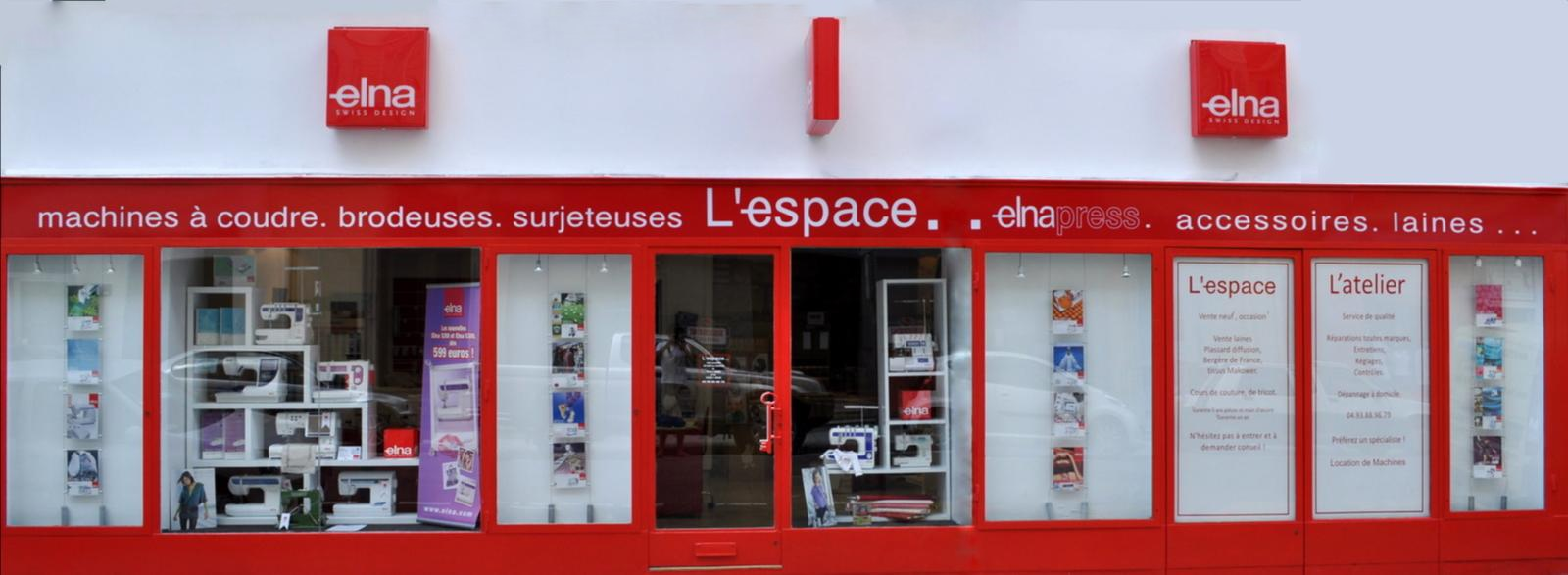
An Elna shop in Nice

== Decline and modern history ==
Elna's competitiveness declined sharply as imports from East Asia sharply undercut European manufacturers in price. The company was deregistered in 1995 and later absorbed by Janome.

== See also ==
- List of sewing machine brands
