= Club 328 =

IATA	ICAO	Call sign
-	SDJ	SPACEJET
- Founded: 2005
- Ceased operations: 2008
- Hubs: Southampton Airport
- Headquarters: Southampton, United Kingdom

Club 328 was a British air charter operator based at Southampton Airport. It operated executive jets for on-demand charters.

== History ==
Originally established in 2002 as Calljet, the airline subsequently operated under the names Ourjet and Bookajet. It was rebranded as Club 328 in 2003, and owned a Geneva, Switzerland-based subsidiary, Club Airways International. Club 328 Limited was a subsidiary of Corporate Jet Services Limited. Club 328 Limited held a United Kingdom Civil Aviation Authority Type B Operating Licence; it was permitted to carry passengers, cargo and mail on aircraft with fewer than 20 seats and/or weighing less than 10 tonnes.

Club 328 signed a deal with security provider, Veritas International Consultants, to provide chaperones for some of its high-profile customers. In October 2007, Club 328 was purchased by South of France-based operator/broker PlaneChartering, PlaneChartering went bankrupt in June 2008, with its Air Operator Certificate being revoked by the UK CAA.

== Fleet ==
The Club 328 fleet consisted of the following aircraft (at March 2008):

- BAe 125-800B
- Cessna Citation II

== See also ==
- List of defunct airlines of the United Kingdom
