= Monique Bauer-Lagier =

Swiss politician

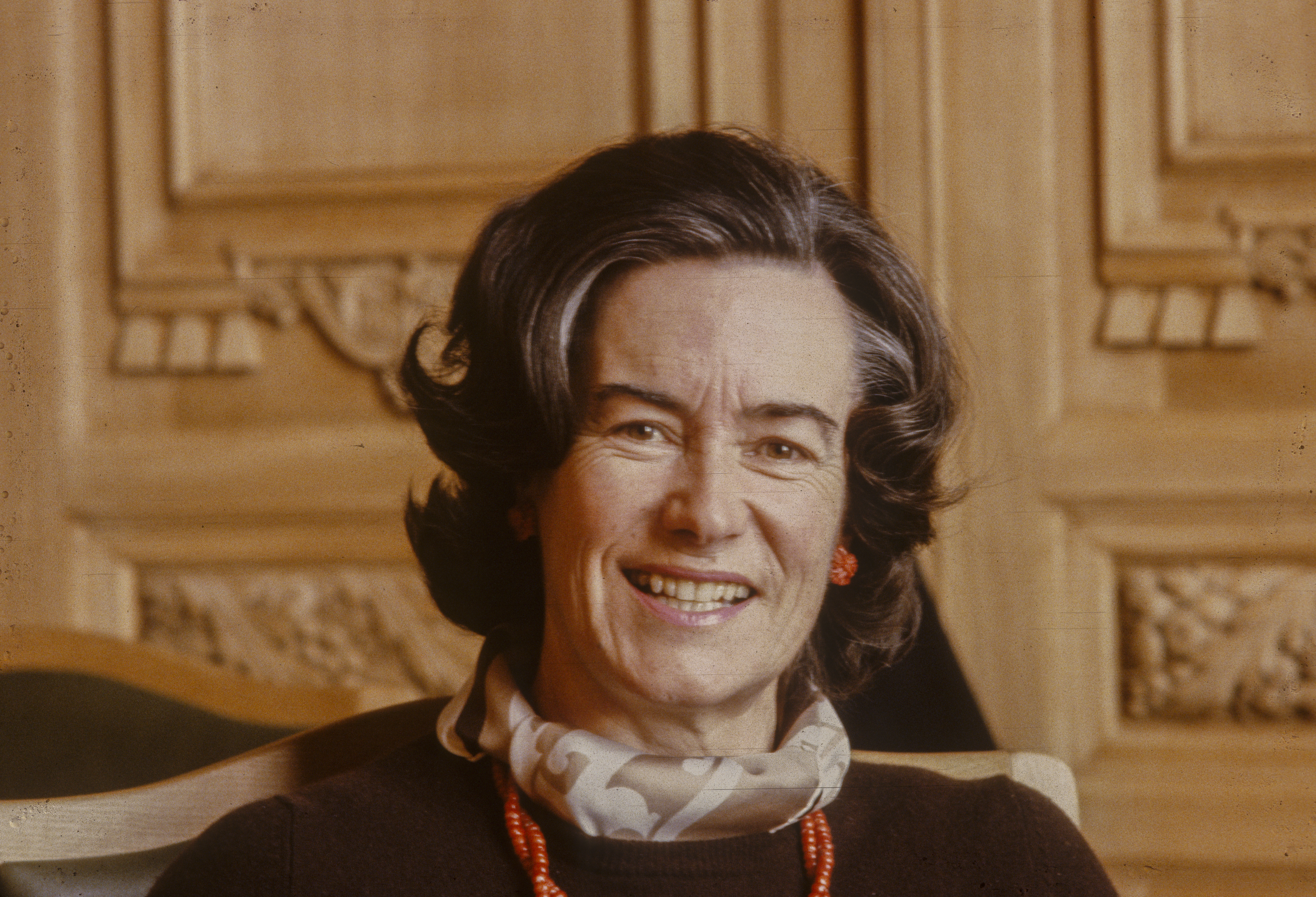
Monique Bauer-Lagier

Monique Bauer-Lagier (1 December 1922 - 19 February 2006) was a politician (LPS) in francophone Switzerland. For cantonal elections Geneva, her home canton and political base, introduced female suffrage as early as 1960, but at a national level Switzerland was more of a laggard, retaining male only voting for general elections till 1971. This meant that Bauer-Lagier was something of a trail blazer: women's rights featured strongly on her political agenda.

== Life ==
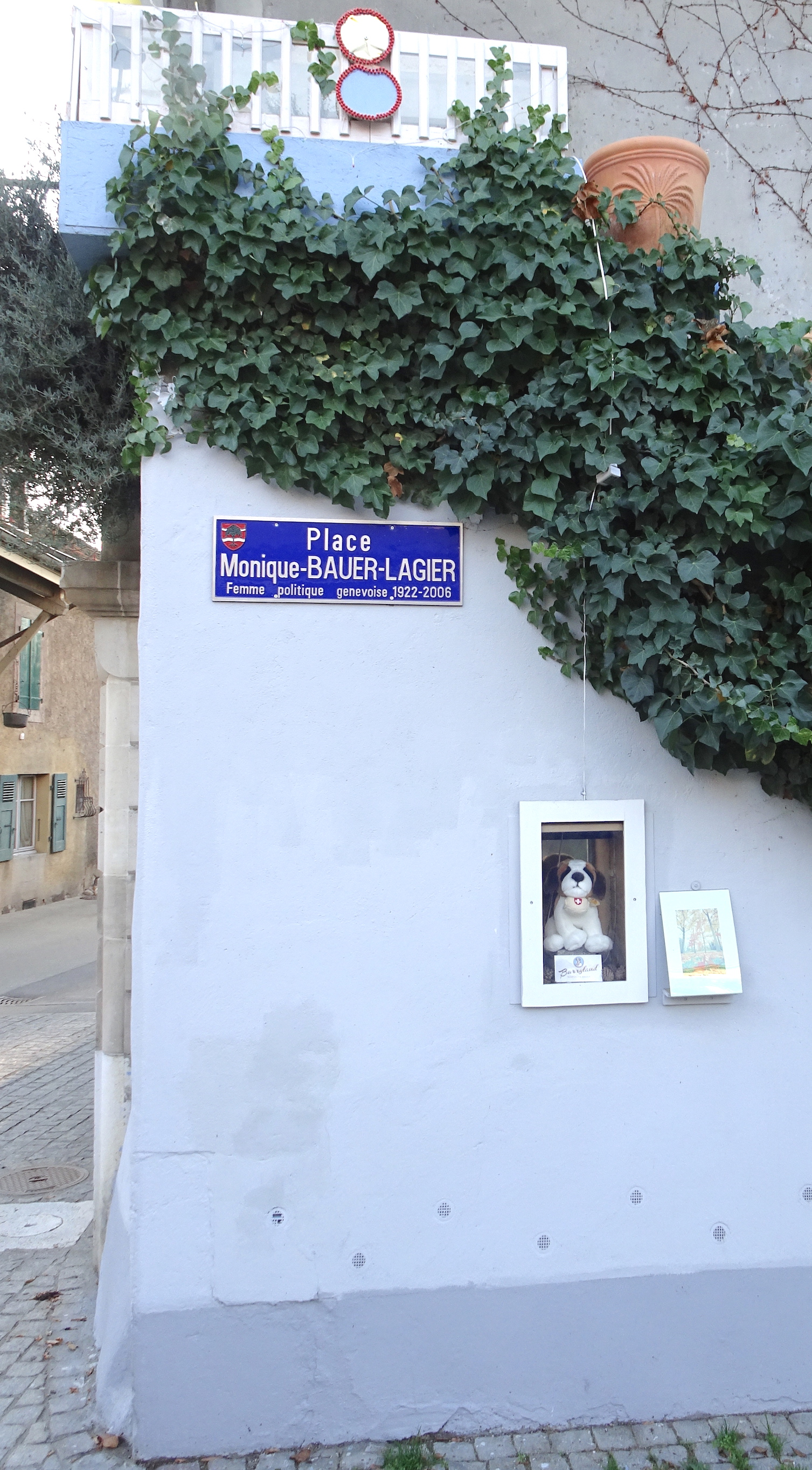
A square in Onex has been named after her in 2020.

Monique Lagier was born in Meyrin, then a farming village in the Canton of Geneva located a short distance to the north-west of the city. Jean and Thérèse Lagier, her parents, were teachers.

She underwent a classical education and passed her school leaving exams (Matura) in 1941. Being female she was not required to perform military service, instead going on directly to obtain a degree in Pedagogy from the Institute of Education Sciences (" Institut des sciences de l'éducation") in Geneva. After this she worked for eight years as a teacher. Her political career started with her election in 1973 to the Geneva cantonal parliament: she retained her seat till 1977. Meanwhile, in 1975 she was elected to the National Council - effectively the lower house of the Swiss federal parliament. She switched to the upper house in 1979, remaining a member till 1987. She also became a member of the national committee of the Liberal Party.

She supported women's rights and was a strong advocate for the new marriage law and for equal rights for men and women more broadly in government commissions. She focused on Minority rights, Ecological protection, a new economic world order internationally between north and south, and meaningful dialogue between east and west.

She was chair of several organisations - a parliamentary group for refugees, the International Geneva Peace Institute, Swiss Aids Support, Bread for All and the International Union of Swiss language parliamentarians.

== Personal ==
She married Paul-A. Bauer, a physician. The couple had three children.
