= Gustave Pictet =

Swiss lawyer and politician (1827–1900)

- Born: 24 April 1827; Geneva, Switzerland
- Died: 14 May 1900 (aged 73); Geneva, Switzerland
- Occupations: Lawyer, judge, politician
- Spouse: Louise-Amélie Lambert (m. 1851)
- Parents: Jules Pictet; Adélaïde de Candolle
- Relatives: Ernest Pictet (brother)

Gustave Pictet (24 April 1827 – 14 May 1900) was a Swiss lawyer, judge and politician from Geneva. He was a judge of the Federal Supreme Court of Switzerland in 1875–1876 and a substitute judge of the court from 1876 to 1900. He sat in the Grand Council of Geneva, in the National Council and, in 1890–1891, in the Council of States.

== Biography ==
Gustave Pictet was born in Geneva into the Pictet family, the son of Jules Pictet and Adélaïde née de Candolle. He was the brother of Ernest Pictet and a great-nephew of Augustin Pyramus de Candolle. In 1851 he married Louise-Amélie Lambert, daughter of Ferdinand Lambert, a French lawyer.

Pictet studied law in Heidelberg in 1846, in Paris in 1847–1848 and in Geneva from 1848 to 1851, where he obtained a doctorate. He practiced as a lawyer in Geneva from 1851 to 1874 and from 1884 to 1900. In 1851 he was a deputy justice of the peace (juge de paix suppléant). He was a judge of the Federal Supreme Court in 1875–1876 and then a substitute judge from 1876 to 1900. From 1876 to 1884 he was a justice of the peace in Geneva.

Pictet sat in the Grand Council of Geneva in 1854–1855 and from 1864 to 1890. He was a member of the National Council in 1872–1874, 1878–1881 and 1884–1887, and of the Council of States in 1890–1891. A convinced Democrat (démocrate), he opposed throughout his career both the uncompromising radicalism embodied by James Fazy and federal centralism.

== Bibliography ==
- E. Gruner, Die schweizerische Bundesversammlung 1848–1920, 1, 1966, 963
- J.-D. Candaux, Histoire de la famille Pictet, 1474–1974, 2, 1974, 473–482
- S. and S. Stelling-Michaud (eds.), Le Livre du Recteur de l'Académie de Genève (1559–1878), 5, 176–177

=== Archives ===
- Papers in the Library of Geneva (Bibliothèque de Genève)
