= Meyrin =

- Municipality
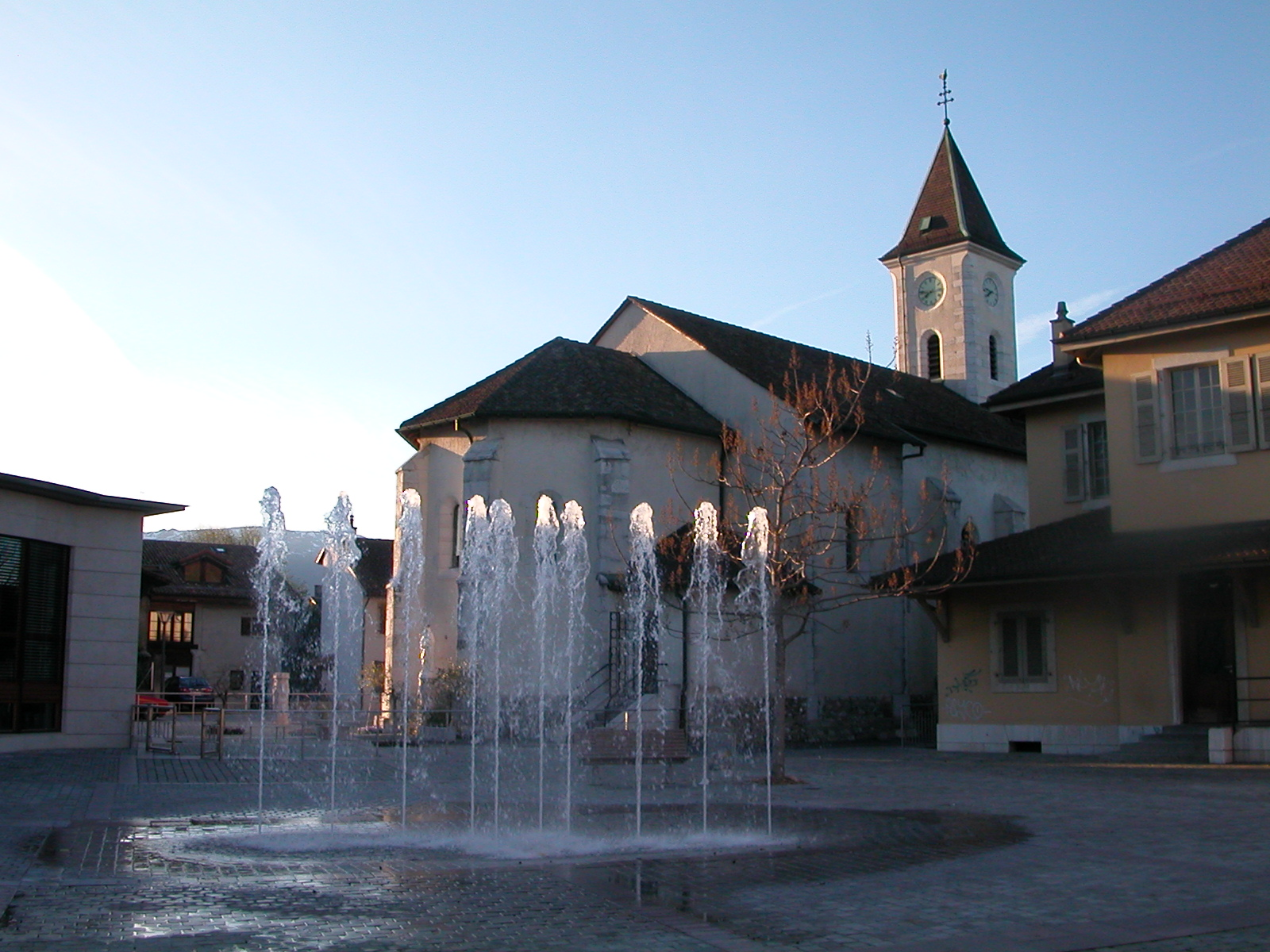
- Meyrin village church and square

- Flag Coat of arms
- Location of Meyrin
- Location within Switzerland Location within Canton of Geneva
- Coordinates: 46°13′N 06°04′E
- Country: Switzerland
- Canton: Geneva
- District: n.a.

Government
  - Mayor: Maire; Eric Cornuz GPS (as of 2024)

Area
  - Total: 9.94 km^{2} (3.84 sq mi)
- Elevation: 446 m (1,463 ft)

Population (December 2020)
  - Total: 26,129
  - Density: 2,630/km^{2} (6,810/sq mi)
- Time zone: UTC+01:00 (CET)
  - Summer (DST): UTC+02:00 (CEST)
- Postal code: 1217
- SFOS number: 6630
- ISO 3166 code: CH-GE
- Surrounded by: Ferney-Voltaire (FR-01), Grand-Saconnex, Prévessin-Moëns (FR-01), Satigny, Vernier
- Website: www.meyrin.ch

Meyrin (French pronunciation: [mɛʁɛ̃]) is a municipality of the Canton of Geneva, Switzerland.

The main site of CERN, the European particle physics research organisation, is in Meyrin. Meyrin was originally a small agricultural village until the 1950s, when construction of CERN began just to the north. It is now a commuter town dominated with apartment high-rises, and many of its residents work at CERN or in central Geneva. Geneva International Airport is partially located within Meyrin.

== History ==
Meyrin is first mentioned in 1153 as Mairin.

== Geography ==
Aerial view (1953)

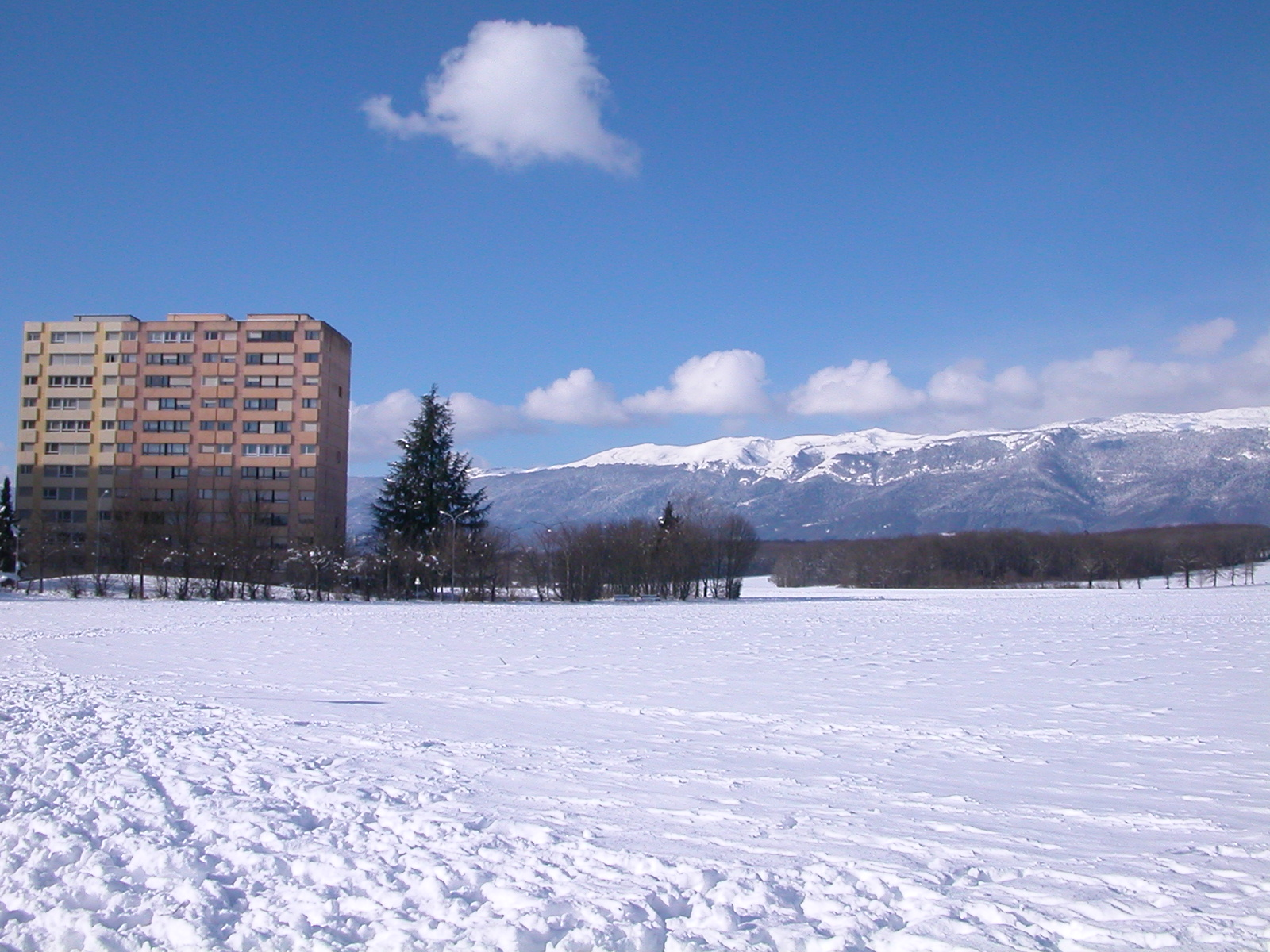
Snow around an apartment complex on the outskirts of Meyrin

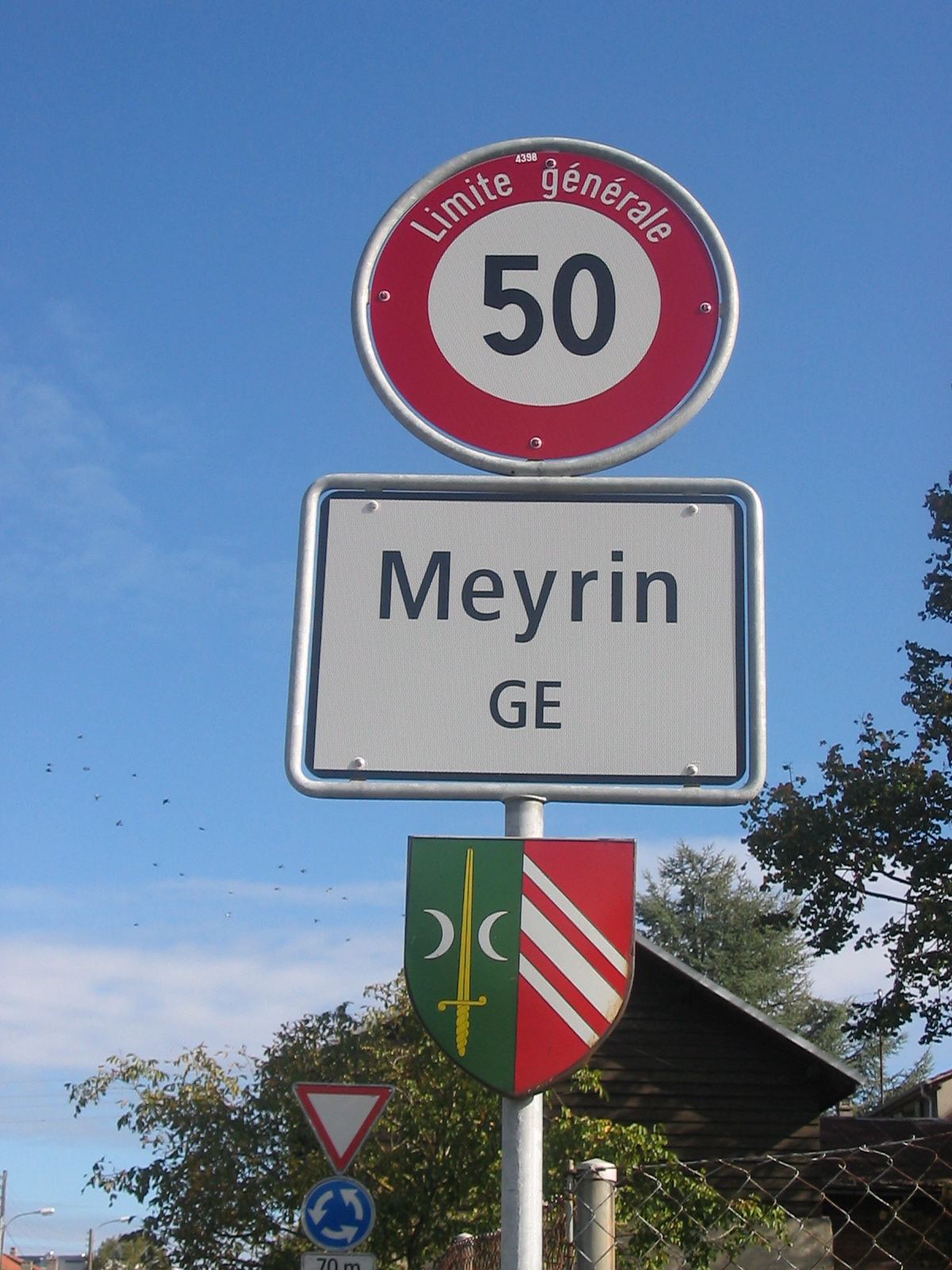
This sign at the western edge of Meyrin features the coat of arms of the community.

Meyrin has an area, as of 2009, of 9.94 square kilometers (3.84 sq mi). Of this area, 3.54 km^{2} (1.37 sq mi) or 35.6% is used for agricultural purposes, while 0.43 km^{2} (0.17 sq mi) or 4.3% is forested. Of the rest of the land, 5.87 km^{2} (2.27 sq mi) or 59.1% is settled (buildings or roads), 0.01 km^{2} (2.5 acres) or 0.1% is either rivers or lakes and 0.08 km^{2} (20 acres) or 0.8% is unproductive land.

Of the built up area, industrial buildings made up 11.1% of the total area while housing and buildings made up 17.7% and transportation infrastructure made up 25.8%. while parks, green belts and sports fields made up 3.5%. Out of the forested land, all of the forested land area is covered with heavy forests. Of the agricultural land, 28.5% is used for growing crops and 4.8% is pastures, while 2.3% is used for orchards or vine crops. All the water in the municipality is in lakes.

The municipality is located on the right bank of the Rhone river and consists of the sub-sections or villages of CERN, Maisonnex, Mategnin, Citadelle, Aéroport - Tour-de-Contrôle, Aéroport - Papillons, Aéroport - Forestier, Cointrin - Les Sapins, Cointrin - Les Ailes, Cointrin - Pré-Bois, ZI Riantbosson.

== Demographics ==
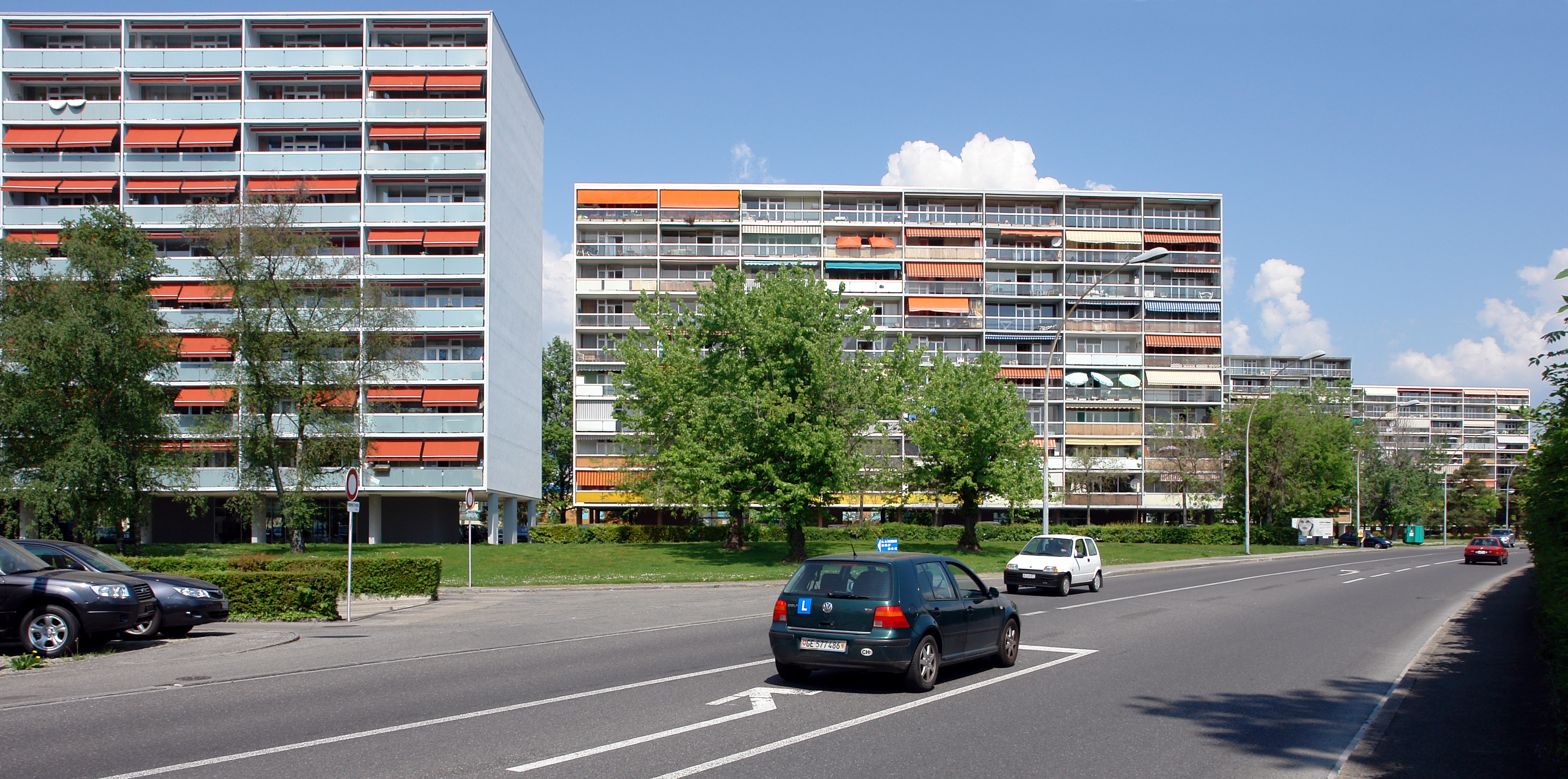
Apartment blocks in Meyrin

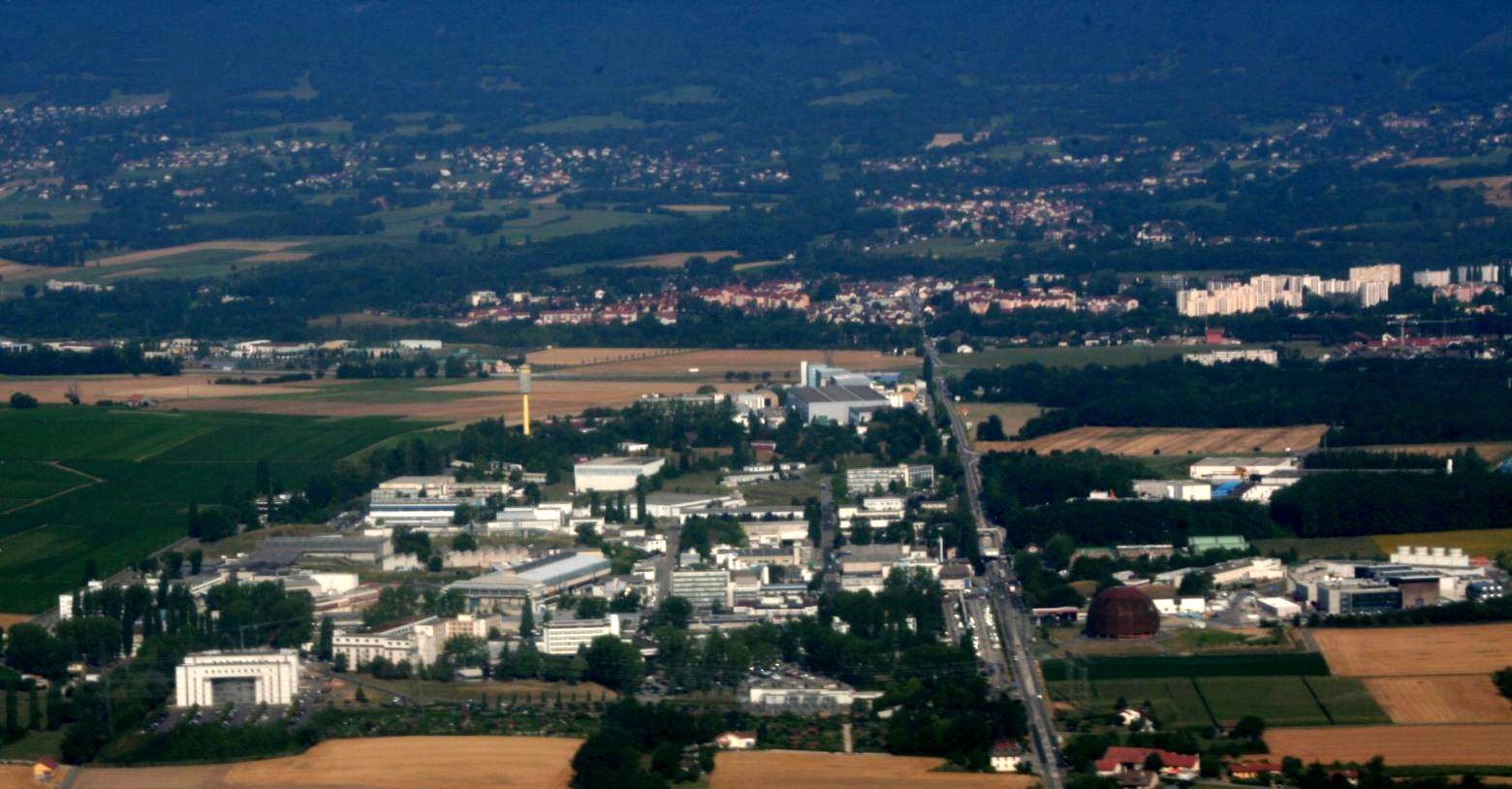
Aerial view of CERN near Meyrin

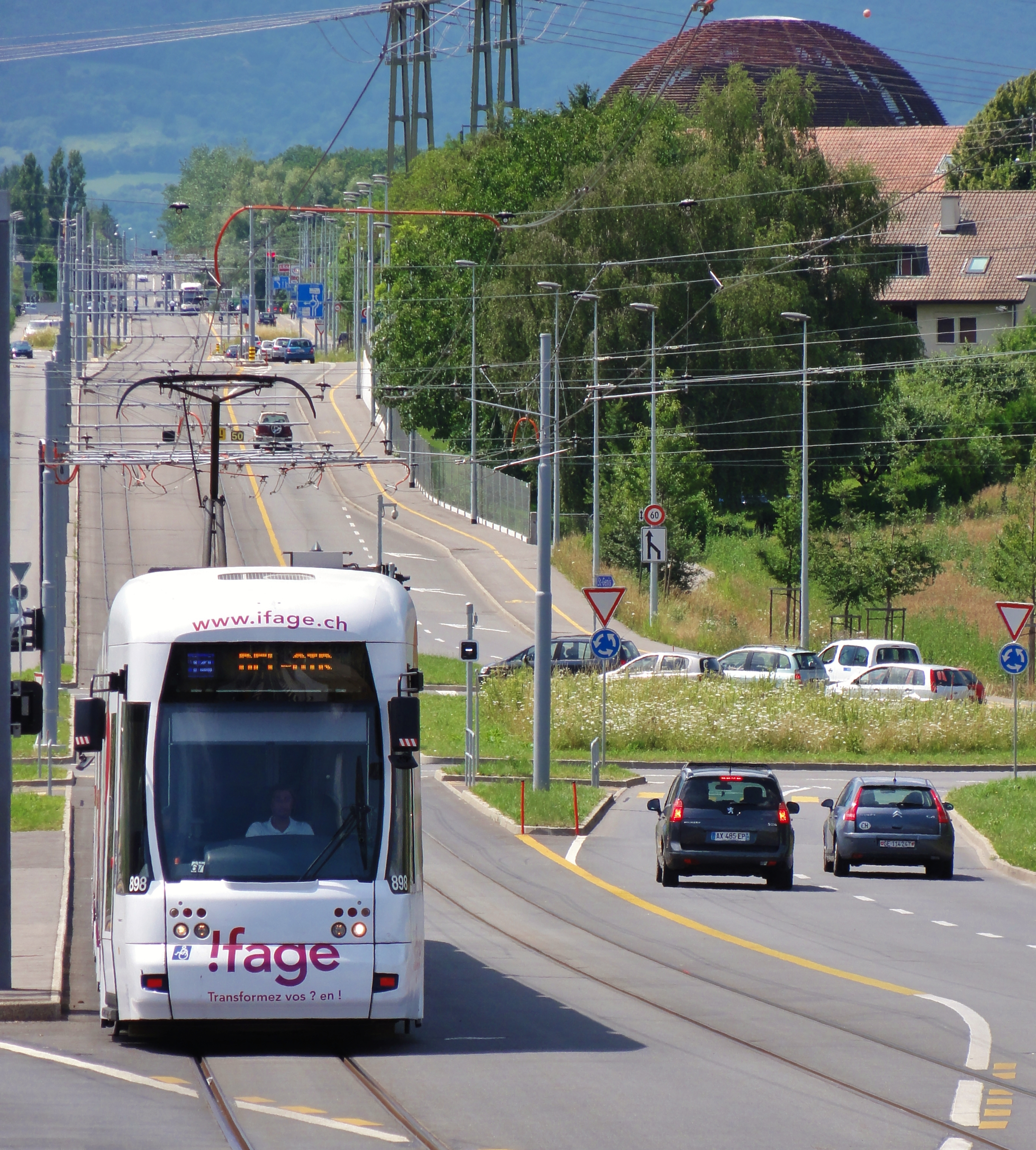
TCMC (Tramway Cornavin - Meyrin - CERN) at the stop of TPG n° 18 ligne - Hôpital de La Tour

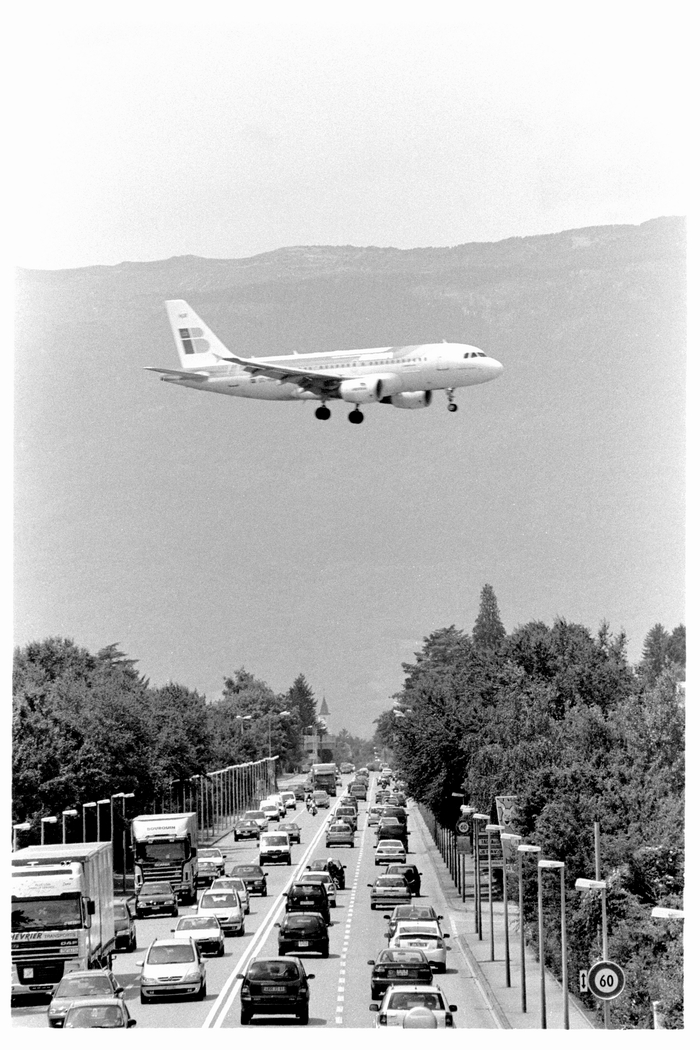
Airplane flying over Route de Meyrin

Meyrin has a population (as of December 2020) of 26,129. As of 2008, 41.5% of the population are resident foreign nationals. Over the last 10 years (1999–2009) the population has changed at a rate of 13.7%. It has changed at a rate of 7.5% due to migration and at a rate of 6.3% due to births and deaths.

Most of the population (as of 2000) speaks French (14,320 or 73.3%), with German being second most common (817 or 4.2%) and Italian being third (809 or 4.1%). There are 12 people who speak Romansh.

As of 2008, the gender distribution of the population was 49.9% male and 50.1% female. The population was made up of 5,617 Swiss men (25.8% of the population) and 5,233 (24.1%) non-Swiss men. There were 6,457 Swiss women (29.7%) and 4,424 (20.4%) non-Swiss women. Of the population in the municipality 3,745 or about 19.2% were born in Meyrin and lived there in 2000. There were 3,273 or 16.7% who were born in the same canton, while 2,876 or 14.7% were born somewhere else in Switzerland, and 7,985 or 40.8% were born outside of Switzerland.

In 2008 there were 144 live births to Swiss citizens and 109 births to non-Swiss citizens, and in same time span there were 78 deaths of Swiss citizens and 21 non-Swiss citizen deaths. Ignoring immigration and emigration, the population of Swiss citizens increased by 66 while the foreign population increased by 88. There were 28 Swiss men and 57 Swiss women who emigrated from Switzerland. At the same time, there were 230 non-Swiss men and 204 non-Swiss women who immigrated from another country to Switzerland. The total Swiss population change in 2008 (from all sources, including moves across municipal borders) was an increase of 79 and the non-Swiss population increased by 356 people. This represents a population growth rate of 2.2%.

The age distribution of the population (as of 2000) is children and teenagers (0–19 years old) make up 22.6% of the population, while adults (20–64 years old) make up 66.1% and seniors (over 64 years old) make up 11.3%.

As of 2000, there were 7,660 people who were single and never married in the municipality. There were 9,707 married individuals, 748 widows or widowers and 1,433 individuals who are divorced.

As of 2000, there were 7,938 private households in the municipality, and an average of 2.3 persons per household. There were 2,662 households that consist of only one person and 410 households with five or more people. Out of a total of 8,158 households that answered this question, 32.6% were households made up of just one person and there were 42 adults who lived with their parents. Of the rest of the households, there are 1,985 married couples without children, 2,487 married couples with children There were 660 single parents with a child or children. There were 102 households that were made up of unrelated people and 220 households that were made up of some sort of institution or another collective housing.

In 2000 there were 579 single family homes (or 47.0% of the total) out of a total of 1,232 inhabited buildings. There were 410 multi-family buildings (33.3%), along with 174 multi-purpose buildings that were mostly used for housing (14.1%) and 69 other use buildings (commercial or industrial) that also had some housing (5.6%). Of the single family homes 53 were built before 1919, while 87 were built between 1990 and 2000. The greatest number of single family homes (103) were built between 1971 and 1980.

In 2000 there were 8,692 apartments in the municipality. The most common apartment size was 3 rooms of which there were 2,677. There were 787 single room apartments and 1,260 apartments with five or more rooms. Of these apartments, a total of 7,734 apartments (89.0% of the total) were permanently occupied, while 776 apartments (8.9%) were seasonally occupied and 182 apartments (2.1%) were empty. As of 2009, the construction rate of new housing units was 2 new units per 1000 residents. The vacancy rate for the municipality, in 2010, was 0.16%.

The historical population is given in the following chart:

== Heritage sites of national significance ==
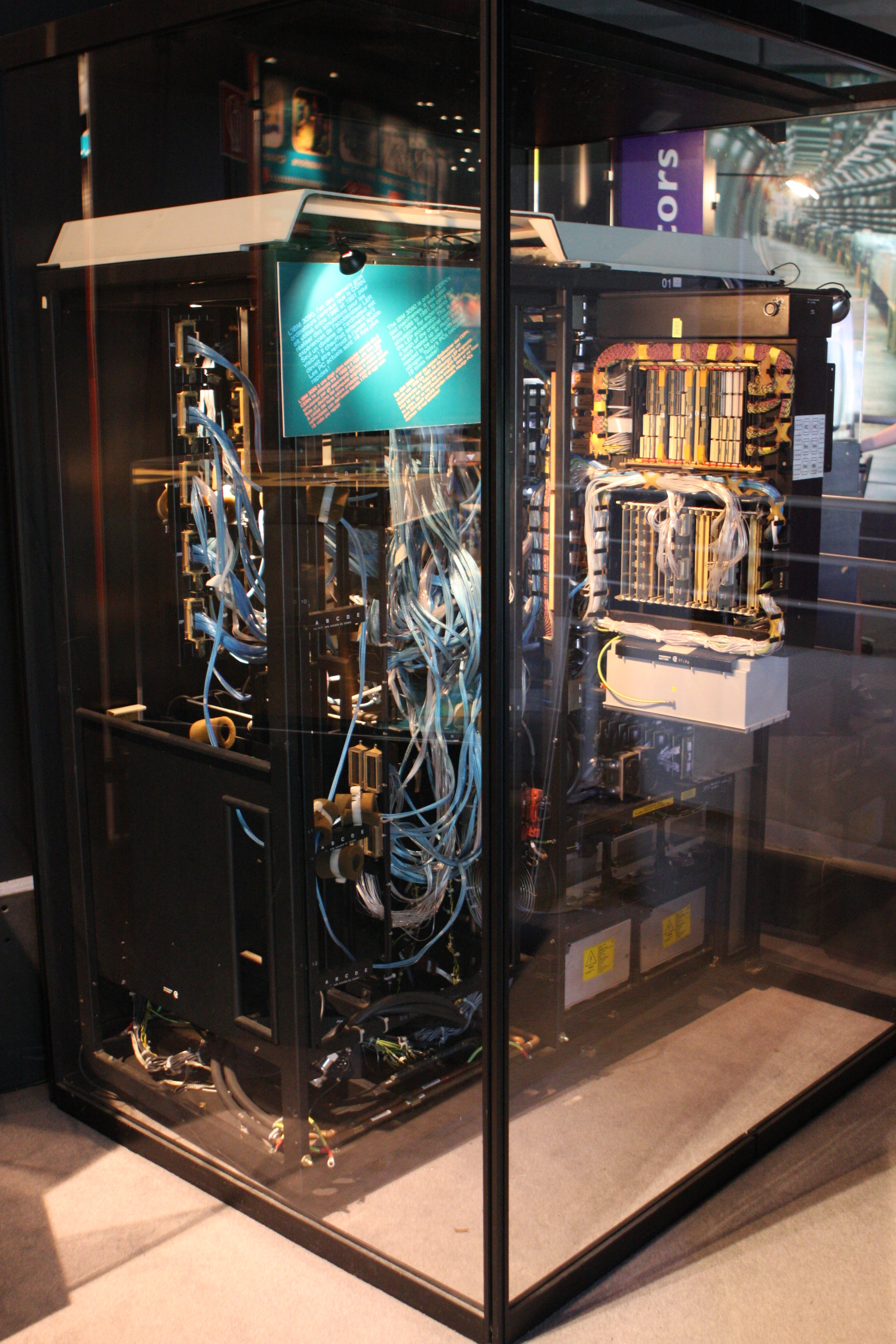
Old server in the CERN museum

The Mani House and the CERN Archives are listed as Swiss heritage site of national significance.

== Politics ==
In the 2007 federal election the most popular party was the SVP which received 25.6% of the vote. The next three most popular parties were the SP (19.67%), the Green Party (14.62%) and the FDP (9.92%). In the federal election, a total of 4,041 votes were cast, and the voter turnout was 42.6%.

In the 2009 Grand Conseil election, there were a total of 9,517 registered voters of which 3,437 (36.1%) voted. The most popular party in the municipality for this election was the MCG with 21.0% of the ballots. In the canton-wide election they received the third highest proportion of votes. The second most popular party was the Les Socialistes (with 11.4%), they were fourth in the canton-wide election, while the third most popular party was the Les Verts (with 11.3%), they were second in the canton-wide election.

For the 2009 Conseil d'Etat election, there were a total of 9,525 registered voters of which 4,070 (42.7%) voted.

In 2011, all the municipalities held local elections, and in Meyrin there were 33 spots open on the municipal council. There were a total of 13,619 registered voters of which 5,043 (37.0%) voted. Out of the 5,043 votes, there were 24 blank votes, 68 null or unreadable votes and 333 votes with a name that was not on the list.

== Economy ==
As of 2010, Meyrin had an unemployment rate of 7%. As of 2008, there were 50 people employed in the primary economic sector and about 13 businesses involved in this sector. 4,198 people were employed in the secondary sector and there were 197 businesses in this sector. 13,422 people were employed in the tertiary sector, with 860 businesses in this sector. There were 10,137 residents of the municipality who were employed in some capacity, of which females made up 43.9% of the workforce.

In 2008 the total number of full-time equivalent jobs was 16,303. The number of jobs in the primary sector was 40, all of which were in agriculture. The number of jobs in the secondary sector was 4,078 of which 2,991 or (73.3%) were in manufacturing and 1,066 (26.1%) were in construction. The number of jobs in the tertiary sector was 12,185. In the tertiary sector; 3,671 or 30.1% were in wholesale or retail sales or the repair of motor vehicles, 1,984 or 16.3% were in the movement and storage of goods, 1,145 or 9.4% were in a hotel or restaurant, 396 or 3.2% were in the information industry, 366 or 3.0% were the insurance or financial industry, 835 or 6.9% were technical professionals or scientists, 261 or 2.1% were in education and 1,466 or 12.0% were in health care.

In 2000, there were 15,939 workers who commuted into the municipality and 7,242 workers who commuted away. The municipality is a net importer of workers, with about 2.2 workers entering the municipality for every one leaving. About 13.9% of the workforce coming into Meyrin are coming from outside Switzerland, while 0.2% of the locals commute out of Switzerland for work. Of the working population, 28.2% used public transportation to get to work, and 55.5% used a private car.

Skyguide, the Swiss air traffic control company, has its main office in Meyrin, on the grounds of the airport. EasyJet Switzerland has its head office in Meyrin. Club Airways International has its head office on the grounds of Geneva Airport and in Meyrin. Hewlett-Packard operates its Europe, Middle East, and Africa office in Meyrin.

The Swiss watch and jewellery designer and manufacture Chopard has its global headquarters in Meyrin. It is also where most watches, including lines such as the Mille Miglia and Happy Sporty, are made, as well as jewellery the Palme d'Or for the Cannes Film Festival. The other site, based in Fleurier, produces a lot of the L.U.Chopard watches.

== Religion ==
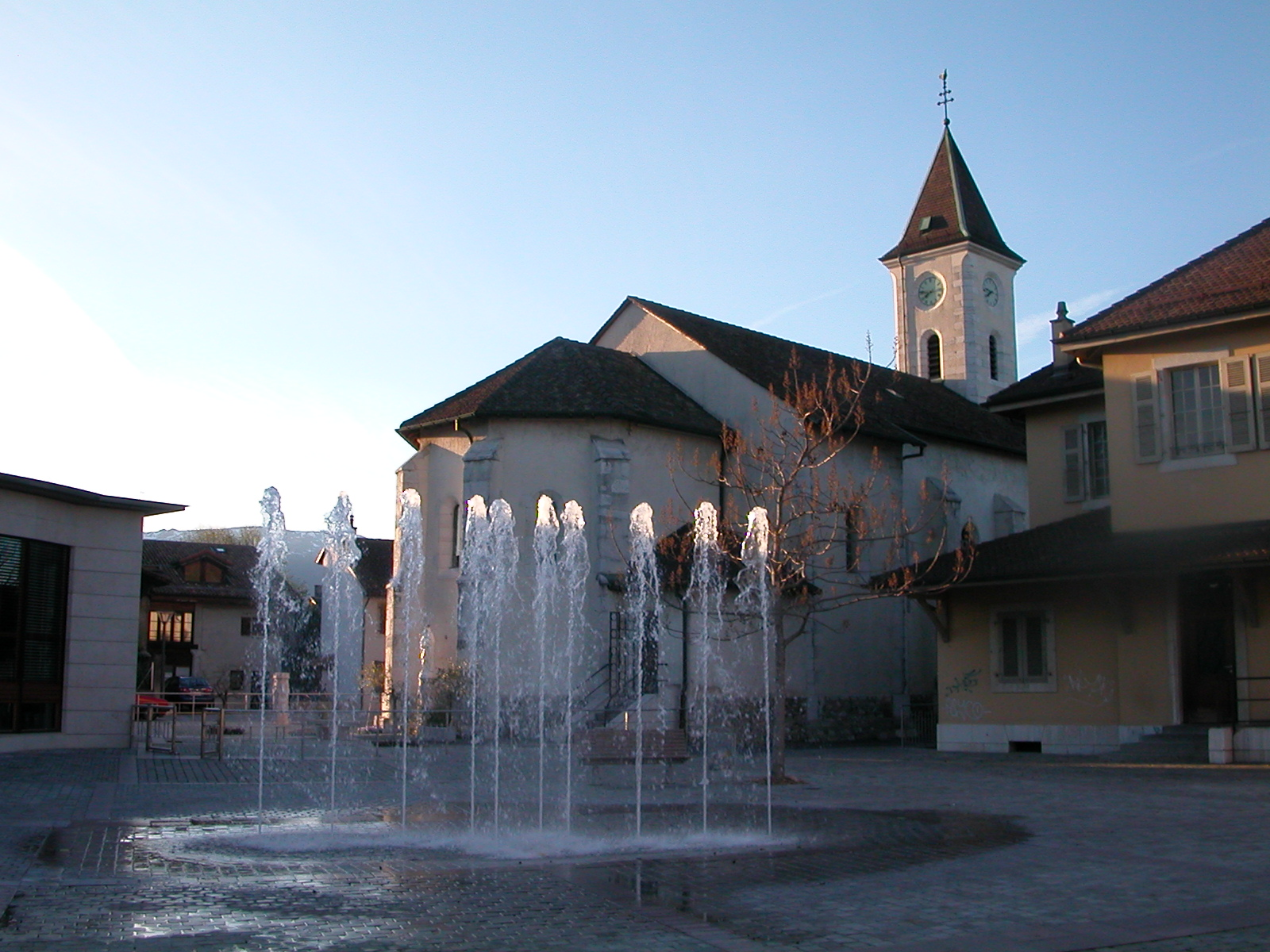
Meyrin village church

From the 2000 census, 7,833 or 40.1% were Roman Catholic, while 2,867 or 14.7% belonged to the Swiss Reformed Church. Of the rest of the population, there were 281 members of an Orthodox church (or about 1.44% of the population), there were 28 individuals (or about 0.14% of the population) who belonged to the Christian Catholic Church, and there were 363 individuals (or about 1.86% of the population) who belonged to another Christian church. There were 60 individuals (or about 0.31% of the population) who were Jewish, and 1,207 (or about 6.17% of the population) who were Muslim. There were 104 individuals who were Buddhist, 51 individuals who were Hindu and 36 individuals who belonged to another church. 4,186 (or about 21.41% of the population) belonged to no church, are agnostic or atheist, and 2,532 individuals (or about 12.95% of the population) did not answer the question.

== Education ==
In Meyrin about 5,924 or (30.3%) of the population have completed non-mandatory upper secondary education, and 2,712 or (13.9%) have completed additional higher education (either university or a Fachhochschule). Of the 2,712 who completed tertiary schooling, 34.8% were Swiss men, 24.3% were Swiss women, 24.3% were non-Swiss men and 16.6% were non-Swiss women.

During the 2009–2010 school year there were a total of 4,126 students in the Meyrin school system. The education system in the Canton of Geneva allows young children to attend two years of non-obligatory Kindergarten. During that school year, there were 285 children who were in a pre-kindergarten class. The canton's school system provides two years of non-mandatory kindergarten and requires students to attend six years of primary school, with some of the children attending smaller, specialized classes. In Meyrin there were 712 students in kindergarten or primary school and 93 students were in the special, smaller classes. The secondary school program consists of three lower, obligatory years of schooling, followed by three to five years of optional, advanced schools. There were 712 lower secondary students who attended school in Meyrin. There were 1,010 upper secondary students from the municipality along with 164 students who were in a professional, non-university track program. An additional 153 students attended a private school.

As of 2000, there were 341 students in Meyrin who came from another municipality, while 1,147 residents attended schools outside the municipality.

=== Schools ===
Meyrin has 6 public primary schools, including Bellavista / Boudines, Champs-Fréchets / Cointrin, De-Livron / Golette, and Meyrin-Monthoux / Meyrin-Village.

=== Public libraries ===
Meyrin has a bibliotheque municipale within the Forum Meyrin theatre complex.

== Transportation ==
The municipality has two railway stations, Meyrin and Zimeysa. Both are on the Lyon–Geneva line and have regular service to La Plaine, Bellegarde, and Geneva.

== Sport ==
FC Meyrin is the municipality's football club.

CP Meyrin is the town's ice hockey team. They currently play in the 1st division, the fourth tier of Swiss ice hockey. They play their home games in the 800-seat Patinoire des Vergers.

== Notable people ==
- Louis Rendu (1789 in Meyrin – 1859) French Roman Catholic Bishop of Annecy and a scientist.
- Emma Kammacher (1904 in Meyrin – 1981) lawyer, activist and politician
- Monique Bauer-Lagier (1922 in Meyrin - 2006) politician, women's rights featured strongly on her political agenda.
- Séverine Pont-Combe (born 1979 in Meyrin) ski mountaineer and long-distance runner
- Mwambutsa IV Bangiricenge, Mwami of the Kingdom of Burundi is interred in Meyrin.
- Nicholas Medforth-Mills (born 1985 in Meyrin) formerly Prince Nicholas of Romania, son of Princess Elena of Romania and grandson of Michael I
- Alexander, Archduke of Austria (born in Meyrin in 1990)
