= Estelle Revaz =

Swiss cellist and politician (born 1989)

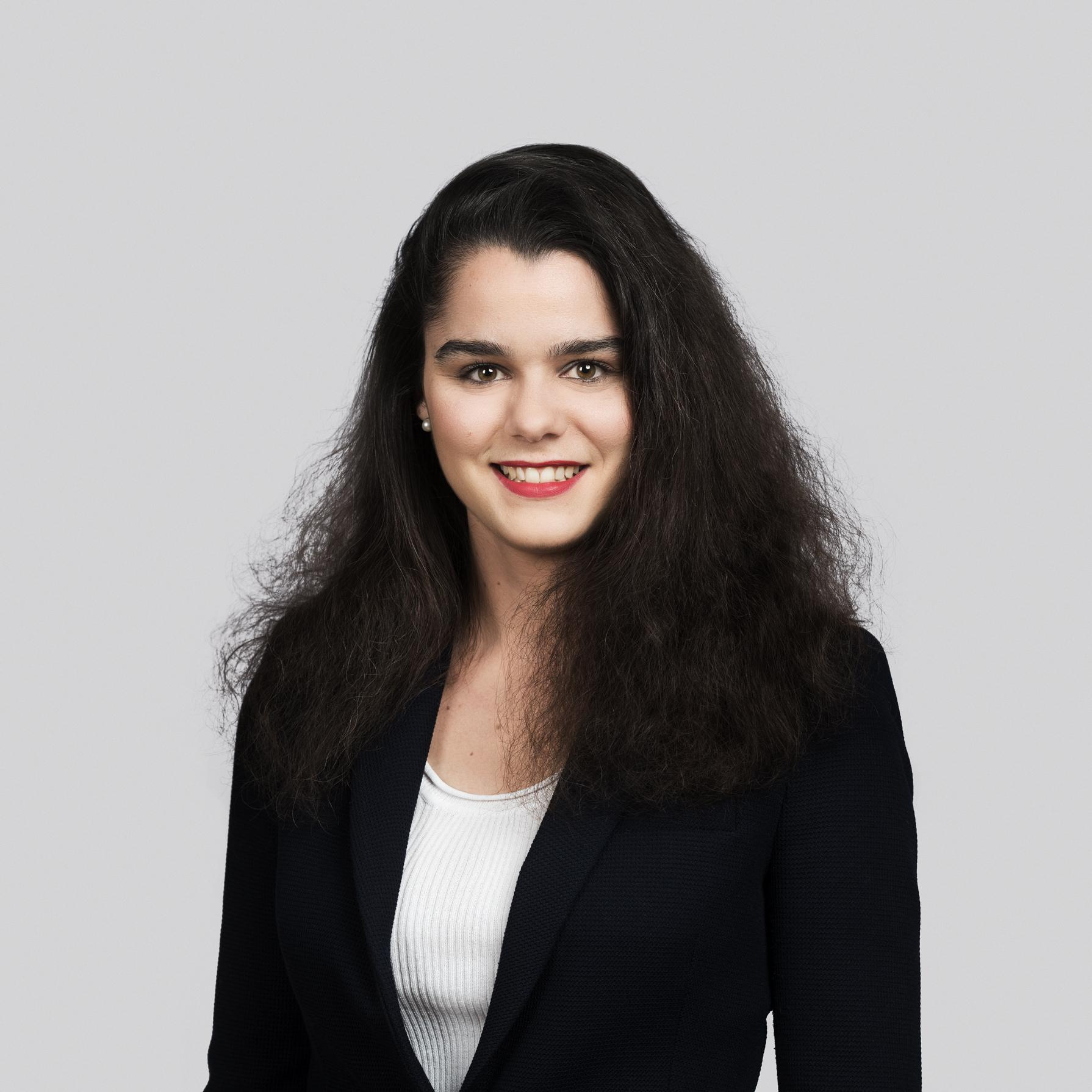
- Official portrait, 2023

Member of the National Council (Switzerland)
- Incumbent
- Assumed office 4 December 2023
- Preceded by: Carlo Sommaruga
- Constituency: Canton of Geneva

Personal details
- Born: Estelle Revaz; 12 July 1989 (age 37) Martigny, Switzerland
- Citizenship: Switzerland; Austria
- Education: Conservatoire de Paris; Hochschule für Musik und Tanz Köln
- Occupation: Cellist, docent and politician
- Website: Official website Parliament website

Estelle Revaz (French pronunciation: [ɛstɛl ʁəvaz]; born 12 July 1989 in Martigny) is a Swiss cellist, docent and politician who currently serves on the National Council (Switzerland) for the Social Democratic Party since 2023.

== Early life and education ==
Revaz was born 12 July 1989 in Martigny, Switzerland, to Jean-Charles Revaz, a researcher of classical literature, and Jeannine Revaz (née Michel), an Austrian-born singer. She has a younger brother, Tristan Revaz.

Until age 10, Revaz was raised in Salvan, Switzerland and studied music at the Conservatory of Sierre in Sierre. In 1999, aged 10, she and her family relocated to Paris, France. There she was educated further at the Conservatoire de Paris, primarily by Jérôme Pernoo, and in Germany at the Hochschule für Musik und Tanz Köln in Cologne, Germany by Maria Kliegel.

== Politics ==
She joined the Social Democratic Party and was ultimately elected during the 2023 Swiss federal election. Since 4 December 2023 she serves on the National Council of Switzerland.
