= Ernest Pictet =

Swiss banker and politician (1829–1909)

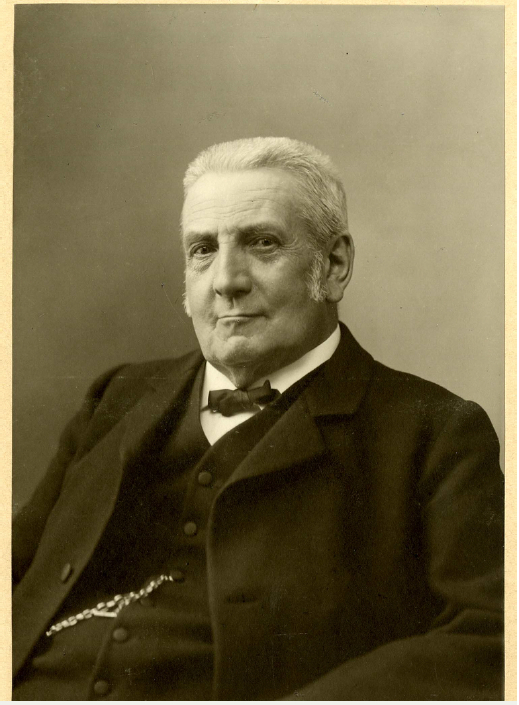
- Photograph by Frédéric Boissonnas
- Born: 9 July 1829; Le Petit-Saconnex (now Geneva), Switzerland
- Died: 19 August 1909 (aged 80); Le Petit-Saconnex, Switzerland
- Occupations: Banker, politician
- Spouse: Gabrielle Elisabeth Fuzier-Cayla
- Relatives: Gustave Pictet (brother)

Ernest Pictet (9 July 1829 – 19 August 1909) was a Swiss banker and politician from Geneva. He was a partner in the bank Edouard Pictet & Cie and its director from 1878. He founded the Geneva Chamber of Commerce in 1865, co-founded the Swiss Federation of Commerce and Industry in 1870 and presided over it from 1880 to 1882. He was a member of the National Council in 1887–1890 and in 1893.

== Biography ==
Ernest Pictet was a member of the Pictet family. He was the son of Jules Pictet and Adélaïde née de Candolle, the brother of Gustave Pictet, and a great-nephew of Augustin Pyramus de Candolle. He married Gabrielle Elisabeth Fuzier-Cayla, daughter of Horace, a lawyer.

In 1847–1848 Pictet studied sciences and letters in Geneva. He then did a banking apprenticeship in Liverpool, and from 1850 to 1855 he worked for a trading house there. In 1855 he became a partner in the bank Edouard Pictet & Cie in Geneva, and from 1878 he was its director (Ernest Pictet & Cie). He was a judge at the commercial court (tribunal de commerce) in 1864–1876 and 1880–1909. In 1865 he founded the Geneva Chamber of Commerce, and in 1870 he co-founded the Swiss Federation of Commerce and Industry, which he presided over from 1880 to 1882.

Pictet was a member of the municipal legislature (conseil municipal) of Geneva from 1858 to 1878 and of Le Petit-Saconnex from 1886 to 1902, where he was mayor from 1894. From 1878 to 1880 he sat in the Grand Council of Geneva as a Democrat (démocrate), and he presided over it in 1878–1879. He was a member of the National Council in 1887–1890 and in 1893.

== Bibliography ==
- E. Gruner, Die schweizerische Bundesversammlung 1848–1920, 1, 1966, 963–964
- J.-D. Candaux, Histoire de la famille Pictet, 1474–1974, 2, 1974, 483–492
- S. and S. Stelling-Michaud (eds.), Le Livre du Recteur de l'Académie de Genève (1559–1878), 5, 175
