= Corticiasca =

- Former municipality
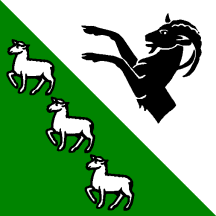
- Flag Coat of arms
- Location of Corticiasca
- Location within Switzerland Location within Canton of Ticino
- Coordinates: 46°5′N 9°1′E
- Country: Switzerland
- Canton: Ticino
- District: Lugano

Area
  - Total: 2.2 km^{2} (0.85 sq mi)
- Elevation: 1,067 m (3,501 ft)

Population (December 2004)
  - Total: 143
  - Density: 65/km^{2} (170/sq mi)
- Time zone: UTC+01:00 (CET)
  - Summer (DST): UTC+02:00 (CEST)
- Postal code: 6958
- SFOS number: 5177
- ISO 3166 code: CH-TI
- Surrounded by: Bidogno, Sonvico, Valcolla
- Website: SFSO statistics

Corticiasca was a municipality in the district of Lugano in the canton of Ticino in Switzerland.
