= Mallet family =

Family of bankers from France and Switzerland

Mallet
- French Huguenot noble banking family
- Origin: Rouen, Normandy
- Founder: Jaques Mallet (1530–1598)
- Titles: Barony de Chalmassy (1810; confirmed by Louis XVIII in 1815)
- Motto: Force d'en haut; En tout temps, en tout lieu, invoquer l'aide du bon Dieu. (Strength from above; Anytime, anywhere, invoke the help of God.)
- Estates: List: Château de Jouy-en-Josas; Château du Montcel; Château du Bois du Rocher; Château des Côtes; Château de Montéclin; Château Mallet-Vernes; Villa des Dunes; Maison Mallet
- Cadet branches: du Pan de Chalmassy
- Branches: List: French; Swiss (earlier Genevan); American

The Mallet family (French: [mɑlɛ]) is a family of French businessmen and bankers.

During the 16th century, the Mallet family first fled from Rouen to Geneva to escape mounting religious oppression by the state. In 1810, one branch was titled under the French Empire, followed by a lesser branch under Louis XVIII in 1816. Besides banking, fields in which members have excelled include science, the military, law, and politics.

== History ==
=== Etymology ===
According to the official genealogies from the Banque de France, the surname Mallet is likely derived from either the name of the city of Saint-Malo in Brittany or the parish of Saint-Maclou in Rouen, both namesakes of the 6th century Saint Malo of Aleth. This theory is one of several posed by modern lexicographers and onomasticians.

=== Origins ===
In the mid—late 16th century, religious civil war in France drove many Calvinist Huguenots, such as the Mallets, to seek refuge in Geneva, which had declared itself Lutheran in 1536. The earliest members of the Mallet family known to have escaped from Normandy were Jacques (1530–1598), from whom all future generations descend, and his brother, Esaïe. After the death of his first wife, Jacquemine Favre, Jacques married Laure Sartoris, daughter of Jean-Léonard, former secretary to Charles III, Duke of Savoy. The couple had eleven children. The descendants of Gabriel (1572–1651), the ninth child, include Jacques-André Mallet and the family of the Barons de Chalmassy. All other significant extant lines descend from Jacques (1575–1657), Gabriel's younger brother.

== Notable members ==
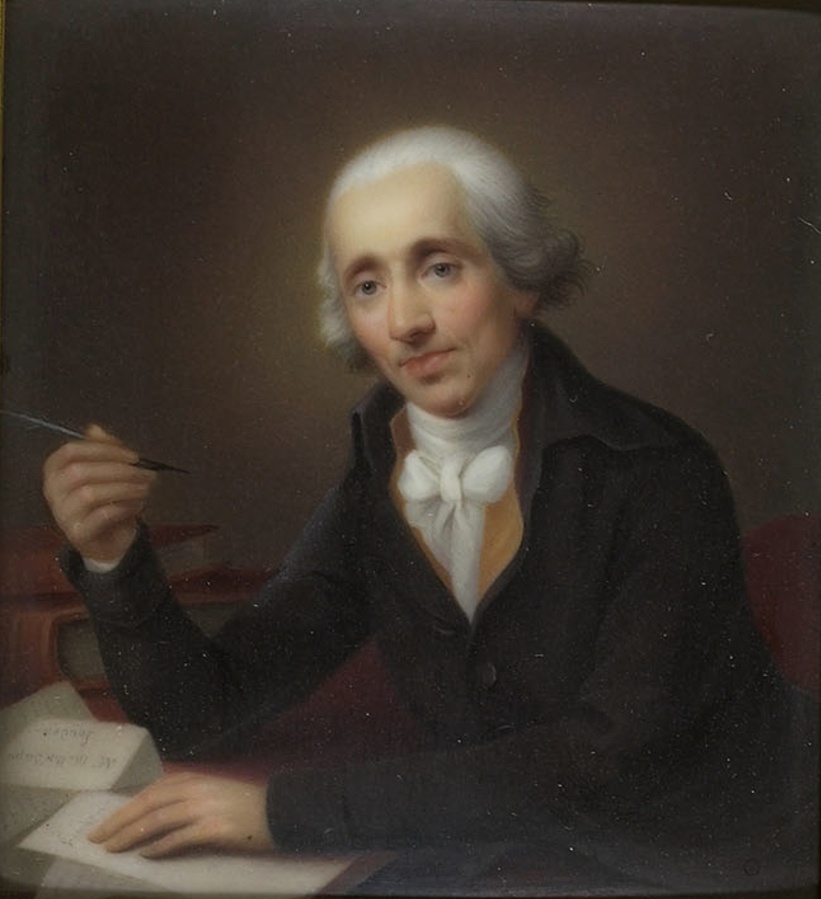
Jacques Mallet du Pan, based on a work by Rigaud.

=== Jacques Mallet du Pan ===
Jacques Mallet du Pan (1749–1800) was a journalist and political propagandist from Geneva.

In 1772, upon the recommendation of his colleague Voltaire, he accepted a professorship of French literature at Kassel. Due to severe political criticism of his writing, however, he soon left the continent for England in search of greater journalistic freedom. In 1789, he was recruited by Panckoucke as an editor of the Mercure de France in Paris. He resided in the city until 1792, when he was enlisted by Louis XVI, who saw du Pan as his political ally, as a special envoy charged with gathering military support from neighboring leaders. Du Pan participated in drafting precursors to the Brunswick Manifesto, and was forced into exile to Bern in 1797. He returned to England the following year, founded the Mercure britannique, and died of consumption in 1800.

Mallet du Pan followed a Calvinist philosophy, (c. 1700‒1930) and was known as a conservative counter-revolutionary. His work was largely neglected until after World War II, when it was rediscovered and championed by historians and philosophers such as Alessandro Passerin d'Entrèves and Jacques Godechot. It is accepted that du Pan originated the term suffrage universel (English: universal suffrage).

His grandson was the British civil servant Sir Louis Mallet. Through Louis and his brother, Charles (1824–1892), Jacques is the ancestor of many English civil servants and other public figures, including Louis du Pan Mallet, Charles Mallet the younger, Victor Mallet, and John and Richard Butler, Barons Dunboyne.

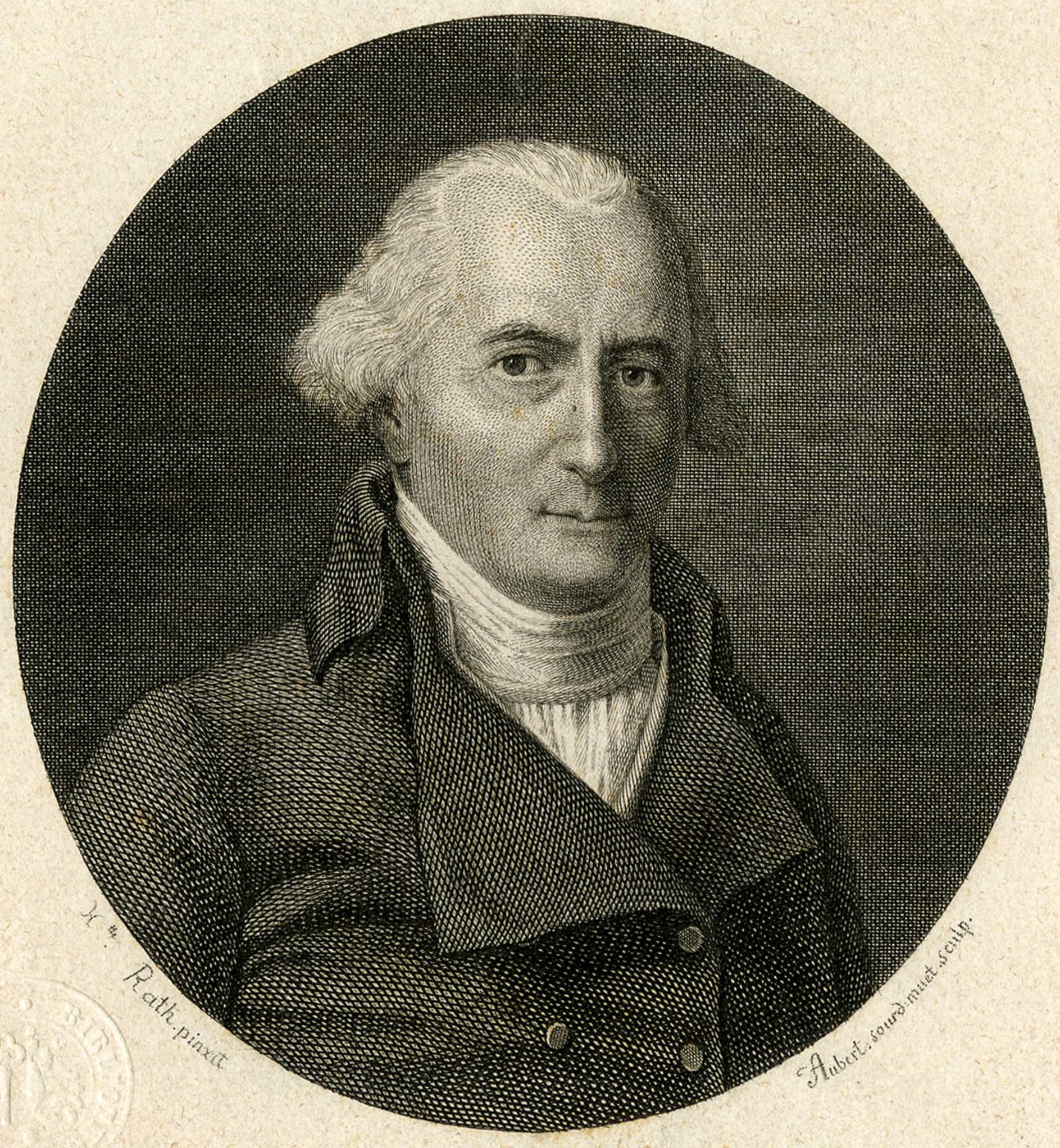
Engraving of Paul Henri Mallet (1730–1807) by Aubert, based on a work by Rath.

=== Paul Henri Mallet ===
Paul Henri Mallet (1730–1807) was a scholar and diplomat from Geneva. His nephew, Paul Henri Mallet Prevost (1756–1835), was the progenitor of the American Mallet-Prevost branch.

In 1752, he replaced La Beaumelle as professor of French belles-lettres at the Academy of Copenhagen. He became interested in ancient Denmark and other Northern lands and published several volumes on Danish history with the help of the government. In 1755, perhaps due to Mallet's works having been vocally supportive of monarchical absolutism, queen consort Louisa of Denmark employed Mallet as the tutor of literature and French language for her son, Christian, the future king of Denmark and Norway. Mallet's writings on mythology and religion, translated by Bishop Percy, also inspired the poet William Blake, among others.

After he had completed his duties in Denmark, Mallet journeyed to England to visit the royal family, which included Caroline Matilda, the betrothed of his former pupil, Christian. Mallet became the princess' epistolary literary advisor when she left for Denmark. In 1760, Mallet returned to Geneva, where he was offered a professorship as chair of the department of history and, four years later, a position on the Council of Two Hundred. Despite his apparent success as an educator, Mallet refused empress Catherine's offer to tutor her young son, Paul I. Instead, he chose to accompany Lord Mount Stuart on a Grand Tour through Europe.

While in England, Mallet received a commission to create a history for the House of Hanover. This work, along with another from Frederick II for the House of Hesse, was completed in 1785. However, over the next few years, the wealth Mallet had accumulated, including his pensions from the nobility, was essentially dissolved due to ongoing political turmoil. When the occupying French government found out about his poor financial state, however, Mallet was supplied with a generous allowance, which he took advantage of for a brief period until his death in 1807 from an acute attack of paralysis. A volume of Mallet's first biography, by Sismondi, was published in the same year.

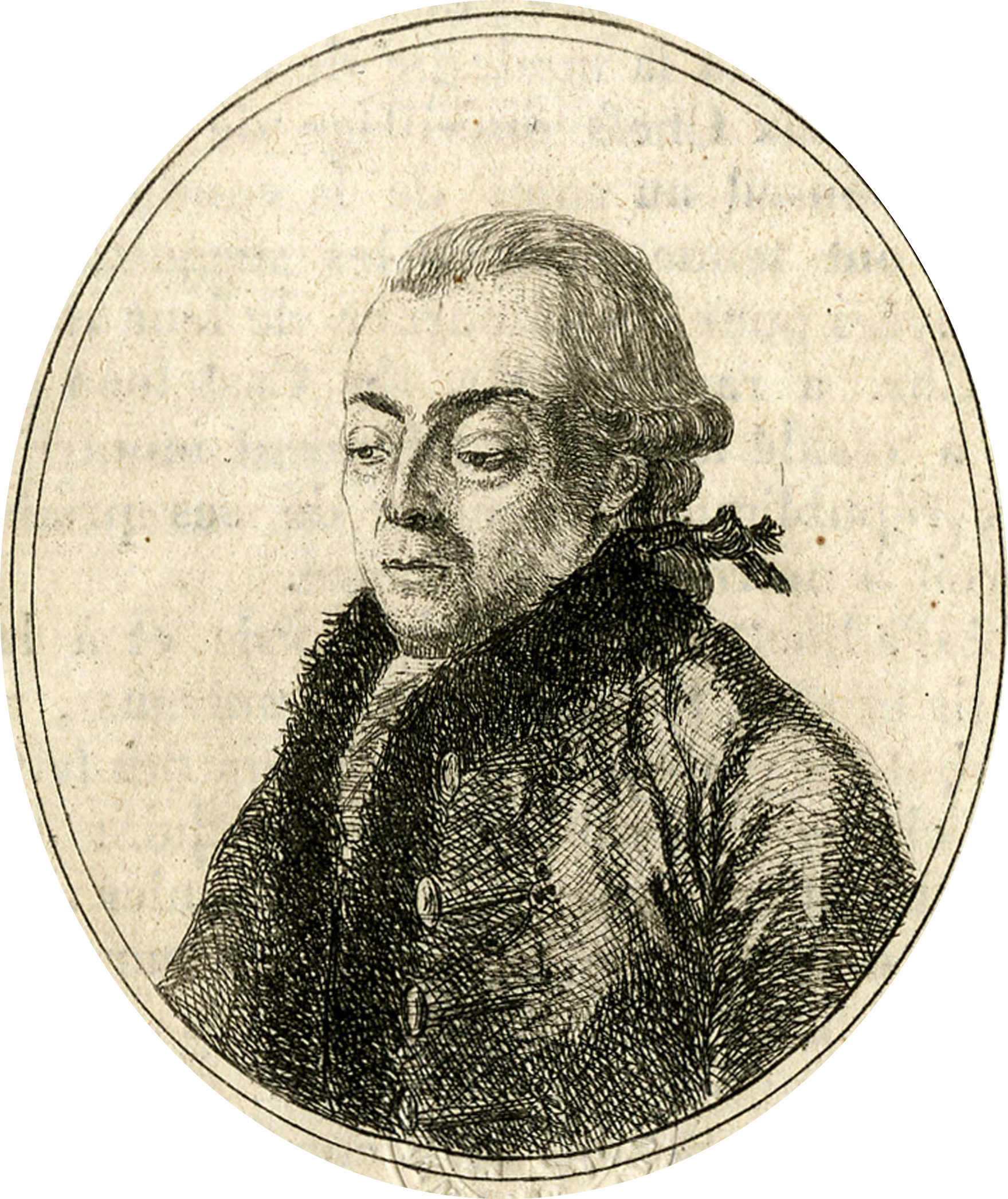
Engraving of Jacques-André by Jean-Alexandre Grand (c.1759–1820)

=== Jacques-André Mallet ===
Jacques-André Mallet (1740–1790) was a mathematician and astronomer from Geneva. He is best known for founding the first observatory in Geneva.

He was expected to follow the career of his father, who had been a soldier. However, an accident in Jacques-André's youth caused damage to his legs, and he shifted his fascination to academia. In 1755, he began his education at the Academy of Geneva, studying first with mathematician Louis Necker. His pursuit of knowledge brought him next to Basel in 1760, where he studied with Daniel Bernoulli, and in 1765 to England and France, where he was inspired by astronomers Jérôme Lalande, John Bevis, and Nevil Maskelyne, among others. Mallet was subsequently invited by Catherine II and the Saint Petersburg Academy of Sciences to travel to Russia to observe the 1769 transit of Venus from Lapland. Due to an overcast sky that obscured his view, Mallet's observations in Lapland provided the scientific community with little useful data. Nonetheless, he was awarded honorary membership in the Saint Petersburg Academy of Sciences.

Upon his return to Geneva, Jacques-André was granted a position within the Council of Two Hundred and an honorary professorship at his alma mater, the Academy of Geneva. In 1772, he successfully petitioned the council for approval to build an observatory in Geneva, the first in the canton. The observatory's structure and technology were state-of-the-art. As director of the observatory, Jacques-André and his students, which included Marc-Auguste Pictet and Jean Trembley, conducted research concerning planetary movements, solar eclipses, and other celestial phenomena. As Jacques-André grew ill in subsequent years, he continued his research at the Mallet family chateau in Avully.

His sister married the astronomer Jean-Louis Pictet, who had joined Mallet on his journey to Russia. Pictet's son, Jean-Pierre, was the father of François Jules Pictet, whose own son would marry back into the Mallet family in 1863. Jacques-André died in 1790 without issue.

== Barons de Chalmassy ==
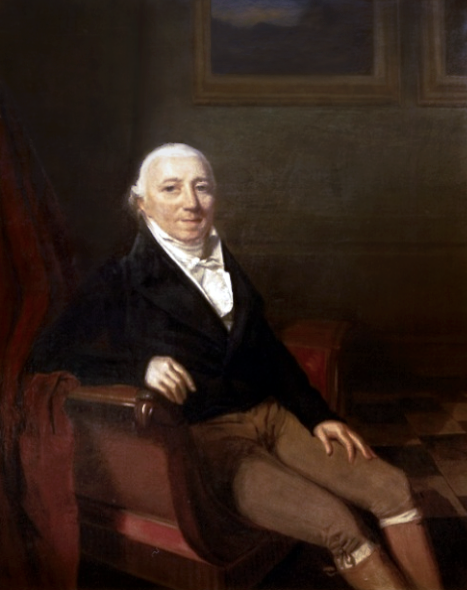
Guillaume, 1st Baron Mallet de Chalmassy, by Firmin Massot

The arms of the Barons de Chalmassy

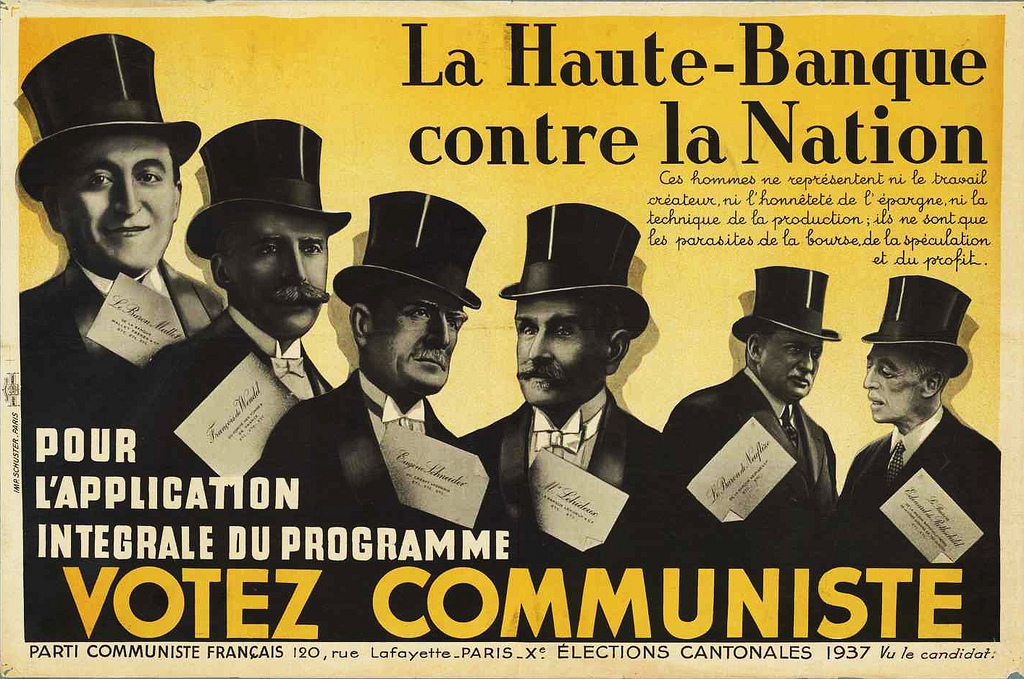
A poster for the PCF, 1937. Arthur, 5th Baron Mallet de Chalmassy (far left) and his colleagues are criticized as parasites of the stock market.

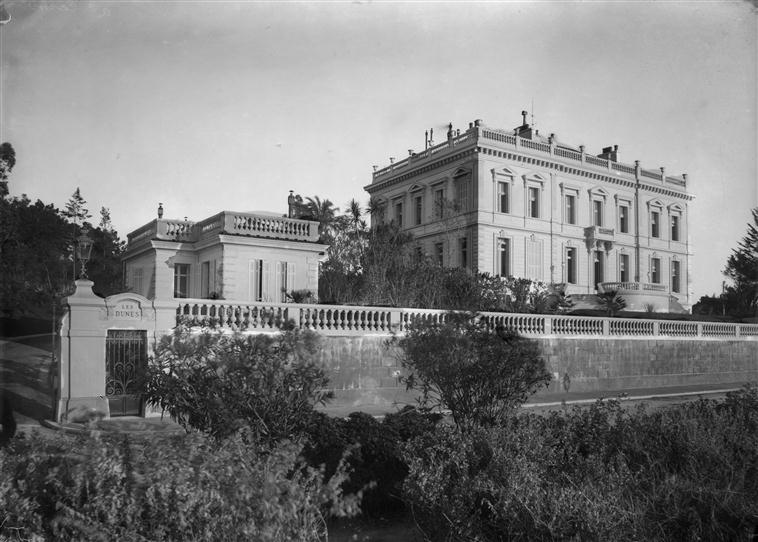
Villa des Dunes. Photograph by Gustave William Lemaire, bet. 1900–1920.

- Isaac Mallet (1684–1779) was first employed by Gédéon Mallet, Cramer et Cie, a Genevan bank founded by Isaac's second cousin Gédéon Mallet. While on business in Paris, Isaac established his own financial enterprise, Isaac Mallet et Cie., 1713. Notably, the bank was charged with managing the capital of Chancellor Maupeou, a descendant of whom married Isaac's fourth-great-grandson, Arthur, 5th Baron de Chalmassy. Isaac was a member of the Grand Council of Geneva.
  ∞ 1722 Françoise Dufour. They had six children, including:
  - Jacques Mallet (1724–1815), who was a partner of his father's bank, which assumed the name Dufour, Mallet and Le Royer. Like his father, he was a member of the Grand Council.
    ∞ 1744 Louise Madeleine Bresson. They had six children, including:
    - Guillaume Mallet, 1st Baron Mallet de Chalmassy (1747–1826). Increasingly upset with the violent conditions of the French Revolution, he and several other bankers, including Claude Perier and Jean-Conrad Hottinguer, helped to install Napoleon on the French throne. In 1810, Emperor Napoleon awarded Guillaume a knighthood and ennobled him as Baron de Chalmassy. Furthermore, Guillaume and his colleagues were given complete control over the newly established Bank of France, on whose Council of Regents Guillaume was engaged from 1800 until his death. Guillaume's title was subsequently confirmed by Louis XVIII during the Restoration.
      ∞ 1779 Elisabeth Boy de La Tour († 1781), whose wealthy widowed mother, Julie, had assisted a young, displaced Rousseau in managing his financial affairs. Elisabeth's sister, Madeleine-Catherine, married Étienne Delessert and bore Benjamin Delessert, both of whom were successful bankers.
      ∞ Anne-Julie Houel (1761-1849), whose sister, Marthe-Henriette, was married to Guillaume's younger brother, Isaac Jean-Jacques, also a banker.
      - Adolphe-Jacques "James", 2nd Baron Mallet de Chalmassy (1787–1868). He was awarded a knighthood for his outstanding conduct in the defense of Paris at Barrière de Clichy in 1814. Under his leadership, the Mallet Bank acquired Passage Choiseul for the construction of the Opéra-Comique's theatre, Salle Ventadour. Adolphe-Jacques assumed his late father's seat on the Council of Regents, and served as valet de chambre for kings Louis XVIII and Charles X.
        ∞ 1818 Laure Oberkampf, daughter of industrialist Christophe-Philippe Oberkampf. Her sister, Émilie, was married to James' brother, Louis Jules.
        - Alphonse, 3rd Baron Mallet de Chalmassy (1819–1906), a banker. Alphonse assumed his late father's seat on the Council of Regents.
          ∞ 1873 Hélène Bartholdi (1825–1896), second cousin of the sculptor Frédéric-Auguste Bartholdi, designer of the Statue of Liberty.
          - Jacques-Frédéric-Albert, 4th Baron Mallet de Chalmassy (1846–1927)
            ∞ 1873 Jeanne Zélie Poupart de Neuflize (1851–1935), sister of the banker and equestrian, Jean de Neuflize. They had no issue.
        - Arthur Mallet (1821–1847)
          - Théodore Mallet (1860–1882)
            - Arthur Auguste Jacques, 5th Baron Mallet de Chalmassy (1884–1948)
              ∞ 1914 Jacqueline Marie Aimé Diane de Maupeou (1825–1896), a direct descendant of René de Maupeou, Chancellor of France. They had two children, including:
              - Jean-Pierre Théodore Mallet, 6th Baron de Chalmassy (1915–2003)
                ∞ 1939 Christine de Watteville de Berckheim, great-granddaughter of the French general Sigismond Guillaume de Berckheim, and 2x-great-granddaughter of the Swiss-French banker and art collector James-Alexandre de Pourtalès. They had three children, including:
                - Etienne Mallet (b. 1941), who is the president of the film and performing arts company Cinéfrance. He is also the president of the Mallet Foundation, an organization that assists people with disabilities. Etienne served in the Ministère de l'Equipement and Ministère de l'Intérieur, as well as on several boards, including that of his family bank Neuflize OBC.
                - Jacques Robert Mallet (1945–2001), an investment banker and president of the art dealer Mallet Fine Art Ltd. He had two children with his first wife, Laurie.
          - Ernest Mallet (1863-1956), a regent of the Bank of France. In 1915, as a member of the Anglo-French Financial Commission, he and his colleagues successfully appealed to the United States for a $500 million loan for France and England. Ernest assumed his late uncle Alphonse's seat on the Council of Regents until the council was abolished in 1936.
            ∞ 1905 Hon. Mabel Georgina St. Aubyn (1872–1944). She was the daughter of John St Aubyn, 1st Baron St Levan and Lady Elizabeth Clementina, daughter of John Townshend, 4th Marquess Townshend. They had three children, including:
            - Micheline (1907–2001) ∞ Lucien Boël (1903–1999), son of Baron Pol Clovis Boël.
            - Véronique (1909–2009)
              ∞ 1937 Ivan d'Eliassy, the Hungarian ambassador in Madrid. They had three children, including:
              - Melinda d'Eliassy (1942–2004), who worked as a representative for Chanel in Spain.
                ∞ 1964 Pál Sarkozy, the father of Nicolas Sarkozy, former President of France from 2007 to 2012.
                ∞ 1990 Luis Ruspoli, 7th Marquis of Boadilla del Monte, second son of the 4th Duke of Alcudia and Sueca.
                ∞ 1968 Alfonso Calparsoro. They had one daughter, Ilona (b. 1969), an entrepreneur.
        - Henriette Clémentine Mallet (1829–1853) ∞ Alfred von Lotzback (1819–1874), a Bavarian industrialist and elite. They had one daughter, Laura.
      - Louis Jules Mallet (1789–1866).
        ∞ 1813 Émilie Laure Oberkampf (1794–1856), daughter of industrialist Christophe-Philippe Oberkampf. Her sister, Laure, was married to Louis-Jules' brother, James. They had four children, including:
        - Nathalie Mallet (1813–1884)
          ∞ 1839 Pierre-Antoine Labouchère, the French historical painter.
        - Charles Mallet (1815–1902), who worked for the Mallet family bank. He was close colleagues with the Pereire brothers and was one of the directors of their bank, Crédit Mobilier. He co-founded two additional banking institutions—the Imperial Ottoman Bank and Crédit Agricole—and served in leadership positions in both. In 1868, when Charles was president of the PLM railway company, he commissioned a home in Cannes from the architect Charles Baron. Before Villa des Dunes' demolition in 1933, it hosted many notable guests, including Alexander II and empress consort Maria, Charles I of Württemberg, and the novelist Paul Bourget.
        - Henri Mallet (1824–1908), a banker.
          ∞ Gabrielle Louise Mathilde André, sister of Alfred André (1827–1893), a regent of the Bank of France. They had issue.
    - Isaac Jean-Jacques Mallet (1763–1815), a banker. He was imprisoned during the French Revolution, eventually having his citizenship restored in 1791.
      ∞ 1792 Marthe Henriette Houel, the younger sister of Guillaume's wife, Anne-Julie. They had issue.

== Other branches ==
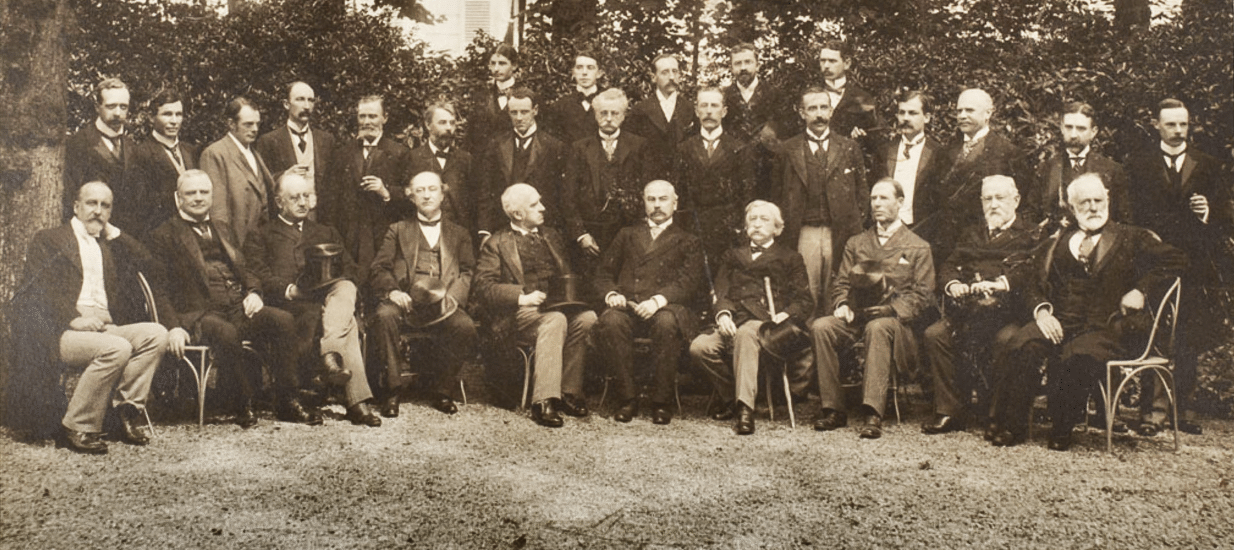
The Arbitral Tribunal and Counsel, Paris 1899. Severo Mallet-Prevost is in the back row, second from the right. Photograph by Eugène Pirou.

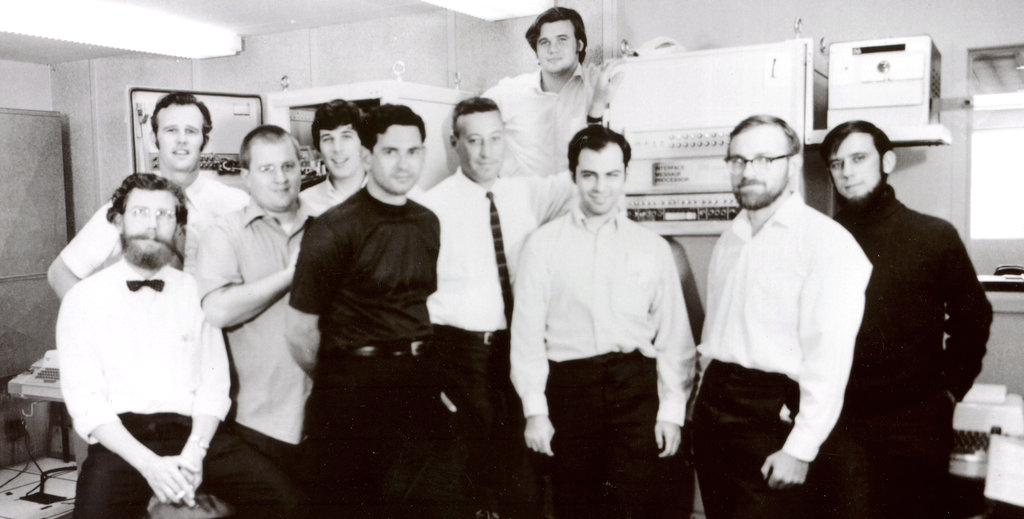
Severo Ornstein (far right) as hardware lead on the design team for the first IMP, 1969

=== Mallet-Prevost ===
Coat of Arms of Paul Henry Mallet-Prevost

- Paul Henri Mallet-Prevost (1756–1835) was the son of Genevan councilman Henri Mallet and Jeanne Gabrille Prévost, sister of Major General Augustine. Paul Henri's parents had assumed the surname Mallet-Prevost following their marriage in 1753. After serving in the army of Louis XVI, Paul Henri fled to the United States as a fugitive from the French Revolution. In 1794, he settled in New Jersey with other French-speaking people, and the area around his holding quickly gained the moniker of "Frenchtown".
  - Andrew (André) Mallet-Provost (1780–1850) lived in Philadelphia and served as Brigadier General of Volunteers in the War of 1812.
    - Charles (1818–1887) held positions in the US military and government, including U.S. Marshal for the Wisconsin Territory and Assistant Adjutant General under Patterson.
      - Sutherland (1845–1905) was a civil engineer and the third vice president of the Pennsylvania Railroad Company. Early in his career, he was involved in the creation of lines for not only the Pennsylvania Railroad, but also the Northern Central, Erie, and Baltimore and Potomac railroads, among many others. In 1889, he was elected president of the Baltimore, Chesapeake and Atlantic Railway, successfully leading the logistics operation for aid and materials during the Johnstown Flood.
    - Grayson (1823–1896) was a surgeon in the U.S. Army, serving under General Wool during the Mexican–American War. After the war, he settled in the Mexican city of Zacatecas, marrying the daughter of the state's future governor, Severo Cosio. Grayson Mallet-Prevost also established the first Protestant church in Mexico.
      - Anita (1852–1944). With her husband, Howard Murphy, she had six children, including:
        - Grayson Mallet-Prevost Murphy Sr. (1878–1937), an American military officer, banker, and businessman. Murphy served as a volunteer in the Spanish–American War and, ultimately, as a lieutenant colonel in the Army, earning a Distinguished Service Medal in 1918. After his time in the military, Murphy pursued a career in business, notably working with J. P. Morgan on several ventures, such as the short-lived Foreign Commerce Corporation of America, of which Murphy was president from 1920 to 1921.
      - Severo Mallet-Prevost (1860–1949) was an attorney. In 1896, he was appointed by President Grover Cleveland as the Secretary of the Commission to report on the boundary line between Venezuela and British Guiana, later joining the defense of Venezuela during the arbitration to settle the Guyana–Venezuela territorial dispute, which provoked the border crisis. The remaining members of Venezuela's senior defense numbered one Venezuelan (José María, Marquis de Rojas) and three Americans (former president Benjamin Harrison, former Secretary of the Navy Benjamin F. Tracy, and former Assistant Secretary of the Navy James R. Soley). In 1899, the same year as the Venezuelan arbitration, Severo joined a New York City law firm that had had as one of its first partners William Curtis Noyes. In 1925, the firm adopted its current name of Curtis, Mallet-Prevost, Colt & Mosle, and has since expanded globally.
        ∞ 1887 Virginia Hopkins Johns (1859–1930)
        - Pauline Cosio Mallet-Prevost (1892–1985), a pianist. With her husband, she founded the Ornstein School of Music, which counted John Coltrane and Jimmy Smith among its students.
          ∞ 1918 Leo Ornstein, a pianist, pedagogue, and avant garde classical composer. They had two children, including:
          - Severo Ornstein (born 1930), a former computer scientist. He was a programmer for major projects including the SAGE, TX-2, and LINC computers, as well as the first IMP. As an employee of Xerox PARC, he contributed to the laser printer, the Dorado computer, and the notation software Mockingbird. In 1980, he helped to establish the CPSR, an organization concerned with addressing nuclear threat and accountable computer use.

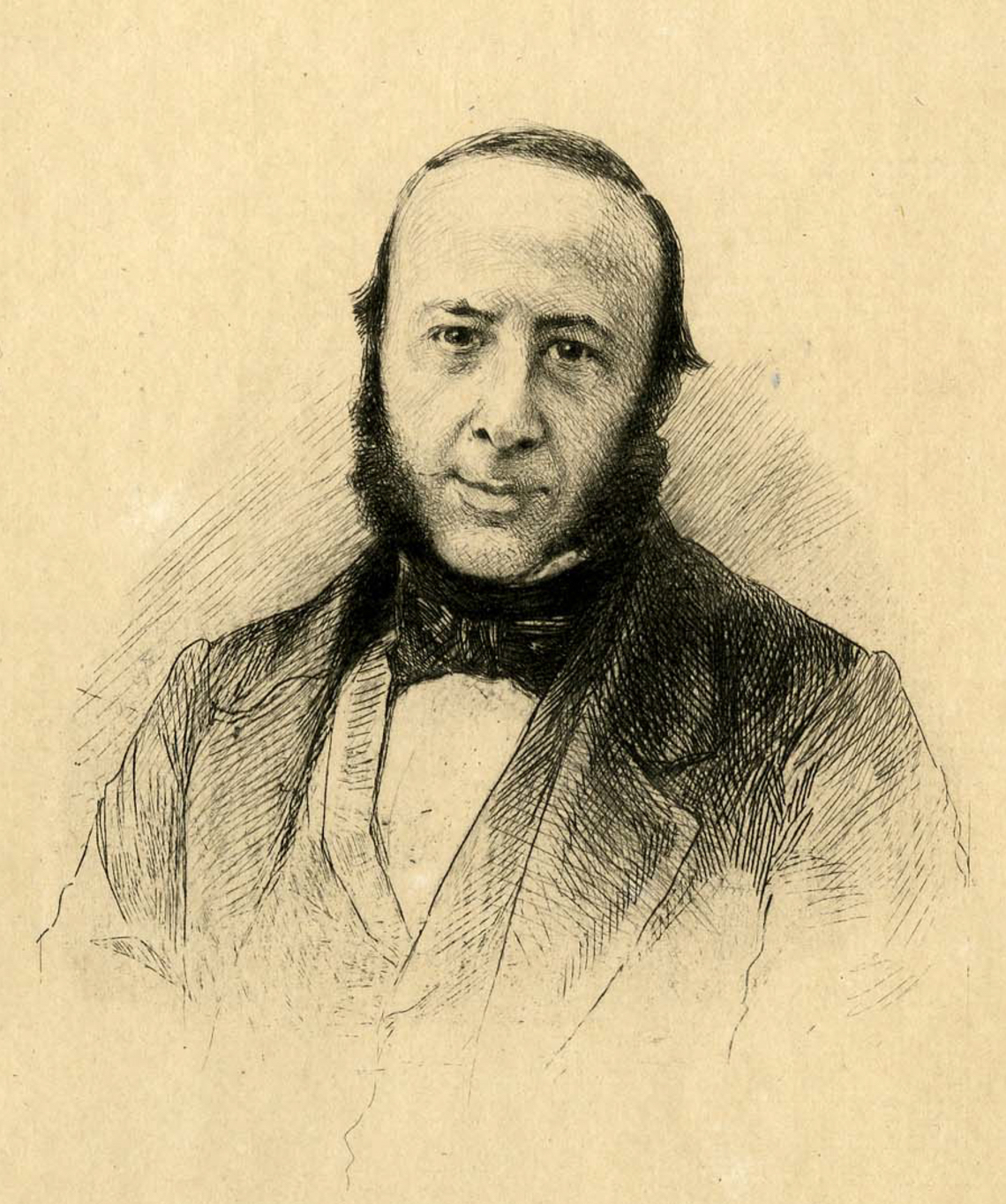
Edouard Félix Mallet, purportedly engraved by Rodolphe Piguet.

=== Mallet-Butini ===
- Jean Mallet (1716-1789)
  ∞ 1756 Marie Charlotte Butini
  - Jean-Louis Mallet-Butini (1757–1832). They had five children, including:
    - Edouard Félix Mallet (1805–1856), a judge and historian who helped found the Société d'histoire et d'archéologie de Genève, serving as its president in 1842, 1844, and 1849.
      ∞ 1840 Marie Plantamour, sister of the scientists Philippe and Emile Plantamour (who was a director of the Geneva Observatory after Jacques-André Mallet). They had three children, including:
      - Emilie Louise Mallet (1844–1897)
        ∞ 1863 Albert Edouard Pictet (1835–1879), deputy of the Grand Council of Geneva and son of the zoologist and palaeontologist François Jules Pictet de la Rive. They had three children, including:
        - Jules Camille Pictet (1864–1893)
          ∞ 1891 Marie Mathilde Diodati (1835–1879), a direct descendant of Giovanni Diodati. They had no issue.
      - Lydie Marie Mallet (1848–1900)
        ∞ 1869 Jean-Louis Prevost, a neurologist and physiologist, whose distant ancestors are shared by the Mallet-Prevost family .
  - François Mallet-Butini, 1st Baron de Mallet (1765–1839), a.k.a. Mallet de Crécy, was created a baron by Louis XVIII.
    ∞ 1807 Anne Molesworth, daughter of Robert Molesworth, 5th Viscount Molesworth. The couple had three children, including:
    - Molesworth, 2nd Baron de Mallet (1808–1866).
      ∞ 1840 Mary Indiana Sykes. They had three children, including:
      - Anna Eliza de Mallet (1841–1899)
        ∞ Augustus Charles Myrton Cunynghame (1829–1904), the general director for the GPO in Edinburgh, and the son of Sir David, 5th Baronet Cunynghame. They had three children, including:
        - Francis James de Mallet Cunynghame (1884–1958), major in the 7th (City of London) Battalion, London Regiment.
    - Charles Philippe, 3rd Baron de Mallet (1812–1885)
      ∞ Elisabeth Melcafe. They had two children, including:
      - François, 4th Baron de Mallet (1845–1930). Died without male issue.

== Gallery ==
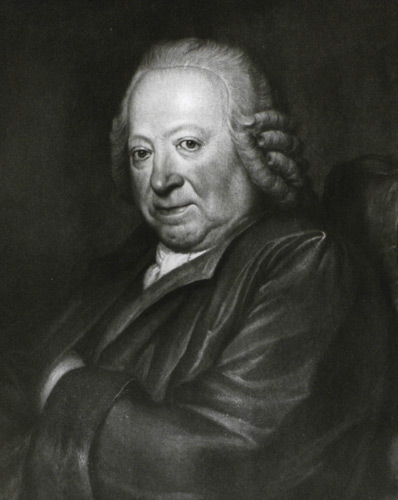
Isaac Mallet (1684–1779)
by Preudhomme

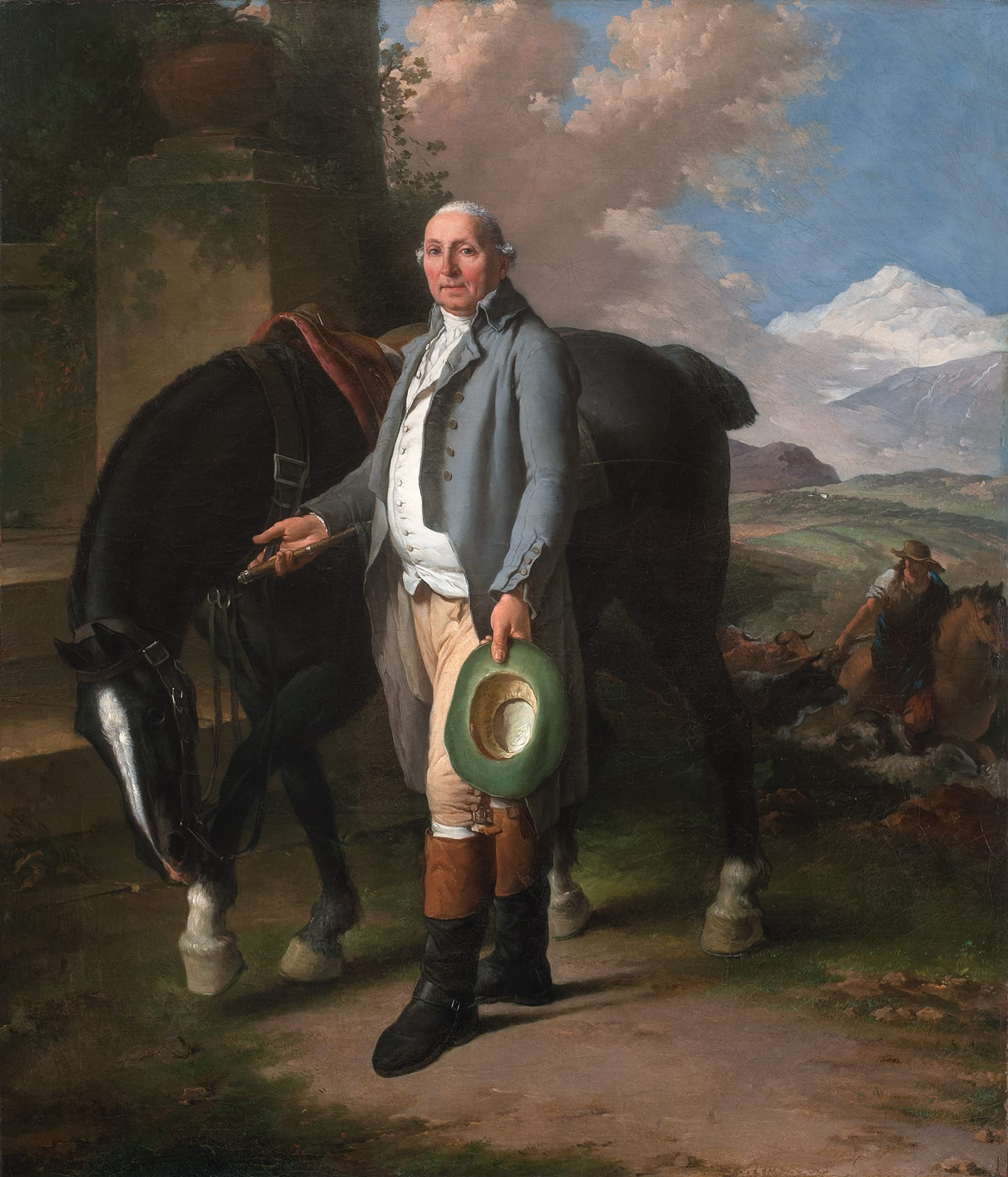
Jacques Mallet (1724–1815)
by Saint-Ours

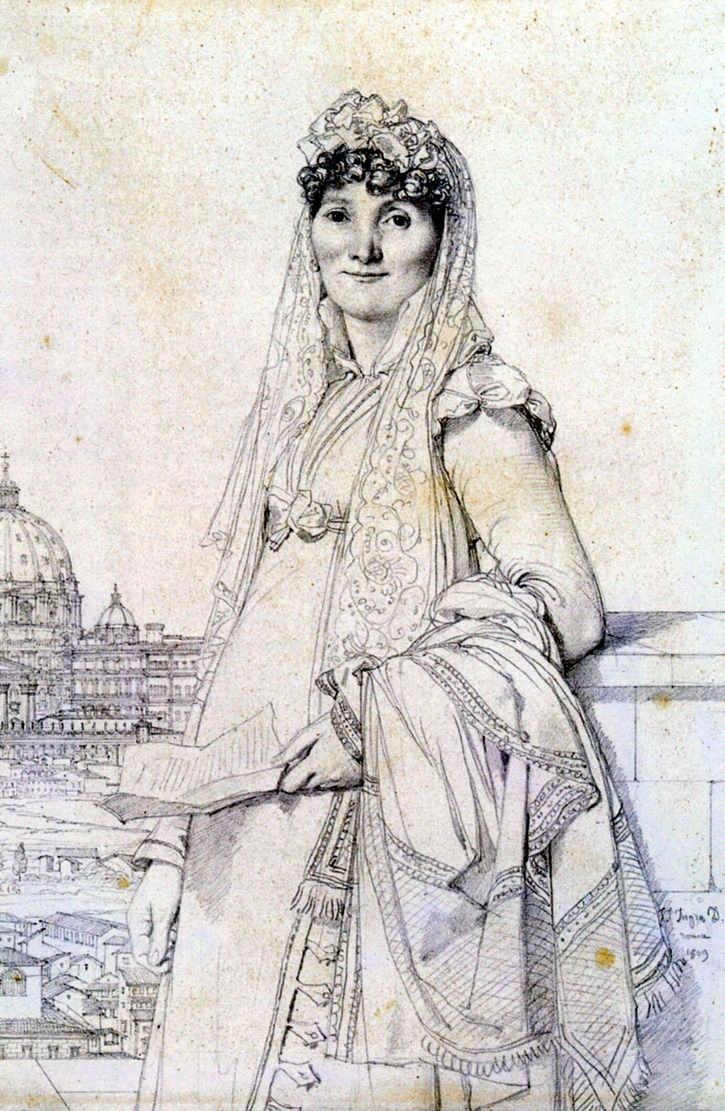
Anne-Julie Houel (1761–1849)
wife of Guillaume,
by Ingres, 1809

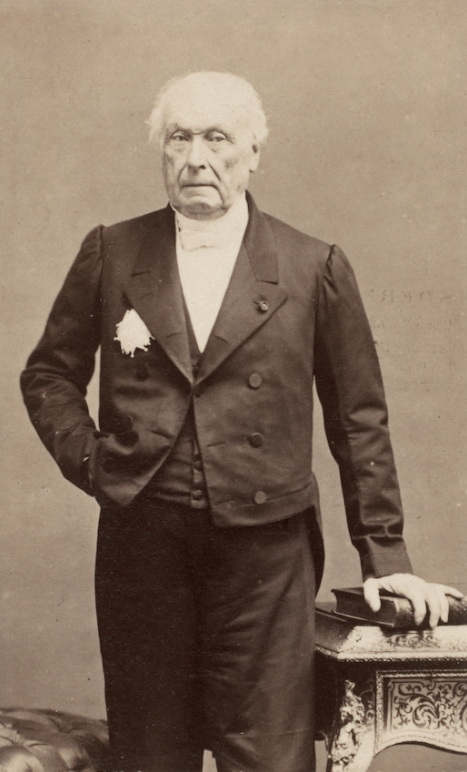
James, 2nd Baron Mallet de Chalmassy (1787–1868)
by Disdéri, 1864

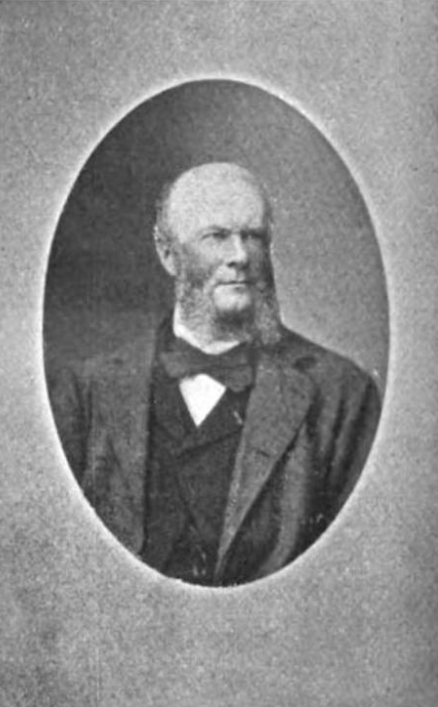
Alphonse, 3rd Baron Mallet de Chalmassy (1819–1906)

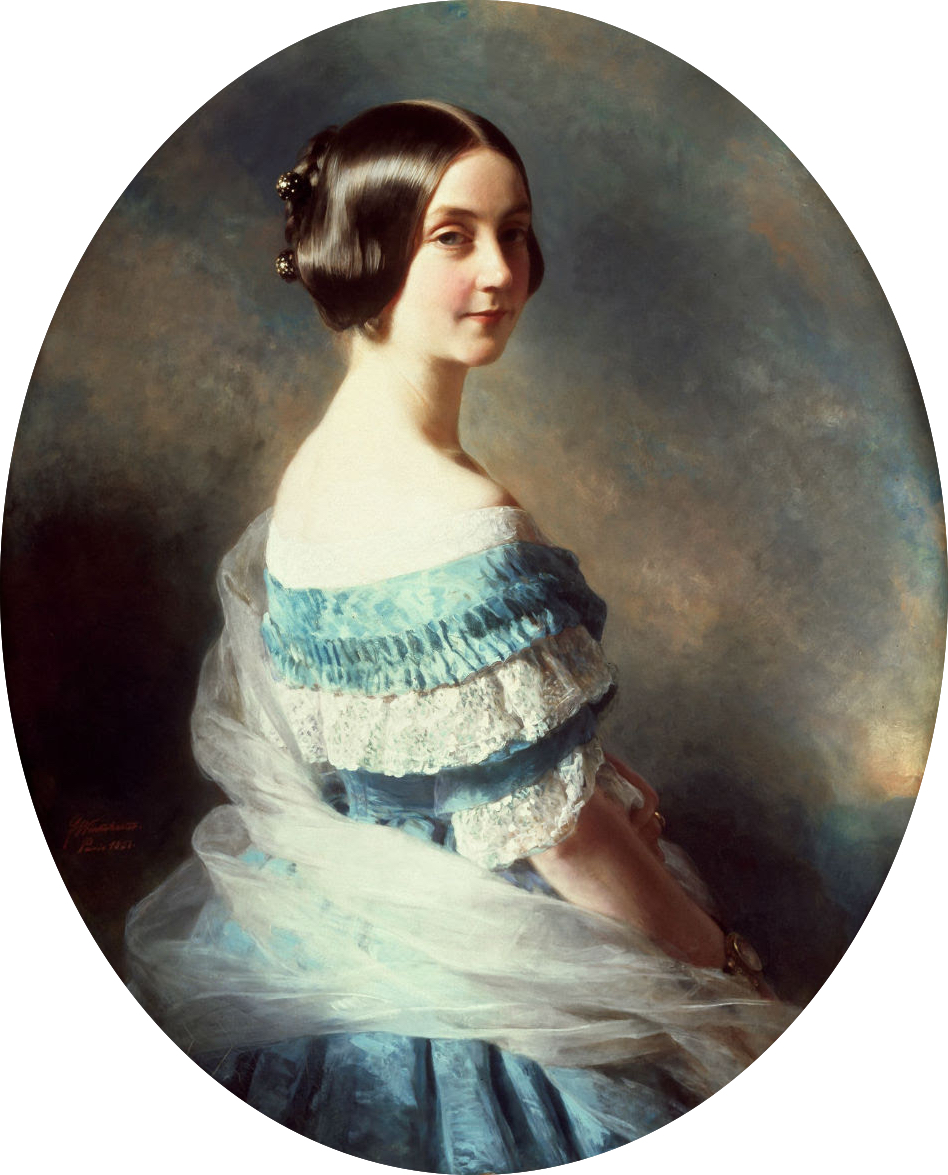
Baroness Hélène Mallet de Chalmassy née Bartholdy,
wife of Alphonse,
by Winterhalter, 1851

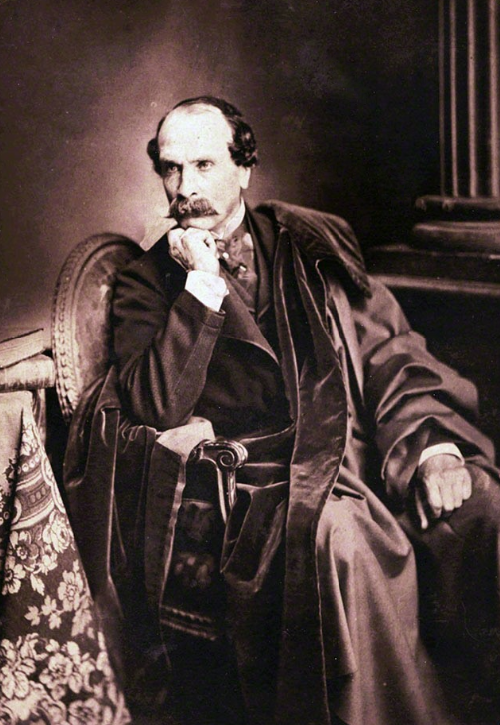
Ernest Mallet (1863–1956)
by Adam-Salomon, 1850s

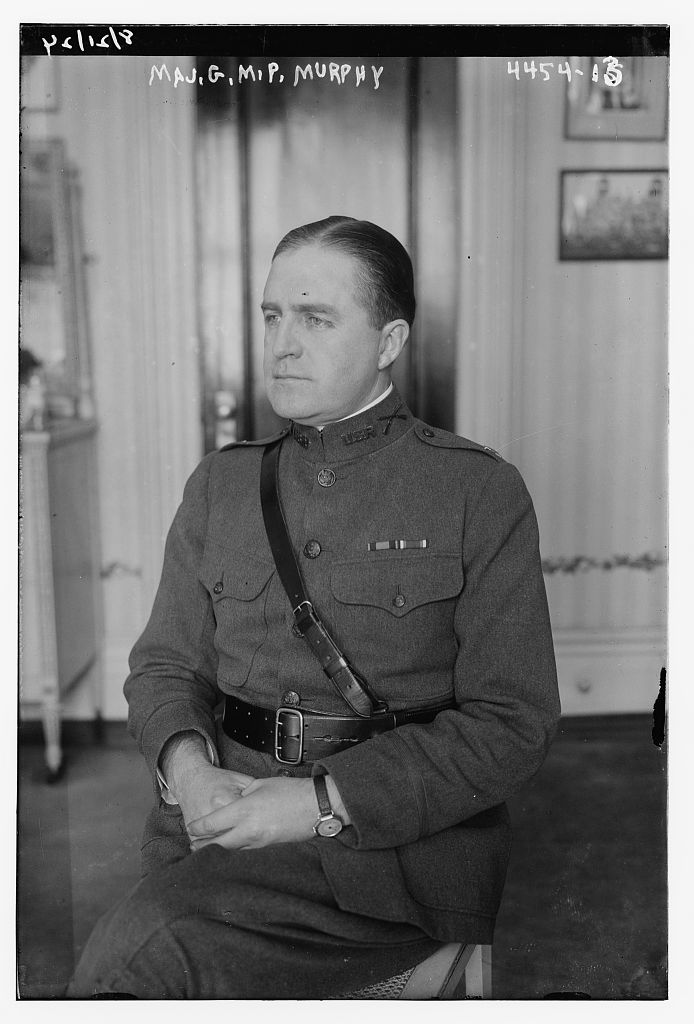
Grayson M. P. Murphy,
by Bain, 1917

== Sources ==
- Baranton, Pascal; Blick, Françoise. "Mallet". Section Généalogique de l'Association Artistique de la Banque de France. Banque de France.
- Schweizerisches Geschlechterbuch [Swiss Genealogical Almanac] (in German). Vol. 4. Basel: C. F. Lendorff. 1913. p. 341.
- Révérend, Vicomte Albert (1905). Titres, anoblissements et pairies de la restauration 1814–1830 [Titles, ennoblements and peerages of the restoration 1814–1830] (in French). Vol. 5. Honoré Champion; Albert Révérend. pp. 32–35.
- Burke, Arthur Meredyth (1908). The Prominent Families of the United States of America. Vol. 1. London: The Sackville Press Ltd. pp. 180–182.
