= Albertine Necker de Saussure =

Genevan/Swiss writer and educationalist (1766–1841)

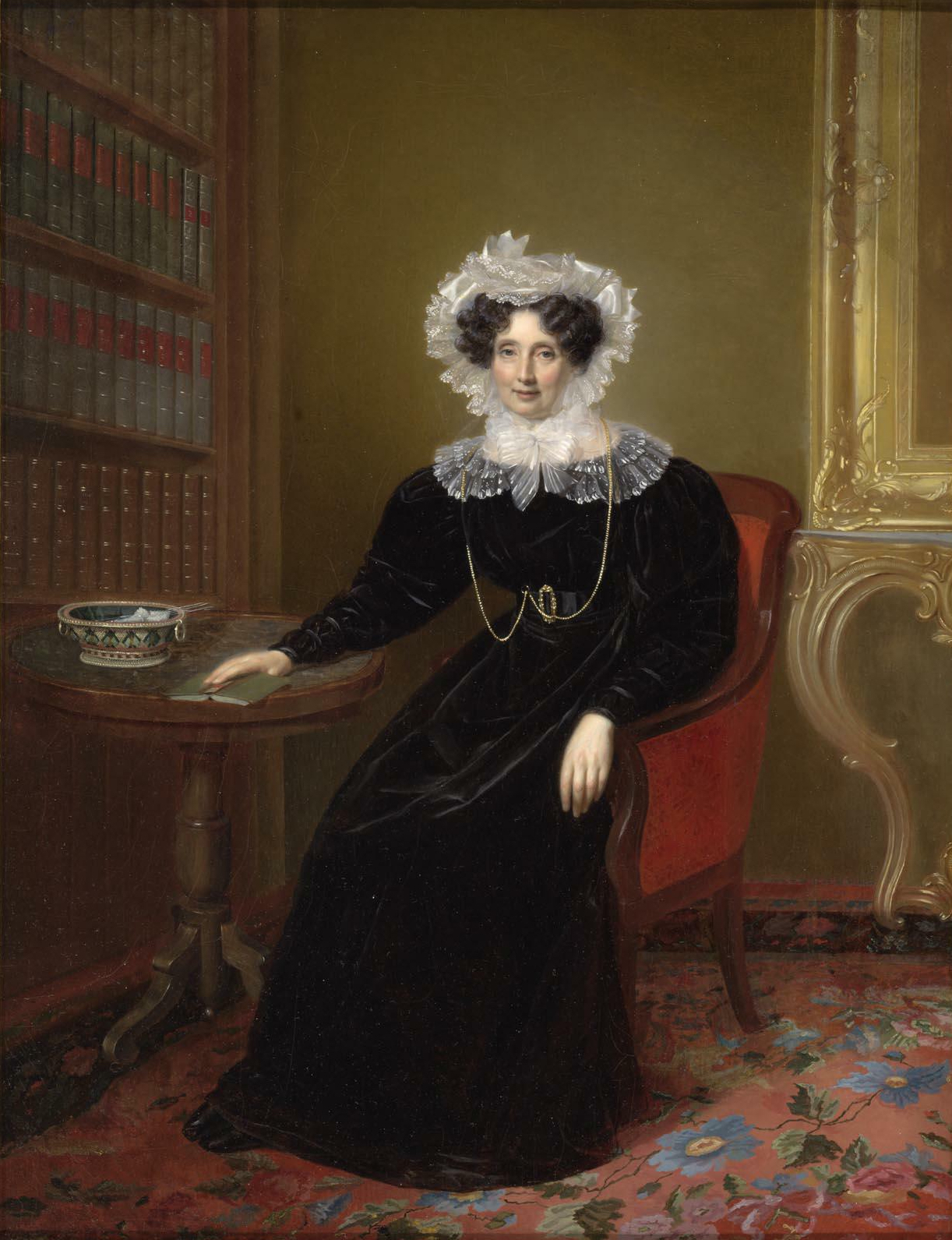
Albertine Necker de Saussure, circa 1830

Albertine Adrienne Necker de Saussure (9 April 1766, in Geneva – 13 April 1841, in Mornex, on the Salève, near Geneva) was a Genevan and then Swiss writer and educationalist, and an early advocate of education for women.

== Life ==
Albertine Necker de Saussure was the daughter of the Genevan scientist Horace-Bénédict de Saussure (1740-1799), a noted physicist, geologist, meteorologist, and Alpine explorer, and Albertine-Amélie Boissier (1745-1817). Horace-Bénédict, believing that the schools of the day were inferior, taught his three children at home. She learned English, German, Italian, and Latin, and her father also trained her in science. Albertine "inherited a large share of her father's intellectual energy as well as of his enthusiasm for educational reform." She supported her father's schooling in her later writings. Although a Calvinist, her religious views were broadminded and tolerant.

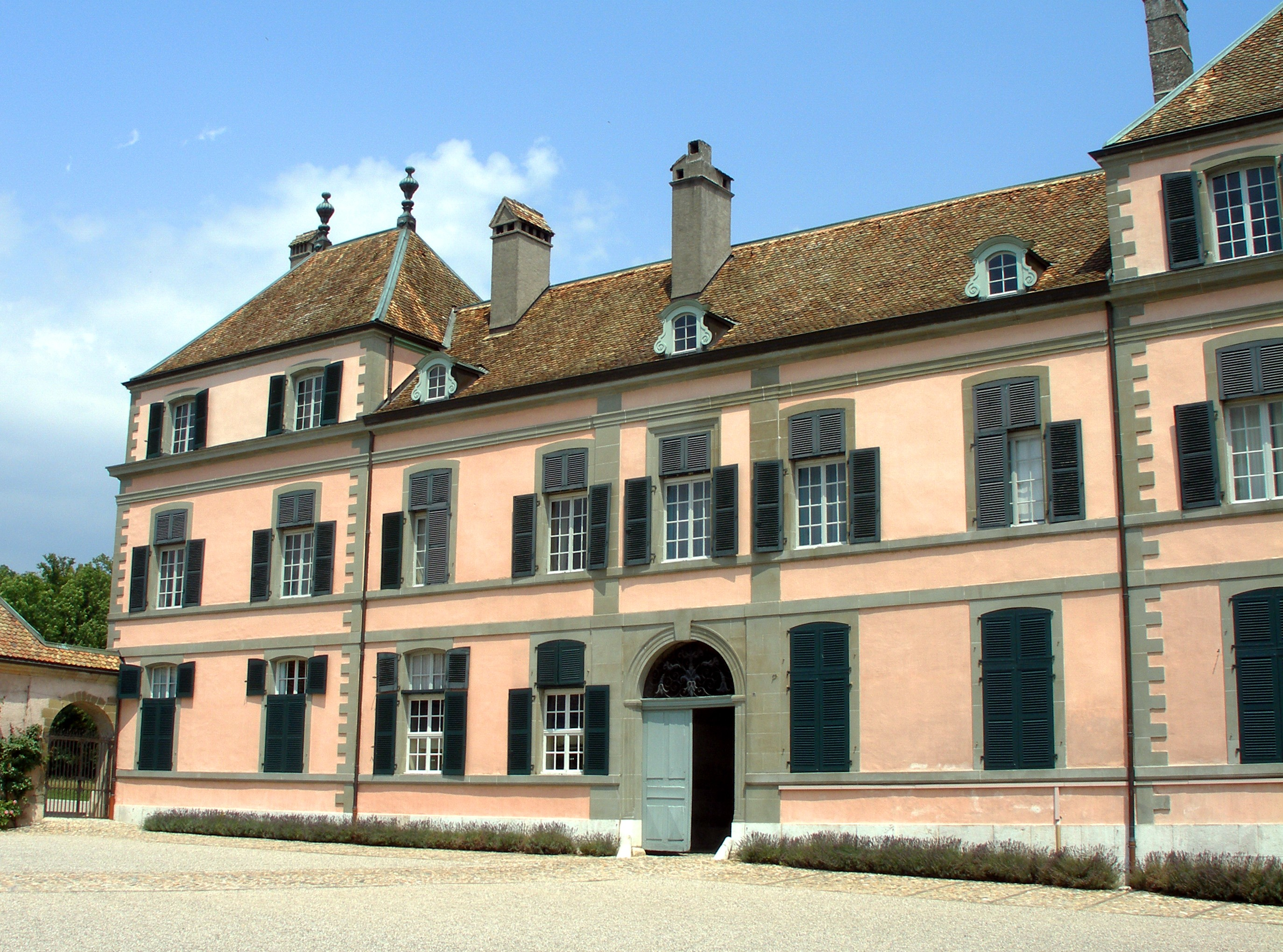
Château de Coppet

In 1785, at age 19, Albertine married Jacques Necker (1757-1825), a captain in the French cavalry. He was the son of Louis Necker and the nephew and namesake of Louis XVI's finance minister, Jacques Necker. The French Revolution ended Necker's military career and, in 1790, he began teaching as a demonstrator in botany at the University of Geneva, a job he obtained because of his wife's surname. She initially wrote her husband's botany lectures for him, but he eventually rose to Professor of Botany at the university. She educated her own children in a wide range of subjects, including science. They lived in Cologny, Switzerland and she became a close friend of her husband's cousin, the prominent writer and intellectual Germaine de Staël.

Albertine's brother Nicolas-Théodore de Saussure became a noted chemist and a pioneering researcher in photosynthesis and plant physiology. Additionally, her great-uncle Charles Bonnet, like her father, was a famous naturalist.

Albertine did not believe marriage to be the be-all end-all of women's existence, and she did not think that women should be educated solely to please men. She has been compared to Mary Wollstonecraft for believing that single women must maintain themselves through education.

== Science ==
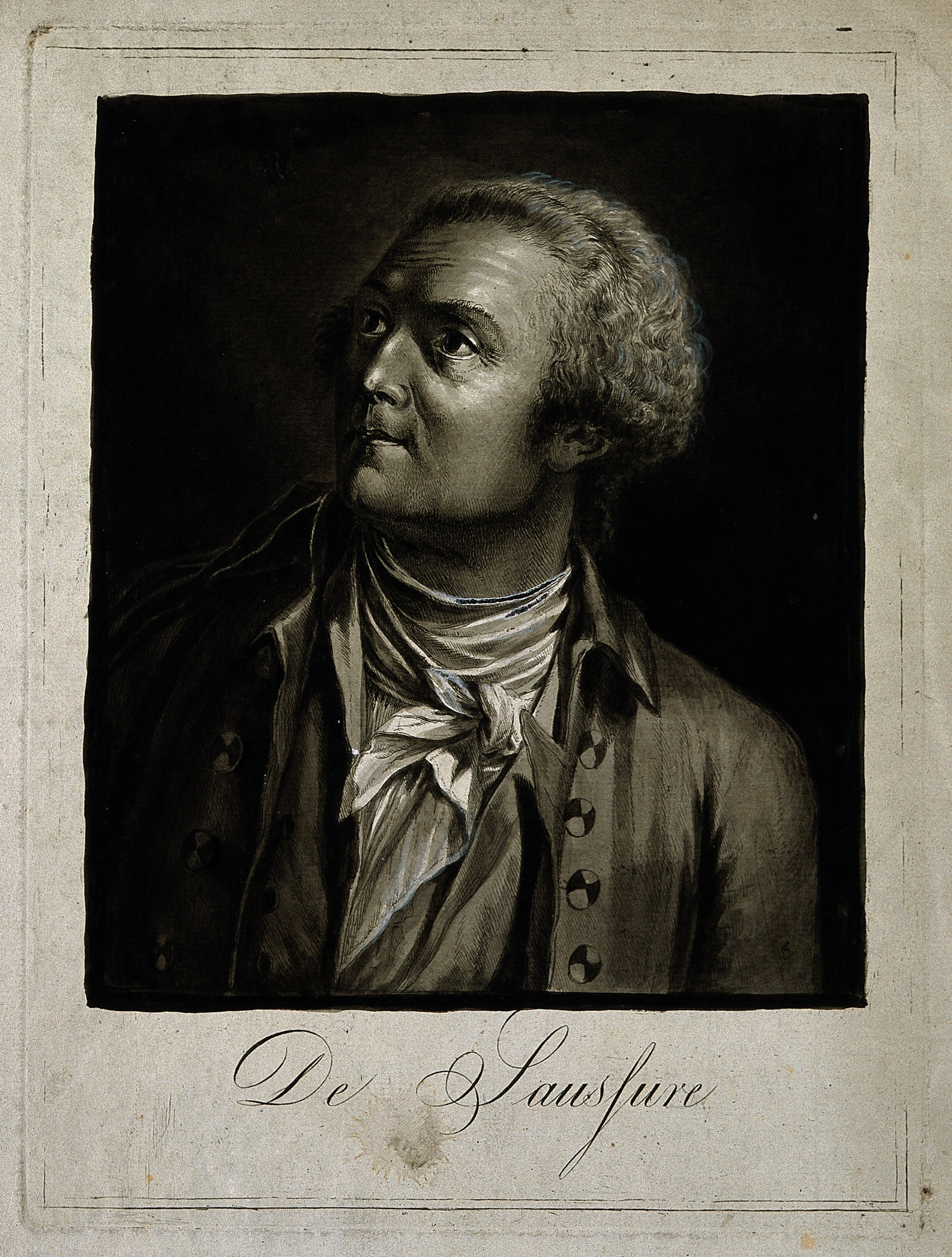
Horace Bénédict de Saussure

Encouraged by her scientist-father, Horace Bénédict de Saussure, Albertine began, at about age 10, to keep a diary in which she recorded her scientific observations. In time, she became an active experimentalist, and during an attempt to prepare oxygen she burned her face badly. As a young woman, she went on geological and botanical expeditions with her father, but her scientific activity declined after her marriage.

Necker de Saussure became acquainted with several well-known scientists of her day. The chemist Louis-Bernard Guyton de Morveau wrote that he had revived her interest in chemistry during a visit she paid to him. Other famous French chemists that she visited included Antoine Lavoisier; Antoine-François de Fourcroy; and Claude-Louis Berthollet. In a letter to her father, Albertine described experiments she performed in their laboratories.

== Written works ==
Albertine Necker de Saussure's literary work began relatively late in life, after her children were grown. Her principal work, l'Education Progressive or Etude du Cours de la Vie (1828), was a long and influential study of educational theory and the education of women. The work is divided into two parts, originally in three volumes which were published successively. In the first two volumes, in which she examines general education, she follows the child from birth to fourteen years old. The third volume is devoted to the education of women. Albertine believed that women's educational attainments were different from those of men because women did not have the same opportunities as men. She wanted women to fulfill their religious, familial and social obligations, but to do so in a self-possessed manner, and she sought to teach women to be unselfish but also to be able to make independent judgments. Further, she believed that, historically, social attitudes had been harmful to women's dignity and that traces of this remained in women's sense of themselves. She wanted to change this.

Albertine also wrote a biography of her friend Germaine de Staël for the first collected edition of de Staël's works, in 1821. In addition, Albertine authorized a French translation of August Wilhelm Schlegel's Vorlesungen über dramatische Kunst und Literatur (1809-1811).

== Legacy ==
Albertine Necker de Saussure's work l'Education Progressive is acknowledged as an educational classic and was influential in nineteenth-century England. She was active in the Groupe de Coppet (Coppet group), a salon that flourished in the years between the French Revolution and the Swiss Restoration, and she has been credited with spreading the spirit of the Coppet to a new generation of Genevan aristocrats, including Adolphe Pictet. The portrait of Albertine sitting next to her knitting basket is considered a most appropriate symbol of a late Enlightenment Genevoise.

Albertine Necker de Saussure is one of 999 notable women whose names are inscribed on the Heritage Floor in Judy Chicago's installation piece The Dinner Party at the Brooklyn Museum, New York.

== Family ==
Albertine Necker de Saussure and her husband, Jacques Necker, had four children. One of them was crystallographer and geologist Louis Albert Necker, HFRSE FGS (1786-1861) Albertine's grand-nephew, Ferdinand de Saussure (1857-1913), became an important linguist and student of semiotics.
