= Jacques-André Mallet =

Genevan astronomer (1740–1790)

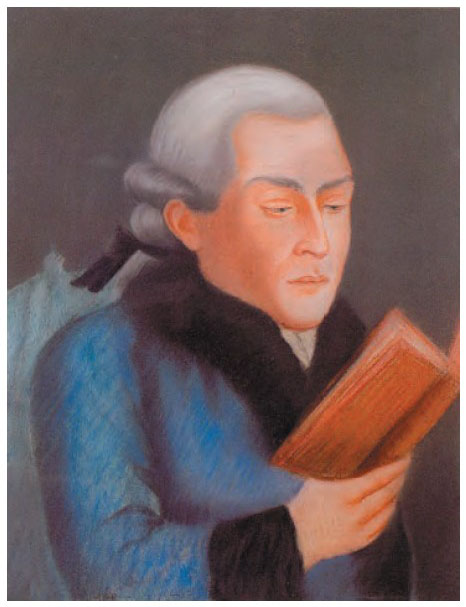
- Born: 23 September 1740; Geneva, Republic of Geneva
- Died: 31 January 1790 (aged 49); Avully, Republic of Geneva
- Education: Academy of Geneva; University of Basel
- Known for: Founding the first Geneva Observatory in 1772
- Scientific career
- Fields: Astronomy; Mathematics
- Workplaces: Academy of Geneva
- Academic advisors: Daniel Bernoulli; Louis Necker
- Notable students: Marc-Auguste Pictet; Jean Trembley

Jacques-André Mallet (French: [mɑlɛ]); also Mallet-Favre; 23 September 1740 – 31 January 1790) was a Genevan mathematician and astronomer.

In 1772, Mallet established and co-financed the first Geneva Observatory, and served as its director until his death in 1790. His research primarily concerned occultations, especially lunar and solar eclipses, sunspots, planetary orbits, and the orbits of the moons of Jupiter.

== Biography ==
=== Early life and education ===
Jacques-André was born in Geneva to Jean-Robert, a captain in the French Army, and his wife, Dorothée Favre, both of noble lineage. Jean-Robert was from a branch of the Mallet family of Huguenot merchants and bankers who had fled from Rouen to Geneva in 1557 to escape growing religious persecution. Through his mother, Dorothée, Jacques-André was also a direct descendant of the Eidguenot patriot François Favre, who famously clashed (with later support from his son-in-law, Ami Perrin) with the Calvinist rule of Geneva.

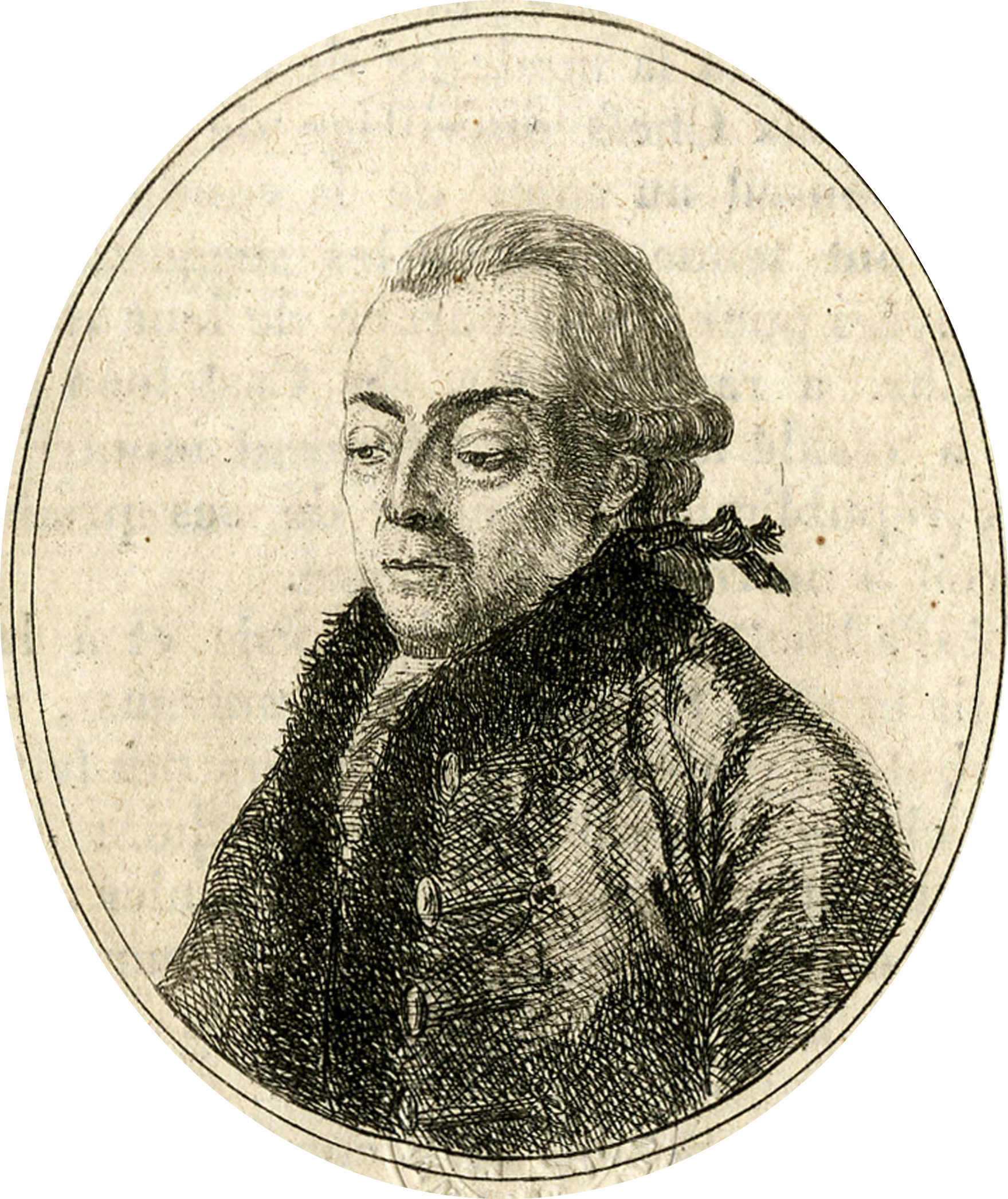
Engraving of Mallet by Jean-Alexandre Grand (c.1759-1820)

Jean-Robert wanted his son to become a career soldier, but a severe burn to the thigh in childhood rendered Jacques-André permanently disabled and unfit for future service. Jacques-André instead pursued an education in science and research, joining the Academy of Geneva in 1755. There, he was a pupil of the mathematician Louis Necker, brother of Jacques. Mallet also studied privately with Le Sage before leaving Geneva in 1760 to study at the University of Basel, where he was a student of Daniel Bernoulli. He completed his studies in 1762, and journeyed to France and England in 1765, where he became friends with astronomers Jérôme Lalande, John Bevis, who discovered the Crab Nebula, and Nevil Maskelyne, among others. Mallet's first introduction to the science of astronomy came from Lalande and Maskelyne during this trip.

=== Expedition to Lapland ===
In April 1768, upon the recommendation of Lalande and Bernoulli, Mallet was invited to Russia by Catherine the Great and the Saint Petersburg Academy of Sciences to prepare to observe the 1769 transit of Venus from Ponoy, Lapland. He was accompanied by another Genevan astronomer, Jean-Louis Pictet, whose own assignment was along the Umba. Others who were engaged to observe the transit include Stepan Rumovsky, Christian Mayer, and Christoph Euler, son of the mathematician Leonhard Euler. While in Saint Petersburg, readying themselves for their expedition north, Mallet and Pictet met with many members of high society, including Jean-Baptiste Charpentier and the Baron Stroganov, who, like Mallet, had been a pupil of Necker at the Geneva Academy.

The transit of Venus occurred on 3 June 1769. From 76 points globally, astronomers and navigators, like James Cook in Tahiti, were charged with observing the rare phenomenon. Unfortunately for Mallet, rain obscured the transit, and he was only able to view its beginning. Despite the weather, he still managed to publish useful data regarding solar parallax, allowing for better estimation of the Earth-Sun distance by him and his colleagues. In December 1776, perhaps owing to his contributions in Lapland, Mallet was awarded honorary membership in the Saint Petersburg Academy of Sciences.

=== Geneva Observatory ===
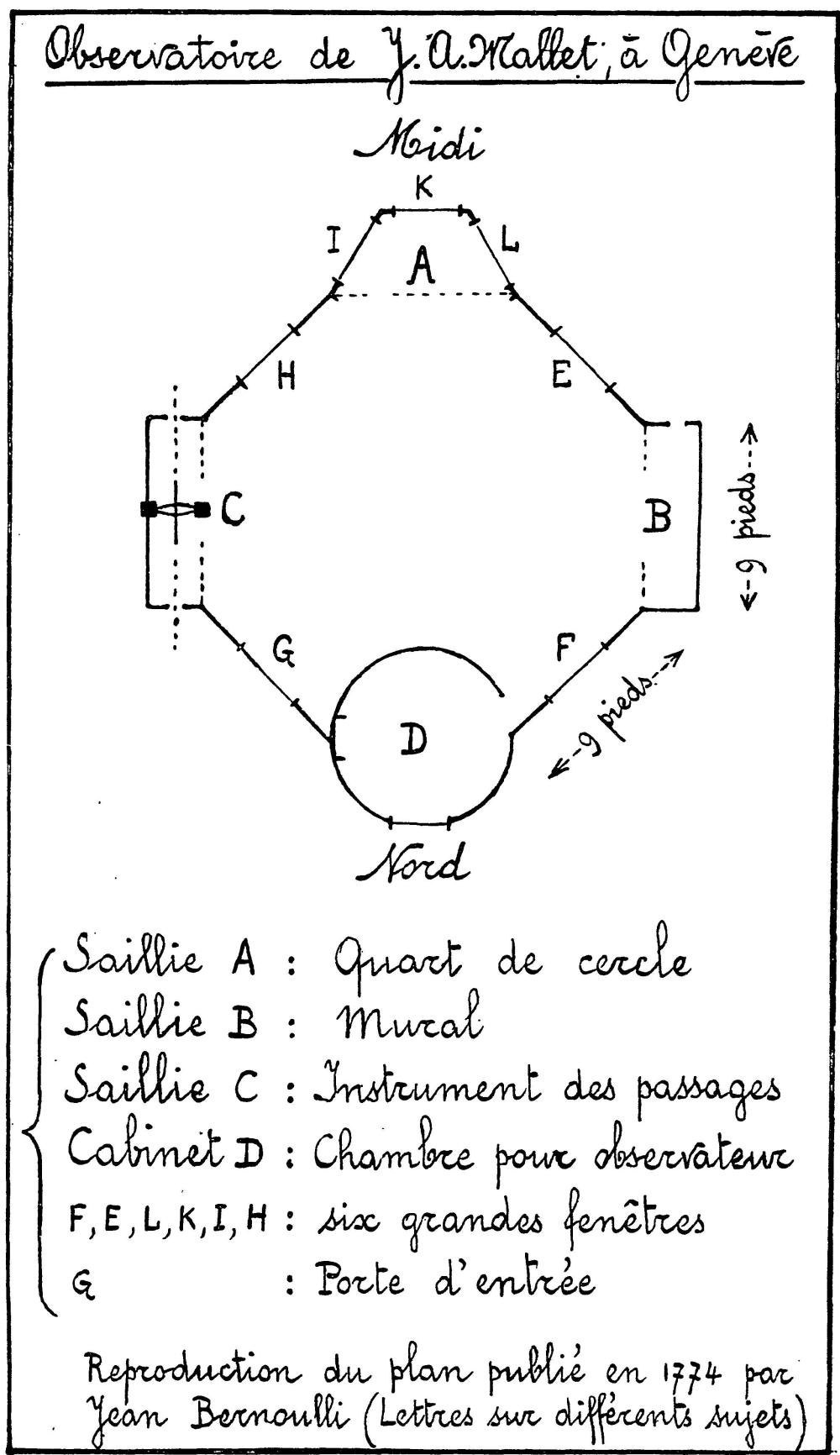
A reproduction of Mallet's observatory, based on the description given by Jean (Johann) Bernoulli.

After his return from Russia, Mallet was elected by the bourgeoisie to the Council of Two Hundred of Geneva, the canton's legislative authority. In 1771, he accepted an honorary professorship at the Academy of Geneva, acting as lifetime chairperson of the astronomy department. The same year, Mallet convinced his fellow members of the council to approve construction of a permanent observatory on the casemate of the Bastion St-Antoine, provided he settle a portion of the financing himself and supply accurate time calculations to the city watchmakers. Although the observatory, Geneva's first, was founded by Mallet in 1772, some sources suggest the project was completed in 1773.

For the structure's design, Mallet had departed from a traditional, utilitarian plan, (Note: Until the 1770s, most European observatories were created by repurposing upper stories in a previously-existing tall building, or by assembling new, many-storied towers. In either case, a flat terrace would adorn the roof, so that observations and experiments could be performed outside.) instead building a single-story octagon, capped with a drum and small dome. To furnish the observatory, Mallet purchased and installed a 10-foot achromatic telescope, likely manufactured by the English optician John Dollond, a high-precision clock from the French maître Jean-André Lepaute, and a meridian bezel, crafted by Jeremiah Sisson, to better calculate the duration of Earth's rotation for timekeeping. With his pupils and assistants, including Marc-Auguste Pictet and Jean Trembley, Mallet continued to observe celestial objects and bodies, and their interactions with each other and the Earth. In May 1772, Mallet was appointed as a corresponding member of the Académie des sciences by Jérôme Lalande. As a correspondent, Mallet was seen as effective, meticulous, and dependable.

=== Avully ===
In 1771, after the death of his father, Jacques-André became responsible for the family estate located in Avully, a small municipality southwest of Geneva. The property included a château, agricultural buildings, and arable land approaching the Rhône to the north and west. (Note: The Mallet estate was built in the 17th and 18th centuries by the Saladin family. In 1705, Antoine Saladin willed the estate to his daughter, Hélène Favre, Jacques-André's maternal grandmother. Antoine died in 1709, and when his daughter died in 1743, Jacques-André's mother Dorothée inherited the estate.) Each year, from about April to November, Mallet relocated to the country, eventually renovating a portion of the chateau's roof to act as his personal observatory. Mallet conducted official research in Avully, as well, with occasional assistance from Pictet and Trembley. In April 1773, having developed an interest in meteorology and crop cultivation, Mallet began a diary, diligently detailing weather patterns, livestock acquisition, sharecropping and labor, equipment maintenance, crop maturation, quality of wine production, and more. His records have provided useful information to historians in their study of the agrarian systems and climate of Geneva in the late 18th century. Mallet continued his diary until January 1789.

By January 1787, Mallet's health had deteriorated to such a great extent (Note: "Une espèce d'apoplexie lente, une augmentation extraordinaire du cœur, gênait la circulation; il s'endormait malgré lui; ses périodes d'assou pissement étaient toujours plus longues, et finalement il s'endormit pour tou jours, sans douleur, sans agonie, le 31 janvier 1790." (English: "A kind of slow apoplexy, an extraordinary enlargement of the heart, impeded the circulation; [Mallet] fell asleep in spite of himself; his periods of drowsiness were always longer, and finally he fell asleep for ever, without pain, without agony, on January 31, 1790.")) that he permanently retired to Avully, though he remained in his leadership position at the Geneva Observatory. In June of the same year, while passing through Geneva on his continental research expedition with Duke Ernest II, astronomer Franz Xaver von Zach visited Mallet in Avully to socialize and conduct research. Other scientists and intellectuals maintained epistolary communication with Mallet, including Johann Bernoulli, Joseph-Louis Lagrange, Jean Hyacinthe de Magellan, Johann Euler, and Charles Messier.

After his death in 1790, his former pupil Marc-Auguste Pictet succeeded Mallet as director of the observatory. Mallet's astronomical instruments from Avully were purchased by Pictet and the Geneva Arts Society, an organization founded by another of Pictet's instructors, Saussure, and donated to the Geneva Observatory. The Avully estate is currently protected as a regional cultural asset according to the Hague Convention and Swiss federal law.

== Family ==
Jacques-André was never married and fathered no known children. In 1773, his youngest sister, Marguerite (1745–1824), married the astronomer and lawyer Jean-Louis Pictet, Jacques-André's companion during the 1769 expedition to the Kola Peninsula. His other sister, Isabelle (1743–1798), continued Jacques-André's diary and estate accounts for two years after his last entry. When Isabelle, like her brother, died unmarried, the Avully estate passed to her nephew, Jean-Pierre Pictet, father of the zoologist and paleontologist Francois-Jules Pictet.

== Legacy ==
It is generally accepted that the lunar crater Mallet was named after Robert Mallet, the Irish geophysicist and engineer. However, since no given name was originally denoted, Swiss astronomer Marcel Golay, eighth director of the Geneva Observatory (1956–1992), suggested that Blagg and Müller had labelled the eponymous crater in honor of Jacques-André. Founder and director of Geneva's Museum of the History of Science, chemist Marc Cramer (1892–1976), also supported the misnomer theory, though he implied the crater was first named by Johann Schmidt.
