= Nicolas Théodore de Saussure =

Swiss chemist (1767–1845)

Nicolas-Théodore de Saussure
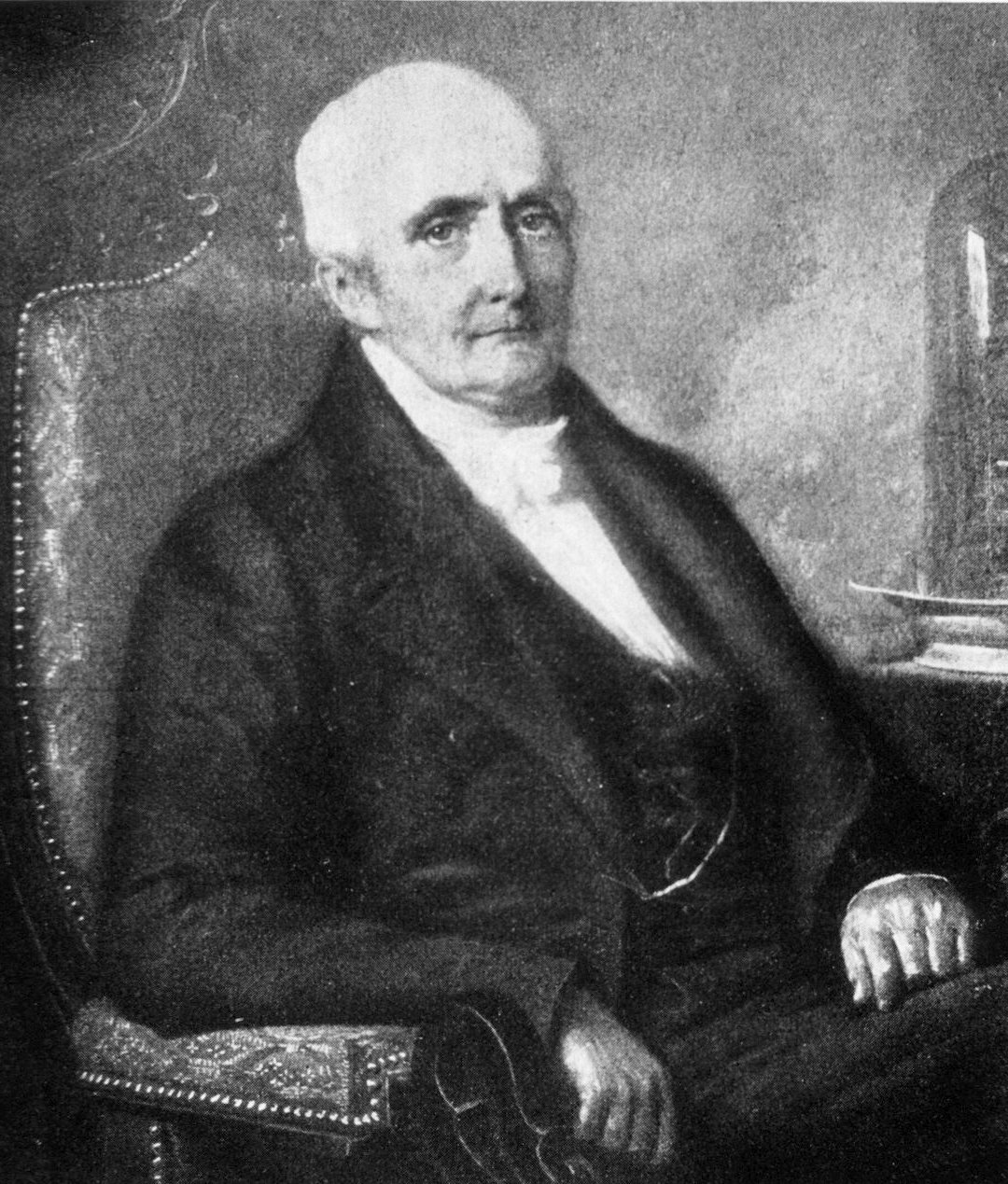
- Born: 14 October 1767; Geneva, Republic of Geneva
- Died: 18 April 1845 (aged 77); Geneva, Switzerland
- Citizenship: Genevan (until 1798 and 1813-1815), French (1798-1813) and Swiss since 1815
- Father: Horace Bénédict de Saussure
- Scientific career
- Fields: Chemistry, phytochemistry, plant physiology, photosynthesis
- Workplaces: University of Geneva
- Author abbrev. (botany): N.T.Sauss.

Nicolas-Théodore de Saussure (French pronunciation: [nikɔla teɔdɔʁ də sosyʁ]; 14 October 1767 – 18 April 1845) was a Swiss chemist and student of plant physiology who made seminal advances in phytochemistry. He is one of the major pioneers in the study of photosynthesis.

== Biography ==
Nicolas-Théodore de Saussure was born into a wealthy, aristocratic, Genevan family, many of whose members were accomplished in the natural sciences, including botany. He was the second child of Horace-Bénédict de Saussure, who was an eminent geologist, meteorologist, physicist and Alpine explorer. His great-uncle, Charles Bonnet, was a famous naturalist whose research included experiments on plant leaves. His grandfather Nicolas de Saussure was a noted agriculturist, for whom Nicolas-Théodore was named. Nicolas-Théodore was called "Théodore" to distinguish him from his grandfather, and he published his professional papers under the name Théodore de Saussure after his father died. While his father was alive, Théodore's papers were published under the name "de Saussure fils", as was the custom of the day for the sons of scientists having the same surname.

Nicolas-Théodore, his sister, Albertine, and brother, Alphonse, were educated at home because their father thought the educational system of the day was inferior. From 1782 to 1786, he attended the University of Geneva, where he studied math, science, and history.

During the early years of the French Revolution he traveled abroad, meeting with eminent scientists in London. He traveled abroad again in the late 1790s, and in 1800 became acquainted with Parisian scientists and other luminaries. While there, he took courses in chemistry and presented a paper. Upon returning to Geneva in 1802, he accepted an honorary professorship of mineralogy and geology at the University of Geneva. Although he taught very little, he remained on the faculty until 1835. He lived quietly and somewhat reclusively, doing research in his own private laboratory (as was the custom for scientists of his day), but, like others in his family, he was active in public affairs in Geneva, and he served on the Genevan representative council.

Nicolas-Théodore's sister, Albertine Necker de Saussure, was a noted early writer on the education of women. Nicolas-Théodore left no direct heirs, but he is the great-uncle of Ferdinand de Saussure, an important linguist and semiotician.

== Career ==
As a young man, Nicolas-Théodore accompanied his father on his Alpine expeditions, some of them under arduous conditions, and assisted him with experiments in physics, chemistry, mineralogy, and meteorology. In one experiment, Nicolas-Théodore confirmed Boyle's law by a new method: He carefully weighed a tightly closed flask at many different altitudes and found that the differences in weight were exactly proportional to the differences in barometric pressure readings. In other research in the physical sciences, he named the mineral dolomite after Déodat Gratet de Dolomieu, in March 1792.

Nicolas-Théodore was attracted to chemistry by Lavoisier's discoveries, and he adopted Lavoisier's new system of chemistry early in life. He became interested in the chemistry and physiology of plants, including gas exchange and the ways that different soils affected their growth. His early papers on these subjects laid the groundwork for some of the chapters in his magnum opus, Recherches chimiques sur la Végétation ("Chemical Research on Plant Growth"), published in 1804. This book was the first summation of the fundamental process of photosynthesis and a major contribution to the understanding of plant physiology. In contrast to some of his predecessors in the field of photosynthesis research, Saussure based his conclusions on extensive quantitative data that he had collected.

In Recherches chimiques sur la Végétation (1804) Saussure showed that the increase in the mass of a plant as it grows could not be due only to the uptake of CO_{2}, but was also a result of the incorporation of water into plant dry matter. He demonstrated this by showing that plants grown with their roots in water and their shoots in an atmosphere of ordinary air with added CO_{2} increased in dry weight by an amount much greater than could be attributed to the assimilation of the CO_{2} gas available to them. Plainly, the weight increase had come from the water. In addition, Saussure demonstrated that plants obtain their carbon from the carbon dioxide in the atmosphere, not through uptake from humus in the soil, as his immediate predecessors in photosynthesis research had generally believed. He also showed that plants require mineral nutrients, which they take up from the soil, and nitrogen, although he did not trace the source of plant nitrogen definitively to the soil. Saussure's finding that the source of plant minerals was the soil disproved the widely held view that mineral substances in plants arose from vague "transmutations" within the plant. His work enabled completion of the basic, overall chemical equation of photosynthesis, according to which carbon dioxide and water, in the presence of light, are converted by a green plant into fixed carbon (such as glucose, food for the plant), with gaseous oxygen released as a byproduct. Based on his accomplishments in plant chemistry and physiology, Saussure is considered the last of the major early pioneers of photosynthesis research, completing the work begun by his predecessors, including Jan Baptist van Helmont, Joseph Priestley, Jan Ingenhousz, and Jean Senebier.

For the several decades following publication of Saussure's book, his findings about the atmospheric source of plant carbon and the soil source for plant mineral nutrients were largely neglected, and little progress was made in further unraveling the chemical processes within plants. Then, Saussure's findings were re-discovered and revived by the eminent German chemist Justus von Liebig. In addition, field research by French agricultural chemist Jean-Baptiste Boussingault substantiated Saussure's conclusions on the importance of mineral nutrients that plants take up from the soil. Saussure's findings have had a significant impact on many disciplines, including chemistry, agriculture, agronomy, soil science, plant physiology, and plant nutrition. He is considered one of the pioneers of modern agriculture.

In addition to his studies in plant physiology, Nicolas-Théodore made important advances in the analysis of organic substances. He determined the composition of alcohol and ether, and studied fermentation, the conversion of starches into sugars, and many other biochemical processes. In 1815 he was one of the founding members of Société Helvétique des Sciences Naturelles (Swiss Academy of Natural Sciences).

== Honours ==
- 1808 Correspondent of the First Class of the French Institute.
- 1812 Member of the Royal Institute of the Netherlands.
- 1820 Fellow of the Royal Society of London
- 1820 Member of the Bavarian Academy of Sciences and Humanities.
- 1830 Foreign member of the Institute of Bologna.
- 1837 Plant genera Saussurea and Saussuria are named after him.
- 1842 Elected president of the Congrés Scientifique de Lyons.

== Works ==
- Recherches chimiques sur la Végétation. Chez laV.e Nyon, Paris. (Reprinted in facsimile: 1957, Gauthier-Villars, Paris; and 2010, Nabu Press)
  - Three translations of Recherches chimiques sur la Végétation:
    - First German translation: Theodor von Saussure's chemische Untersuchungen über die Vegetation with commentary, by F.S. Voigt. Reclam, Leipzig 1805.
    - Second German translation: Chemische Untersuchungen über die Vegetation . Vols. 1&2. Engelmann, Leipzig 1890 Digital edition by the University and State Library Düsseldorf
    - English translation: Chemical Research on Plant Growth: A translation of Théodore de Saussure's Recherches chimiques sur la Végétation by Jane F. Hill, Springer Science+Business Media, New York, 2013. ISBN 978-1-4614-4136-6.
