= Cologny =

- Municipality
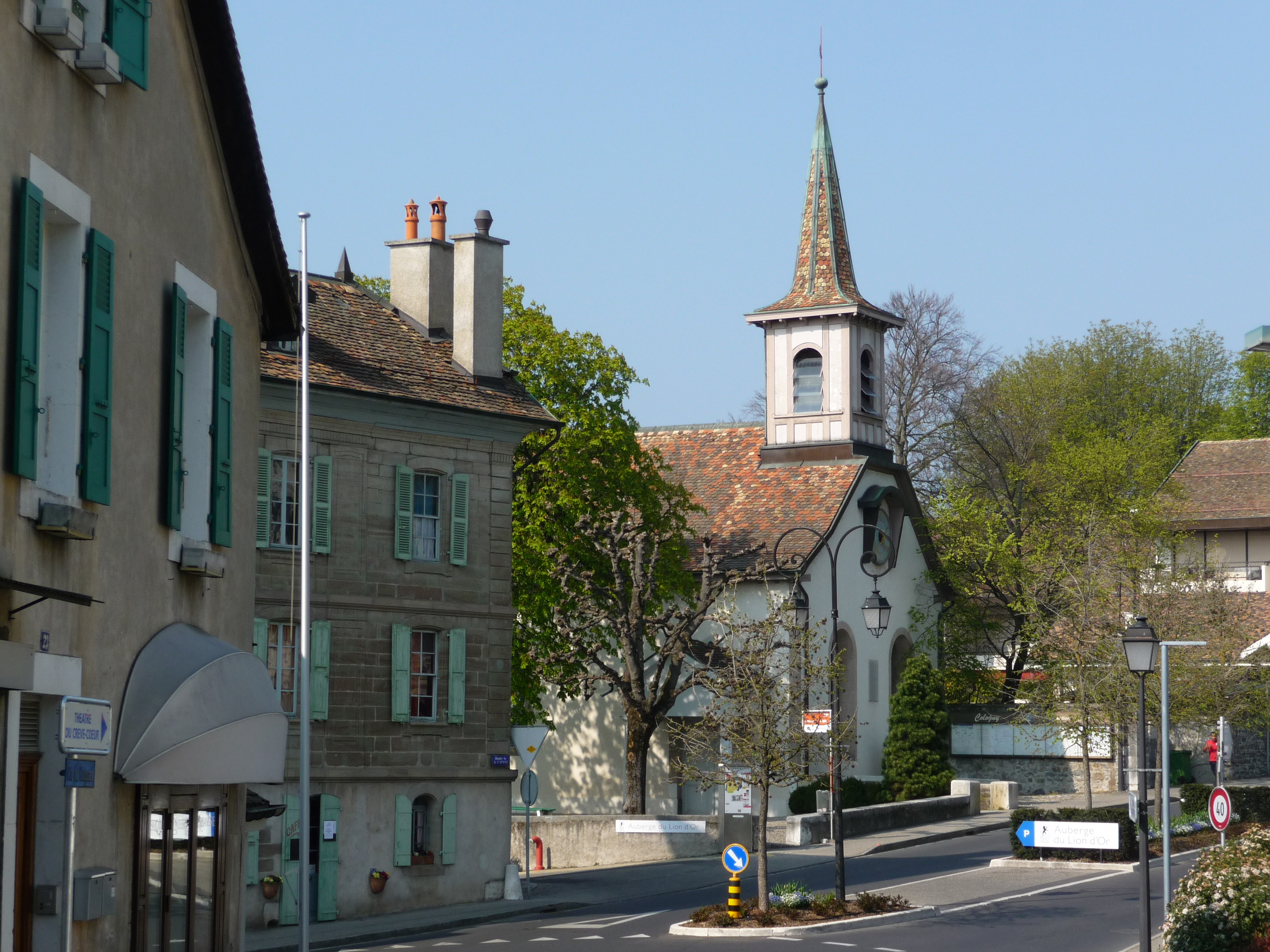
- Cologny in April 2010

- Flag Coat of arms
- Location of Cologny
- Location within Switzerland Location within Canton of Geneva
- Coordinates: 46°12′56″N 006°10′51″E
- Country: Switzerland
- Canton: Geneva
- District: n.a.

Government
  - Mayor: Maire; Catherine Pahnke

Area
  - Total: 3.67 km^{2} (1.42 sq mi)
- Elevation: 460 m (1,510 ft)

Population (December 2020)
  - Total: 5,866
  - Density: 1,600/km^{2} (4,140/sq mi)
- Demonym: Colognotes (French)
- Time zone: UTC+01:00 (CET)
  - Summer (DST): UTC+02:00 (CEST)
- Postal code: 1223
- SFOS number: 6617
- ISO 3166 code: CH-GE
- Surrounded by: Chêne-Bougeries, Choulex, Collonge-Bellerive, Geneva (Genève), Vandœuvres
- Website: cologny.ch

Cologny (French pronunciation: [kɔlɔɲi]) is a municipality in the Canton of Geneva, Switzerland.

== History ==
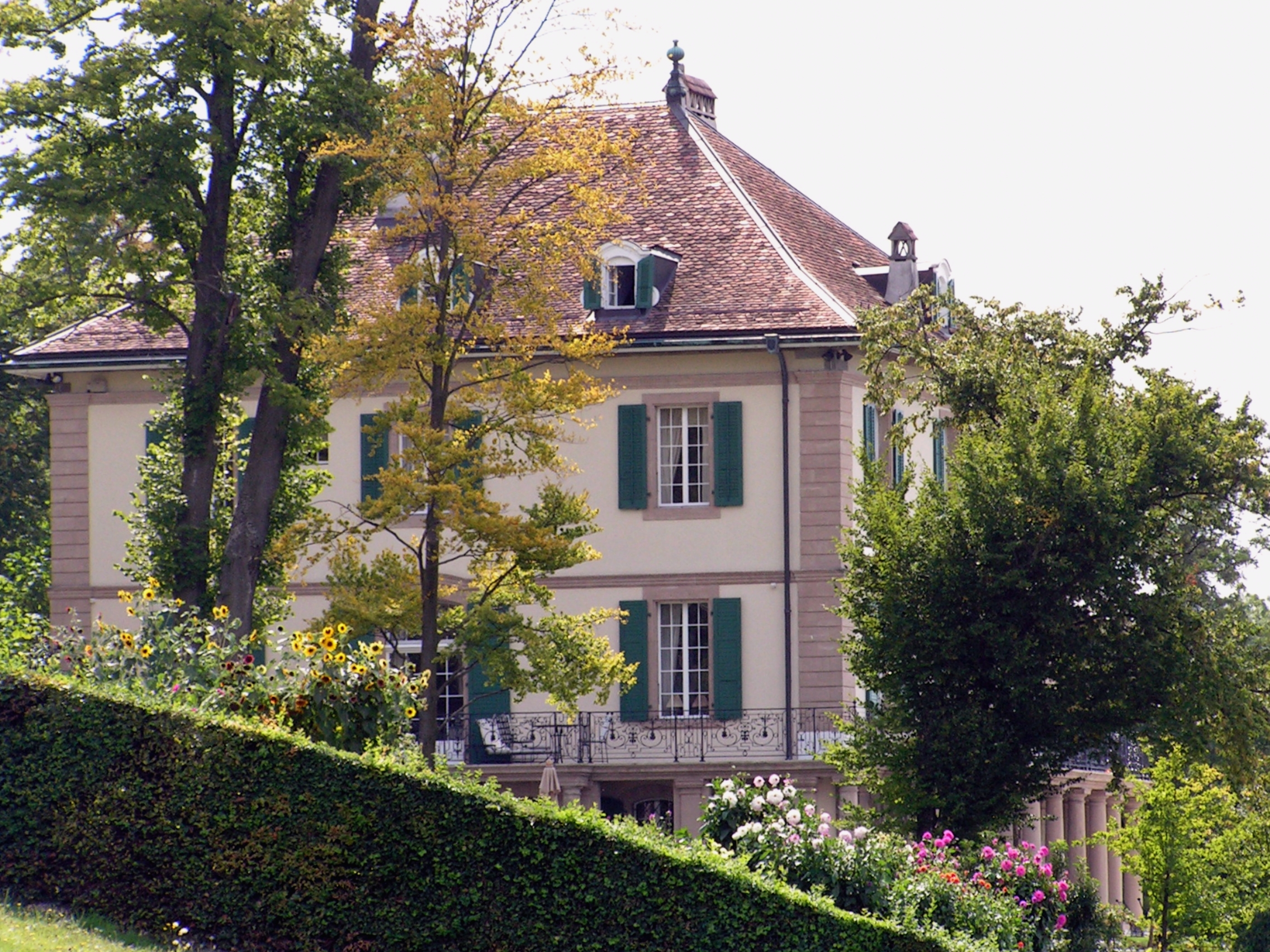
Villa Diodati in Cologny, where Frankenstein and "The Vampyre" were begun

Cologny is first mentioned in 1208 as Colognier.

The oldest trace of a settlement in the area is a Neolithic lake side village which was discovered near the village of La Belotte. The Lake Geneva area was conquered by the Roman Republic in the 2nd century BC. The Romans built a road from Corsier through the Cologny area to Frontenex during their centuries old rule of the region.

During the Middle Ages, it was part of the lands of the Counts of Geneva, before it was acquired by the Prince Bishopric of Geneva. The village church of Saint Peter was placed under the parish of Vandœuvres in 1406, indicating that it was probably built before the 15th century. In 1536, Cologny joined the new faith of the Protestant Reformation as nearby Geneva became a center of reform. Two years later, in May 1538 a treaty between Bern and Geneva placed Cologny in the city of Geneva.

In the late 16th century and into the 17th century a number of Geneva publishers moved to or set up offices in Cologny. By claiming Cologny or Colonia Allobrogum as the publication location, they were able to circumvent French laws which banned books from Geneva. Beginning in the 18th century elegant chalets sprung up along the shores of Lake Geneva in Cologny. One of the most famous is Villa Diodati in which Lord Byron, John Polidori, Mary Shelley and Percy Bysshe Shelley spent part of the Year Without a Summer in 1816. Due to the poor weather, the guests spent days indoors telling each other horror stories. Mary Shelley's Frankenstein and John Polidori's The Vampyre, the first modern vampire story, both resulted.

The town council of Cologny met for the first time on 9 December 1800, after Geneva had been annexed into France following the 1798 French invasion of Switzerland. The mathematician Louis Necker (1730–1804), elder brother of the Statesman Jacques Necker, died in Cologny.

In the 20th century, many wealthy individuals and organizations have moved to Cologny. Traditionally the municipality consisted of small villages with many farms. However, by 1965 there were only eight working farms and by 1975 that number had decreased to two. Today it is one of the most affluent municipalities in the Canton of Geneva.

== Geography ==
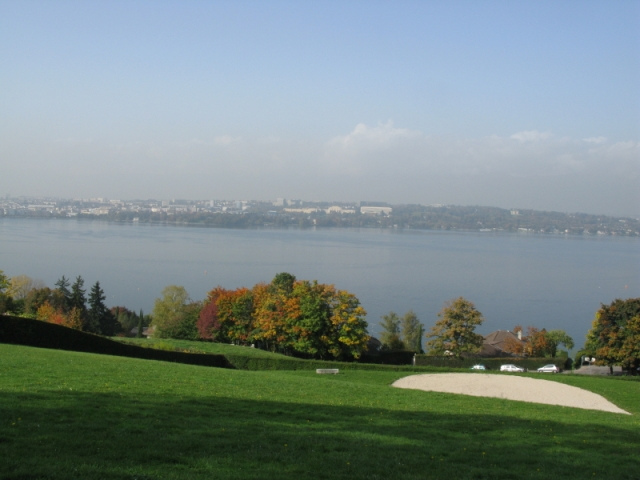
View from the Geneva Golf Club across Lake Geneva

Cologny has an area, as of 2009, of 3.67 square kilometers (1.42 sq mi). Of this area, 0.65 km^{2} (0.25 sq mi) or 17.7% is used for agricultural purposes, while 0.15 km^{2} (0.058 sq mi) or 4.1% is forested. Of the rest of the land, 2.88 km^{2} (1.11 sq mi) or 78.5% is settled (buildings or roads), 0.01 km^{2} (2.5 acres) or 0.3% is either rivers or lakes.

Of the built up area, housing and buildings made up 60.5% and transportation infrastructure made up 12.3%. Power and water infrastructure as well as other special developed areas made up 1.1% of the area while parks, green belts and sports fields made up 4.4%. Out of the forested land, 2.2% of the total land area is heavily forested and 1.9% is covered with orchards or small clusters of trees. Of the agricultural land, 8.7% is used for growing crops and 5.4% is pastures, while 3.5% is used for orchards or vine crops. All the water in the municipality is in lakes.

The municipality is located on the left bank of Lake Geneva and includes a golf course, the Geneva Golf Club. It consists of the village of Cologny and numerous hamlets of including La Belotte and Ruth. The area consists mainly of villa-style residential housing, and to a lesser extent, small commercial outlets.

The municipality of Cologny consists of the sub-sections or villages of Saint-Paul, Stade-de-Frontenex, Rampe-de-Cologny, Cologny - village, Ruth - Nant d'Argent and Prés-de-la-Gradelle.

== Demographics ==
Largest groups of foreign residents 2013
Nationality	Amount	% total (population)
France	555	11.1
UK	159	3.2
Italy	136	2.7
Portugal	111	2.2
USA	84	1.7
Belgium	72	1.4
Germany	68	1.4
Spain	55	1.1
Russia	53	1.1
Sweden	42	0.8

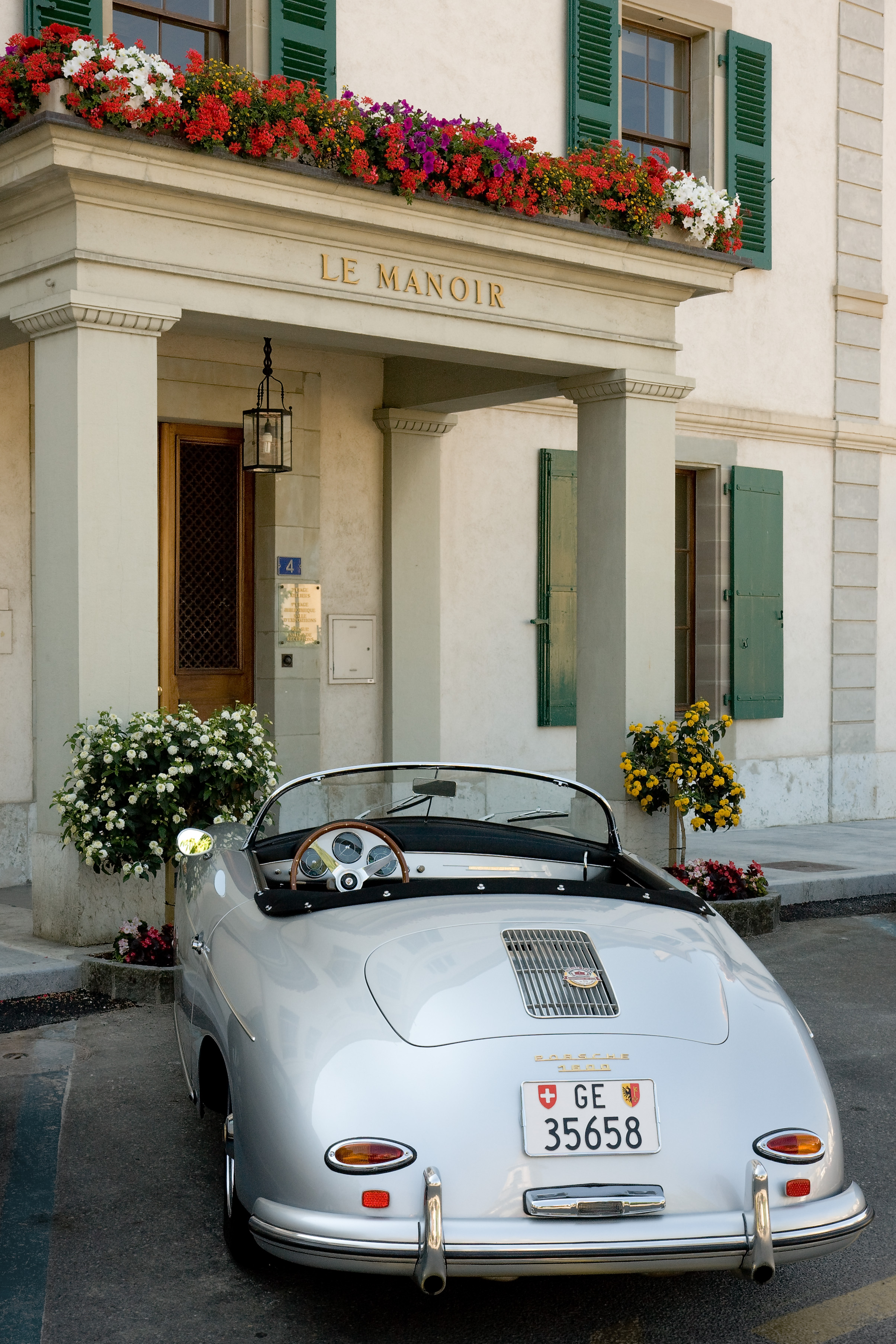
Porsche 1600 in front of "Le Manoir" or Manor House in Cologny

Cologny has a population (as of December 2020) of 5,866. As of 2008, 37.7% of the population are resident foreign nationals. Over the last 10 years (1999–2009 ) the population has grown at a rate of 4.6%. It has grown at a rate of 4.9% due to migration and at a rate of -1% due to births and deaths.

Most of the population (as of 2000) speaks French (3,575 or 76.1%), with English being second most common (391 or 8.3%) and German being third (225 or 4.8%). There are 3 people who speak Romansh.

As of 2008, the gender distribution of the population was 47.5% male and 52.5% female. The population was made up of 1,399 Swiss men (28.5% of the population) and 930 (19.0%) non-Swiss men. There were 1,630 Swiss women (33.3%) and 942 (19.2%) non-Swiss women. Of the population in the municipality 679 or about 14.5% were born in Cologny and lived there in 2000. There were 1,091 or 23.2% who were born in the same canton, while 560 or 11.9% were born somewhere else in Switzerland, and 1,953 or 41.6% were born outside of Switzerland.

In 2008, there were 21 live births to Swiss citizens and 18 births to non-Swiss citizens, and in same time span, there were 28 deaths of Swiss citizens and 6 non-Swiss citizen deaths. Ignoring immigration and emigration, the population of Swiss citizens decreased by 7 while the foreign population increased by 12. There were 19 Swiss men and 22 Swiss women who emigrated from Switzerland. At the same time, there were 43 non-Swiss men and 6 non-Swiss women who immigrated from another country to Switzerland. The total Swiss population change in 2008 (from all sources, including moves across municipal borders) was a decrease of 33 and the non-Swiss population increased by 33 people. This represents a population growth rate of 0.0%.

The age distribution of the population (as of 2000) is children and teenagers (0–19 years old) make up 24.3% of the population, while adults (20–64 years old) make up 58.8% and seniors (over 64 years old) make up 16.9%.

As of 2000, there were 1,853 people who were single and never married in the municipality. There were 2,329 married individuals, 248 widows or widowers and 267 individuals who are divorced.

As of 2000, there were 1,685 private households in the municipality, and an average of 2.5 persons per household. There were 443 households that consist of only one person and 155 households with five or more people. Out of a total of 1,734 households that answered this question, 25.5% were households made up of just one person and there were 11 adults who lived with their parents. Of the rest of the households, there are 456 married couples without children, 633 married couples with children, and there were 108 single parents with a child or children. There were 34 households that were made up of unrelated people and 49 households that were made up of some sort of institution or another collective housing.

In 2000 there were 634 single family homes (or 72.0% of the total) out of a total of 880 inhabited buildings. There were 161 multi-family buildings (18.3%), along with 48 multi-purpose buildings that were mostly used for housing (5.5%) and 37 other use buildings (commercial or industrial) that also had some housing (4.2%). Of the single family homes 62 were built before 1919, while 131 were built between 1990 and 2000. The greatest number of single family homes (101) were built between 1981 and 1990.

In 2000 there were 1,784 apartments in the municipality. The most common apartment size was 4 rooms of which there were 388. There were 99 single room apartments and 780 apartments with five or more rooms. Of these apartments, a total of 1,554 apartments (87.1% of the total) were permanently occupied, while 195 apartments (10.9%) were seasonally occupied and 35 apartments (2.0%) were empty. As of 2009, the construction rate of new housing units was 2.4 new units per 1000 residents. The vacancy rate for the municipality, in 2010, was 0.41%.

The historical population is given in the following chart:

== Heritage sites of national significance ==
The Bibliotheca Bodmeriana (Bodmer Library), which was given as a donation by Martin Bodmer a month before his death on 26 February 1971, and Campagne Diodati are listed as Swiss heritage site of national significance.

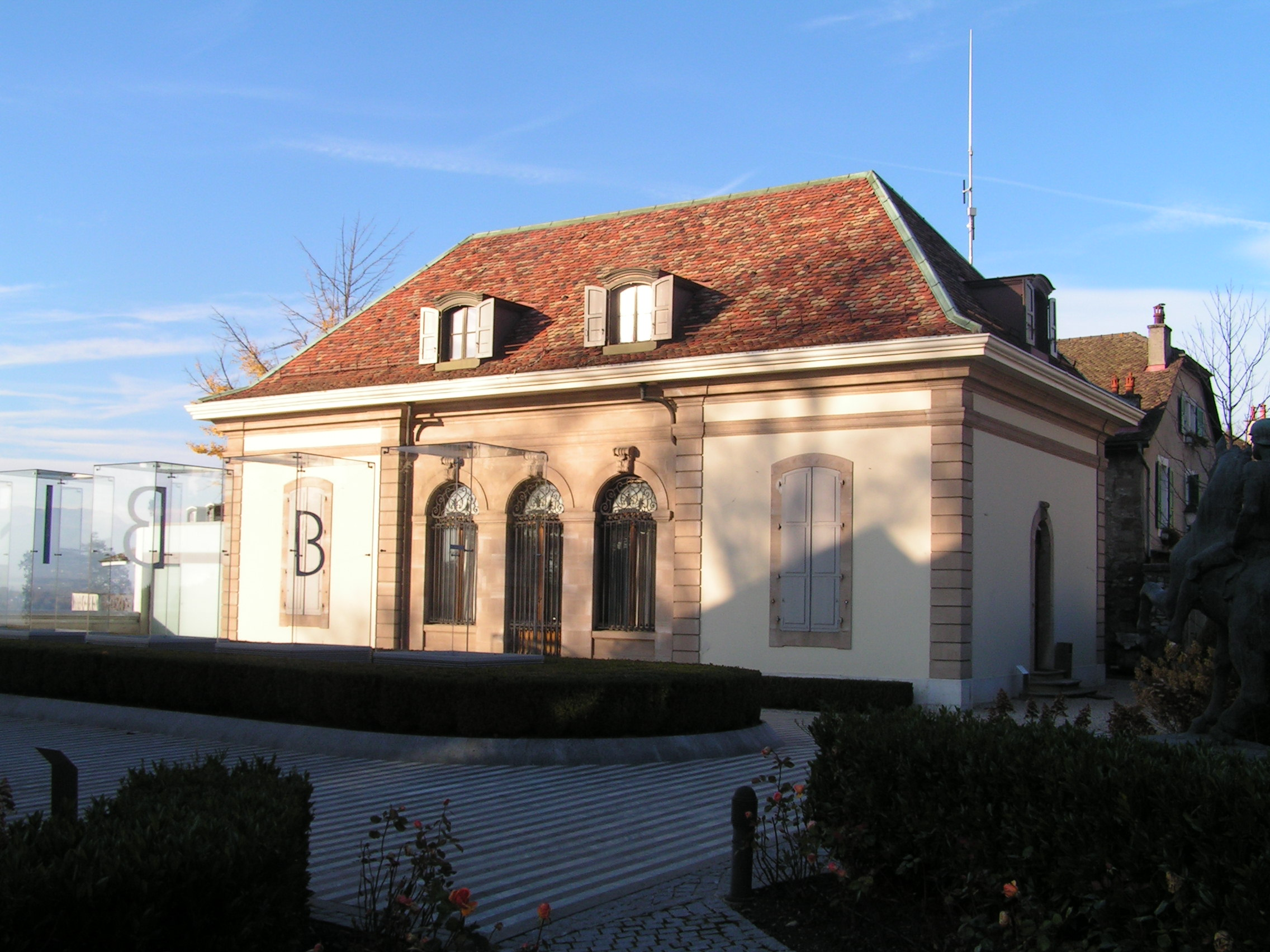
Bodmer Library

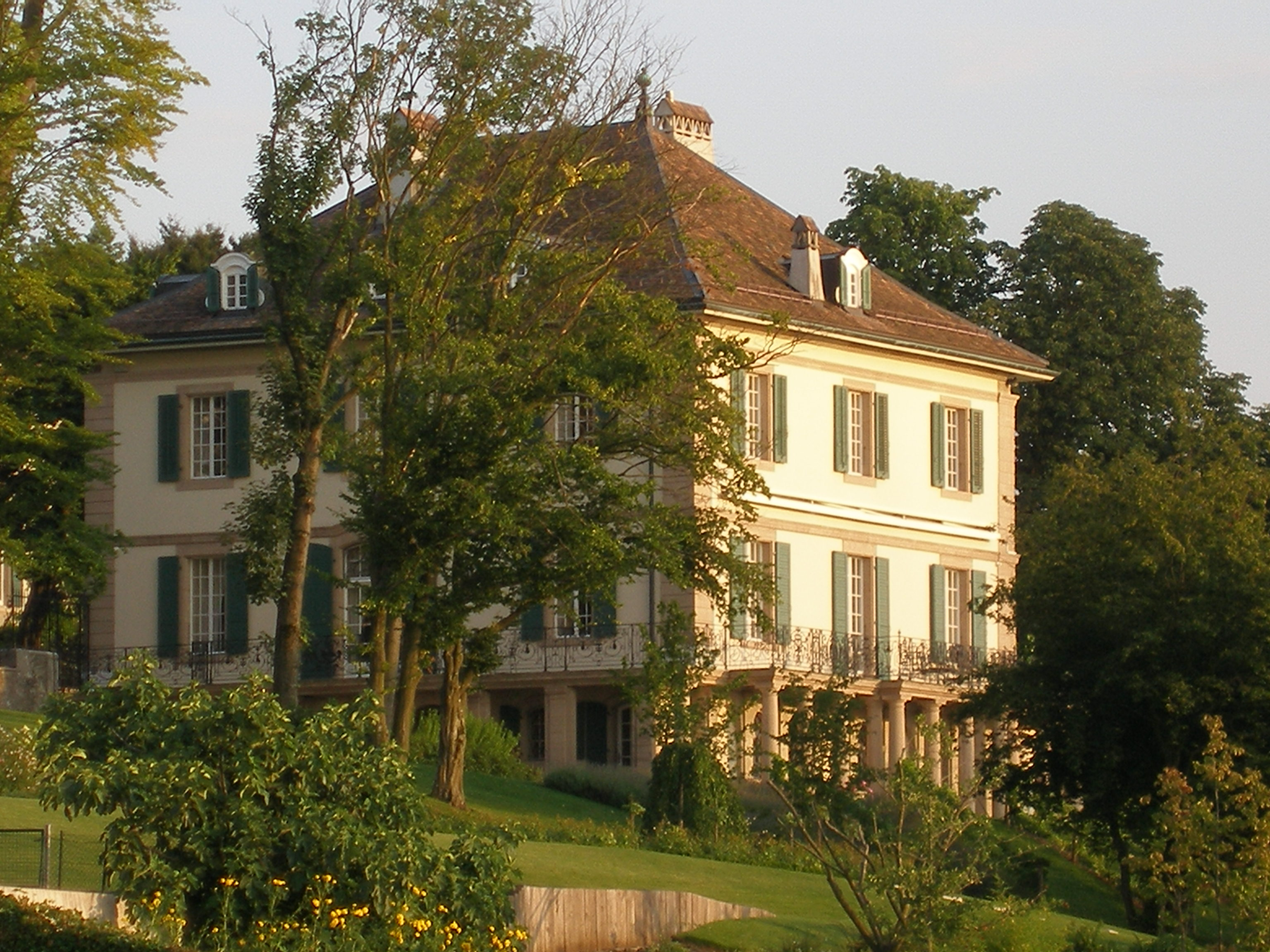
Campagne Diodati

== Politics ==
In the 2007 federal election, the most popular party was the LPS Party which received 35.84% of the vote. The next three most popular parties were the SVP (22.31%), the FDP (10.5%) and the SP (9.48%). In the federal election, a total of 1,380 votes were cast, and the voter turnout was 55.4%.

In the 2009 Grand Conseil election, there were a total of 2,446 registered voters of which 1,167 (47.7%) voted. The most popular party in the municipality for this election was the Libéral with 43.1% of the ballots. In the canton-wide election they received the highest proportion of votes. The second most popular party was the UDC (with 10.5%), they were seventh in the canton-wide election, while the third most popular party was the Les Radicaux (with 10.4%), they were sixth in the canton-wide election.

For the 2009 Conseil d'État election, there were a total of 2,430 registered voters of which 1,283 (52.8%) voted.

In 2011, all the municipalities held local elections, and in Cologny there were 19 spots open on the municipal council. There were a total of 3,172 registered voters of which 1,444 (45.5%) voted. Out of the 1,444 votes, there were 5 blank votes, 8 null or unreadable votes and 119 votes with a name that was not on the list.

== Economy ==
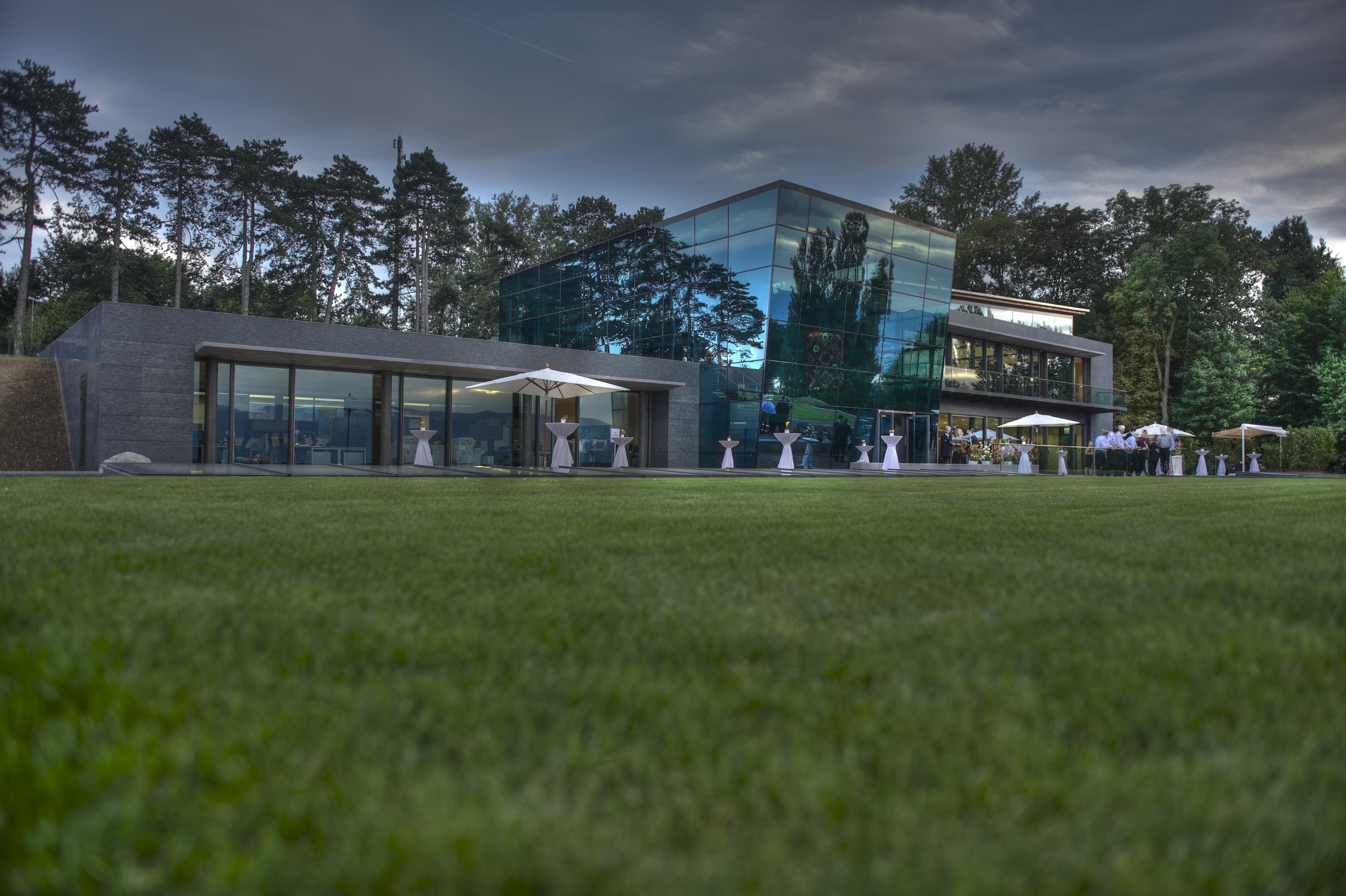
New addition to World Economic Forum building (2010)

It is the headquarters of the World Economic Forum.

As of 2010, Cologny had an unemployment rate of 2.7%. As of 2008, there were 4 people employed in the primary economic sector and about 1 business involved in this sector. 44 people were employed in the secondary sector and there were 16 businesses in this sector. 1,261 people were employed in the tertiary sector, with 130 businesses in this sector. There were 2,052 residents of the municipality who were employed in some capacity, of which females made up 40.5% of the workforce.

In 2008 the total number of full-time equivalent jobs was 1,106. The number of jobs in the primary sector was 4, all of which were in agriculture. The number of jobs in the secondary sector was 39 of which 5 or (12.8%) were in manufacturing and 34 (87.2%) were in construction. The number of jobs in the tertiary sector was 1,063. In the tertiary sector, 97 or 9.1% were in wholesale or retail sales or the repair of motor vehicles, 18 or 1.7% were in the movement and storage of goods, 87 or 8.2% were in a hotel or restaurant, 23 or 2.2% were in the information industry, 24 or 2.3% were the insurance or financial industry, 34 or 3.2% were technical professionals or scientists, 98 or 9.2% were in education and 143 or 13.5% were in health care.

In 2000, there were 960 workers who commuted into the municipality and 1,676 workers who commuted away. The municipality is a net exporter of workers, with about 1.7 workers leaving the municipality for every one entering. About 17.7% of the workforce coming into Cologny are coming from outside Switzerland, while 0.4% of the locals commute out of Switzerland for work. Of the working population, 19.7% used public transportation to get to work, and 56.4% used a private car.

== Religion ==
From the 2000 census, 1,588 or 33.8% were Roman Catholic, while 1,025 or 21.8% belonged to the Swiss Reformed Church. Of the rest of the population, there were 123 members of an Orthodox church (or about 2.62% of the population), there were 3 individuals (or about 0.06% of the population) who belonged to the Christian Catholic Church, and there were 48 individuals (or about 1.02% of the population) who belonged to another Christian church. There were 302 individuals (or about 6.43% of the population) who were Jewish, and 197 (or about 4.19% of the population) who were Muslim. There were 16 individuals who were Buddhist, 22 individuals who were Hindu and 6 individuals who belonged to another church. 847 (or about 18.03% of the population) belonged to no church, are agnostic or atheist, and 520 individuals (or about 11.07% of the population) did not answer the question.

== Education ==
In Cologny about 1,048 or (22.3%) of the population have completed non-mandatory upper secondary education, and 1,626 or (34.6%) have completed additional higher education (either university or a Fachhochschule). Of the 1,626 who completed tertiary schooling, 35.7% were Swiss men, 28.8% were Swiss women, 21.5% were non-Swiss men and 14.0% were non-Swiss women.

During the 2009–2010 school year, there were a total of 883 students in the Cologny school system. The education system in the Canton of Geneva allows young children to attend two years of non-obligatory Kindergarten. During that school year, there were 48 children who were in a pre-kindergarten class. The canton's school system provides two years of non-mandatory kindergarten and requires students to attend six years of primary school, with some of the children attending smaller, specialized classes. In Cologny, there were 74 students in kindergarten or primary school and 9 students were in the special, smaller classes. The secondary school program consists of three lower, obligatory years of schooling, followed by three to five years of optional, advanced schools. There were 74 lower secondary students who attended school in Cologny. There were 144 upper secondary students from the municipality along with 28 students who were in a professional, non-university track program. An additional 359 students attended a private school.

As of 2000, there were 417 students in Cologny who came from another municipality, while 699 residents attended schools outside the municipality.
