= Jean Trembley =

Genevan mathematician (1749–1811)

Jean Trembley (April 13, 1749 – September 18, 1811), born at Geneva and died in Le Mas-d'Agenais, was a Genevan mathematician who contributed to the development of differential equations, finite differences, and the calculus of probabilities. He was also active in philosophy, astronomy and psychology.

== Biography ==
Nephew of the naturalist Abraham Trembley, Jean Trembley first studied law in Geneva, before turning to astronomy under the direction of Jacques-André Mallet, director of the Geneva Observatory. He also traveled in the Alps with Horace-Bénédict de Saussure and made with him his doctoral dissertation on the theory of generation (1767). In it, he advocated the views of Charles Bonnet, whose disciple he always pretended to be in the fields of philosophy and psychology.

He made part of his career in Berlin, where he was a member of the Prussian Academy of Science and Letters.

He published 30 articles in the Mémoires de l'Académie de Berlin and a few others in Bode's Jahrbuch and in other periodicals.

He was a correspondent of the Paris Academy of Sciences (1784), later Institute of France (1804), an honorary member of the Imperial Academy of Russia in St. Petersburg (1793), and a member of the Berlin Academy of Prussia (1794; honorary member in 1807). He was corrispondent of the Turin Academy of Sciences.
