= Louis Necker =

Genevan mathematician, physicist, professor, banker (1730–1804)

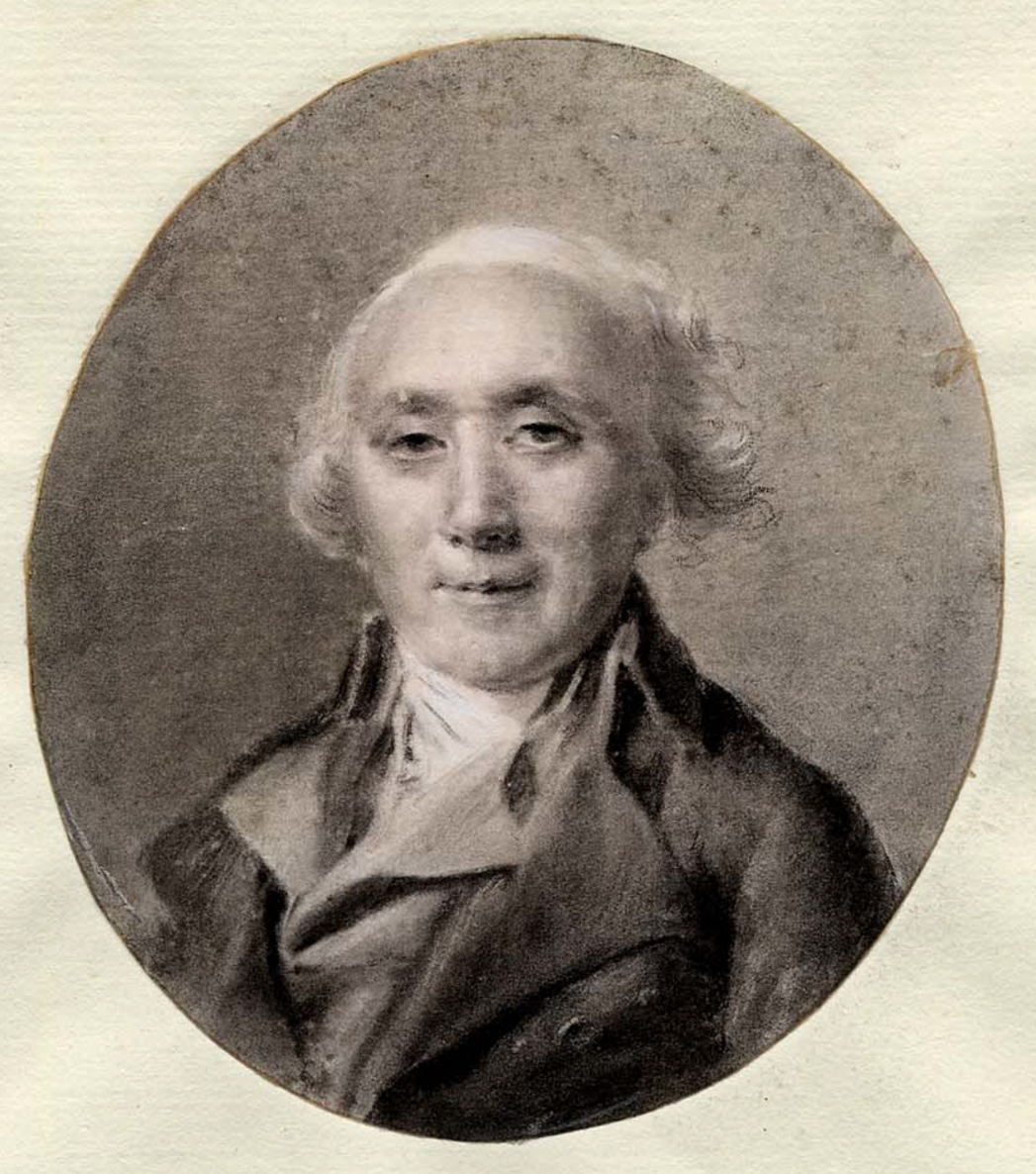

Gouache from Cologny on Lake Geneva by Jean-Antoine Linck

Louis Necker, called de Germany (31 August 1730 in Geneva – 31 July 1804 in Cologny) was a Genevan mathematician, physicist, professor and a banker in Paris. He was the elder brother of Jacques Necker, minister of Finance in France when the French Revolution broke out.

== Biography ==
Louis Necker studied mathematics and physics at the Academy of Geneva. He finished his studies in philosophy with a thesis on electricity (1747), then graduated in law (1751). For a while he became the governor of probably Charles Christian, Prince of Nassau-Weilburg and Simon August, Count of Lippe-Detmold during their stay in Geneva and traveled with them to the University of Turin. He managed a boarding school for young Englishmen held by his father Charles Frederick, lawyer and professor of law at the Geneva Academy. He was appointed as the hofmeister of a Baron van Van Wassenaer and a Bentinck.

In 1752 he purchased Jean Jallabert's physics laboratory and in 1757 acceded the chair of mathematics and the honorary chair of Experimental Physics of the Academy of Geneva. As a correspondent of the Académie royale des sciences he had written an article for the Encyclopedia on Friction in mechanics. In 1759 he lost his wife Isabelle André, whom he had married in 1752 and came from Marseille. In 1761 he was forced to resign from his professorship after a scandal (Vernes-Necker case). In 1762 with the help of his brother he was appointed in a trading house in Marseille and added to his last name de Germany, after the family estate near Rolle. He was dropped from the Académie des sciences's list of Corresponding Members in 1767.

In 1770 he moved to Paris. In 1772 he became a banker at Girardot Bank. In 1773 he remarried. Between 1774 and 1778 he must have been very busy collecting interest for his rich and noble clients in Utrecht, the Netherlands. An astonishing number of notarial deeds are in his name. In 1776 he became resident for the Republic of Geneva, succeeding his brother. When Emmanuel Haller was appointed in the Girardot bank in 1777, Louis became a silent partner. At some time (1777?) he became a friend of Benjamin Franklin. Jacques Necker was dismissed on 19 May 1781 as controller of the royal treasury. It seems the brothers were still cooperating as Jacques and Louis received annually 8 million livres as a pension.

As a result of changes during the liberal phase of the French Revolution, he thought it prudent to return to his homeland in 1791. The disgrace of his younger brother Jacques, who resigned in 1790, contributed to his decision. The Neckers were far from welcome in Geneva. Many of the French émigrés considered them Jacobins, and many of the Swiss Jacobins thought them conservative.

His son Jacques (1757-1825), who had joined the French army, married Albertine Necker de Saussure in 1785. The French Revolution ended his military career. In 1790, he began teaching as a demonstrator in botany at the Academy of Geneva as Professor of Botany.

== Works ==
- De Electricitate, 1747, in-4°; dans le Recueil de l’Académie (savants étrangers), vol. IV. He solved this problem: finding the curve on which a sliding body by its weight in vacuum, in any point of the curve that starts to descend, always arrives in an equal time to the lowest point, assuming the resistance from the friction as a specific part of the pressure felt by the body on the rope.
- Article « Forces & Frottement », in the volume VII of the Encyclopédie by Diderot and D’Alembert.

== Bibliography ==
- Ferdinand Hoefer, Nouvelle biographie générale, t. 37, Paris, Firmin-Didot, 1863, pp. 575–576
