= Madame de Staël as Corinne at Cape Miseno =

Painting by Elisabeth Louise Vigée Le Brun from 1807–1809

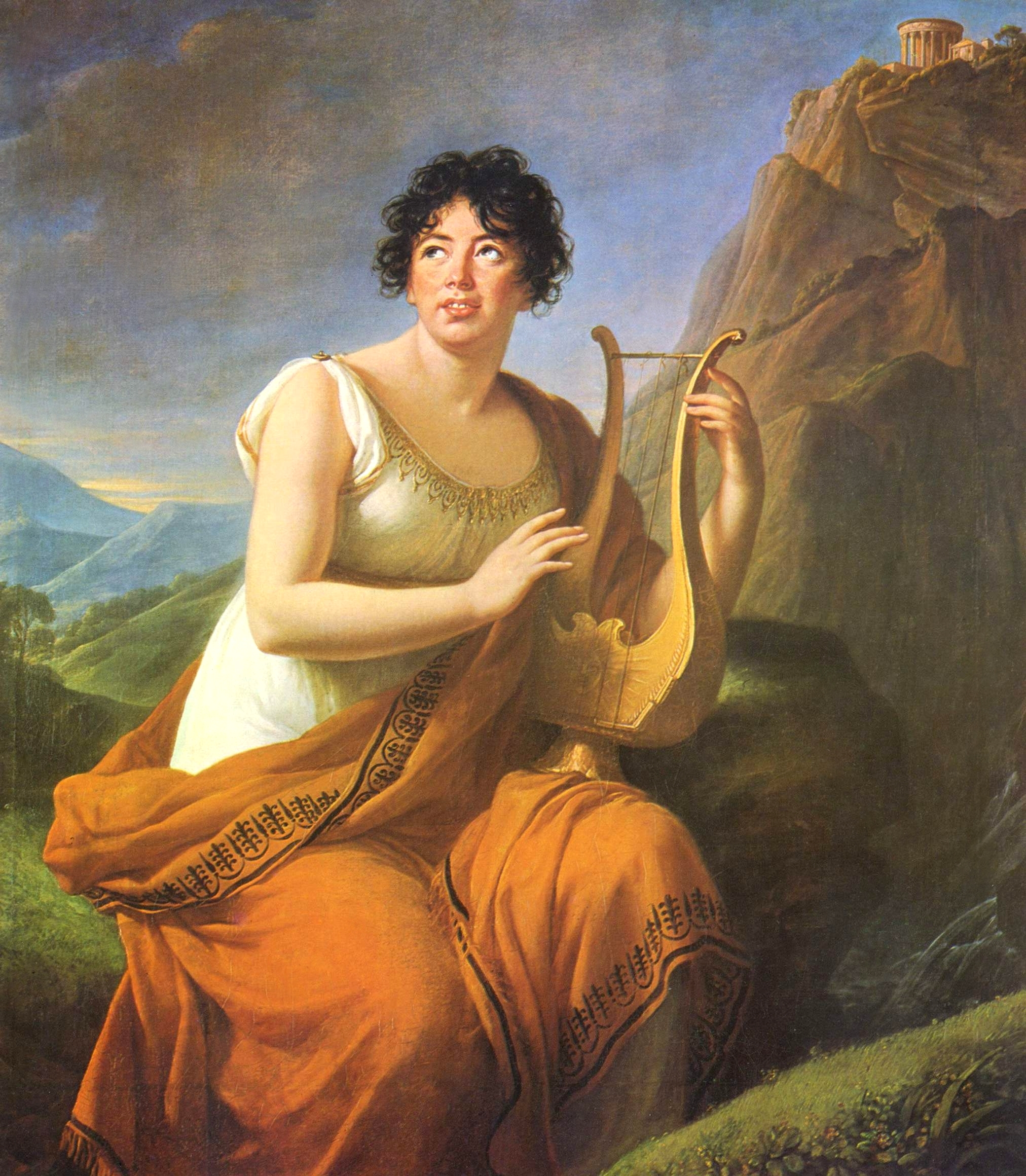
- Artist: Elisabeth Vigée Le Brun
- Year: 1807–1809
- Medium: Oil on canvas
- Dimensions: 140 cm × 118 cm (55 in × 46 in)
- Location: Musée d'Art et d'Histoire, Geneva

Madame de Staël as Corinne at Cape Miseno is a painting by the French artist Élisabeth Vigée Le Brun. It depicts Germaine de Staël and it is displayed in the collection of the Musée d'Art et d'Histoire, in Geneva. The work was completed between 1807 and 1809. The painting was commissioned by de Staël, who requested a painting showing the character Corinne from her novel Corinne, or Italy. The painting shows an innovative use of colour and a peculiar attention to the emotions of the subject. In the uniqueness of its technique, it challenges the conventions of the time regarding feminine sentimentalism.

== Historical background ==
Madame de Staël (Paris, April 22, 1766 - Paris, July 14, 1817) was a prominent woman of letters who, over time, had acquired great notoriety as a writer. After the death of her husband, Baron de Staël-Holstein (former ambassador of King Gustav III of Sweden to the court of France), she began a relationship with the liberal writer Benjamin Constant. Her critical views of Napoleon eventually led to her banishment from France. Unable to return to her home country, Madame de Staël lived in Coppet, on Lake Geneva, at the family castle.

The reading of the novel Corinne, or Italy by Madame de Staël, recently published at the time, deeply influenced Vigée Le Brun before her arrival in Coppet to depict the lady. The novel, full of autobiographical elements, tells the tragic love story between Corinne, an Italian poet and artist, and Lord Nelvil (Oswald), a Scottish nobleman traveling in Italy. Madame de Staël, a pioneer of modern female thought, through the character of Corinne outlines the image of an educated and independent woman who rejects the roles imposed by patriarchal society.

The artist did not complete the work at de Staël's castle. She finished it only after returning to Paris in 1809 and sent it to Switzerland in July. Madame de Staël refused to exhibit the portrait at the Salon and chose not to have it engraved by the artist Johann Gotthard von Müller. These decisions suggest a certain dissatisfaction with the work. Nevertheless, she maintained a cordial correspondence with Vigée Le Brun, attributing the decision not to have it engraved to financial difficulties caused by a "considerable legal trial."

== Description ==
Vigée Le Brun depicted Madame de Staël in the guise of Corinne. The protagonist is portrayed as she is about to sing for the last time in front of her beloved Oswald, before he marries her English stepsister Lucile. Madame de Staël, pictured while playing a golden lyre, has an inspired and focused look. Vigée Le Brun, according to her memoirs, cultivated this expression in her model through an unusual posing request: "I asked her to recite tragic verses (to which I hardly listened), so occupied was I painting her with an inspired look." Le Brun may have developed an interest in the subject of inspiration through the work of Giovanni Paisiello, who wrote about the topic in the preceding decade. One element of Le Brun's painting differentiates it from de Staël's novel: Cape Miseno. The Neapolitan hill is in fact replaced by the Temple of Tivoli and the waterfalls, apparently because de Staël herself requested the substitution.

== Later versions ==
Madame de Staël's dissatisfaction with the painting, evident in her refusal to exhibit the portrait at the Salon and to have it engraved, led to another version of the same portrait. The second painting came at request of her friend Prosper de Barante, who asked for a modified version with the aim of "toning down its rustic inspiration.” Firmin Massot created this second version. After Madame de Staël’s death, François Gérard painted Corinne at Cape Miseno (1819–22, Musée des Beaux-Arts, Lyon). Gérard managed to confer to the scene the solemnity and prestige typical of great historical painting.

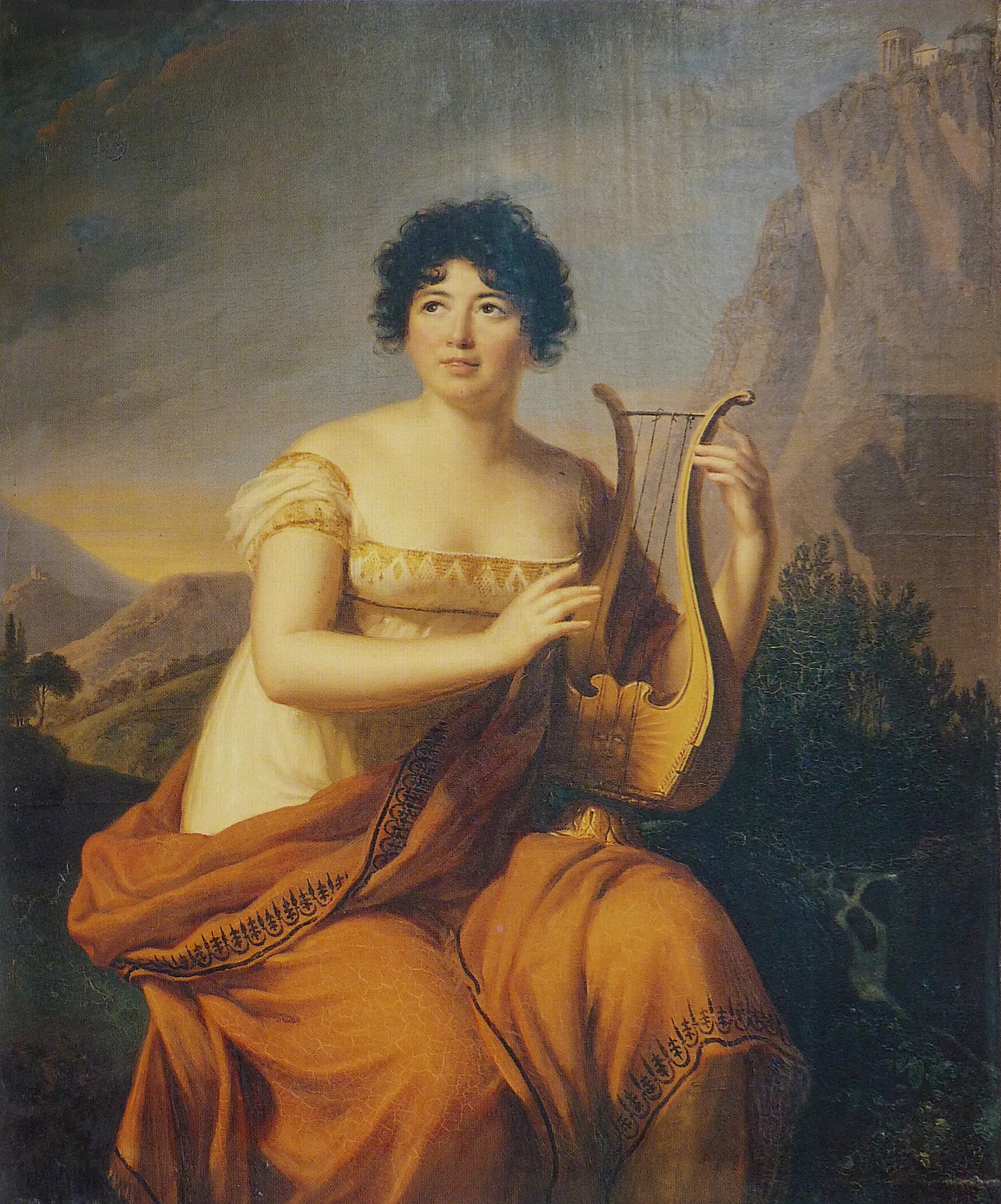
Madame de Staël as Corinne by Firmin Massot

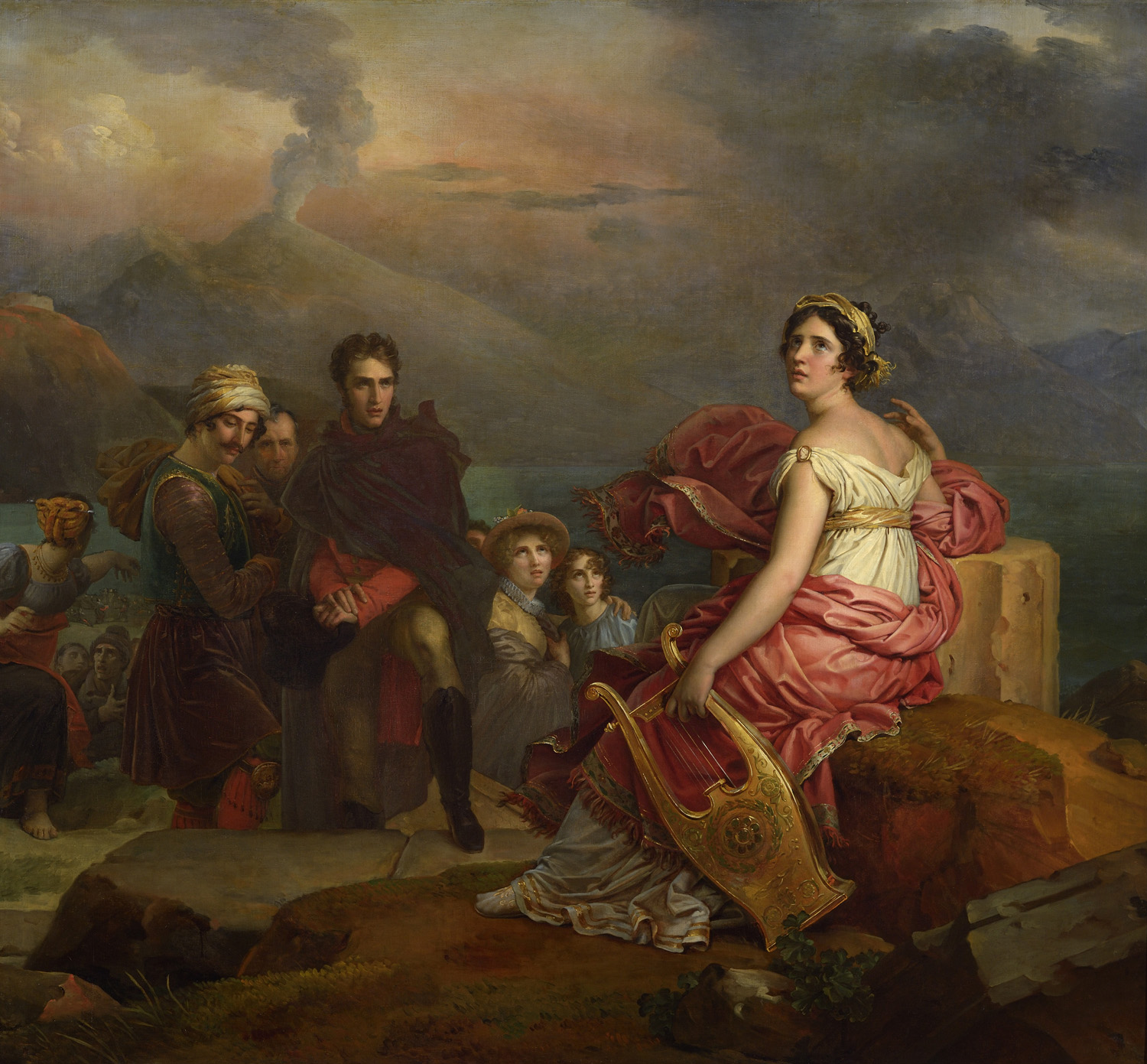
Corinne at Cape Misenum by François Gérard, 1819-1821

== Style ==
The painting is consistent with Vigée Le Brun's tendency to emphasize the temperament and expressive qualities of her sitters, going beyond physical appearance in order to convey personality, emotion, and state of mind. Such innovations were seen by many critics of the period as overly feminine, running counter to the growing emphasis that critics placed on themes of masculine heroism.
