= List of roads in Switzerland named after women =

This list shows the roads in Switzerland named after a woman, order by canton and by city.

== Geneva ==
Among more than 500 streets named after a person, only 21 are named after a woman.

Road	Person	Commune	Coordonates	Remarks
Rue De-Beaumont	Pauline Beaumont	Genève	46°11′51.39″N 6°9′21.03″E
Rue Marie-Brechbühl	Marie Brechbühl	Genève	46°13′1.42″N 6°7′35.08″E
Route Marie Curie	Marie Curie	Meyrin	?
Chemin Doctoresse-Champendal	Marguerite Champendal	Genève	46°11′31.76″N 6°10′0.27″E
Chemin Michée-Chauderon	Michée Chauderon	Genève	46°12′15.71″N 6°6′43.64″E
Rue Emilia-Cuchet-Albaret	Emilia Cuchet-Albaret	Vandœuvres	46°13′17.57″N 6°12′3.79″E
Avenue De-Gasparin	Valérie de Gasparin	Chêne-Bougeries	46°12′16.19″N 6°11′17.48″E
Rue Isabelle-Eberhardt	Isabelle Eberhardt	Genève	46°12′41.1″N 6°8′12.34″E
Chemin de la Comtesse-Eldegarde		Satigny	46°12′57.97″N 6°1′45.19″E
Chemin Girod-de-l’Ain	Émilie Girod de l’Ain	Versoix	46°16′57.55″N 6°9′23.62″E
Rue Émilie-Gourd	Emilie Gourd	Genève	46°11′52.7″N 6°9′8.75″E
Rue Emma-Kammacher	Emma Kammacher	Meyrin	46°13′24.33″N 6°4′15.44″E
Chemin De-La-Rochefoucauld	Sophie-Félécité de la Rochefoucauld	Versoix	46°17′32.51″N 6°10′4.4″E
Chemin Ella-Maillart	Ella Maillart	Genève	?
Rue Munier-Romilly	Amélie Munier-Romilly	Genève	46°11′52.22″N 6°9′12.03″E
Ruelle de la Mère-Elise	?	Meinier	46°14′11.45″N 6°13′0.23″E
Chemin Isabelle-Nef	Isabelle Nef	Collex-Bossy	46°16′40.69″N 6°6′50.49″E
Rue Gabrielle-Perret-Gentil	Gabrielle Perret-Gentil	Genève	46°11′38.9″N 6°8′54.69″E
Avenue Peschier	Catherine Peschier	Genève	46°11′30.85″N 6°9′26.9″E
Chemin De-Riencourt	Antoinette-Caroline de Riencourt	Bellevue	46°15′11.83″N 6°8′49.96″E
Rue Royaume	Mère Royaume	Genève	46°12′46.5″N 6°8′45.38″E
Rue Madame-De-Staël	Germaine de Staël	Genève	46°12′26.72″N 6°8′5.45″E
Avenue De-Warens	Françoise-Louise de Warens	Genève	46°12′13.68″N 6°7′29.56″E
Route Wu	Chien-Shiung Wu	Meyrin	?

== Neuchâtel ==
Road	Person	Commune	Coordonates	Remarkes
Boucle de Cydalise	Cydalise Nicolet	La Chaux-de-Fonds	47°6′44.13″N 6°49′51.16″E
Chaussée Isabelle-de-Charrière	Isabelle de Charrière	Neuchâtel	46°58′52.35″N 6°53′59.2″E
Rue Jeanne-de-Hochberg	Jeanne de Hochberg	Neuchâtel	46°59′26.99″N 6°55′22.09″E
Rue Marie-de-Nemours	Marie de Nemours	Neuchâtel	46°59′53.71″N 6°56′54.07″E
Rue Monique Saint-Hélier	Monique Saint-Hélier	La Chaux-de-Fonds	47°6′14.11″N 6°50′21.37″E
Rue Sophie-Mairet	Sophie Mairet	La Chaux-de-Fonds	47°6′44.39″N 6°49′53.75″E

== Vaud ==
In Lausanne, only 3 streets are named after a woman, while 97,2% are named after a man.

Road	Person	Commune	Coordonates	Remarks
avenue Maria-Belgia	Maria Belgia de Portugal	Lausanne	46°30′42.85″N 6°38′2.84″E
quai Maria-Belgia	Maria Belgia de Portugal	Vevey	46°27′36.8″N 6°50′13.56″E
rue Jenny Enning	Jenny Enning	Lausanne	46°31′12.38″N 6°38′14.23″E
Chemin Isabelle de Montolieu	Isabelle de Montolieu	Lausanne	46°32′24.71″N 6°38′55.99″E
Rue Françoise Perret	Françoise Perret	Yverdon	46°46′15.79″N 6°38′13″E

== Zürich ==
Road	Person	Commune	Coordonates	Remarks
Therese-Giehse-Strasse	Therese Giehse
Maria-Stader-Weg	Maria Stader
Annemarie-Schwarzenbach-Weg	Annemarie Schwarzenbach
Ellen-Widmann-Weg	Ellen Widmann
Elsa-Cavelti-Weg	Elsa Cavelti
Else-Lasker-Schüler-Weg	Else Lasker-Schüler
Ricarda-Huch-Strasse	Ricarda Huch
Meret-Oppenheim-Weg	Méret Oppenheim
Erika-Mann-Strasse	Erika Mann
Sophie-Taeuber-Strasse	Sophie Taeuber-Arp
Mascha-Kaléko-Weg	Mascha Kaléko
Marie-Heim-Vögtlin-Weg	Marie Heim-Vögtlin
Lux-Guyer-Weg	Lux Guyer
Caroline-Farner-Weg	Caroline Farner
Marie-Baum-Weg	Marie Baum
Margrit-Rainer-Strasse	Margrit Rainer
Emilie-Kempin-Spyri-Weg	Emilie Kempin-Spyri
Heidi-Abel-Weg	Heidi Abel
Anna-Heer-Strasse	Anna Heer
Sophie-Albrecht-Weg	Sophie Albrecht
Else-Züblin-Weg	Else Züblin-Spiller
Else-Züblin-Strasse	Else Züblin-Spiller
Rosa-Bloch-Weg	Rosa Bloch-Bollag
Gertrud-Kurz-Strasse	Gertrud Kurz
Helen-Keller-Strasse	Helen Keller
Ida-Bindschedler-Strasse	Ida Bindschedler
Marie-Meierhofer-Weg	Marie Meierhofer
Regina-Kägi-Strasse	Regina Kägi-Fuchsmann
Engelstrasse	Regula Engel
Orelliweg	Susanna Orelli-Rinderknecht
Orellistrasse	Susanna Orelli-Rinderknecht
Verena-Conzett-Strasse	Verena Conzett
Nettie-Sutro-Strasse	Nettie Sutro
Eleonorenstrasse	Eleonore Cramer-Mylius
Agnes-Robmann-Weg	Agnes Robmann
Anna-Häuptli-Weg	Anna Häuptli
Cordelia-Guggenheim-Weg	Cordelia Guggenheim
Dora-Staudinger-Strasse	Dora Staudinger
Laura-Hezner-Weg	Laura Hezner
Regulastrasse	Regula
Piazza Cella	Erminia Cella
