= Nancy Mérienne =

Swiss painter (1793–1860)

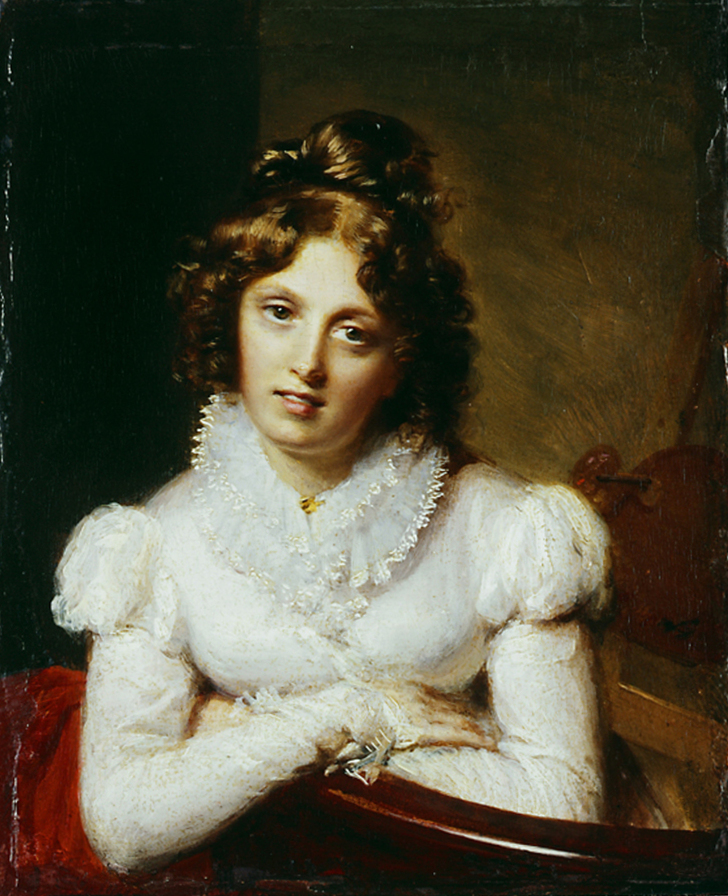
- Nancy Mérienne by Firmin Massot
- Born: Anne Antoinette Soiron; 4 April 1793; Geneva, Switzerland
- Died: 6 October 1860 (aged 67); Plainpalais, Switzerland
- Occupation: Painter
- Known for: Portraiture

Anne Antoinette Soiron, known as Nancy Mérienne (4 April 1793 in Geneva – 6 October 1860 (in Plainpalais)), was a 19th-century Swiss painter, known for her portraits of celebrities and nobility. She was considered "highly esteemed in her time."

== Biography ==
Nancy Mérienne was born on 4 April 1793 in Geneva, Switzerland, to Jean-Pierre Soiron, a watchmaker and his wife, Suzanne Elisabeth Aimée Soiron. She led a discreet life and devoted herself to her art. She was known to travel to Switzerland, France and London, England. She remained single all her life and suffered from a hearing problem.

Mérienne was a student of the painter Firmin Massot. Although she was known to paint bouquets of flowers and historical scenes, she primarily produced portraits, both painted and drawn (in oil, watercolor, pastel, pencil and using stump drawing).

She was well-connected among Geneva's upper-class clientele and became a popular artist. She created several portraits of George Sand and her children (Maurice and Solange), and she drew a young Franz Liszt during his stay in Geneva in 1836. She also painted portraits of Tsar Alexander II and Tsar Nicholas I and worked for other Russian nobility.

Firmin Massot painted the only known portrait of Mérienne in 1825. In 1846, Mérienne painted his portrait in return. Both works can now be found in the Museum of Art and History in Geneva.

== Selected awards ==
- Silver medal at the Bern Salon of 1830

== Exhibitions ==
- Salon of the Society of Arts, Geneva, 1820
- Salon of the Society of Arts, Geneva, 1823
- Exhibition of the Society of Friends of Fine Arts, Geneva, 1825
- Geneva Salon, 1826
- Bern Salon, 1830
- Geneva Salon, 1832
- Geneva Salon, 1837
- Lyon Salon, France, 1837
- Geneva Salon, 1849

== Public collections ==
- Museum of Art and History, Geneva: Portrait of the painter Firmin Massot, 1846; Portrait of Abraham Constantin, 1850; Portrait of Tsar Nicholas I, 1853; Portrait of Mademoiselle Cécile Revilliod, 1855; Portrait of Madame Ariane Revilliod; Young Unknown Woman with a Watch
- Ariana Museum Geneva: owns 13 works
- Library of the Geneva Conservatory of Music: Portrait of Franz Liszt, 1836
- Museum of Romantic Life, Paris: Portrait of Maurice and Solange Sand, 1836
- Cantonal Museum of Fine Arts, Lausanne

== Selected works ==
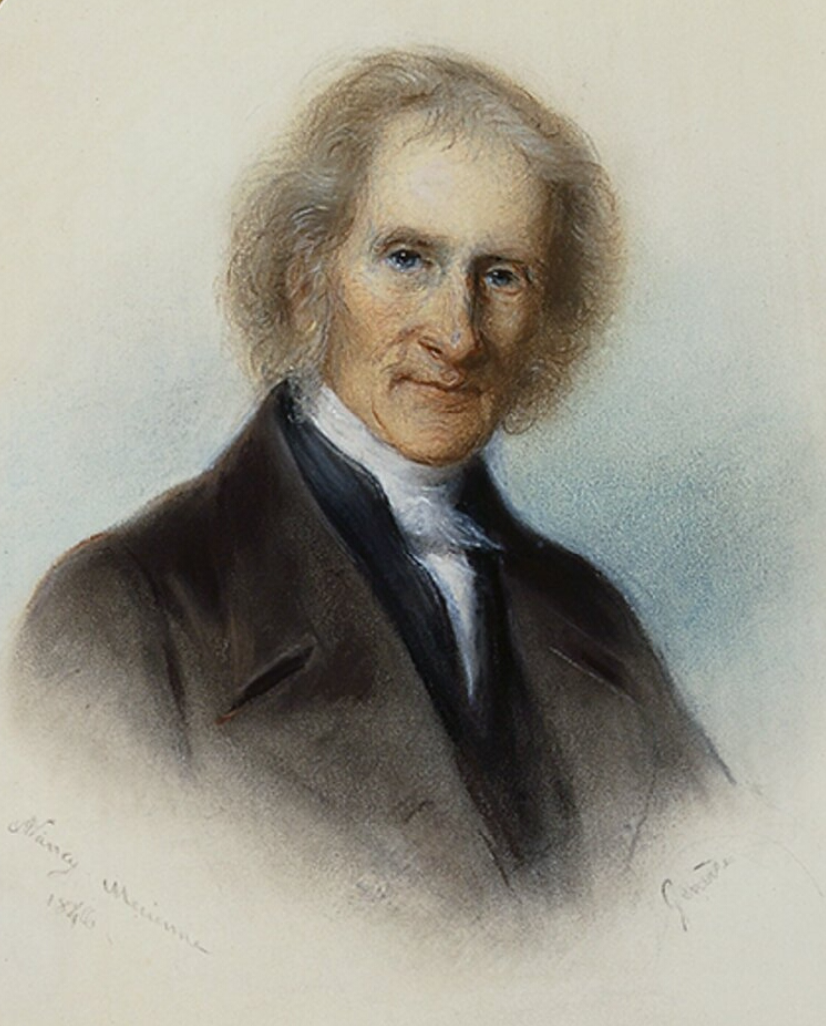
Firmin Massot

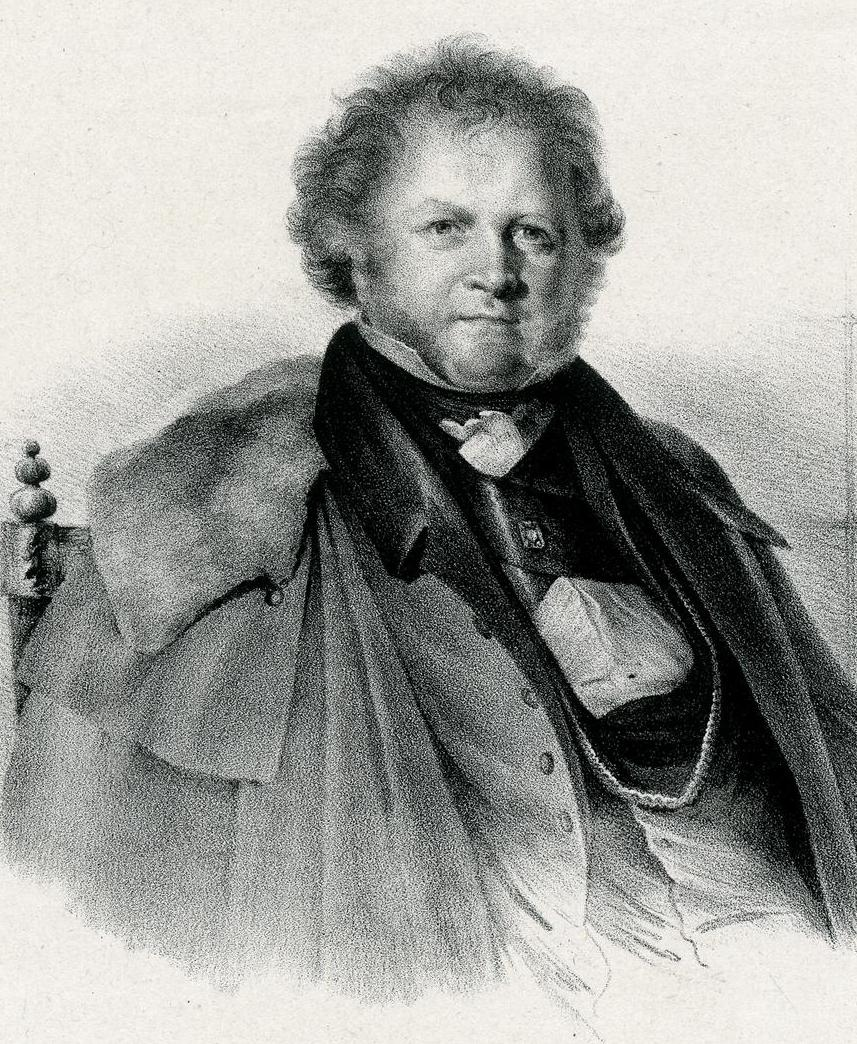
J. J. de Sellon

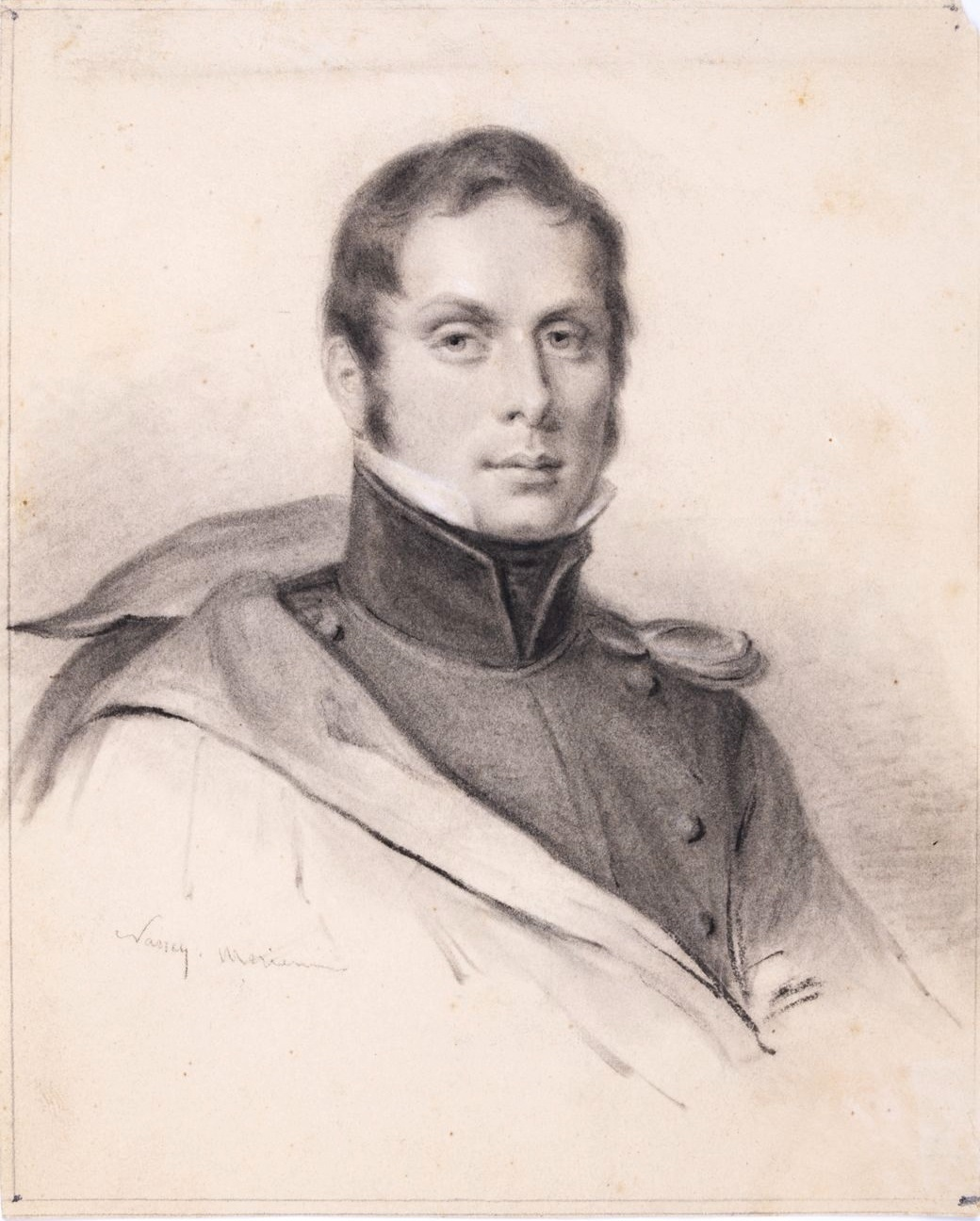
Stanisław Rzewuski

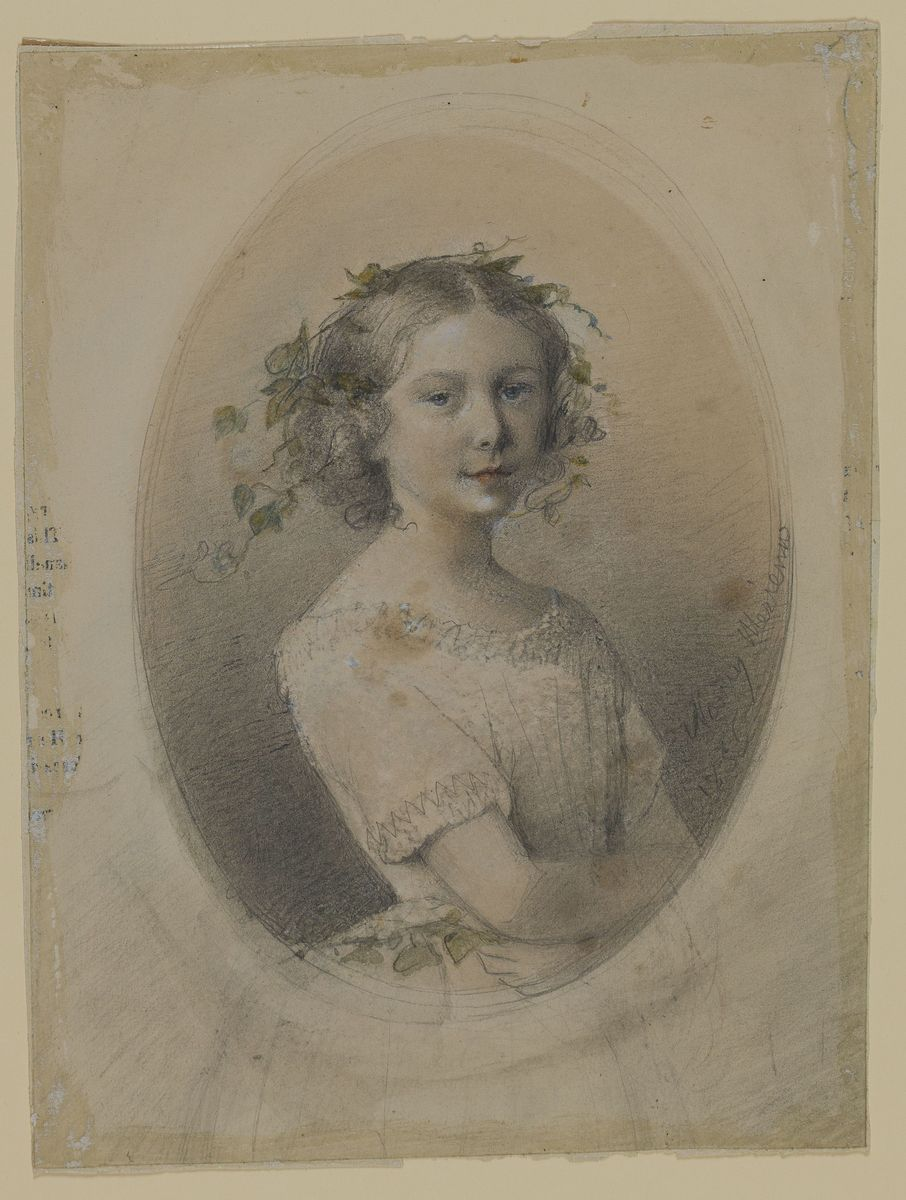
Mademoiselle Cécile Revilliod
