= Corinne, or Italy =

1807 novel by Germaine de Staël

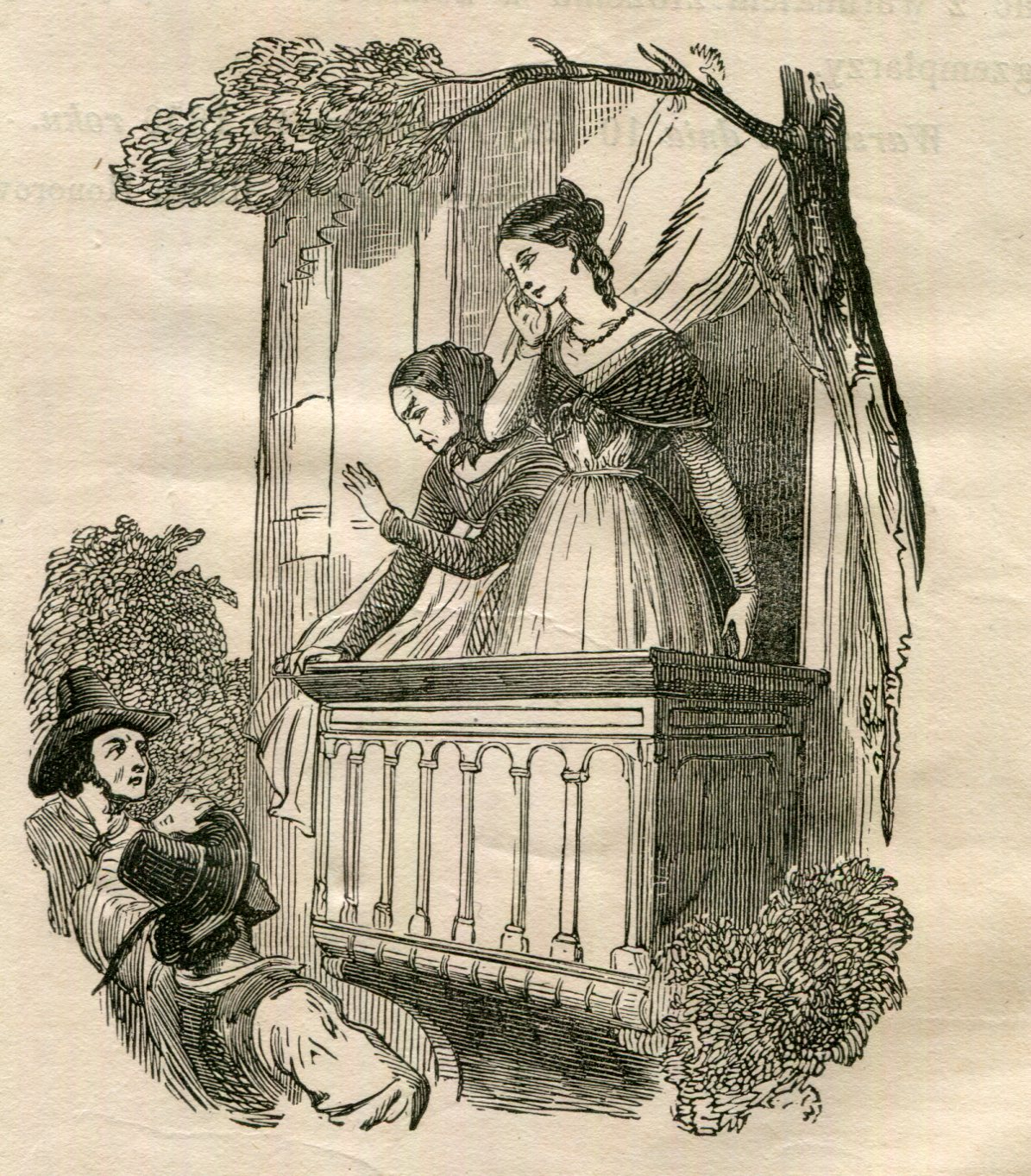
- Lady Edgermond sends away the Italian musicians, whose music reminds Corinne of Italy. Engraving by G. Staal for an 1857 reprint.
- Author: Germaine de Staël
- Original title: Corinne ou l'Italie
- Language: French
- Publication date: 1807
- Publication place: France

Corinne, or Italy (French: Corinne ou l'Italie), also known as Corinne, is a novel by the Genevan and French writer Germaine de Staël, published in 1807. It relates a love story between an Italian poet, Corinne, and Lord Oswald Nelvil, an English nobleman. The novel includes both observations and reflections on Italy, its history, its culture and the customs of its inhabitants. Influenced by Enlightenment thought, the novel is part of the French Romanticism movement. The novel is Madame de Staël's most famous work, and is the first aesthetic romance not written in German.

== Background to the book ==
Madame de Staël had been interested in Italy for a long time, notably through friendships with Italian artists, diplomats or political refugees and by what she was told by several of her close friends who had travelled there, including Charles Victor de Bonstetten, Jean Charles Léonard de Sismondi, and Wilhelm von Humboldt. In 1802 she considered going on a trip there, but ultimately opted for Germany which attracted her more immediately for its intellectual and political activity. Shortly after being exiled from France by Napoleon in October 1803 due to her barely disguised political opposition to the First Empire, she began her book On Germany (French: De l'Allemagne). But at the beginning of February 1804, she attended a performance of the opera La Saalnix: the opera tells the story of the impossible love between a nymph and a knight, who abandons her upon discovering her to be immortal and therefore too superior to him, and who prefers to marry a simple mortal. De Staël then conceived an idea for a novel which led her to interrupt the preparation of On Germany to begin writing Corinne, or Italy.

As part of her preparatory work for Corinne, Madame de Staël made a trip to Italy starting in December 1804. The sequence of her travels in Italy partly inspires the stages of Corinne's and Oswald's journey. Travelling in the company of her three children and their tutor August Wilhelm Schlegel, she visited Rome; Turin, where her friend the Swiss historian de Sismondi joined her; Milan, where she spent around twenty days with the then-famous poet Vincenzo Monti; then she crossed the Marches, Ancona and Loreto before arriving in Rome during a flood of the Tiber on 3 February 1805, where she stayed for two weeks. Madame de Staël then enthusiastically visited Campania, the coast, Vesuvius and Naples, before returning to Rome on 13 March, where she attended the celebrations of Holy Week. In May, she visited Florence and Venice, before returning to Milan at the beginning of June and then returning to Switzerland to her château, Coppet Castle. Throughout the trip, Madame de Staël accumulated travel notes in several notebooks, parts of which have been preserved: she was interested in landscapes and monuments as well as in the Italians and their customs, and she recorded many ideas which she used later. Several episodes of the novel are inspired by events that she actually witnessed: an English warship in the Bay of Naples, an epidemic of plague which raged not far from where she travelled, and carnivals and religious ceremonies.

== Plot ==
Corinne, or Italy is divided into twenty books, which are themselves divided into chapters.

=== Book I: Oswald ===
The plot begins in the winter of 1794 to 1795. Lord Oswald Nelvil, a Scottish peer, travels to Italy on the advice of his doctors and friends in order to overcome health problems caused in part by a painful bereavement, the death of his father. Oswald considers himself guilty of his father's death, because he caused him serious worry for reasons that are not stated in detail at the beginning of the novel, and he did not know how to reach him in time to reassure him and obtain his forgiveness before his death. Haunted by his grief and his guilt, Oswald struggles to regain a taste for life. Enlisted in the army, he awaits the mobilisation of his regiment, which does not come, and he resolves to travel to Italy in the meantime. He first meets the Comte d'Erfeuil, a Frenchman who emigrated to flee the French Revolution. Witty and very talkative, Comte d'Erfeuil distracts Oswald a little from his melancholy, although he gradually reveals himself to be quite selfish. Both travel to Italy and reach Rome in dreary and gloomy weather.

=== Book II: Corinne at the Capitolium ===
The next day, when he wakes up, Oswald finds the city celebrating: they are preparing to crown the poet Corinne, the most famous artist in the country, at the Capitoline Hill. Intrigued, Oswald goes to the festive ceremony and unexpectedly becomes passionate about the poet and her poetry, because her talent is dazzling.

=== Book III: Corinne ===
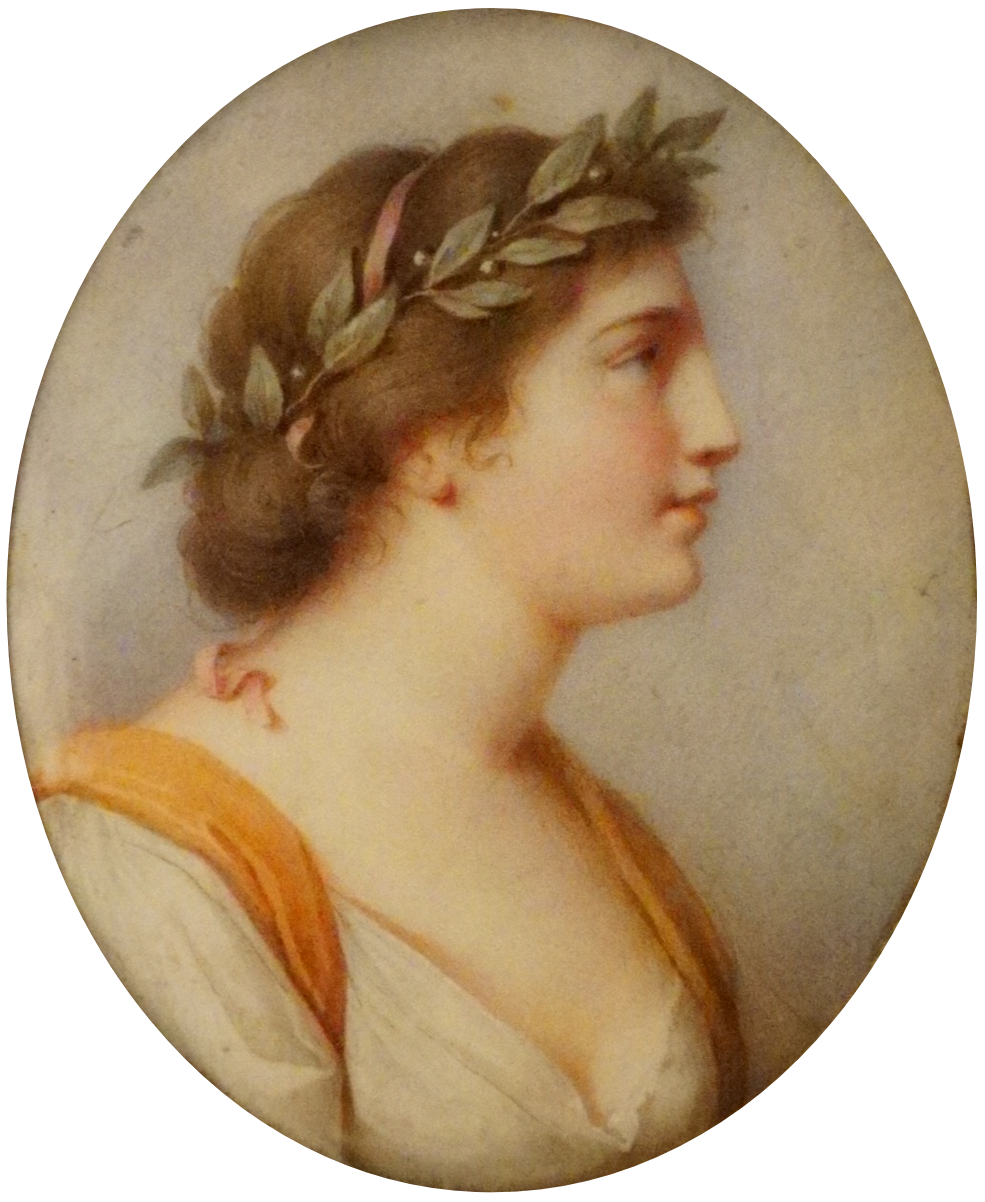
Portrait of the heroine Corinne, by Louis-Ami Arlaud-Jurine (c. 1807), Museo Correr, Venice.

Thanks to Erfeuil, Oswald is able to meet Corinne in the literary salon she holds at her home in Rome. He also meets Prince Castel-Forte, Corinne's best friend. Corinne takes an interest in Oswald. The Comte d'Erfeuil, a little jealous of their proximity at the beginning, quickly loses interest in the poet. Oswald hears Corinne improvising at home for her friends and finds himself more and more drawn to her, despite his English expectation that women should not lead this kind of life and must maintain more reserve.

=== Books IV to X: Visits in Rome ===
Corinne offers to show Oswald around Rome and the two exchange their thoughts on Italy, England and the differences between these two countries. They fall in love, but each seems to have deep reasons for fearing their own feelings, which prevent them from being happy.

=== Books XI to XIII: The stay in Naples and the story of Oswald ===
Corinne and Oswald leave to stay a few days in Naples, where they visit the city and the surrounding countryside. Oswald struggles to overcome the loss of his father and is haunted by the idea that he would have disapproved of Oswald's love. Corinne, for her part, wants to maintain the free, independent life devoted to the arts that she managed to build in Rome, and she dreads the prospect of going to England with Oswald, with the risk of having to comply with English demands towards married women, expected to devote themselves to domestic tasks.

Little by little, Oswald and Corinne reveal themselves to each other and explain the secrets which risk separating them. Oswald confides his story to Corinne: in the past, during a stay in France, he fell in love with a young French woman, Madame d'Arbigny. The latter, although animated by sincere feelings towards him, resorted to tricks to manipulate him in order to keep him in France, including after the start of the Revolution which made Lord Nelvil's position perilous. When Oswald was called back to England by his father and sensed that he had serious health problems, Madame d'Arbigny told him that she was pregnant. Oswald was about to marry her out of honour, when he quarreled with a friend and suitor of Madame d'Arbigny, Comte Raimond, an immoral character who ended up throwing the truth in his face: she and he had been manipulating Oswald since the beginning. Oswald and the Comte fought a duel, Oswald wounded the Comte and left for England. Unfortunately, in the meantime his father had died, and hence the guilt that has pursued Oswald since these events. Oswald also reveals to Corinne that his father had advised him to marry the daughter of one of his friends, Lucile Edgermond. This revelation makes a strong impression on Corinne.

Corinne and Oswald then walk in the surroundings of Vesuvius. The crater and the spectacle of lava give Corinne a bad feeling.

=== Books XIV and XV: The trip to Venice, the story of Corinne and the departure of Oswald ===
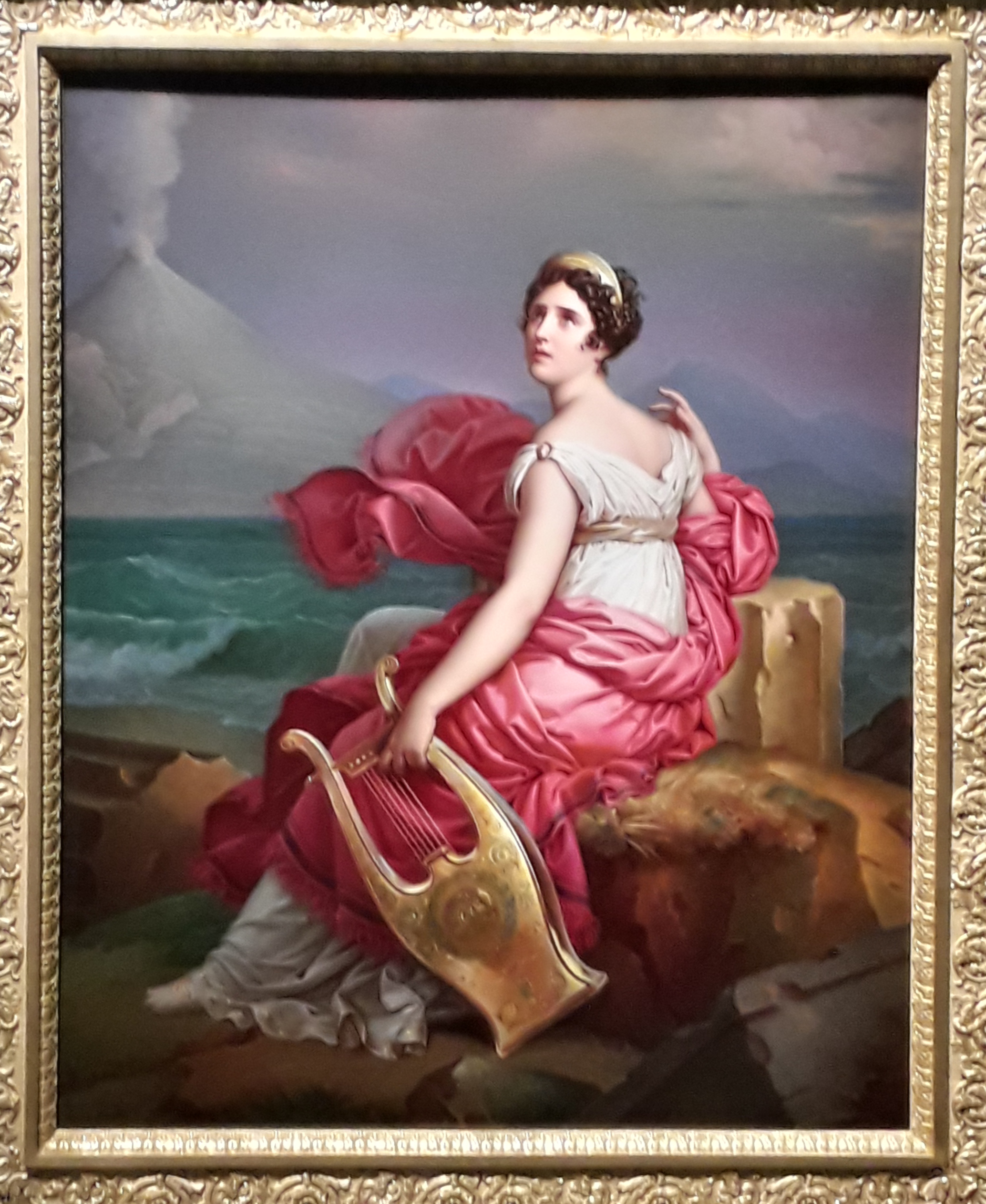
Marie-Victoire Jaquotot, Corinne at Cape Misenum (after François Gérard), 1825. Painting on porcelain. Sèvres factory.

Corinne, in turn, reveals her story in writing to Oswald. She is actually the sister of Lucile Edgermond. She grew up in Italy before being taken away to live with Lord Edgermond's new wife. The latter was often absent and took little care of his children. Lady Edgermond did everything possible to cut Corinne from her Italian ties and to prevent her from exercising her artistic talents, because she was convinced that an English woman must devote herself exclusively to the maintenance of her house and the well-being of her husband. Corinne was wasting away and bored to death in the remote English countryside, where she found life monotonous and hollow. After four years, Corinne's and Lady Edgermond's relationship reached a critical stage, to the point where Corinne let it slip that she wanted to run away to live an independent life. Lady Edgermond then told her that she had complete freedom since she is rich, but that she should pass for dead in order to protect her family from the public shame inspired by such a life as an artistic woman. Indignant, Corinne ended up carrying out her escape plan, with the help of her servant Thérésine. She pretended to be dead, sailed to Italy and adopted a name inspired by the ancient Greek poet Corinna. Corinne finally reveals to Oswald that his own father had thought of her as a future wife for his son, but that at the time he ended up changing his mind in favour of Lucile. Oswald declares that sooner or later he will have to return to England in order to understand the reasons which led his late father not to want to give him to Corinne in marriage, and that, depending on the strength of these reasons, he will comply or not with the opinion of his father. In the meantime, he promises to stay with Corinne for at least three months.

On the way back to Rome, Oswald and Corinne are more in love with each other than ever. He is several times on the verge of proposing to Corinne, and he swears to never abandon her. Corinne, asked to participate in an opera buffa, La Fille de l'air, draws on her happiness to play the character of a charming and all-powerful fairy. But during the show, Oswald receives the order to mobilise his regiment in England. He also learns that word of his relationship with Corinne has reached England and that malicious rumours are circulating about the poet. Both are desperate, but Corinne finally comes to terms with Oswald's departure.

=== Book XVI: Oswald in England ===
Back in England, Oswald, Lord Nelvil finds his regiment immobilised because its departure had been postponed without a precise date. Unable to occupy himself otherwise, he goes to the Edgermond home to convince Lady Edgermond to no longer let Corinne pass for dead and to recognise her as her daughter. On this occasion he sees Lucile Edgermond again, whose beauty and shyness charm him. Lady Edgermond completely rejects Oswald's requests and tells him that a letter from his father, in which he explained the reasons why he did not want Corinne as Oswald's wife, had been given to a former friend of his father, Mr. Dickson. Leaving the Edgermond estate, Oswald sees Lucile who observes him surreptitiously and is emotionally stirred. Shortly after, going for a walk in the forest, he meets Mr. Dickson. The latter makes him read the letter in which Oswald's father analysed the characters of the two Edgermond girls and judged that of Lucile more appropriate to Oswald than that of Corinne: he feared that Corinne would never be able to be happy in England and would make Oswald move away from his homeland. Upset, Oswald sees Lady Edgermond and Lucile several times and ends up abandoning his intended marriage to Corinne, but without wanting to marry Lucile: he is determined to remain single for the moment. He continues to demand that Lady Edgermond recognise Corinne as her living daughter.

=== Book XVII: Corinne in Scotland ===
Oswald writes several times to Corinne, who senses his hesitation through his letters. Devoured by absence and anxiety, she ends up hastily embarking for England, sensing that this trip will bring her no comfort. She sees him several times in the company of Lady and Lucile Edgermond, first at the opera, then during a military parade. Oswald's looks at and attention to Lucile convince Corinne that he has forgotten her to the benefit of his sister and she begins to despair, especially since she does not wish to compete in love with her own younger sister, to whom she was practically a mother during her childhood. She places the ring that Oswald gave her in an envelope and writes only the words You are free in order to free him from any commitment to her, but she does not yet dare to give him the letter. Corinne follows Oswald to Scotland to the Edgermond estate, where Lady Edgermond is giving a ball which Oswald opens by dancing with Lucile. Mortified, Corinne is several times on the verge of showing herself to Oswald but never dares. She observes Lucile meditating at their father's grave and decides to step aside in her favour. She has the letter containing the ring delivered to Oswald, entrusting it to a blind old man so that Oswald would not know that she had come to Scotland. Meanwhile, Oswald, without news of Corinne who has not written since her arrival in England, believes he has been forgotten and gradually falls in love with Lucile.

=== Book XVIII: The stay in Florence ===
Plunged into an abyss of grief, Corinne embarks for Italy and stays alone in Florence, where she is joined by her friend Prince Castel-Forte, who is unable to console her. She visits the monuments of Florence and the gallery where Michelangelo's sculptures are exhibited, but only sees it as additional fuel for her sadness. She despairs and her strength declines; she is no longer able to find her former artistic inspiration and only writes scattered, plaintive fragments.

=== Book XIX: Oswald's return to Italy ===
Oswald marries Lucile Edgermond, then leaves for the islands with his regiment where he distinguishes himself for four years by great bravery. In the meantime, Lucile gives birth to a daughter, Juliette, who looks a lot like Corinne. Oswald finally returns safely to Lucile, but they do not express their emotions and thoughts frankly towards each other. Oswald finds Lucile cold and distant, even though she loves him but has been educated to show little of her emotions. As Oswald encounters health problems, his doctors again advise him to take a trip to Italy, which Lucile accepts, much to Oswald's surprise. He cannot shake the desire to see Corinne again and the disturbing news he learns about her reinforces his conviction. During a visit to the Bologna Gallery, Lucile makes Oswald understand that she knows more than he thinks about his relationship with Corinne, and Oswald promises to never abandon her despite his remaining feelings for Corinne.

=== Book XX: Conclusion ===
Oswald learns from Prince Castel-Forte that Corinne is seriously ill. However, she refuses to see him, but asks to see their daughter. Corinne spends her last weeks instructing Juliette as if to pass on her talents in poetry, music, drawing and Italian. Exasperated by the influence that Corinne maintains over Oswald and Juliette, Lucile goes to see her with the intention of ordering her to break all contact with them; but, won over by Corinne's superior temperament, Lucile concedes and the two sisters are reconciled. Corinne resolves to give a final poetic performance, no longer an improvisation since she no longer has the strength, but a song based on her latest writings. Oswald, Lucile and Juliette attend with emotion. Corinne dies shortly after. Oswald attends her funeral, then returns to live with Lucile.

== Later influence ==
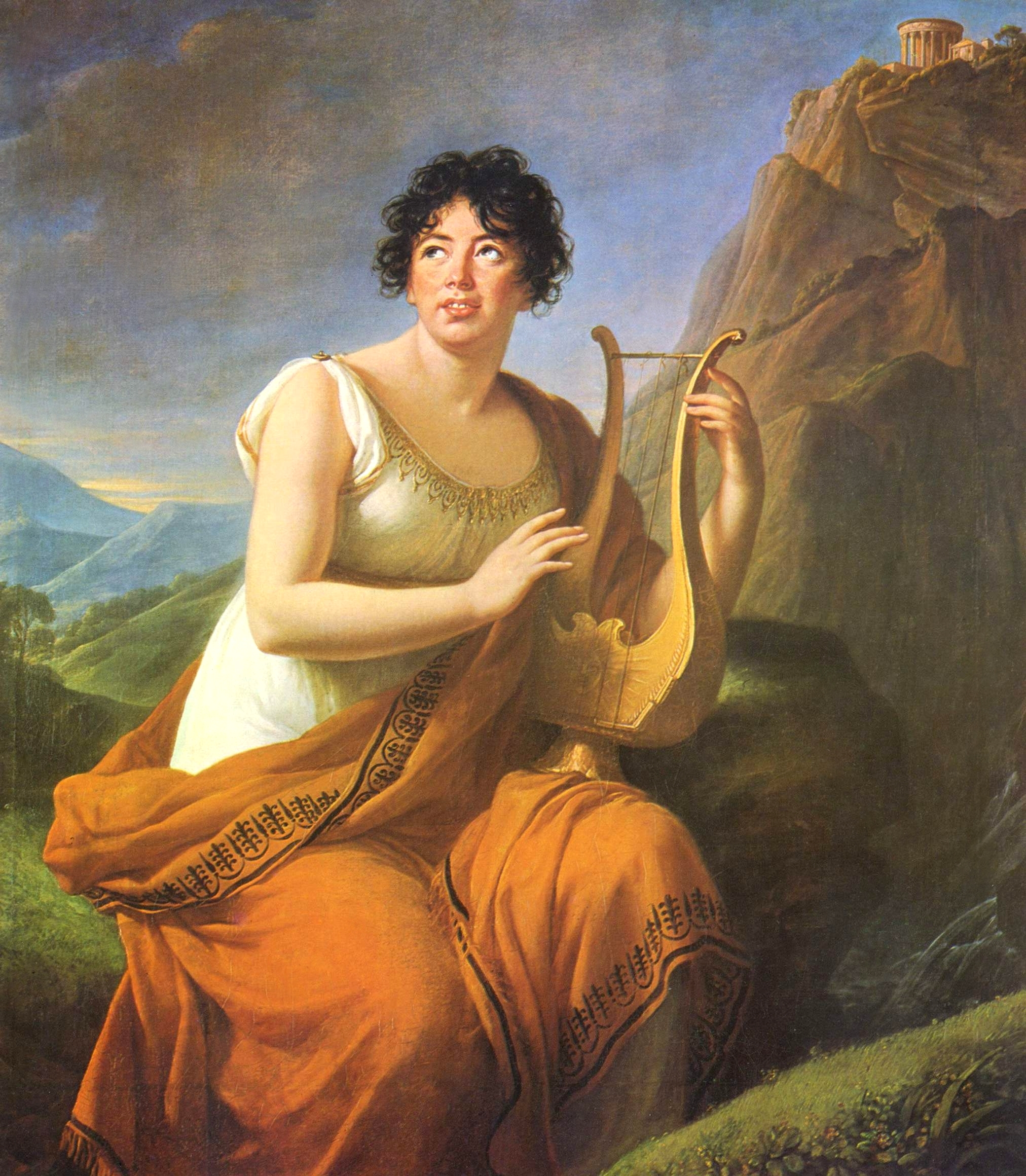
Portrait of Madame de Staël as Corinne, by Élisabeth Vigée Le Brun (c. 1808-1809). Musée d'Art et d'Histoire (Geneva).

=== Literature ===
Corinne influenced several later authors, including the British poet and essayist Elizabeth Barrett Browning (1806–1861) and Felicia Hemans, who included her poem "Corinna at the Capitol" in The Literary Souvenir, 1827. In addition to her metrical translations of the odes for Isabel Hill's translation of the novel (first published 1833), Letitia Elizabeth Landon wrote the poem "Corinne at the Cape of Misena" for The Amulet, 1832.

=== Painting ===
Several paintings painted at the beginning of the 19th century were inspired by Corinne. Élisabeth Vigée Le Brun painted Madame de Staël as Corinne around 1808–1809. The French painter François Gérard painted a portrait between 1819 and 1821 inspired by the novel and entitled Corinne at Cape Misenum, showing the author of the novel, Madame de Staël, dressed as Corinne.

=== Music ===
In 1825, the Italian composer Gioachino Rossini composed an opera buffa entitled Il viaggio a Reims (The Journey to Reims), on a libretto by Luigi Balocchi, the subject of which is inspired by the novel by Madame de Staël. The opera was premiered on 19 June 1825 at the Théâtre-Italien in Paris.

== Bibliography ==
- de Staël, Mme. Germaine (1985). "Preface". In Balayé, Simone (ed.). Corinne ou l'Italie (in French) (2018, reprint in the collection "Folio classique" n°1632 ed.). Paris: Éditions Gallimard. ISBN 978-2-07-037632-2.
- de Staël, Mme. Germaine (2000). Balayé, Simone (ed.). Œuvres complètes, série II. Œuvres littéraires, tome III. Corinne ou l'Italie (in French) (collection "Textes de littérature moderne et contemporaine" ed.). Paris: Honoré Champion.

=== Audiobook ===
- Corinne ou l'Italie, read by Françoise Fabian, Éditions des Femmes, 1984 (CD).

=== Scholarly works and articles ===
- Harriman-Smith, James (2015). "Une tragédie possible : Corinne, ou l'Italie et Roméo et Juliette". Études françaises (in French). 15 (1): 125–140. doi:10.7202/1028525ar.
- Lafrance, Geneviève (2006). "De la reconnaissance comme aveu:anagnorisis et sacrifice mémoriel dans Corinne ou l'Italie de Mme de Staël". SVEC (in French). 12: 261–267. ISBN 0-7294-0886-8. ISSN 0435-2866.
- Lafrance, Geneviève (2007). "Une "innocente ruse" de Corinne? Histoire et stratégie d'oubli chez Mme de Staël". Annales Benjamin-Constant (in French). 31–32: 177–188.
- Corinne ou l’Italie de madame de Staël, poétique et politique, Éditions du temps, 1999.
- Jean-Pierre Perchellet, Un deuil éclatant du bonheur. Corinne ou l'Italie de Madame de Staël, Orléans, Paradigme, 1999.
- Rosset, François (2000). "Poétique des nations dans Corinne". In Planté, Christine; Pouzoulet, Christine; Vaillant, Alain (eds.). Une mélodie intellectuelle: Corinne ou l'Italie de Germaine de Staël (in French). Montpellier: Université Paul Valéry. pp. 139–158. ISBN 978-2842693794.
- Simone, F. (1970). "La littérature italienne dans Corinne". Madame de Staël et l'Europe. Colloque de Coppet (18-24 juillet 1966) organisé pour la célébration du deuxième centenaire de la naissance de Mme de Staël (in French). Paris: Klincksieck. pp. 289–300. ASIN B017SRMBPY.
- Wehle, Winfried (2010). "Trauma et Éruption : La Littérature comme mise en scène de l'inconscient. Réflexions sur Corinne ou l'Italie de Madame de Staël" (PDF). Revue d'histoire littéraire de la France: Revue trimestrielle (in French) (110): 35–64. doi:10.3917/rhlf.101.0035.
