= Jeanne-Pernette Schenker-Massot =

Swiss artist (1761–1828)

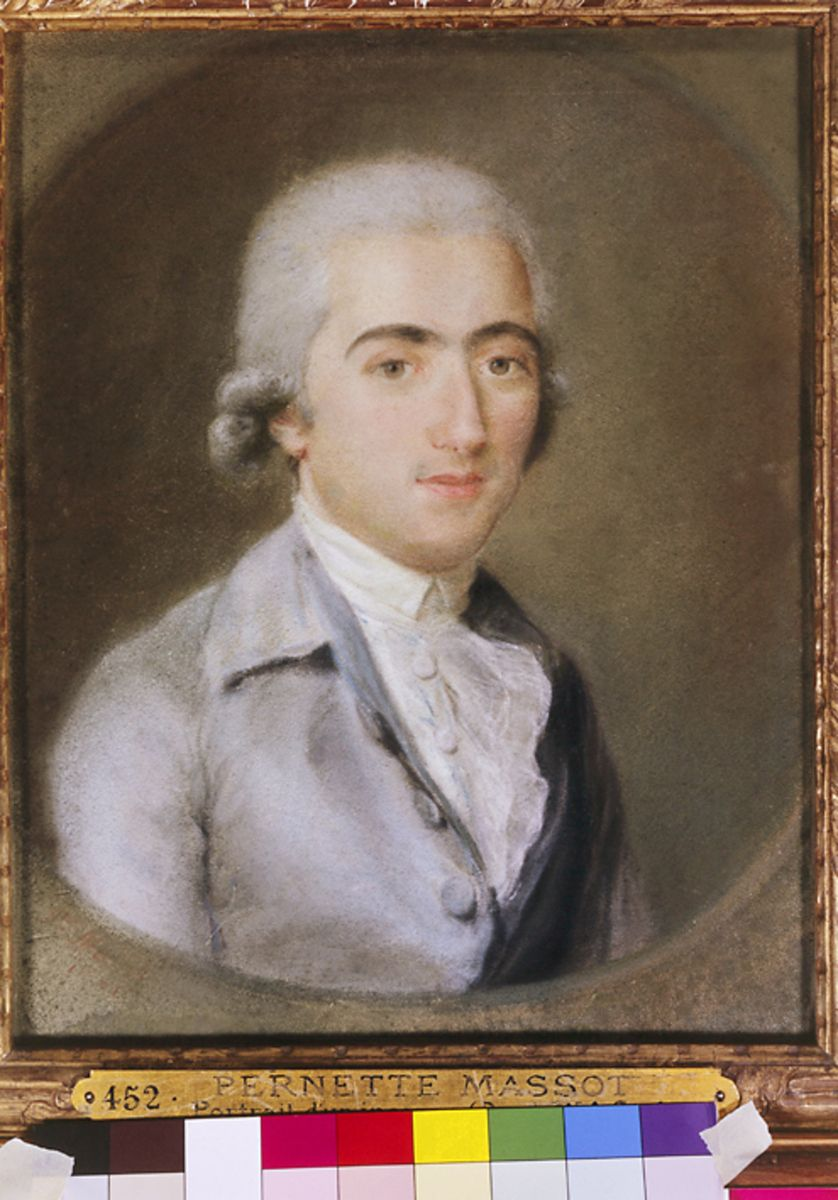
Portrait of a Man, pastel, c. 1780

Jeanne-Pernette Schenker-Massot, often referred to simply as Pernette Massot (November 13, 1761 – January 17, 1828), was a Swiss miniaturist, pastellist, and engraver.

Born in Geneva, Schenker-Massot was the elder sister of the painter Firmin Massot, and has traditionally been described as his first teacher. Her own teacher is said to have been Jean-Baptiste Carvelle, a French expatriate in Switzerland. In 1794 she married the miniaturist and engraver Nicolas Schenker, with whom she had two children.
