= Amélie Munier-Romilly =

Swiss painter (1788–1875)

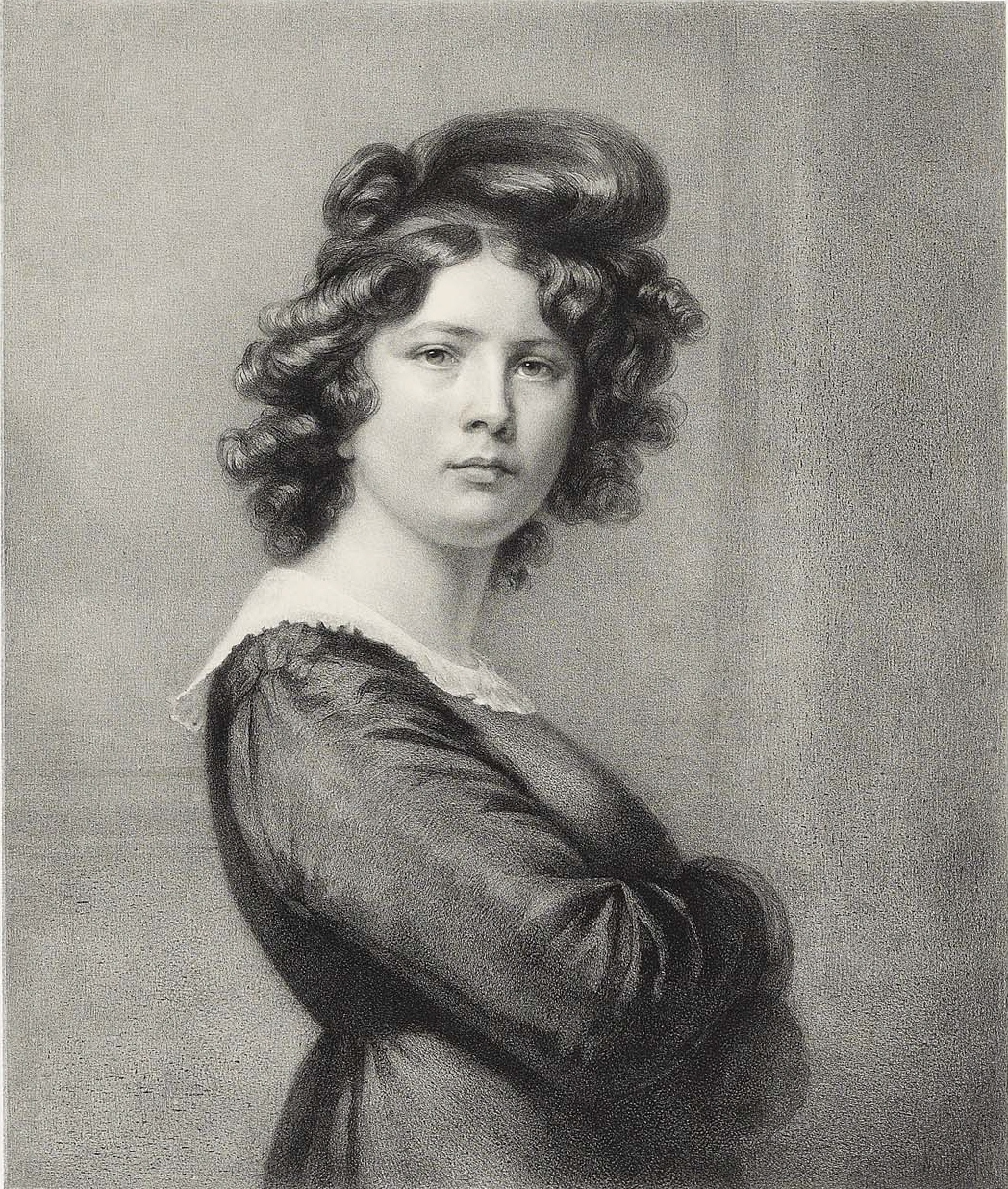
- Born: Amélie Romilly; 21 March, 1788; Geneva
- Died: 12 February, 1875; Geneva
- Citizenship: born in the Republic of Geneva, Swiss since 1815
- Occupation: painter
- Known for: portrait painting
- Spouse: David-François Munier
- Children: four

Amélie Romilly, or Amélie Munier-Romilly after her marriage in 1821, (21 March, 1788 – 12 February, 1875) was a Swiss painter. She studied in Geneva and Paris and it is estimated that she created over 5,000 works in Switzerland, France and Great Britain.

== Life ==
Munier-Romilly was born on 21 March 1788 in Geneva. Her parents were Suzanne Magnin and an engraver named Pierre-Paul Romilly. At the age of thirteen she was obliged to earn money as her father had died.

She became a student of the portrait painter Firmin Massot in 1805 and after teaching her to draw and paint he encouraged her to move to Paris in 1813. She would write to him as she continued her art education with François-Gédéon Reverdin.

She painted portraits in France. She worked in Reverdin's studio, and he introduced her to artists, including Horace Vernet, François Gérard, Pierre-Narcisse Guérin and Jean-Baptiste Isabey. By 1814 she had her work on show in the Paris Salon.

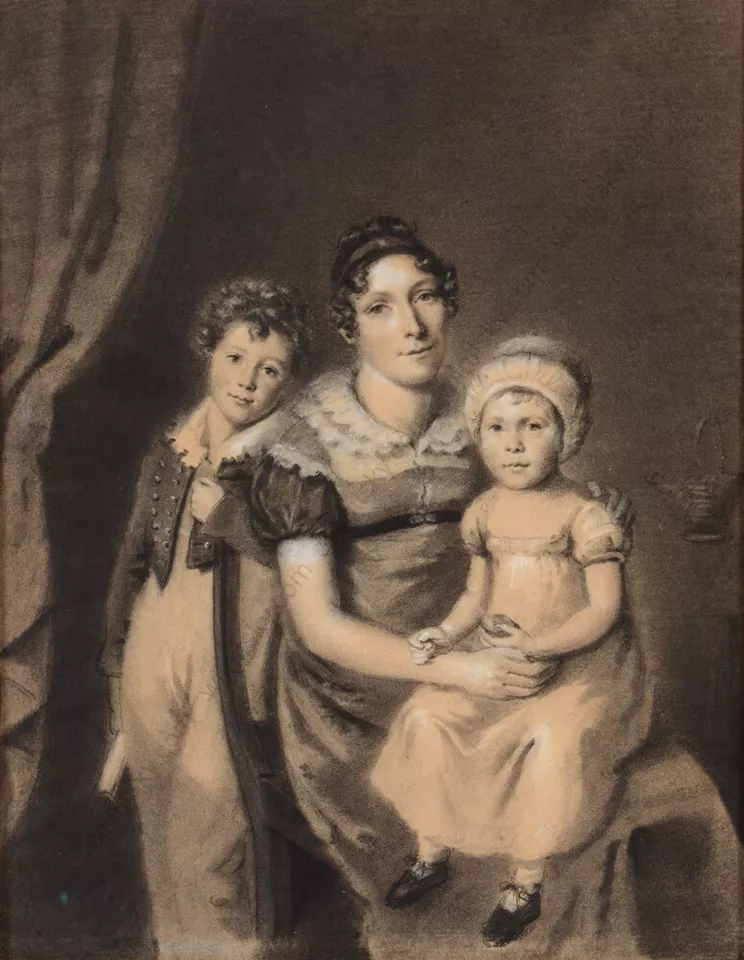
"Lady with her Two Children", 1815/20

She gave lessons to young students back in Geneva. She was elected an honorary associate of the Geneva's Société des Arts in 1815 and in the following year she sketched Jane Franklin. From the 1830s, she developed her own style of bust portraits using pastels, although she painted using charcoal, lithography, oil painting, watercolor as well as pastel.

Her portraits of children added to her reputation. She married a theologian. She witnessed the living conditions of underprivileged children. In addition to her portraits depicting a bourgeoisie where harmony and family happiness reign, she also depicted genre scenes in which she highlighted social inequalities.

In 1836, she was in London.

== Death and legacy ==
Munier-Romilly died on 12 February 1875 in Geneva where a street was named, Rue Munier-Romilly. It is estimated that she created 5,000 works during her career. The British Museum has a collection of engravings of her work.

== Private life ==
She married, David-François Munier, and they had four children.
