= Ida Bindschedler =

Swiss writer (1854-1919)

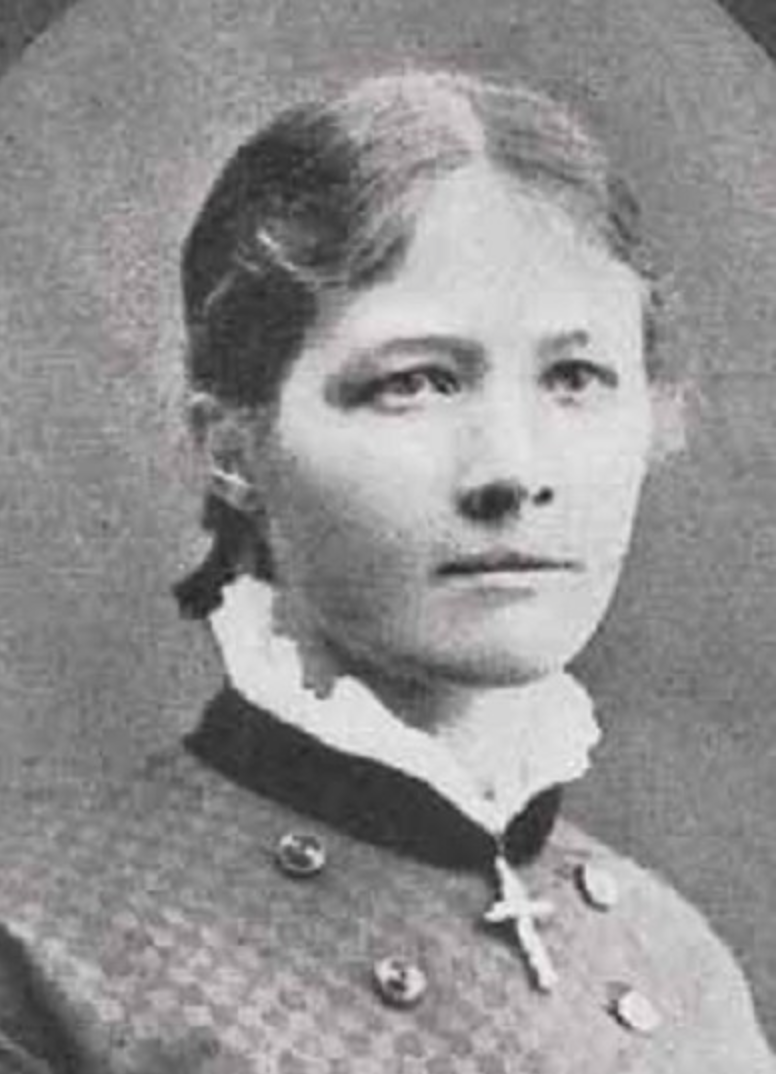
- Ida Bindschedler around 1890
- Born: 7 June 1854; Zürich, Switzerland
- Died: 28 June 1919 (aged 65)

Ida Bindschedler (6 July 1854 – 28 June 1919) was a Swiss children's writer.

== Early life ==
Bindschedler was born in Zürich, Switzerland to cotton merchant Friedrich Rudolf and mother Anna Tauber. Her family spent their summers in Villa Bellerive, which she later used as inspiration for her books.

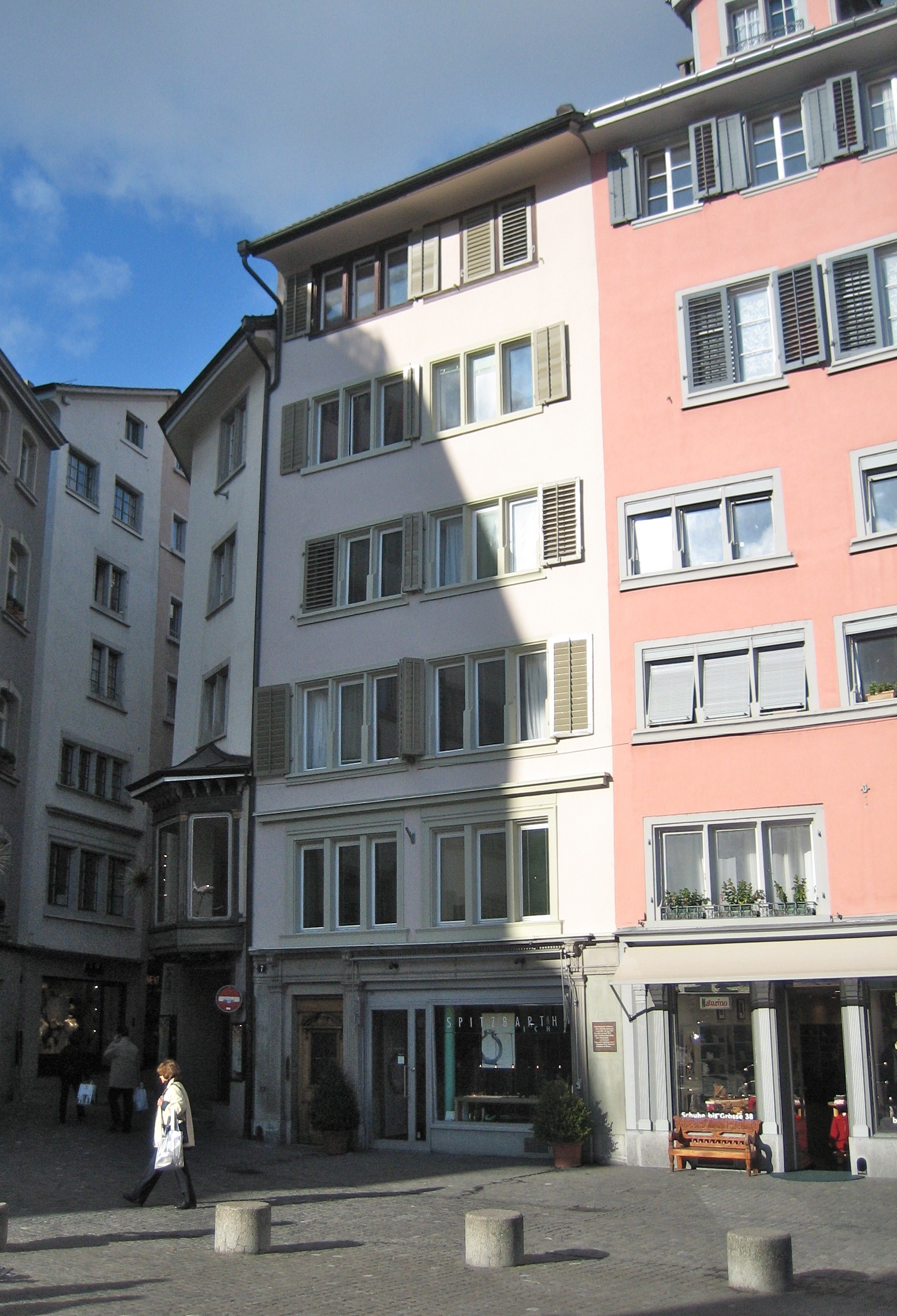
House of Ida Bindschedler's birth

== Career ==
Bindschedler was trained as a teacher under the guidance of Joseph Viktor Widmann, who would later recommend her to teach at a private school in Zurich. She taught at that school for 24 years before leaving due to a heart condition. While at the school, she advanced from primary school teacher to secondary school teacher and also taught in Paris. She worked approximately 40 hours a week both in school and in additional lessons.

After retiring, she moved to Augsburg, Germany, where she wrote her first book, "The Turnach children in summer."

Bindschedler's books were very successful in Switzerland, tying Johanna Spyri's book Heidi in popularity there.

== Death and legacy ==
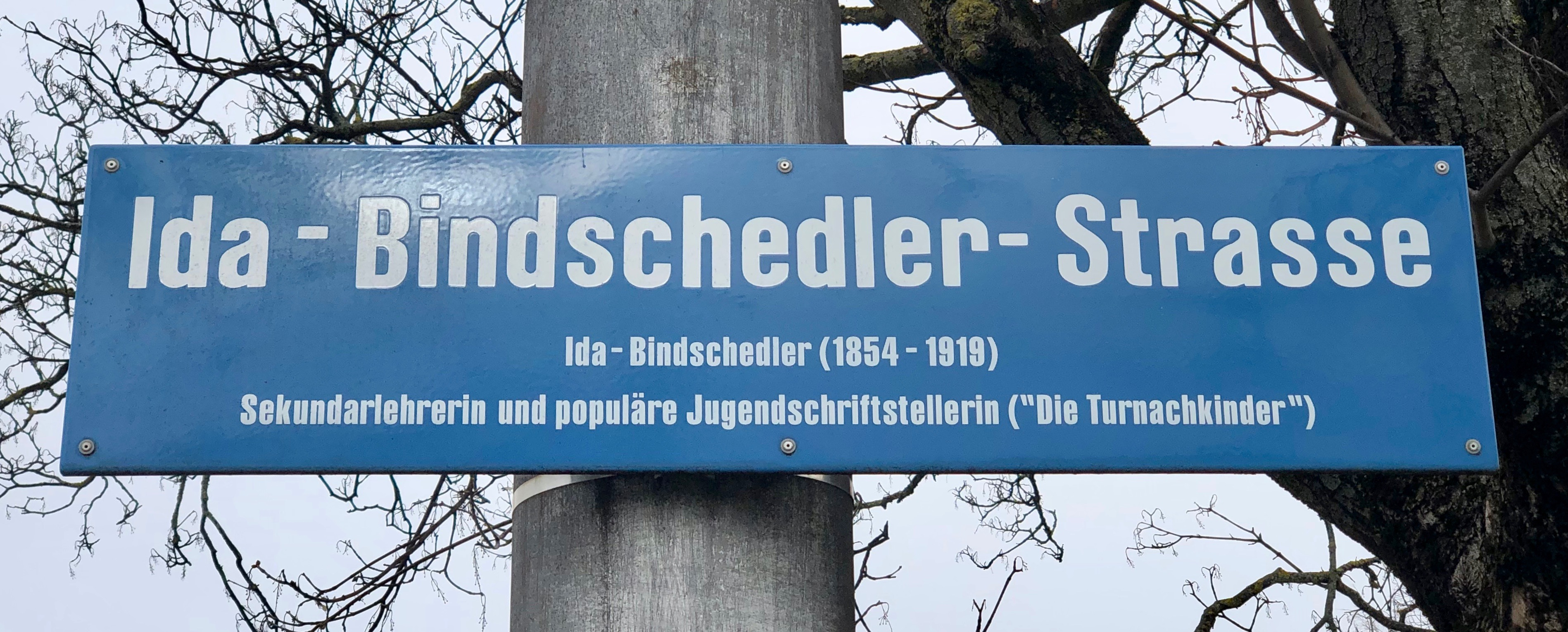
Street named in her honour

Bindschedler died on 28 June 1919. Many of her books took place in Seeweid in the Riesbach district of Zurich. The district named a street in her honour.

== Selected publications ==
The following is a list of selected publications:

- Turnachkinder
- Die Turnachkinder im Sommer (1906)
- Die Turnachkinder im Winter (1909)

== Bibliography ==
Judith Burgdorfer: Ida Bindschedler: Leben, Wirken und Werk der 'Turnachkinder'-Autorin, NZZ, Libro, 2024.
