= Corinne at Cape Misenum =

Painting by François Gérard

'Corinne at Cape Misenum
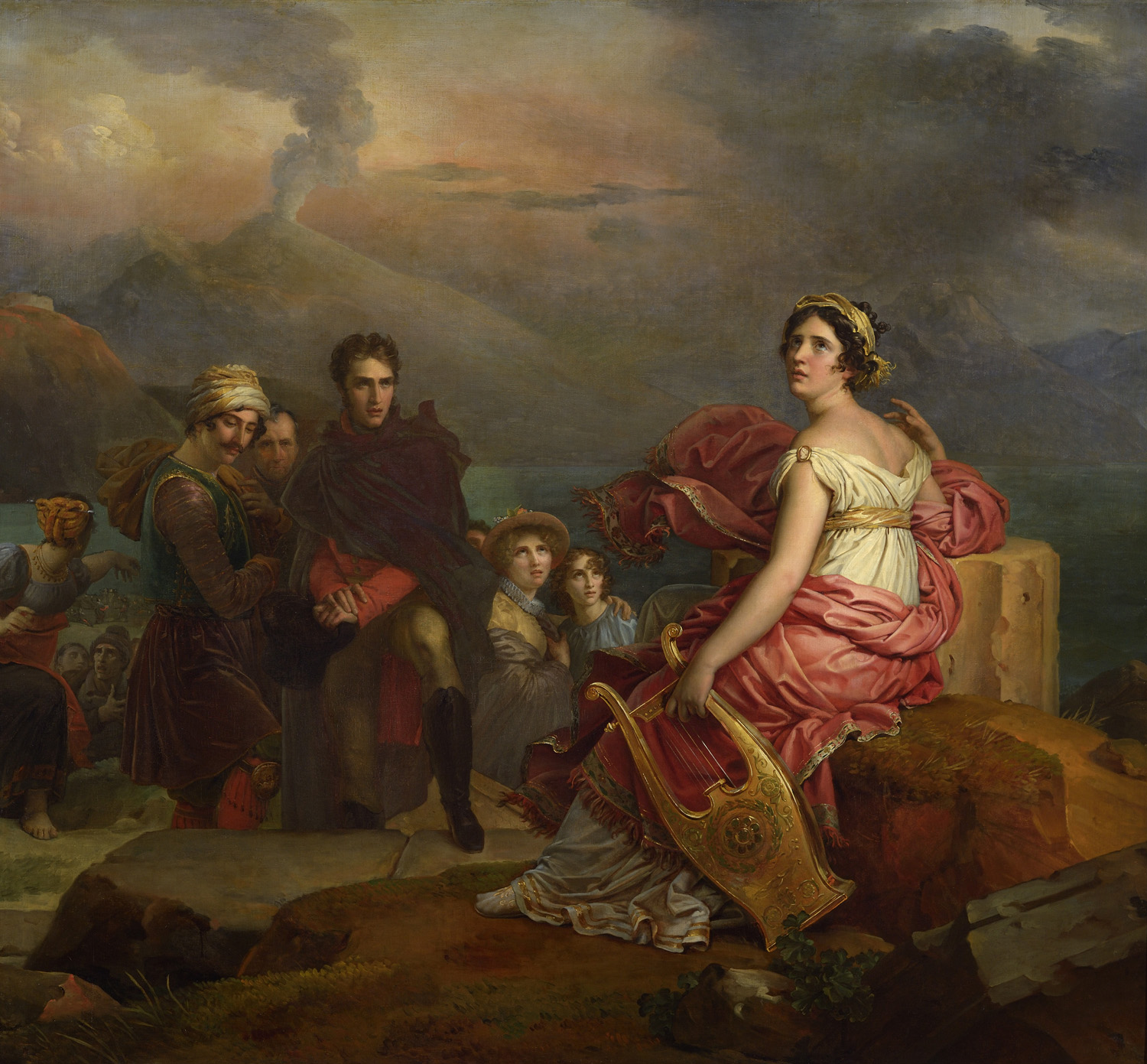
- Artist: François Gérard
- Year: 1819–1821
- Medium: oil on canvas
- Dimensions: 256.5 cm × 277 cm (101.0 in × 109 in)
- Location: Musée des Beaux-Arts de Lyon; Lyon

Corinne at Cape Misenum is an oil-on-canvas painting by the French artist François Gérard, created in 1819–1821. It depicts the title character from Corinne, an 1808 novel by Madame de Stael, at Cape Miseno, focusing on an Ancient Greek poet. The painting is held now in the Musée des Beaux-Arts de Lyon.

== Similar Paintings ==
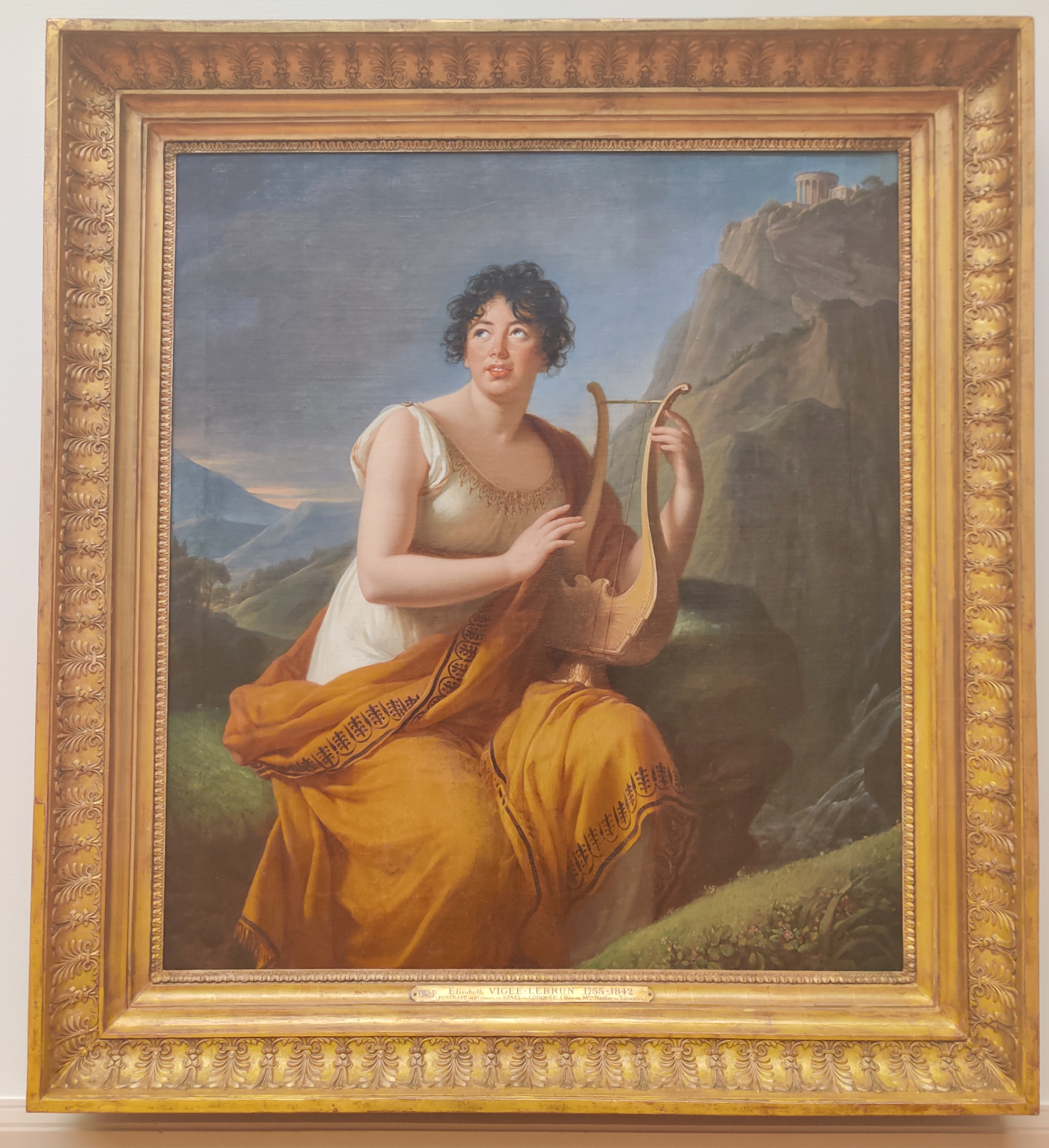
Portrait de Germaine de Staël en Corinne au Cap Misène by Elisabeth-Louise Vigee-Lebrun
