= Firmin Massot =

Swiss painter

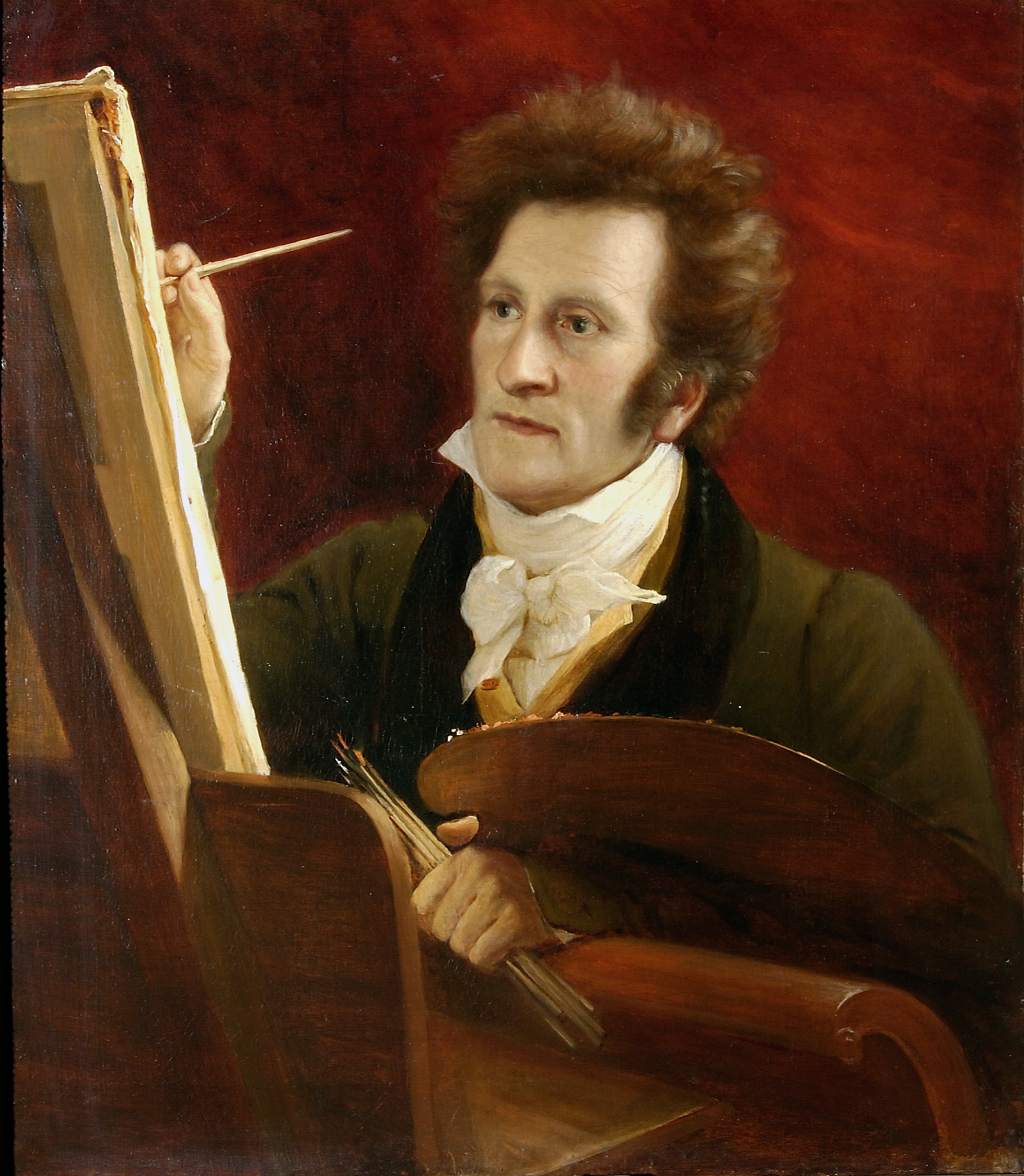
Portrait of Firmin Massot, painted by Amélie Munier-Romilly

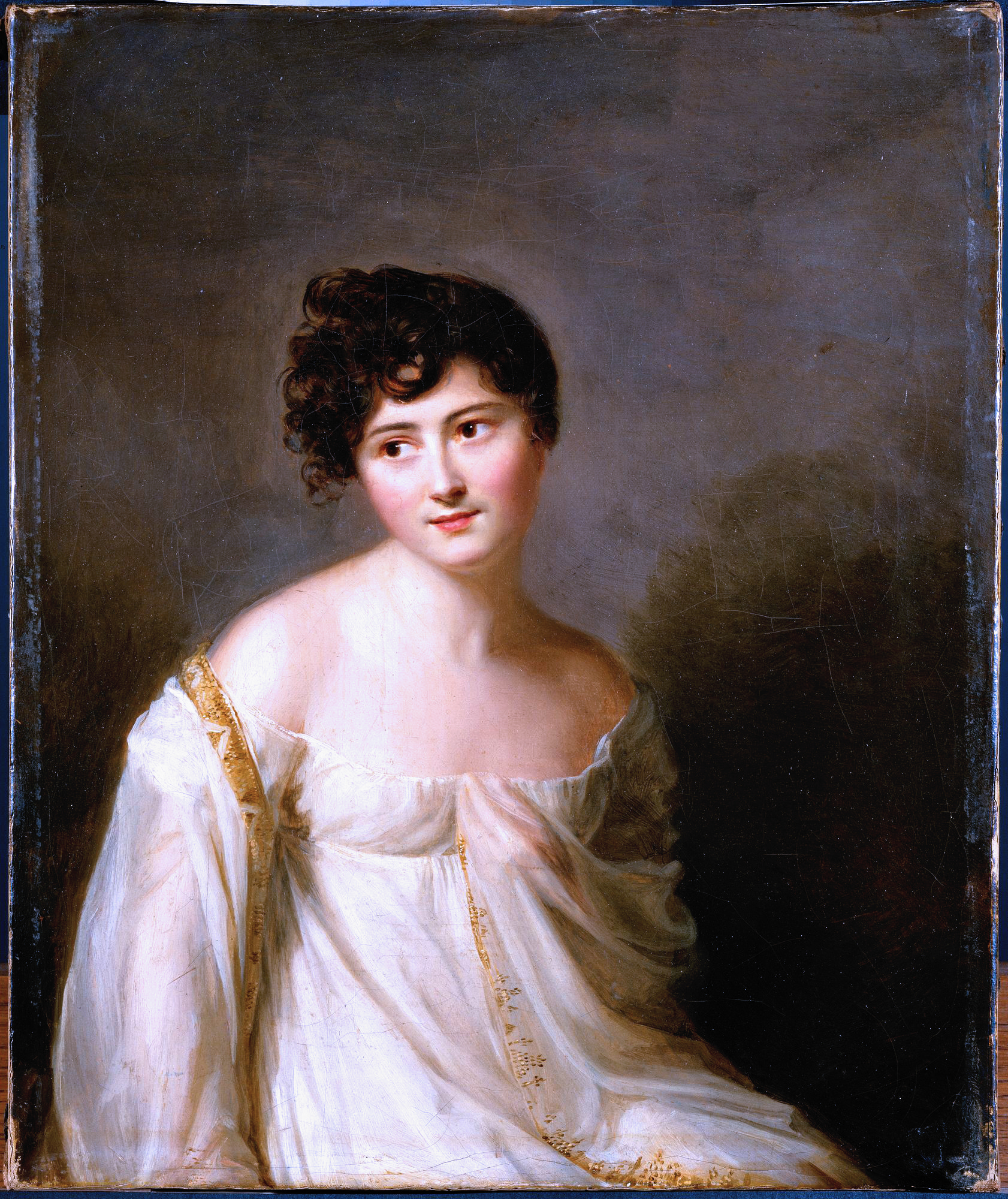
Portrait of Juliette Récamier

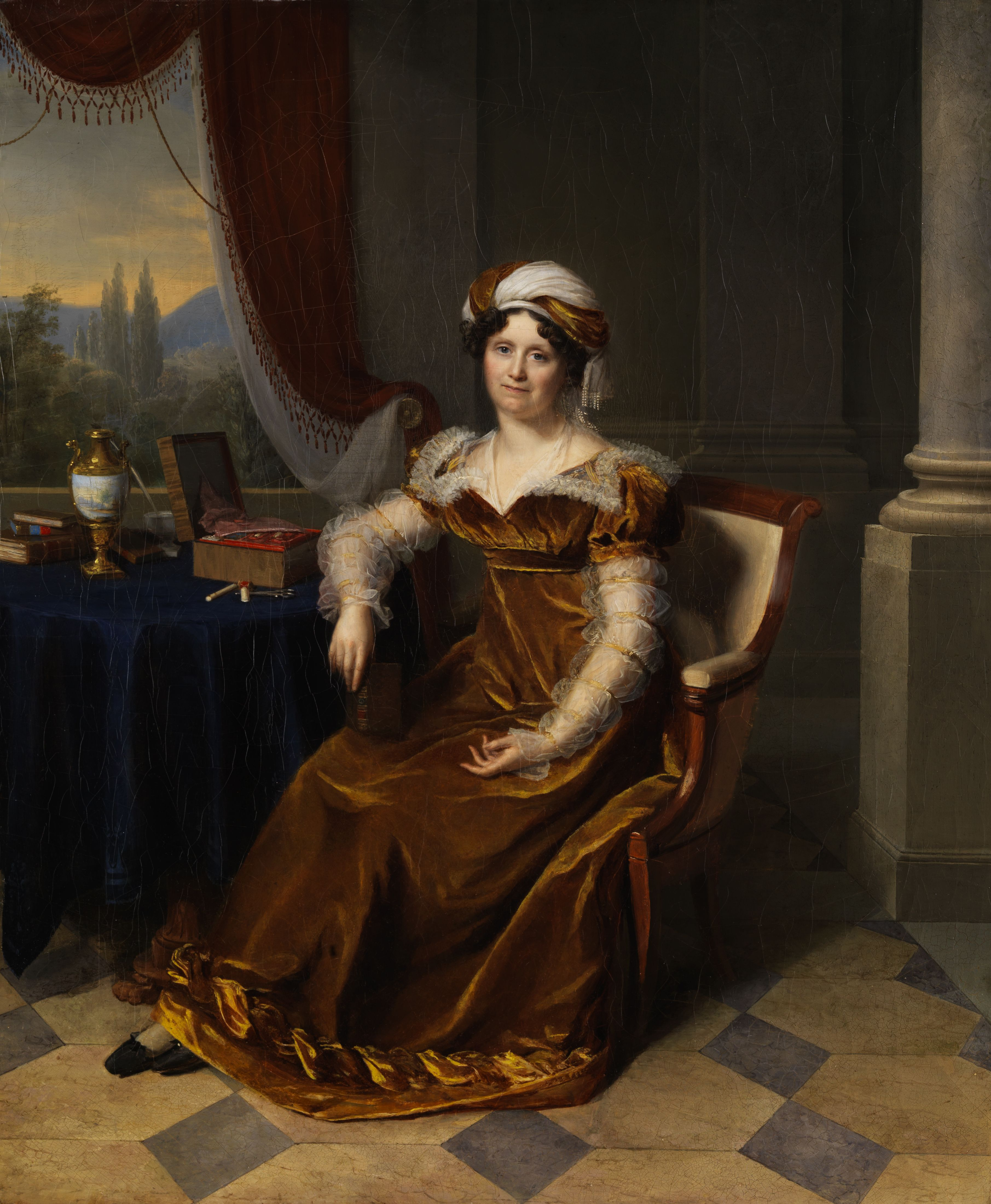
Portrait of a Lady (believed to be Madame Marbon)

Firmin Massot (5 May 1766, in Geneva, Republic of Geneva – 16 May 1849, in Geneva, Switzerland) was a Swiss portrait painter.

== Biography ==
His father was a master watchmaker. He began his studies in 1778 at the "School of Drawing", then attended classes at the "Society of Arts of Geneva", where he studied with Jean-Étienne Liotard, among others. A trip to Italy from 1787 to 1788 had a lasting effect on his style. He had his first showing in 1789 at the Salon of Geneva, where he presented an Étude d'après nature (Study from Nature). At the next Salon, he won the Grand Prize. In 1794, he was invited to Lausanne to work for Madame de Staël.

In 1799, he was named Director of the "Écoles de dessin de la ville de Genève" and, the following year, became a member of the art society. Amélie Munier-Romilly became his student in 1805 and after teaching her to draw and paint he encouraged her to move to Paris in 1813.

From 1807 to 1813, he travelled throughout France, making contacts with fellow artists. From 1828 to 1829, he toured England and Scotland, receiving many commissions along the way and becoming enamored of the English "conversation pieces". He also favored a style known as "jusqu'aux genoux" (as far as the knees).

After 1820, he eschewed detailed backgrounds in favor of simple tones that emphasized the face. Until then, however, many of his portraits were done in collaboration with the landscape painter Wolfgang-Adam Töpffer and the animal painter Jacques-Laurent Agasse. Created mostly for wealthy patrons, Massot would paint the figures while his associates would fill in the backgrounds with various props that symbolized the sitter. Perhaps because of this, very few of his paintings are signed and attribution is often difficult. It is believed that approximately 250 works are authentically his.

Many prominent women were among his sitters, including Madame Recamier, the Empress Josephine and Queen Hortense. His sister Pernette was also a painter and engraver and is sometimes cited as his first teacher.

== Gallery ==
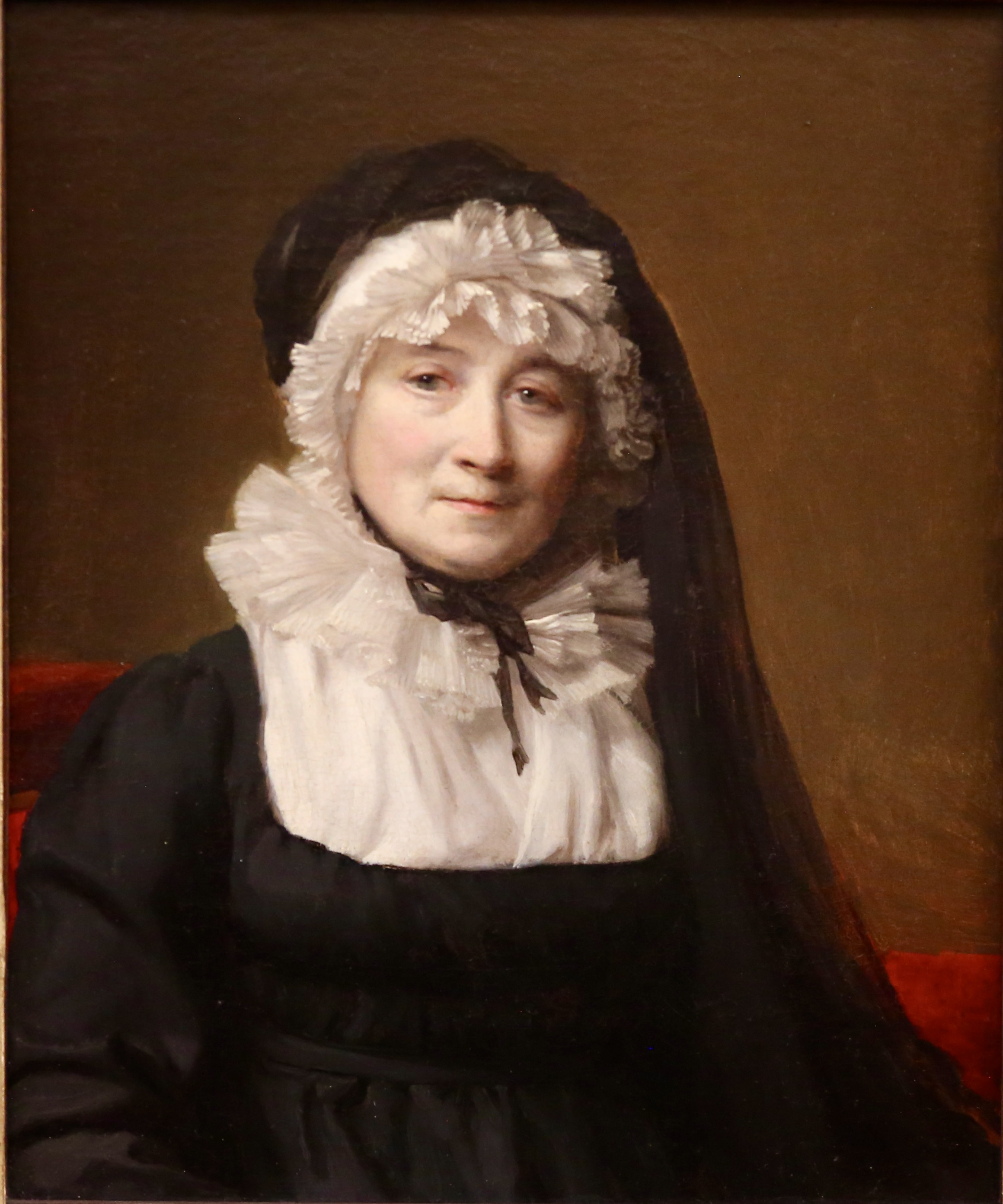
Portrait of a lady, 1815/1820

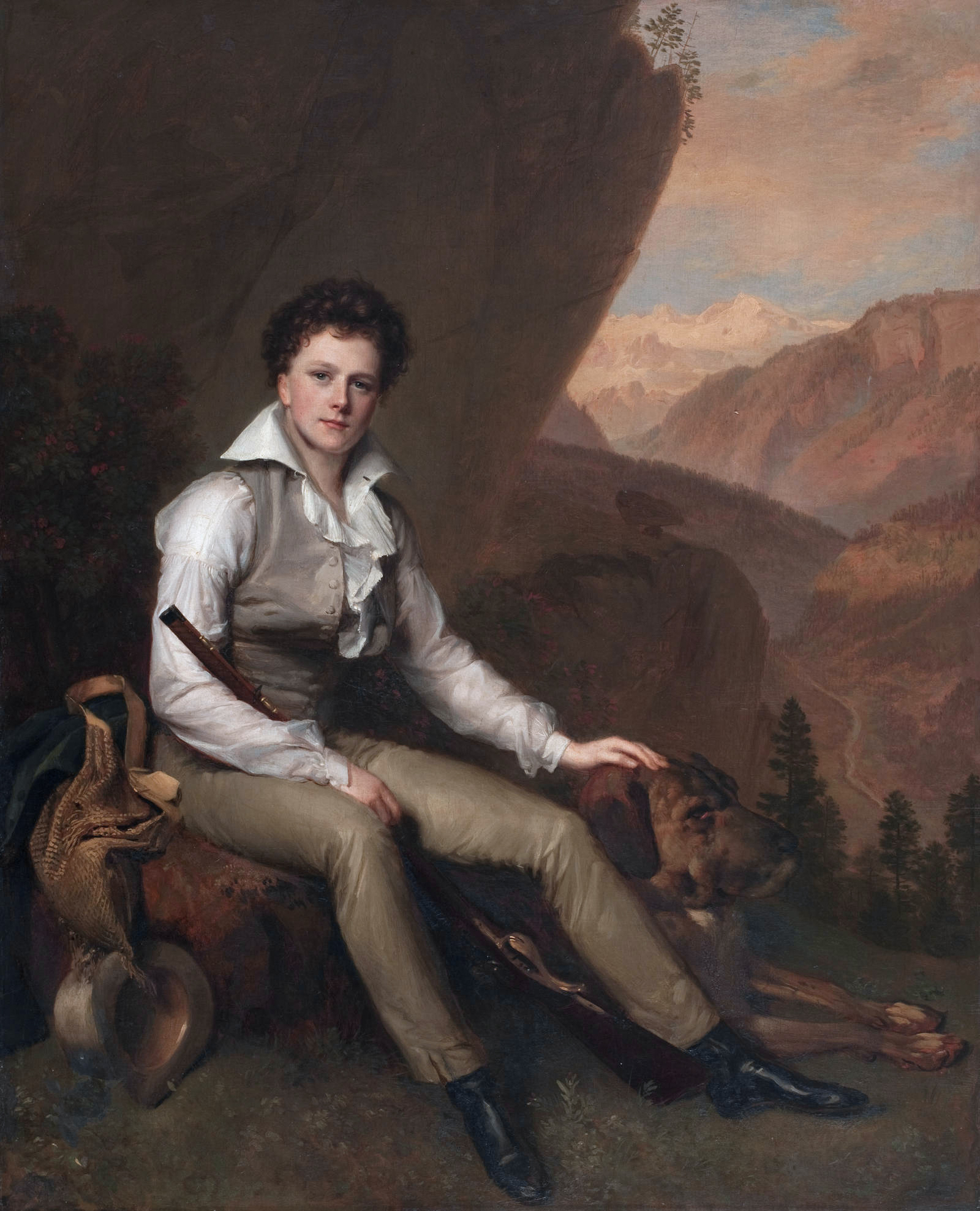
John Campbell, 2nd Marquess of Breadalbane, 1849

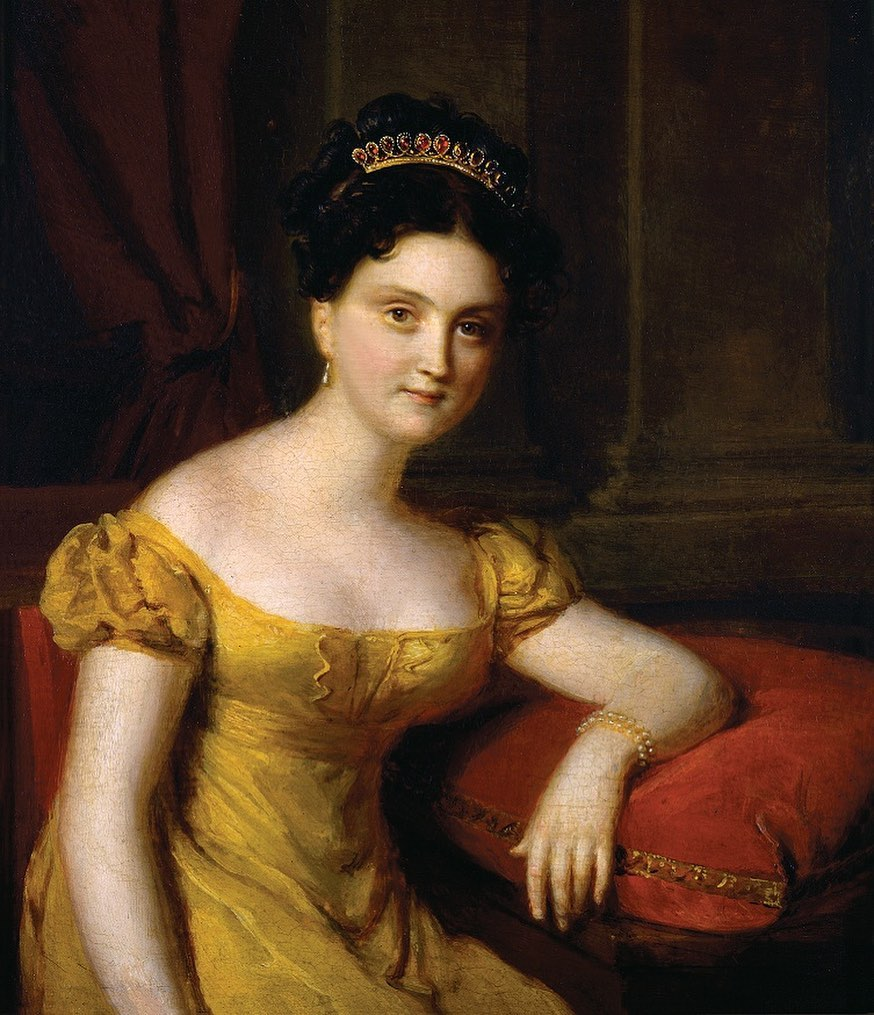
Elizabeth Patterson Bonaparte, 1823

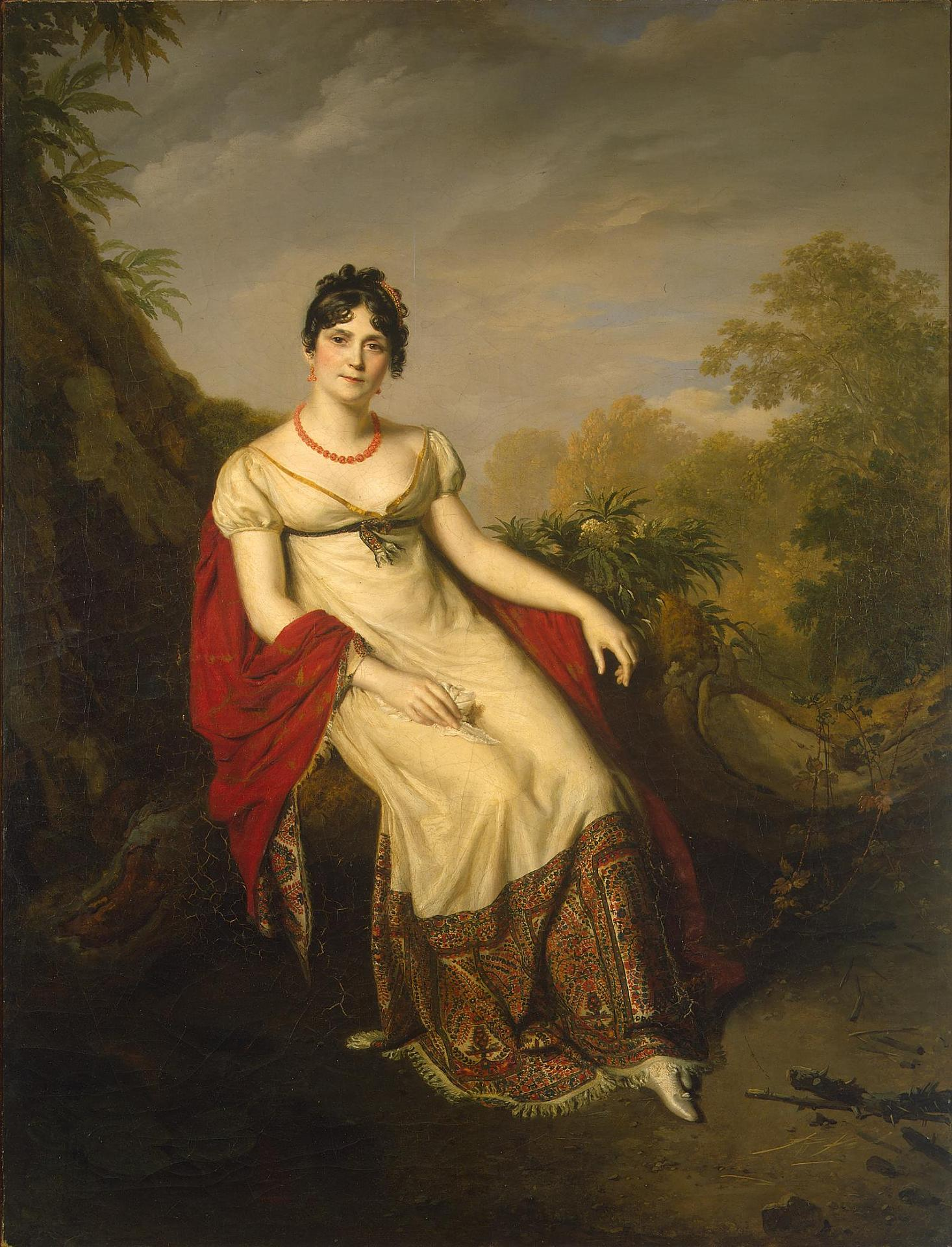
Joséphine de Beauharnais, 1812

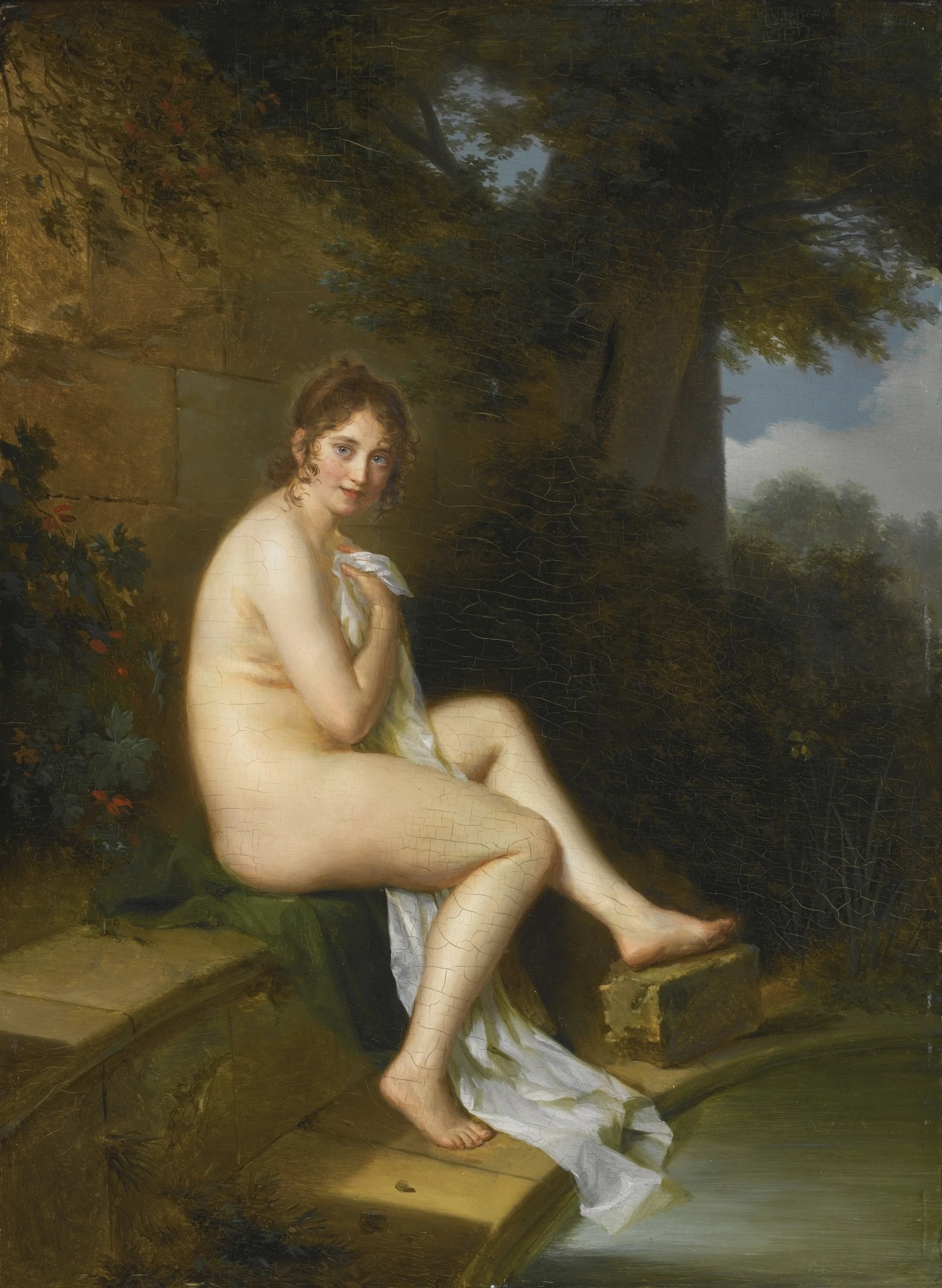
A nude at her bath, 1849

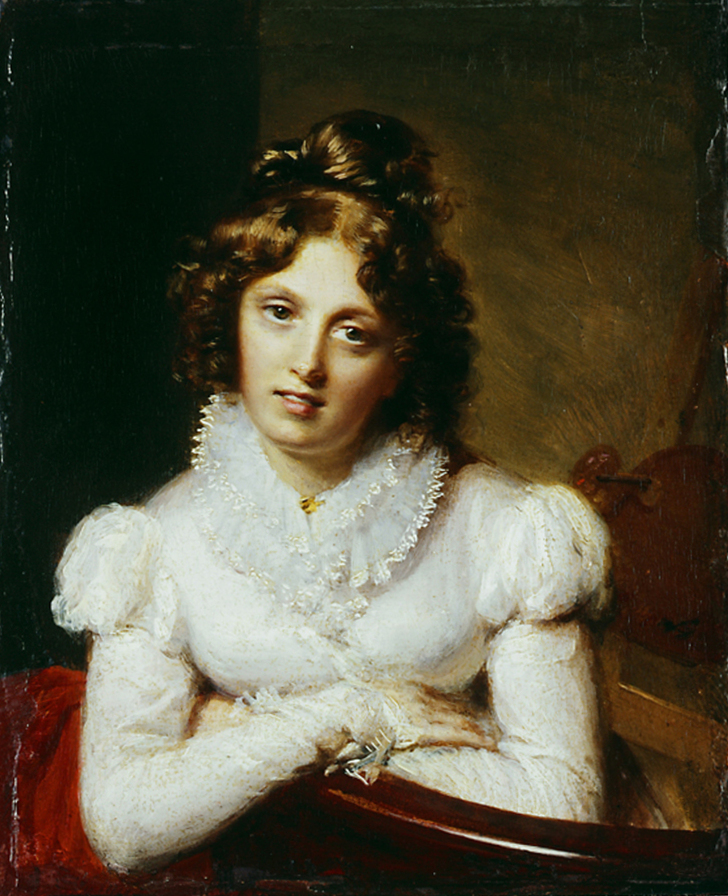
Nancy Mérienne, 1846
