= History of Geneva =

Coat of arms of Geneva

The history of Geneva dates from before the Roman occupation in the second century BC. Now the principal French-speaking city of Switzerland, Geneva was an independent city state from the Middle Ages until the end of the 18th century. John Calvin was the Protestant leader of the city in the 16th century.

Historical states

Allobroges oppidum c. 2nd century–121 BC
Roman Republic 121–27 BC
Roman Empire 27 BC–AD 395
Western Roman Empire 395–443
Kingdom of the Burgundians 443–534
Francia 534–843
Middle Francia 843-855
Kingdom of Lotharingia 855–859
Kingdom of Italy 859–870
East Francia 870–876
West Francia 876–880
East Francia 880–888
Kingdom of Upper Burgundy 888–933
Kingdom of Arles 933–1032
County of Geneva 1032–1124
Bishopric of Geneva 1124–1534
Republic of Geneva 1534–1798
French First Republic 1798–1804
First French Empire 1804–1813
Restored Republic of Geneva 1813–1815
Swiss Confederation 1815-present

== Antiquity and Early Middle Ages ==
Geneva first appears in history as an Allobrogian border town, fortified against the Celtic Helvetii tribe, which the Roman Republic took in 121 BC.

In 58 BC, Caesar, Roman governor of Gaul, destroyed the Rhône bridge at Geneva and built a 19-mile earthwork from Lake Geneva to the Jura Mountains in order to block the migration of the Helvetii, who "attempted, sometimes by day, more often by night, to break through, either by joining boats together and making a number of rafts (ratis), or by fording the Rhône where the depth of the stream was least" (De Bello Gallico, I, 8). Then he helped establish Geneva as a Roman city (vicus and then civitas) by setting up camp there and significantly increasing its size.

In 443, Geneva was taken by Burgundy, and with the latter fell to the Franks in 534. In 888 the town was part of the new Kingdom of Burgundy, and with it was taken over in 1033 by the Holy Roman Emperor.

In 563, according to the writings of Gregory of Tours and Marius Aventicensis, a tsunami swept along Lake Geneva, destroying many settlements, and causing numerous deaths in Geneva. Simulations indicate that this Tauredunum event was most likely caused by a massive landslide near where the Rhone flows into the lake, which caused a wave eight meters high to reach Geneva within 70 minutes.

== Early Christian ministry ==
Geneva became an episcopal seat in the 4th century.

According to legendary accounts found in the works of Gregorio Leti ("Historia Genevrena", Amsterdam, 1686) and Besson ("Memoires pour l'histoire ecclésiastique des diocèses de Genève, Tarantaise, Aoste et Maurienne", Nancy, 1739; new ed. Moutiers, 1871), Geneva was Christianised by Dionysius Areopagita and Paracodus, two of the 72 disciples, in the time of Domitian. Dionysius went thence to Paris and Paracodus became the first Bishop of Geneva – but the legend is based on an error, as is that which makes St. Lazarus the first Bishop of Geneva, arising out of the similarity between the Latin names Genava (Geneva) and Genua (Genoa, in northern Italy). The so-called "Catalogue de St. Pierre", which names St. Diogenus (Diogenes) as the first Bishop of Geneva, is unreliable.

A letter of St. Eucherius to Salvius makes it almost certain that the name of the first bishop (c. 400) was Isaac. In 440, Salonius appears as Bishop of Geneva; he was a son of Eucherius, to whom the latter dedicated his Instructiones'; he took part in the Council of Orange (441), Vaison (442) and Arles (about 455), and is supposed to be the author of two small commentaries, In parabolas Salomonis and on Ecclesisastis. Little is known about the following bishops:

- Theoplastus (about 475), to whom Sidonius Apollinaris addressed a letter.
- Dormitianus (before 500), under whom the Burgundian Princess Sedeleuba, a sister of Queen Clotilde, had the remains of the martyr and St. Victor of Soleure transferred to Geneva, where she built a basilica in his honour.
- St. Maximus (about 512-41), a friend of Avitus, Archbishop of Vienne and Cyprian of Toulon, with whom he was in correspondence.
- Bishop Pappulus sent the priest Thoribiusas his substitute to the Synod of Orléans (541).
- Bishop Salonius II is only known from the signatures of the Synods of Lyon (570) and Paris (573) and Bishop Cariatto, installed by King Guntram in 584, was present at the two Synods of Valence and Macon in 585.

== High and Late Middle Ages ==
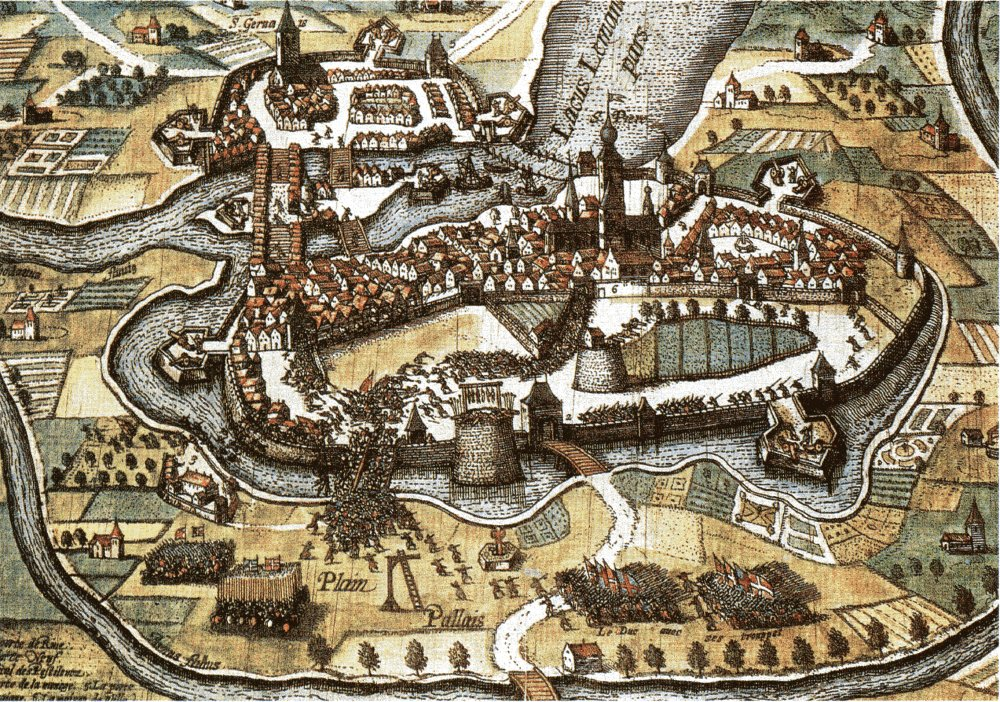
L'Escalade is what Genevans call the failed surprise attack of 12 December 1602 by troops sent by Charles Emmanuel I, Duke of Savoy, to take Geneva. This imaginative image was drawn by Matthias Quad, or the workshop of Franz Hogenberg, around 1603. Invaders are pictured crossing the moat in the center left while reinforcements are entering Plainpalais at the bottom. A column of defenders is in the center, headed toward the Savoyards. Lake Léman is at center top.

The flag of Geneva since the 15th century is divided per pale showing both the imperial eagle and a key of St. Peter, reflecting its dual status as free city and Prince-Bishopric.

From the beginning, the bishopric of Geneva operated as a suffragan of the Archbishopric of Vienne. The bishops of Geneva had the status of prince of the Holy Roman Empire from 1154, but had to maintain a long struggle for their independence against the guardians (advocati) of the see, the counts of Geneva and later the counts of the House of Savoy. It is some time around 1219 that the Counts of Geneva completely quit the city and moved their capital to Annecy.

In 1290, the latter obtained the right of installing the vice-dominus of the diocese, the title of "Vidame of Geneva" was granted by Amadeus V, Count of Savoy in the name of the Holy See (by the Foreign relations of the Holy See) to the counts of the House of Candia under count François de Candie of Chambéry-Le-Vieux a Chatellaine of the Savoy, this official exercised minor jurisdiction in the town in the bishop's absence.

In 1387, Bishop Adhémar Fabry granted the town its great charter, the basis of its communal self-government, which every bishop on his accession was expected to confirm. The line of the counts of Geneva ended in 1394, and the House of Savoy came into possession of their territory, assuming after 1416 the title of Duke. The new dynasty sought to bring the city of Geneva under their power, particularly by elevating members of their own family to the episcopal see. In 1447 Antipope Felix V, who was also Duke of Savoy, appointed himself as bishop of Geneva, and the Savoy dynasty ruled the episcopal see until 1490, when popular pressure compelled the dynasty to renounce the title of bishop.

In 1457 a major government organ was established in Geneva, known as the Grand Council, which first consisted of 50 deputies and later their number was raised to 200. The members of the Grand Council were elected every year in early February. The Grand Council represented the citizens of Geneva and decided on political matters and also elected the bishops of Geneva after that position was renounced by the Savoy dynasty in 1490. This same council gradually became estranged from the Duke of Savoy.

== Savoyard Bishops ==
A new cause of friction between the Grand Council and the Duke of Savoy evolved in 1513, when Charles III decided to appoint his cousin John of Savoy as bishop and even secured Papal endorsement. Despite being bishop of Geneva, the new Savoy bishop resided most of the time in Pignerol in Piedmont, another factor enhancing the alienation between the people in Geneva and the Savoy dynasty.

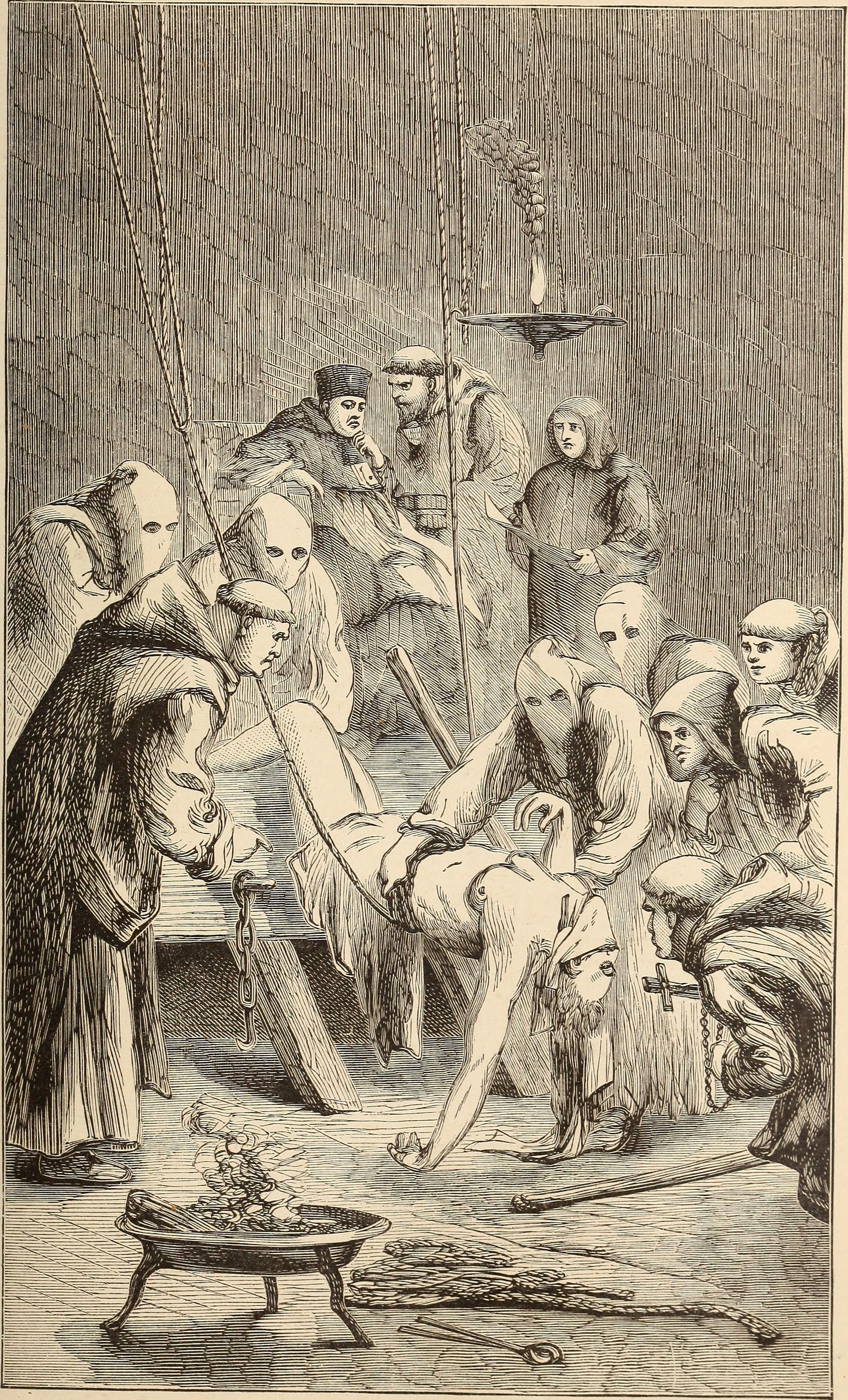
Jean Pécolat being tortured in 1517 under the order of Jean de Savoie, Bishop of Geneva

In 1519, the Grand Council of Geneva attempted to forge an alliance with Fribourg, but the Duke of Savoy responded with invasion of the republic, which led to the execution of Philibert Berthelier and suspension of the Grand Council's powers. However, after that date the power of Savoy over Geneva gradually declined. In 1521 Jean of Savoy died, and the Grand Council appealed to Pope Leo X to appoint the next bishop, who then appointed Pierre de la Baume. In addition, the Duke of Savoy also tried to reconcile his political ambitions with local Genevan patriotism, and in 1523 marched into Geneva in a ceremony designated to appease its population, and tried to gain the support of the Geneva merchants by promising them a share in the trade with the Kingdom of Portugal (his wife's country of origin) and its territories in Brazil. However, the independence faction in Geneva did not accept these gestures. Another political crisis occurred in 1524, when the treasurer of Geneva, Bernard Boulet, a supporter of Savoy rule, was accused by the Grand Council of embezzlement. He reacted to the accusations by appealing to Charles III to curtail the powers of the council once more, to which the Duke responded by confiscating assets held by council members in other territories under Savoy rule.

In January 1525 the council appealed to the Pope to excommunicate Charles III. The deputies' attempt to enlist the support of the bishop Pierre de la Baume for their cause failed, and the Pope rejected their request. However, Charles III feared another rebellion, and in September 1525 made another proposal of power-sharing to the Grand Council of Geneva, which the council endorsed by 53–42. However, Charles III was not satisfied with this and started a new invasion of Geneva in order to destroy the pro-independence faction. The pro-independence faction fled to Fribourg, and in December 1525 the Grand Council acknowledged Charles III as the true sovereign of Geneva (a session known as the "Assembly of Halberds"). However, members of the pro-independence faction began their own clandestine campaign to enlist support for their cause, and in February 1526 gained the support of bishop Pierre de la Baume. Elections to the Grand Council took place the same month and led to a pro-independence majority that voted to break away from Savoy rule. Eventually the Grand Council succeeded in protecting the liberty of its citizens by establishing union with the Old Swiss Confederacy (Alte Eidgenossenschaft), by concluding on February 20, 1526 a treaty of alliance with Bern and Fribourg. On March 12, representatives of the other Swiss cantons appeared before the Grand Council in Geneva and swore to protect that republic as part of their confederation.

== Reformation ==
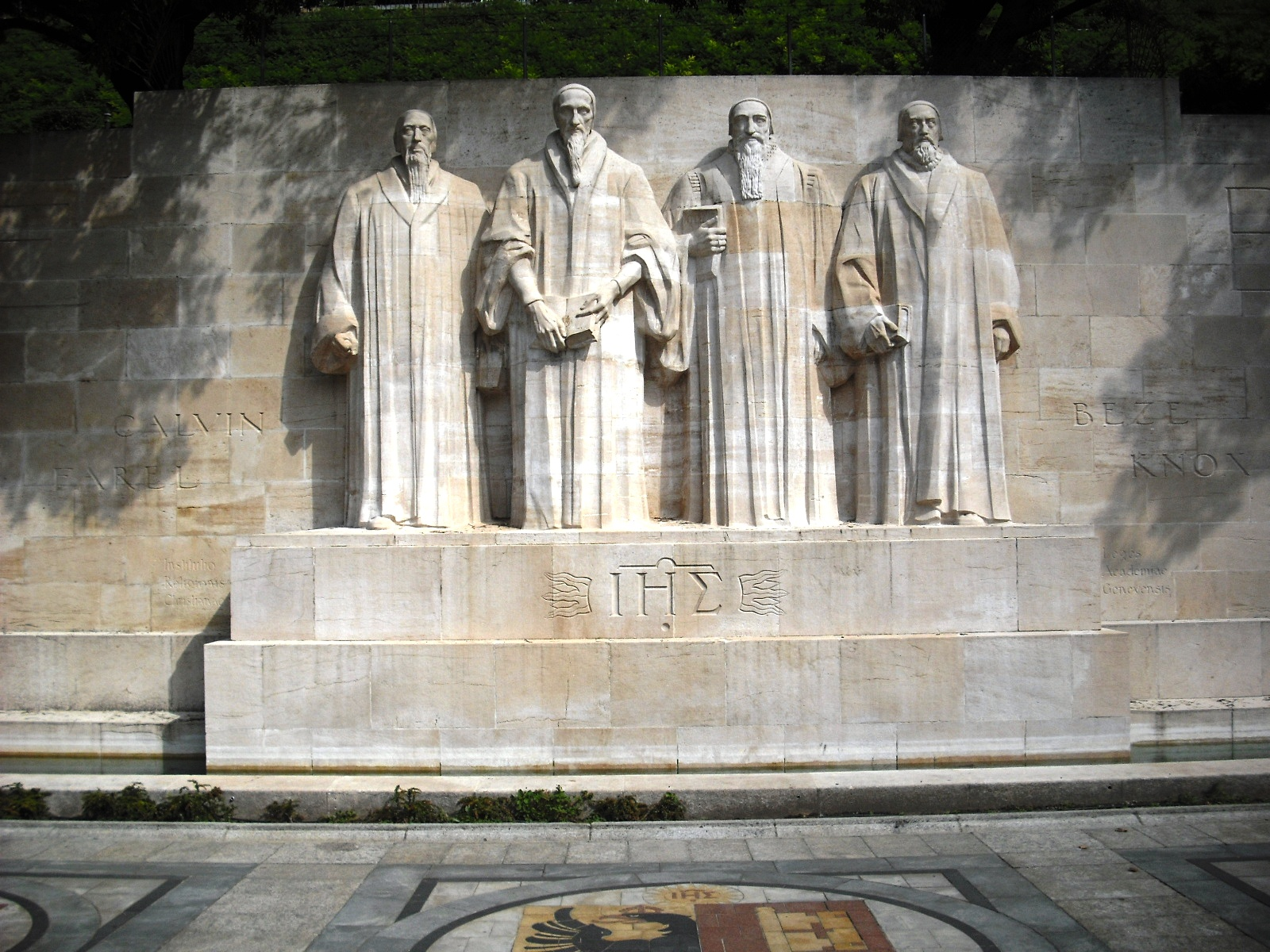
The International Monument to the Reformation

Calvin's Geneva became a major centre of the Protestant Reformation. The first French Protestant refugees arrived in 1523, and their theology quickly gained influence. The power of the Catholic Church weakened after the bishop fled in 1527, leaving the Grand Council free to push reforms. Although Duke Charles III of Savoy repeatedly tried to bring Geneva back under Catholic rule - most famously during the “day of the ladders” in 1529—Bern and Fribourg provided protection, and the city resisted these efforts.

Conflicts between Catholic and Protestant factions remained fierce and the attempts at compromise, such as the 1533 statute allowing private choice of religion but banning open attacks on Catholic practices, failed to end tensions. Catholic influence waned after Bishop, Pierre de La Baume’s final flight from Geneva in July 1533, and by 1534 secular authorities had gained the right to try clergy. Growing agitation and pressure from Bern further strengthened the Protestant cause. By 1535, mass Catholic emigration and repeated Savoy invasions left Geneva’s Protestant faction dominant.

The Genevan Reformation was made official on May 21, 1536, when all citizens swore allegiance to the Lutheran faith, proclaiming Geneva a Protestant republic. John Calvin soon emerged as the city’s spiritual leader, turning Geneva into a hub of Protestant thought and refuge for reformers, though he often clashed with civic leaders. The city also developed welfare and education systems under Calvin’s influence. Despite much of the surrounding diocese later returning to Catholicism under Francis de Sales, Geneva maintained its Protestant identity and, in 1584, strengthened ties with Bern and Zürich through an “eternal treaty.”

== 17th century ==
In the 1580s, the conflict with Savoy intensified once again after the accession of Charles Emmanuel I. In the event known as L'Escalade of the night of 11 December 1602 (Old Style), the Savoiards attempted to take the city by stealth, climbing over the walls using black ladders. They were discovered and repelled.

The city became increasingly aristocratic during the 17th century, to the point that it became almost impossible for outsiders to acquire citizenship. The common assembly (Conseil général) became almost powerless, to the benefit of the lesser council (Petit Conseil) and the council of the two-hundred (Conseil des Deux-Cents), which were filled with members of the powerful families in nepotistic appointments. Society was divided between the Citoyens, who were either members of the old patriciate or offsprings of Bourgeois born in Geneva, and had full citizenship, the Bourgeois, who were either naturalized citizens or offsprings of Bourgeois not born in the city, the Natifs, Geneva-born descendants of residents without citizenship, and the mere Habitants, non-citizens permitted residence in exchange for a fee. Finally, Sujets were the population of a number of nearby villages controlled by the city.

== 18th century ==
Throughout this century, Geneva was plagued by strife between the Francophone oligarchy and radical populist opponents. The elite dominated the councils of the republic, and used their position to raise indirect taxes which hurt the poor more than the rich. They were accused of being pro-French libertine rentiers, committed neither to the republic nor to Calvinism, whereas the opposition subscribed to strict Calvinism and populist republicanism.

Conflict between these factions led to rioting in 1734–1737, which was settled after the diplomatic intervention of France and Geneva's two Swiss allies, Bern and Zurich. In the 1750s the opposition, led by watchmaker Jacques François Deluc (1698–1780), began to call themselves the représentants (representatives). They wanted the General Council (AKA the Grand Council, Geneva's legislature) to more truly represent the people and to re-assert its power over the aristocratic ministers on the Council of Twenty-Five (the executive council). This did not happen, but further unrest in 1767 led to another French-brokered agreement between elitists and populists.

Meanwhile, a quarrel between French-speaking intellectuals whipped up the unrest still further. A piece written by Jean le Rond d'Alembert appeared in 1757 in volume 7 of the Encyclopédie criticising the puritanism of Geneva's Calvinist pastors and advocating the adoption of the enlightened arts as in France. Jean Jacques Rousseau fell out with him and other philosophes such as Denis Diderot and Voltaire over this, advocating stricter morals and siding with the radicals, although not going so far as to advocate democracy.

Finally, in the abortive Geneva Revolution of 1782, revolutionary ideologues and working-class activists demanding a broader franchise seized the state. Popular representatives were elected to an executive committee which proceeded to enact wide-ranging reforms. However France, Bern and Savoy sent a military force to Geneva, causing the leading revolutionaries to flee to nearby Neuchâtel (then under Prussia), saying they would refound Geneva elsewhere along with industrious fellow-citizens. The invaders imposed a new constitution on Geneva entrenching the aristocracy. This caused many Genevans to emigrate and try to build a new Geneva at, for example, Waterford, Cologne or Brussels. Many radical émigrés went on to do great things, such as participating in the French Revolution (1789–1799).

During the French Revolution period, aristocratic and democratic factions again contended for control of Geneva. In 1798, however, France, then under the Directory, annexed Geneva and its surrounding territory.

== 19th century ==
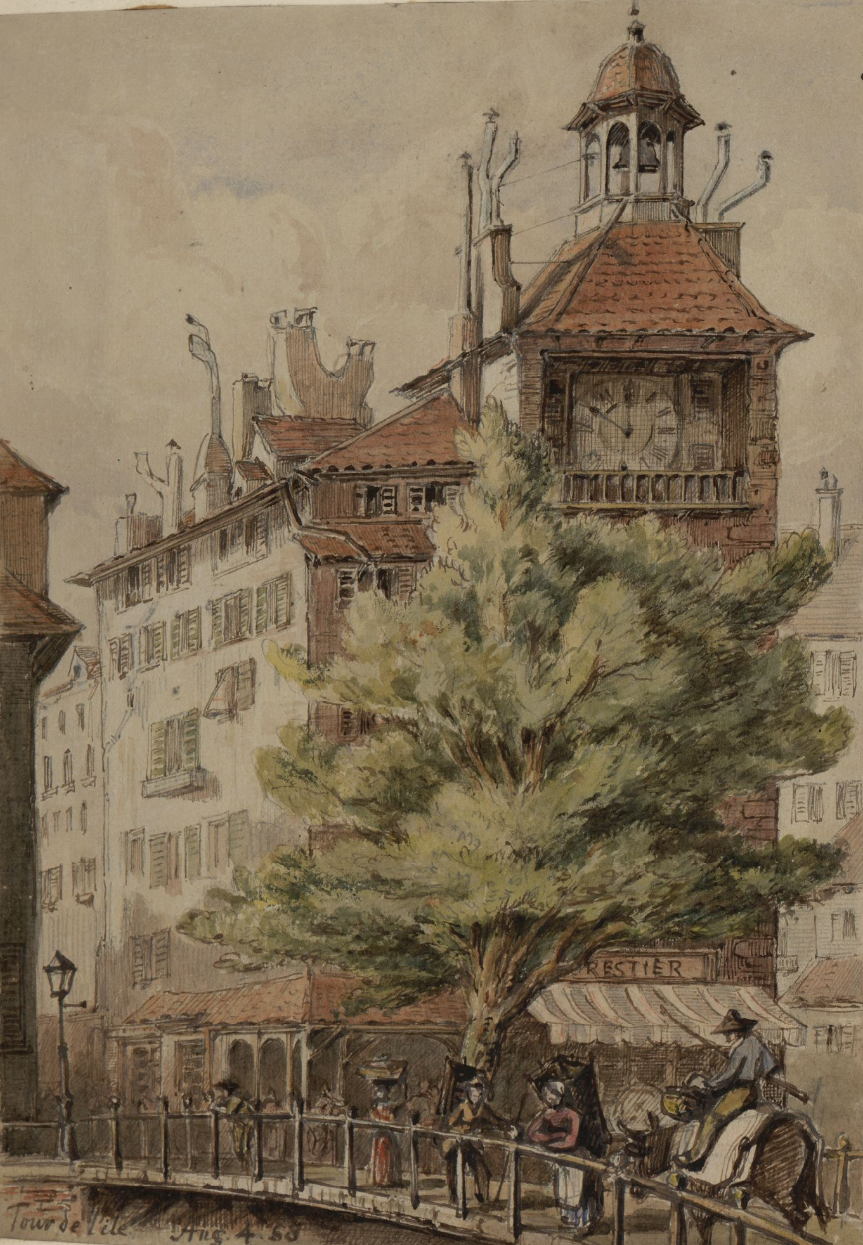
Geneva, sketched by Frances Elizabeth Wynne in August 1858

In 1802, the diocese was united with that of Chambéry. The defeat of Napoleonic armies and liberation of Geneva in 1813 by the Austrian general Ferdinand von Bubna und Littitz restored its independence. At the Congress of Vienna of 1814–15, the territory of Geneva was extended to cover 15 Savoyard and six French parishes, with more than 16,000 Catholics; at the same time it was admitted to the Swiss Confederation. The Congress expressly provided—and the same proviso was included in the Treaty of Turin (16 March 1816)—that in these territories transferred to Geneva the Catholic religion was to be protected, and that no changes were to be made in existing conditions without the approval of the Holy See. The city's neutrality was guaranteed by the Congress. Pius VII in 1819 united the city of Geneva and 20 parishes with the Diocese of Lausanne, while the rest of the ancient Diocese of Geneva (outside of Switzerland) was reconstituted, in 1822, as the French Diocese of Annecy.

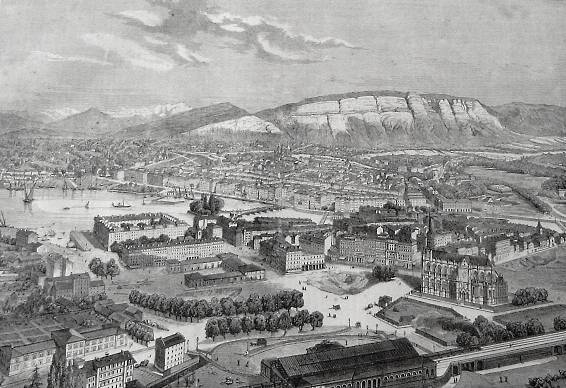
View of Geneva in 1860

The Great Council of Geneva (cantonal council) afterwards ignored the responsibilities thus undertaken; in imitation of Napoleon's "Organic Articles", it insisted upon the Placet, or previous approval of publication, for all papal documents. Catholic indignation ran high at the civil measures taken against Marilley, the parish priest of Geneva and later bishop of the see, and at the Kulturkampf, which obliged them to contribute to the budget of the Protestant Church and to that of the Old Catholic Church, without providing any public aid for Catholicism.

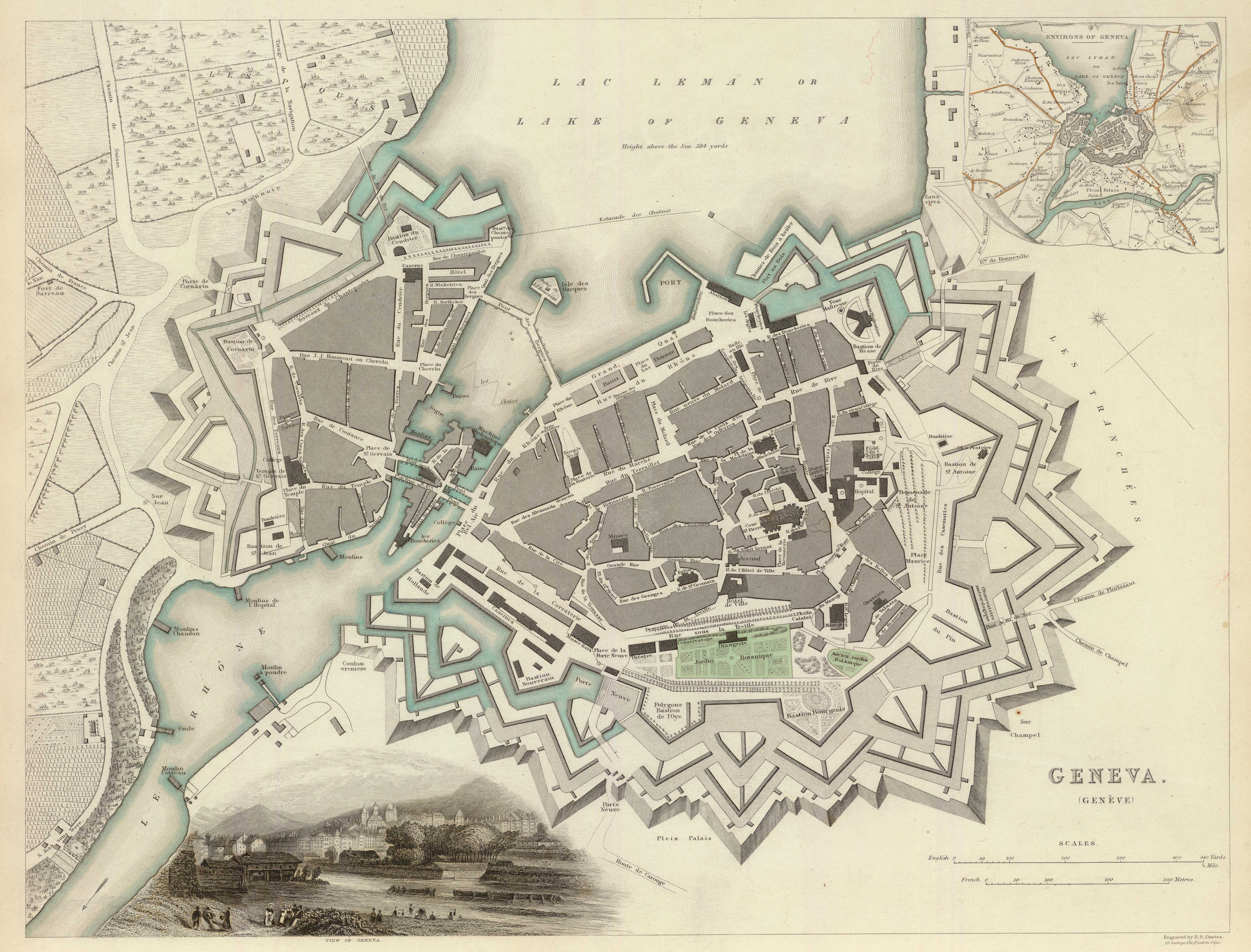
Map of Geneva and surroundings in 1841. The colossal fortifications were demolished ten years later.

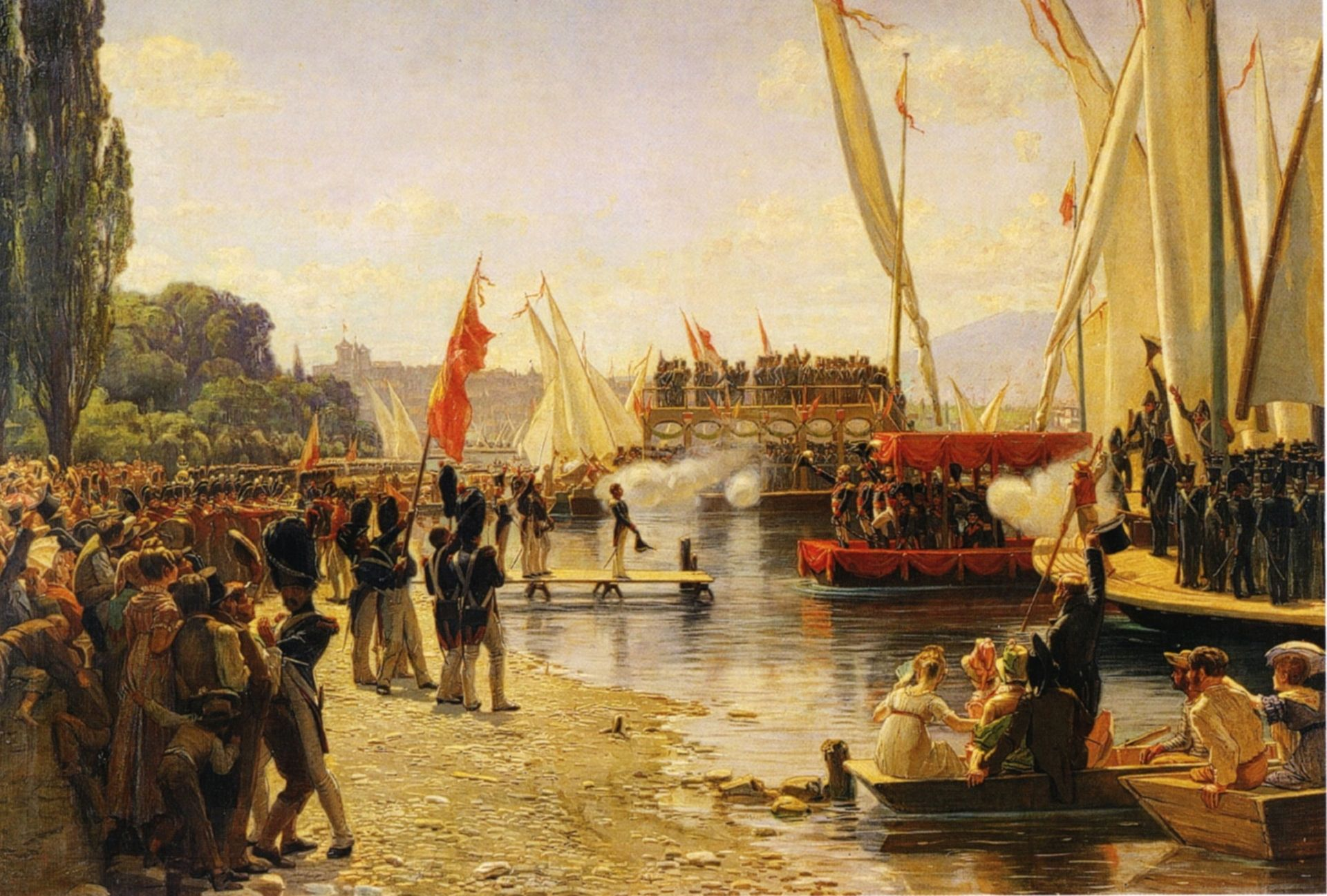
Swiss Army in Geneva on June 1, 1814 (painting from 1880 by Frédéric Dufaux)

== 20th century ==
On 30 June 1907, aided by strong Catholic support, Geneva adopted a separation of church and state. The Protestant faith received a one-time compensatory sum of 800,000 Swiss francs, while other faiths received nothing. Since then the Canton of Geneva has given aid to no creed from either state or municipal revenues.

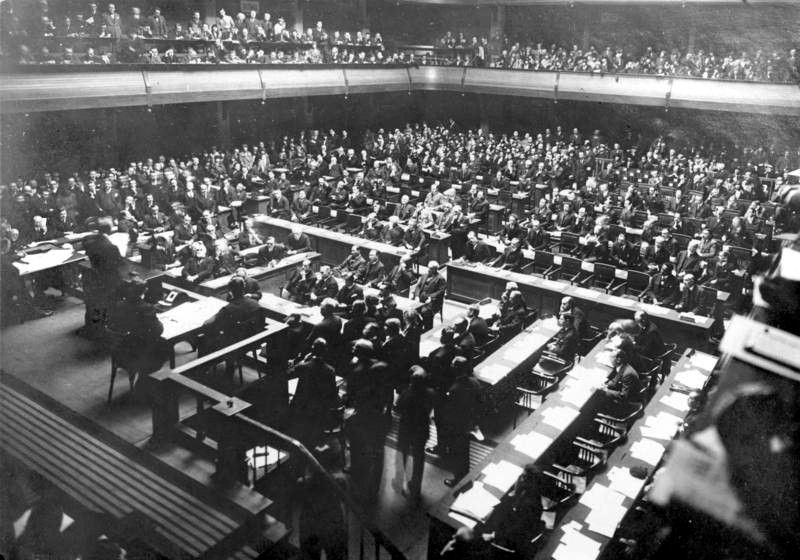
League of Nations conference in 1926

The international status of the city was highlighted after World War I when Geneva became the seat of the League of Nations in 1919—notably through the work of the Federal Council member Gustav Ador and of Swiss diplomat William Rappard, who was one of the founders of the Graduate Institute of International and Development Studies, Europe's oldest graduate school of international and development studies. Furthermore, the International School of Geneva, the oldest currently operating International School in the world, was founded in 1924 by senior members of the League of Nations and the International Labor Office.

In the wake of the war, a class struggle in Switzerland grew and culminated in a general strike throughout the country—beginning on Armistice Day, 11 November 1918, and directed from the German-speaking part of the nation. However the prevailing friendliness toward France in Geneva moderated its effect upon that city.

On 9 November 1932, several small Fascist-inspired political parties, such as the National Union, attacked Socialist leaders, which action led to a later demonstration of the Left against the Fascists. Recruits in the Swiss Army fired without warning into a crowd, leaving thirteen dead and 63 wounded. As a result, a new general strike was called several days later in protest.

After World War II, the European headquarters of the United Nations and the seats of dozens of international organizations were installed in Geneva, resulting in the development of tourism and of business.

In the 1960s, Geneva became one of the first parts of Switzerland in which the rights movements achieved a certain measure of success. It was the third canton to grant women's suffrage on the cantonal and communal levels.

== See also ==
- Timeline of Geneva
- Bourgeois of Geneva
- Outline of Switzerland
- Calvin Auditory, a chapel in Geneva that played a significant role in the Reformation
- Lausanne and Geneva bishopric(s)
