= Republic of Geneva =

European city-state (1534–1798; 1813–1815)

Republic of Geneva République de Genève (French)
- 1534–1798; 1813–1815
- Flag Coat of arms
- Motto: Post tenebras lux ("Light after darkness")
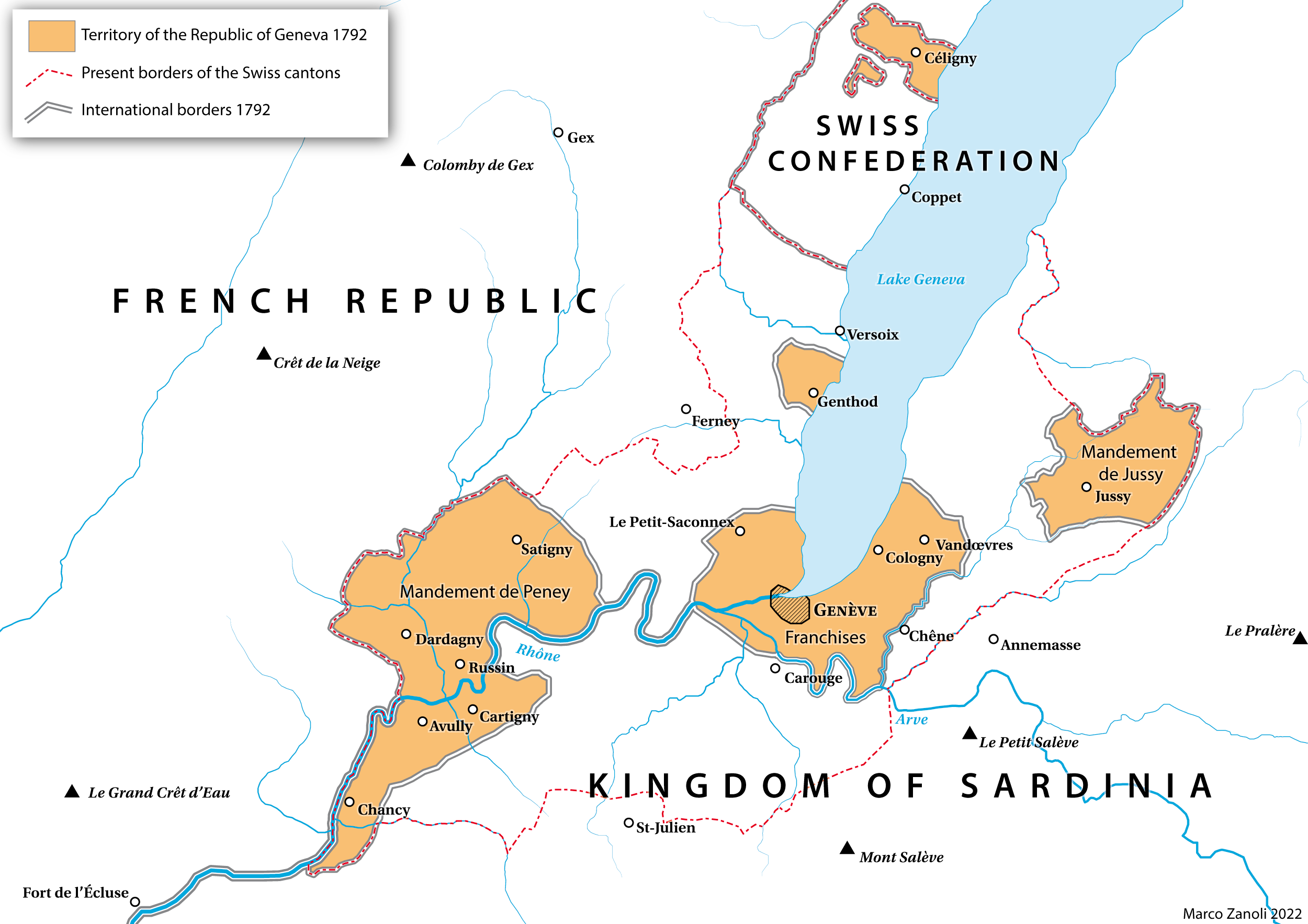
- The Republic of Geneva in 1792
- Status: Associate state of the Old Swiss Confederacy
- Capital: Geneva
- Common languages: French, Genevois
- Religion: Calvinism (official)
- Government: Classical republic under an oligarchy
- Syndics
  - 1534 (first): Michel Sept, Jean-Ami Curtet, Ami de Chapeaurouge, François Duvillard
  - 1815 (last): Ami Lullin, Isaac Pictet, Joseph Des Arts, Pierre-Henri Gourgas
  - Upper chamber: Grand Council
  - Executive council: Small Council
- Historical era: Early modern period
  - Independence from the Prince-Bishopric of Geneva: 1534
  - Adoption of the Reformation: 21 May 1536
  - Treaty of Saint-Julien: 21 July 1603
  - Annexation by France: 15 April 1798
  - Restoration of the Republic: 31 December 1813
  - Accession to the Swiss Confederation: 19 May 1815

Population
  - 1814 census: 48,671
- Currency: Geneva thaler Genevoise (1794–1795)
Preceded by	Succeeded by
Prince-Bishopric of Geneva; 1813: French Empire	1798: French Republic; Swiss Confederation
- Today part of: Switzerland

The Republic of Geneva (French: République de Genève) was an independent city-state in present-day Switzerland that emerged in the early 16th century following its break with both the Catholic Church, the political authority of the Bishop of Geneva, and the political influence of the House of Savoy. Strongly influenced by the Protestant Reformation, and particularly by the work of Guillaume Farel and later John Calvin, the city became a leading center of Calvinism and a refuge for Protestants from across Europe. Politically, Geneva developed republican institutions modeled on some of the Swiss cities, asserting its sovereignty against the Duchy of Savoy and navigating a precarious position between powerful neighbors such as France and the Swiss cantons.

From its declaration of independence in 1534 until its annexation by revolutionary France in 1798, Geneva evolved into a prosperous hub of trade, finance, watchmaking, and publishing, while maintaining a distinctive identity as both a fortified “Protestant Rome” and a cosmopolitan republic. The republic was restored in 1813, and briefly existed again before joining the Swiss Confederation as a canton in 1815.

== History ==
=== Formation ===
At the beginning of the sixteenth century, Geneva was formally governed by the prince-bishop of Geneva, but civic power was increasingly exercised by councils of citizens, creating tensions between episcopal authority, the influence of the neighboring House of Savoy, and the city’s municipal institutions.

The relations between the House of Savoy and Geneva’s civic authorities had been declining through the late fifteenth century but this came to the fore in 1513, when Charles III secured the papal appointment of his relative Jean de Savoie as bishop. Opposition to Savoyard influence coalesced in the faction of the Eidguenots, led by Besançon Hugues and Philibert Berthelier, who sought closer ties with the Old Swiss Confederacy. Their opponents, favouring accommodation with Savoy, were derisively called Mammelus after the Mamluks of Cairo. The execution of Berthelier in 1519 and Amé Lévrier in 1524 weakened the Eidguenots, many of whom fled to Fribourg.

In 1525 they secured an alliance with Fribourg and Bern, aided by Bern’s shift away from Savoy following the Perpetual Peace (1516) with France. The treaty was ratified in Geneva in February 1526, despite the protests of the bishop Pierre de la Baume and the Mammelus. After violent reprisals against their rivals, the Eidguenots gained control of the city, while the bishop permanently departed in 1533. From bases in the Pays de Vaud, Savoyard supporters continued to threaten Geneva, culminating in failed assaults in 1529 and 1530. Berne and Fribourg intervened with several thousand troops, forcing a treaty that ended the attacks but at heavy financial cost to the city. These struggles set the stage for Geneva’s eventual declaration of independence from episcopal and Savoyard authority in 1534.

=== Early Reformation ===
At the time of the alliance with the confederates in 1525, there were few Protestants in Geneva, and many of them were Huguenot refugees from France. Bern, however, had converted to Protestantism in 1528. Bernese troops displayed a brutal conviction in their new faith by destroying images, statues, and other objects of worship. The troops quickly spread Protestant ideas, and in 1532, supported by Bern, Guillaume Farel arrived at the city to preach the new faith.

Meanwhile, the authorities had been reforming the governing bodies of the city. In 1526, they set up a Council of Two Hundred, emulating the Swiss model. In 1528, the right to appoint the 4 mayors ("syndics") was granted to the Council of Two Hundred, which also received, from 1530, the task to appoint the members of the Little Council (between 12 and 20 magistrates led by the 4 mayors), which itself appointed the members of the Council of Two Hundred. This circular election system characterised the government system of Geneva until 1792. So it was that when in 1533 the Bishop Pierre de la Baume arrived to Geneva to exercise his right of justice on the murder of a canon, he expressed his opposition to the new Councils by leaving the city forever. He then sided with Charles III, and in August 1534, he excommunicated the city. In response, the city authorities declared in October of the same year the vacancy of the Bishopric and claimed for themselves all signorial rights (to make laws, to declare war and peace, to mint coin etc.). This act of independence marked the birth of the Republic of Geneva, then still mostly confined to the city and the few medieval territories gifted to the Bishops, the largest of which were Satigny, Peney, and an area around modern-day Jussy.

In addition, owing to the increased rate of conversions to Protestantism, on the 21 May 1536, the General Council of Geneva fully adopted the Reformation and confiscated all the assets of the Catholic Church. With this decision, the commune of Geneva, the civil authority of the city, merged with new institutions, including the territories that depended on the Bishop, the mandements. As a response, the Catholic Canton of Fribourg broke its alliance with the city.

Charles III took advantage of the tumultuous situation in Geneva to attempt to conquer the city in 1535–36, but coming to the aid of Geneva, a new army of Bernese in alliance with France defeated Savoy. It occupied the lands of Savoy in the Genevan basin (including all the Pays de Gex), marking the end of the Duchy as a threat to Geneva and the recognition of Geneva's sovereignty. This was not without risk to Geneva, given how Bernese troops conquered Lausanne despite the cities' alliance.

=== John Calvin ===
In the summer of 1536, John Calvin, a then 26-year old French theologian, spent some time in Geneva and was convinced by William Farel to stay and establish together a new Church. In January 1537 they presented their project to the mayors, who were initially reluctant to adopt Farel and Calvin's ideas of a Church that would again take control over the city, and were also displeased by both men's refusal to adopt some of the Lutheran liturgy. In April 1538, as the government was torn between supporters of state religion following the Bernese model, and supporters of French reformation, the authorities asked both of the men to leave the city. However, soon after in September 1541, Calvin was asked by Geneva to return. Upon his arrival he began to leave his mark on Church with the Ecclesiastical Ordinances and, although he had no official role other than Head of the Ministers, he outmanouvered political opponents to redact part of the Civil Edicts (Édits Civils) in 1543, a sort of constitution, which fixed the form of government, the electoral rules, and powers of the members of the Councils. These two texts, revised over time, governed the Republic until the end of the 18th century.

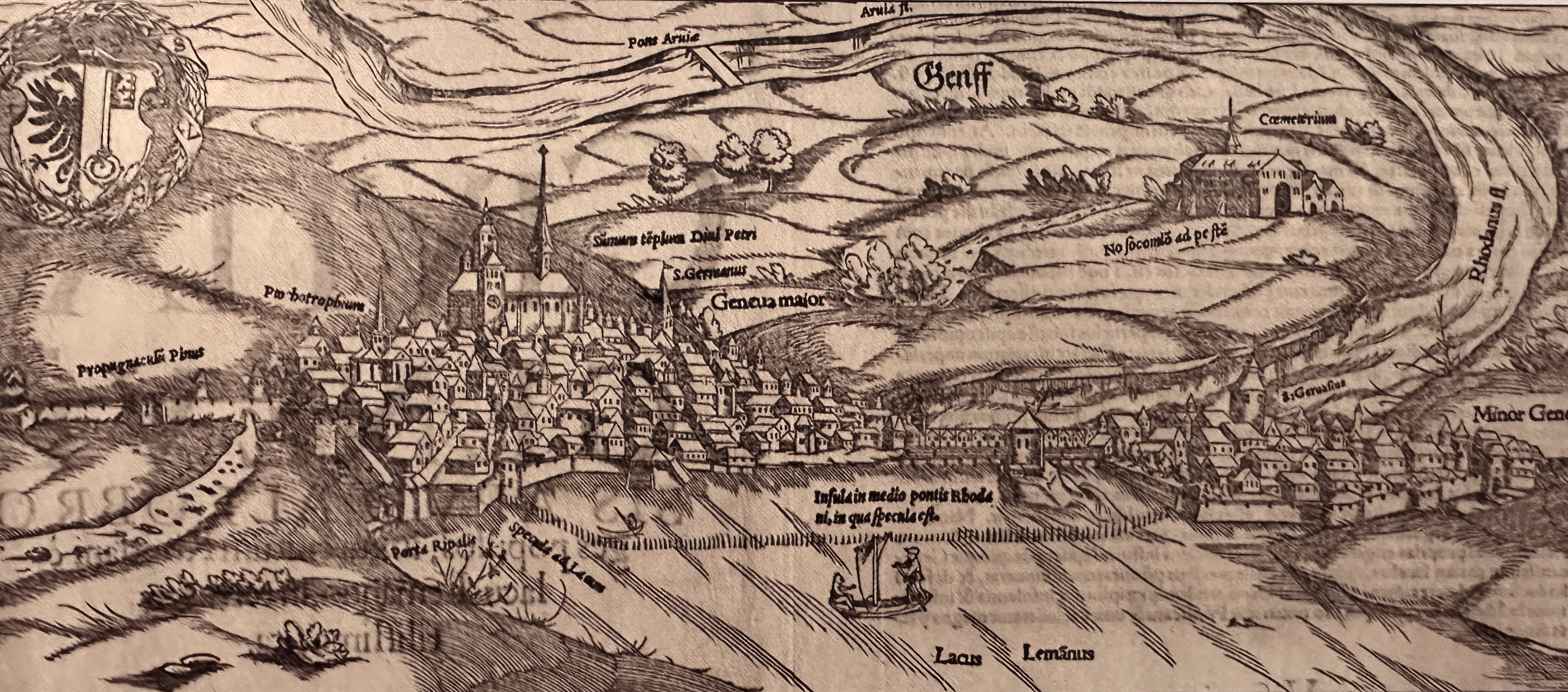
View of Geneva in 1550 from the lake, showing the main city on the hill and the bridge linking it to Saint-Gervais on the right bank of the Rhone river

If the political Edicts brought only minor changes to prior dispositions adopted over the previous decades, the Ecclesiastical Ordinances revolutionised the organisation of religious institutions. Thus, the creation of the Consistory launched the period that some historians call the "regime of moral terror" with numerous prohibitions that were severely applied, such as in the sentencing to the pyre of theologian and doctor Michael Servetus in 1553 for heresy, or the marginalisation of ancient, pro-Bernese and anti-French bourgeois families in 1555. The removal of this last opposition marked the end of Geneva's distinctive identity founded on the memory of the fights for independence and conviviality practices that Calvin could not tolerate.

=== Protestant refuge ===
Internationally, thanks to Calvin's religious reforms, Geneva becomes a beacon for the reformation, attracting thousands of Protestant refugees from all over Europe, but especially from France and to a lesser extent Italy and Spain. With the influx of refugees, the population grew from 10,000 residents in 1550 to 25,000 in 1560. However, many of the new arrivals did not want or could not relocate permanently, and the population stabilised around 14,000 by 1572. Like in other cities in the Swiss landscape, the rights to live in the city was highly organised as follows:

- Habitant (resident): those with the right to live in the Geneva, to acquire goods and to practice all trades except liberal professions;
- The children of habitants were natifs (natives), with limited economic and political rights;
- Bourgeois, the sole status that conferred the political rights to participate in the conseil général, and be eligible for the Council of Two-Hundred. The right to become bourgeois had to be granted by the council, in addition to having to buy the letter of Bourgeoisie, which would fetch for 50 to 100 florins in the second half of the 16th century and jump to over 8,000 florins by the mid-18th century;
- Citoyens (citizens), the children of bourgeois if they were born in the city.

In an effort to attract talent, from 1537 the Republic granted the status of bourgeois cheaply to teachers, doctors, musicians, to the stonemasons who contributed to the construction of the new fortifications, and even for free to jurists, priests, professors, and schoolmasters. The main impacts on the city from the refugees that were therefore attracted would be cultural with the influence of the French language that would gradually replace the local Franco-Provençal language, and economic. Initially this opening to foreigners would attract professions that served the local economy such as stonemasons, tailors, shoemakers, or carpenters. But from the 1550s, thanks to the skills brought for the refugees the economy developed export industries such as fabrics and printing. Printing in particular grew very fast, with the arrival of famous printers such as Jean Crespin or Robert Estienne, employing over 200 workers during Calvin's time before many of the printers moved to Lyon when that city also became for a time Protestant. In the second half of the century, other industries develop, notably gilding and watchmaking.

=== Conflicts with Savoy ===
After the defeat of Charles III by French and Bernese forces, Savoy had temporarily given up on its efforts to take Geneva. However, in the second half of the 16th century the Duchy allied with Spain and regained some of its power. The son of Charles III, Emmanuel Philibert, defeated the army of King Henry II of France at the Battle of Saint-Quentin in 1557 and recovered the lands conquered by the French in 1535. In 1559, in the Treaty of Cateau-Cambrésis, France restored an independent Savoy. However, Bern did not participate in the initial negotiations, and only in the Treaty of Lausanne of 1564 did Savoy recover the lands around Geneva, while losing definitively the Pays de Vaud to Bern. Until his death, Emmanuel-Philibert practiced tolerance with his non-Catholic subjects and largely respected the "cujus regio, ejus religio" principle for Geneva. However, the Genevan authorities were highly suspicious and worked towards obtaining the support of Catholic Solothurn and France, who agree to protect the city against potential attacks from Savoy.

In effect, the threats to the city materialised with Emmanuel-Philibert's son, Charles Emmanuel I, who dreamt of conquering the city and began plotting against Protestants, employing mercenaries to intimidate those converted by Bernese preachers. Intensifying its diplomatic efforts, Geneva formed an alliance with the canton of Zürich in 1584.

Between 1586 and 1587 large outbreaks of the plague affected Geneva and Savoy, which came coupled with bad harvests and famines affecting the continent. In these conditions, it was difficult to supply with food the 15,000 inhabitants of the city, despite diplomatic efforts to seek help from its allies. The Council forbid the production of white bread and pastries and banned some residents from the city. The catastrophe affected Savoy equally, and in response Charles Emmanuel I forbid the export of grains from his lands, which in essence initiated a blockade of Geneva, since the city was surrounded by the Duchy except for what goods could be imported by the lake.

In response, Geneva, supported by France and a contingent of 12,000 Swiss soldiers, intermittently occupied the Pays de Gex from 1589, but the city was finally forced to abandon it when France defeated Savoy and annexed the Pays de Gex for itself in the 1601 Treaty of Lyon. This marked the point where most of Geneva's hinterland was divided between two strong states along the Rhone banks: the Kingdom of France on the right, and the Duchy of Savoy on the left. This event, and the prior domination of the area by Savoy and the Counts of Geneva, largely explains why the Republic of Geneva, unlike the Swiss urban cantons, was unable to expand geographically, as its borders were dominated by those two powerful states.

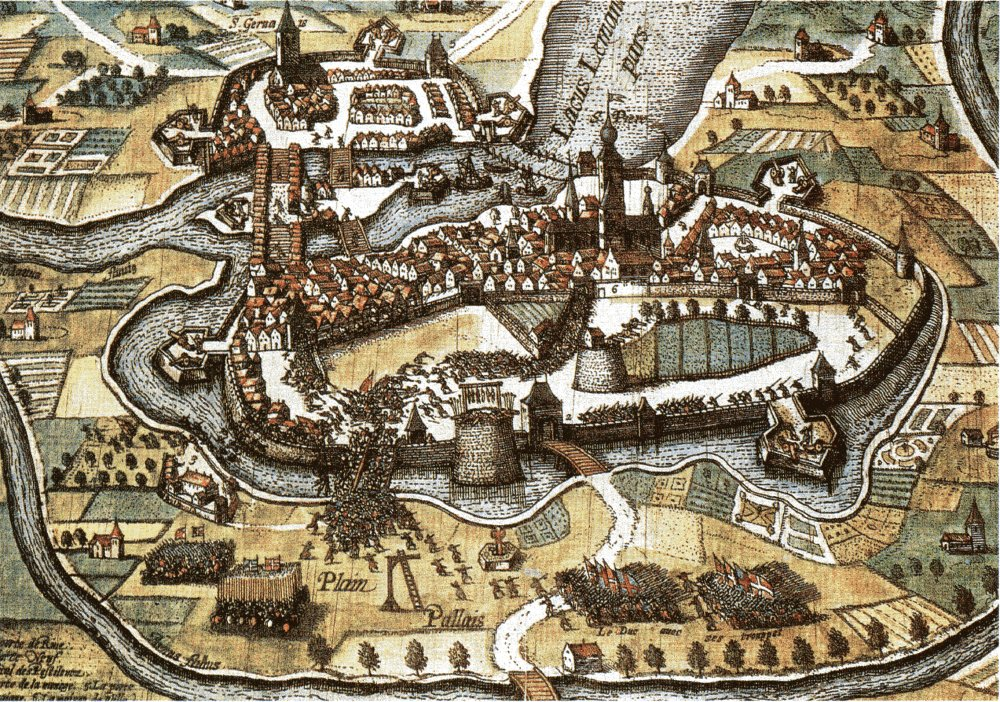
L'Escalade, the last attempt by Savoy to take Geneva by force, 1602

Unwilling to give up on the city, Savoy launched one last attempt to conquer Geneva during the events of the Escalade in 1602. This incursion against the “Protestant Rome” would paradoxically lead to the recognition of the city's independence. The negotiations between Savoy and Geneva from spring 1603 were successfully completed in July the same year with the treaty of Saint-Julien. Thanks to the arbitration provided by several Swiss cantons as well as France, the Republic obtained a very advantageous deal that politically placed the city in equal terms with Savoy. In addition, it obtained economic (free commerce and exemption from taxes on real estate located in Savoy owned by Genevan residents) and military rights (prohibition from building any military facilities and from keeping any garrison on a 15-km radius around the city), that would guarantee the city's independence and prosperity. In addition, Geneva also obtained an annual subsidy from France, and a permanent garrison funded by the Kingdom.

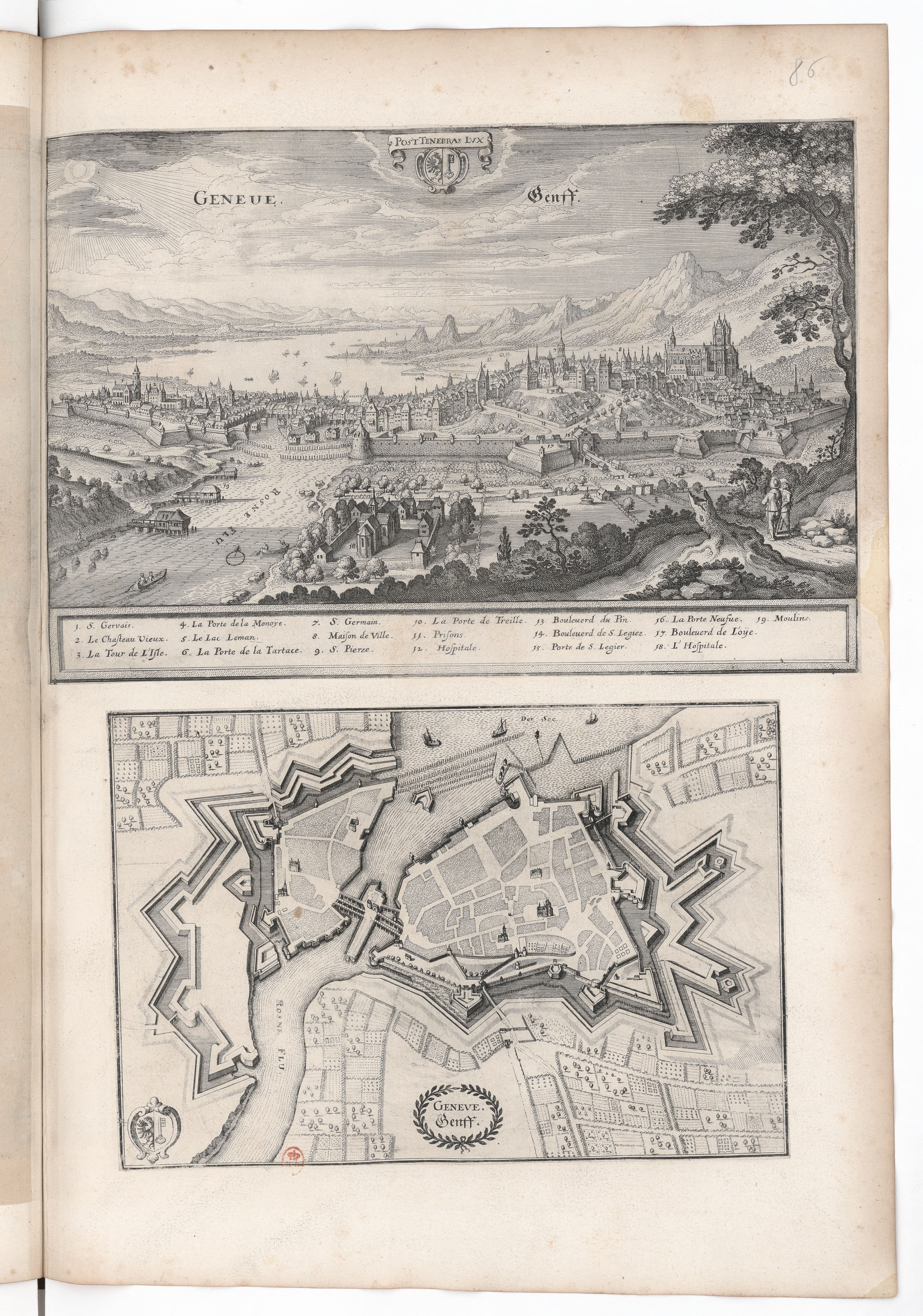
Geneva's fortifications by mid-17th century

=== Role of France ===
Since then, both Savoy and France largely respected Geneva's independence, protected by its strong fortresses, and guaranteed by its alliance with the Protestant cantons of the Old Swiss Confederacy of Zürich and Bern. Nevertheless, the threats to the Republic's existence did not disappear, particularly as France switched its European alliances and the Kings became less tolerant of Protestants. Threatened by these changing winds and traumatised by the events of the Escalade, Geneva enlarged and professionalised its permanent garrison (from 300 soldiers in 1603 to over 700 a century later) and fortified itself behind mighty walls that become increasingly claustrophobic as the lands in Chablais and the Pays de Gex were progressively converted back to Catholicism by the future Bishop and Saint Francis de Sales from 1594, who even entered the city de incognito in an attempt to convince Theodore de Beze to hold a public debate on religion. The authorities found themselves unable to respond to the Catholic threat, as they could not afford to irritate the French king, and at the same time the local economy increasingly depended on the use of Catholics as domestic labour and in the textile industry.

Playing now on the defensive, the Republic multiplied the number of population surveys to track poor Catholics and beggars, while it was forced to accept in 1679 by king Louis XIV the presence of a permanent representative who demanded to be allowed to celebrate the Catholic Mass in his home for his workers and neighbours, dealing a blow to the city's religious purity, particularly because the first representative, Laurent de Chavingy was very provocative.

In 1681, as France annexed Strasbourg, Geneva fears for the worst and the councils must skilfully navigate the diplomatic situation to safeguard the Republic's independence. The major advantages that the councillors had for this task were on the one hand the strategic position of the city, as France was interested in keeping the status quo with Savoy as well as in respecting Geneva's alliance with the Swiss cantons in order to maintain the supply of Swiss mercenaries, and on the other hand economic interests given that the city was centrally located in the trade routes linking north and south, and that it provided a significant amount of capital to finance France's debt. Tensions were highest during the 1685 second wave of Huguenot refugees forced into exile after the revocation of the Nantes edict since Geneva was a favored passage for the refugees heading to Switzerland and historians estimate that between 100,000 and 120,000 huguenots transited through the city. Buoyed by the economic prosperity and relative peace between 1654 and 1688, when France went to war against the league of Augsburg and blockaded its enemies, Geneva provided much aid to the refugees, some of whom permanently moved to the city and helped to develop new industries such as indiennes and contributed to the watchmaking industry, displeasing France in the process.

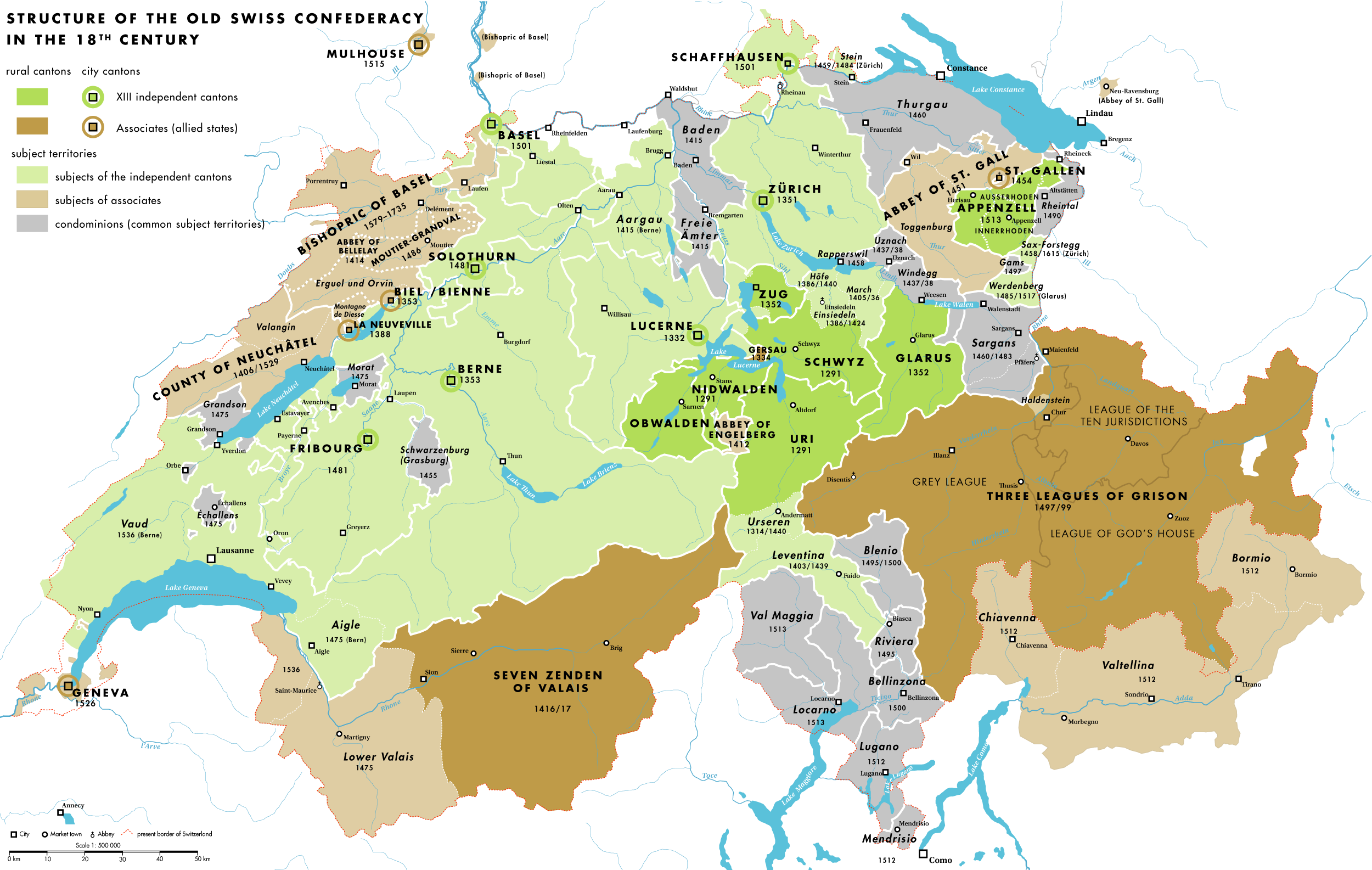
The cantons and allies of the Old Swiss Confederacy in the 18th century. Geneva is a group of small territories in the southwest.

No major changes occurred in Geneva's borders until 1749. In an effort to rationalise the borders marked by the medieval territories gifted to the Bishops in the Middle Ages, the Republic and France exchanged territories in that year: Geneva swapped its rights over Challex, Thoiry, Fenières, and some enclaves it possed in the Pays de Gex, for Chancy, Avully, and Russin. In a similar treaty with Savoy in 1754, Geneva received from Savoy Cartigny, Jussy, Vandoeuvres, Gy, and some other smaller territories, in exchange for its rights on Carouge, Veyrier, Onex, Lancy, Bossey, Presinge, and others. During the baroque and classical periods, Europe saw the emergence of several planned towns. Save for the reconstruction of towns destroyed by fires (such as Schwyz in 1642, Sion in 1788, or La Chaux-de-Fonds in 1794), Switzerland did not jump on this trend mostly circumscribed to the large monarchies and princely states. However, the desire to possess or weaken Geneva by France and Savoy provides two good examples of this urban planning, both of which are now Genevan towns. In the 18th century under Louis XV, France intended to build a large port city in Versoix to deviate the traffic en route to Lake Geneva and from there to the Swiss confederation. The city, intended for around 30,000 inhabitants, would have been bigger than Geneva (by then the largest Swiss city) and included large squares and ports. Voltaire, who had settled in Ferney, was particularly rejoiced about the idea of ruining Geneva. However, opposition from Bern to a new fortified town in its border in Pays de Gex, and budgetary problems in France, finally stopped the project of which few items finally were built and survive. A more lasting project was launched by Savoy in 1777, which transformed Carouge into the gateway to the northern provinces and conferred the village the status of city in 1786. The planned city was particularly innovative in the way that streets were symmetrically laid and by the total absence of fortifications.

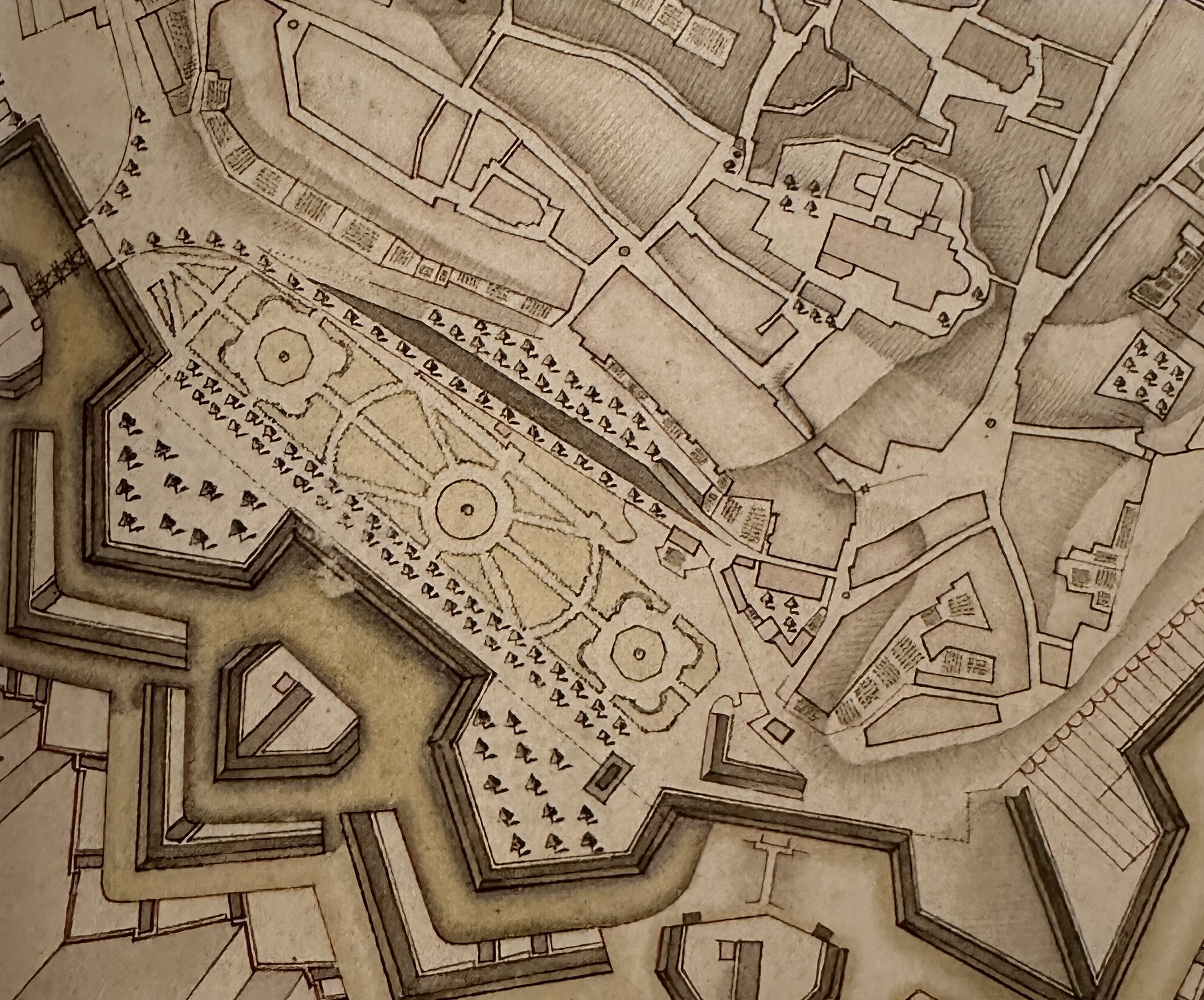
Detail of the Parc des Bastions in 1752, in a map ordered by Pierre Mouchon

=== Protestant Rome ===
After the aura of a highly fortified "Protestant Rome", came an image during the 18th century of a very wealthy, elegant city behind its walls. Except for the periods of crises from the Great Plague of Marseille and the crash of the John Law monetary system in France, the century was prosperous until 1785, driven by the production and exports of luxury goods, most notably watches. Between 1760 and 1790, the watchmaking industry employs around 4,000 workers, a third of the men residents. During the century, the government also invests in public parks, most notably the Bastions park in 1720, one of the earliest examples of a public park in Europe created from the start for the public and by the public authorities; in beautifying the city, improving the public lighting amongst others.

In a latter in 1775 the writer and philosopher Georges Sulzer wrote "Mr Bonnet was kind enough to accompany me to Geneva. It is well known that this city is, in proportion to its size, one of the richest in Europe. Its avenues already announce its opulence; everything indicates a people who live in the midst of abundance. Nowhere have I seen so many country houses as in the territory of this little Republic: the banks of the lake are entirely covered with them. These buildings all have a pleasant exterior which announces, if not magnificence, at least the last degree of cleanliness. Each house has its own well-tended gardens, often even vineyards, meadows and ploughed land. The main road was swarming with pedestrians, horses and carriages, and the surroundings were as busy as they are elsewhere on days of great solemnity".

=== Early political upheavel and 1782 revolution ===
At the same time, political troubles were brewing. In 1526 as the Republic institutions were created, most of the power was given to the Council of Two Hundred. However, the Little Council had little by little nibbled its power, the Republic having effectively surrendered the power to the small number of bourgeois who controlled the Little Council. In 1707 the lawyer and member of the Council of Two Hundred Pierre Fatio was executed for his attempt to cut back on the powers of the Little Council, by leading a new faction called the representatives that called for a greater share of powers between the two councils. In addition, owing to increased demographic growth and an increase in the price of bourgeoisie, the proportion of eligible men eligible to the governing councils fell from 28% in 1730 to 18% in 1772, as the majority of the population were then natives and residents, many of whom were educated traders or craftsmen who increasingly rejected being excluded from politics.

With increased realisation of their weight, and supported by Voltaire, the natives joined forces with the faction of representatives to overthrow the councils in April 1782 and start a revolution that would facilitate the acquisition of bourgeois rights by the natives. However, only three months later, Bernese, French, and Savoy troops entered the city to re-appoint the ancient government and undo the reforms.

=== Revolutionary period ===
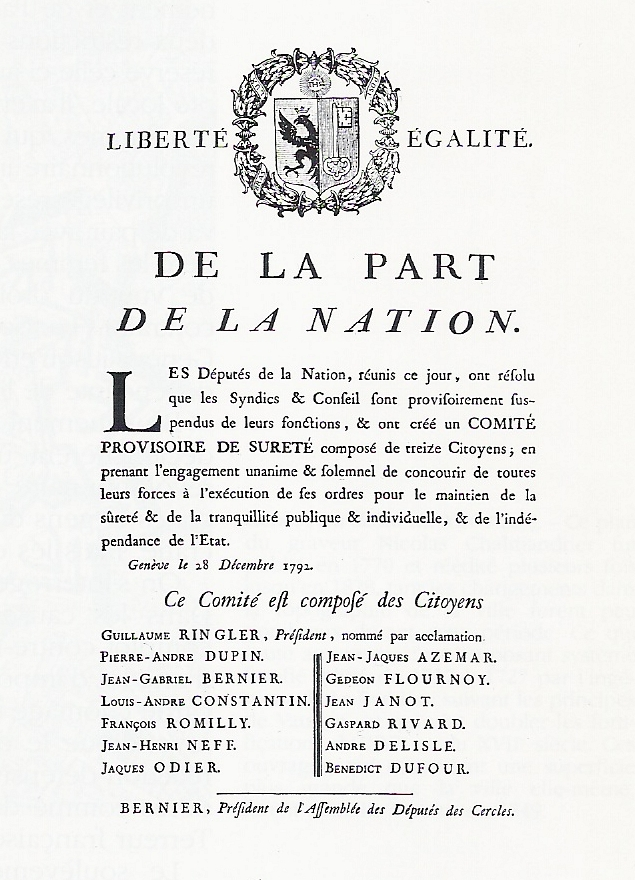
First official declaration by the revolutionary government of Geneva, 28 December 1792

The harsh winter of 1788–1789 and the riots provoked by a spectacular rise in the price of bread made the government fear more serious troubles. An edict issued on 10 February 1789 authorized the return of the exiles of 1782 and revoked several unpopular counter-revolutionary measures. Nevertheless, a new political faction inspired by the French Revolution, known as the egaliseurs, was formed in 1790. The group included natives and inhabitants, as well as a few sympathetic bourgeois and citizens, and demanded equal political rights for all. Concerned by an escalation of the revolts, the government implemented several reforms to appease the population, including the grant of citizenship to natives and residents of the countryside villages.

After the French invasion of Savoy on 23 September 1792, Bernese colonel Wilhelm Bernhard von Muralt, who was appointed supreme commander of Swiss forces by the Federal Diet, led a Confederate army formed mainly of Bernese troops to Geneva and reinforced the city's garrison on 30 September, in response to a request for help issued by the Genevan government. For nearly two months, Genevan and Swiss troops found themselves face to face with a French army, under General Montesquiou, stationed across the Arve river in Carouge. Following lengthy negotiations, the Swiss army withdrew on 27 October after France agreed not to occupy Geneva.

Unrest resumed in Geneva after the National Convention issued a decree on 19 November 1792 promising "fraternity and aid to all peoples who wish to recover their liberty". Encouraged by the French annexation of Savoy in September 1792, the Egaliseurs managed to unite and take control of the Genevan government in December 1792. A first decree established equality between citizens, bourgeois, natives, inhabitants and subjects, putting an end to the old regime represented by the social hierarchy of Geneva. On 5 February 1794, a new constitution was adopted, establishing for the first time the separation of powers, popular sovereignty and direct democracy. In July 1794, extremist political clubs staged an insurrection and took control of the Republic. A revolutionary tribunal sentenced to death thirty-seven aristocrats and their suspected sympathizers, and eleven people were executed by firing squad.

The fall of Maximilien Robespierre in Paris soon afterwards brought an end to the "Genevan Terror", and a second revolutionary tribunal sentenced five extremists to death. In September 1795, an 'act of forgetfulness' annulled all the trials in the revolutionary courts. Old symbols of the Republic of Geneva were restored, and in October 1796 a new, more conservative constitution, was adopted.

=== French annexation ===
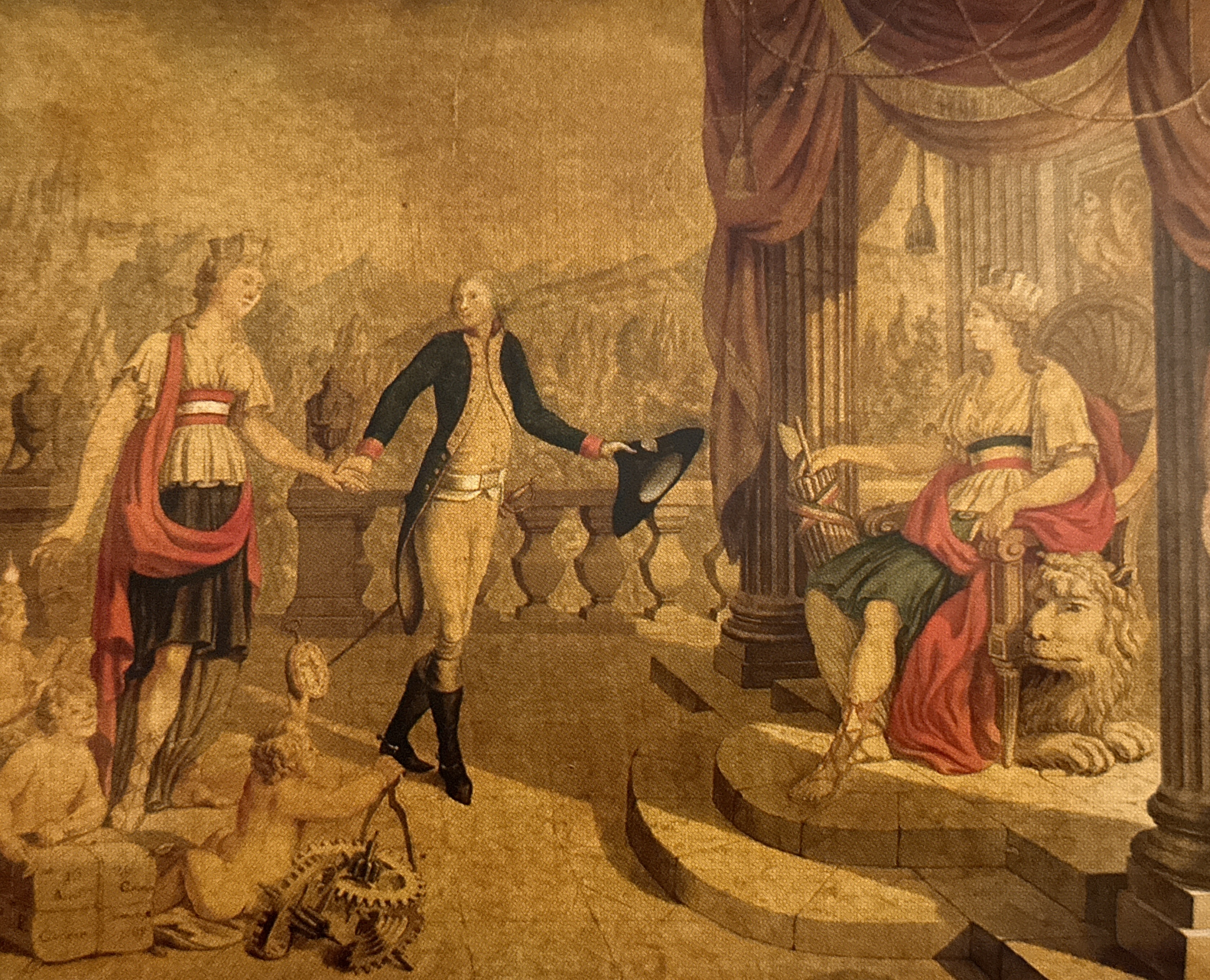
Allegory of the annexation of the Republic of Geneva by France in 1798. Two women face each other, France seated on a throne and Geneva who advances, with a hesitant step, led by the representative of the Directory, Félix Desportes. She has laid her possessions on the ground (letters, trade, and the factory of luxury goods) and makes a gesture of offering to her new sovereign.

Things would quickly evolve when France officially annexed Savoy in the spring 1796. Geneva is increasingly denounced by French as a "den of contrabandists, aristocrats, and emigrants". In January 1798, the French army invades the Swiss confederation and begins a trade embargo on Geneva, but the Directory wishes to annex the city on demand by its citizens and not by force. The wish would be granted on 15 April 1798 when the Genevan government is coerced by economic and political pressure to request the annexation by France. The treaty was relatively favourable to Geneva, whose citizens preserved the assets of the Republic, are left alone in regards to education and the economy, and granted a 5-year exemption from conscription. The city's fortifications are also kept intact and preserved, and the Protestant religion is largely tolerated, although with strict conditions such as the demotion of its status to a simple association.

After long debates in Paris, Geneva is then made capital of a new département du Léman, which resembled the old catholic diocese of Geneva prior to the Protestant reformation.

=== Restoration and accession to the Swiss Confederation ===
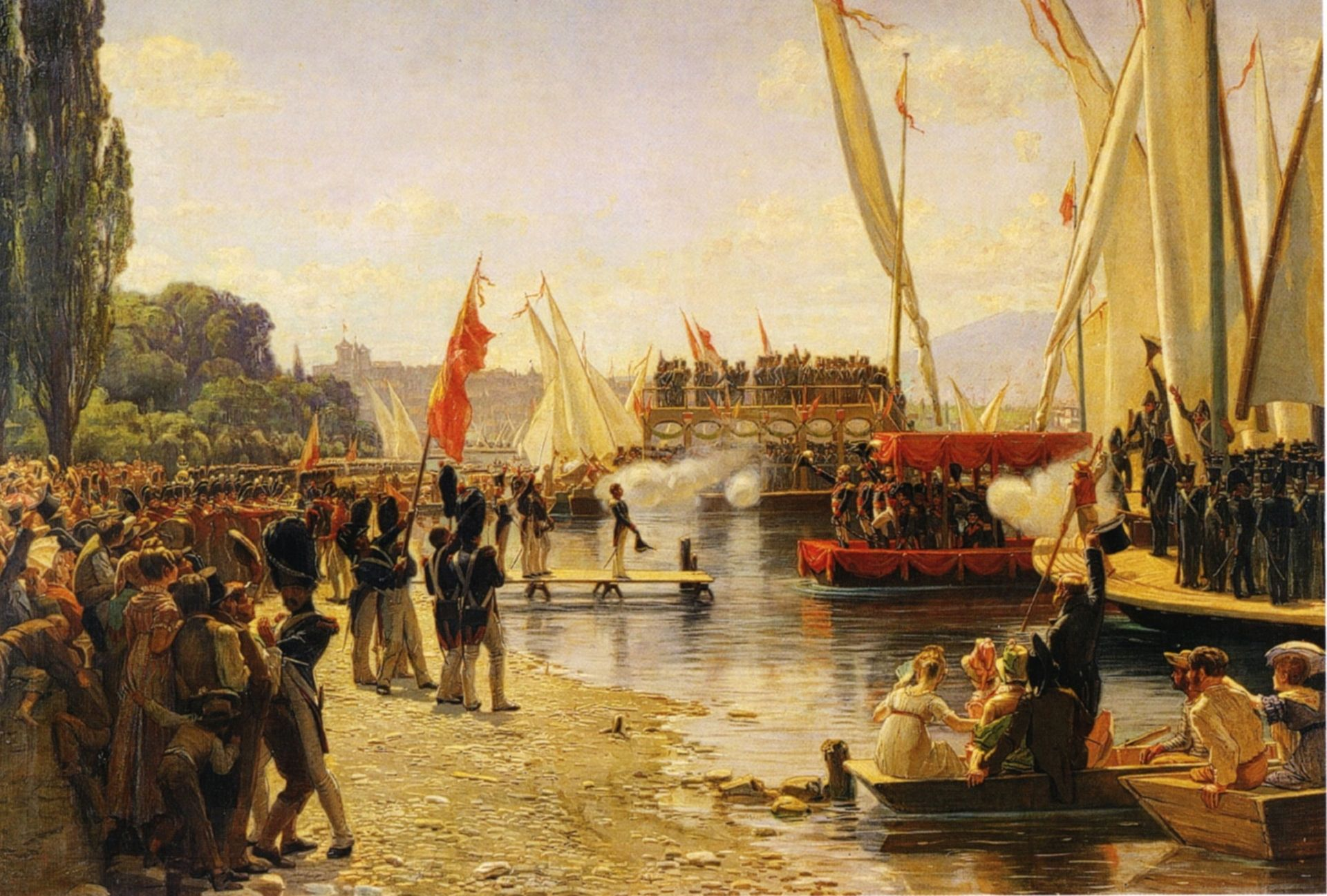
Arrival of Swiss troops at the Port-Noir in Cologny, near Geneva, on 1 June 1814. Painting by Frédéric Dufaux, 1880.

The Napoleonic army left Geneva on 30 December 1813 under pressure from the Austrian general Ferdinand von Bubna und Littitz, and on the next day the return of the Republic (Restauration de la République) was proclaimed.

At the Congress of Vienna of 1814–15, Geneva was admitted as a canton to the Swiss Confederation ending its status as an independent republic. The city's neutrality was guaranteed by the Congress.

Geneva's territory was extended to cover fifteen Savoyard and six French parishes, with more than 16,000 Catholics; at the same time the Congress expressly provided—and the same proviso was included in the Treaty of Turin (16 March 1816)—that in these territories transferred to Geneva the Catholic religion was to be protected, and that no changes were to be made in existing conditions without the approval of the Holy See.

== Economy ==
=== Agriculture ===
Agriculture in the Republic of Geneva was characterized by direct farming and polyculture in small and medium-sized holdings. Wheat fields, pastures for livestock, and vineyards accounted for the majority of available land, except in Geneva's immediate outskirts, where orchards and market gardens helped supply the city's markets. In the 18th century, Genevan landowners, adapting their production to changing prices, tended to reduce their vineyard acreage in favor of grain crops and livestock farming, which offered better returns. However, due to its limited territory, the Republic's countryside never produced enough to meet the population's needs; as a result, Geneva had to import grain, usually from nearby Savoy and France, but sometimes from much further countries, a task entrusted to the Chambre des Blés starting in 1628. Apart from hemp and wool produced (and woven) by peasants for household use, a few white mulberry trees planted sporadically for silk farming, and bark for tanners, Geneva did not cultivate industrial crops useful for its manufacturing sectors, such as flax, woad, or madder.

=== Industry and commerce ===
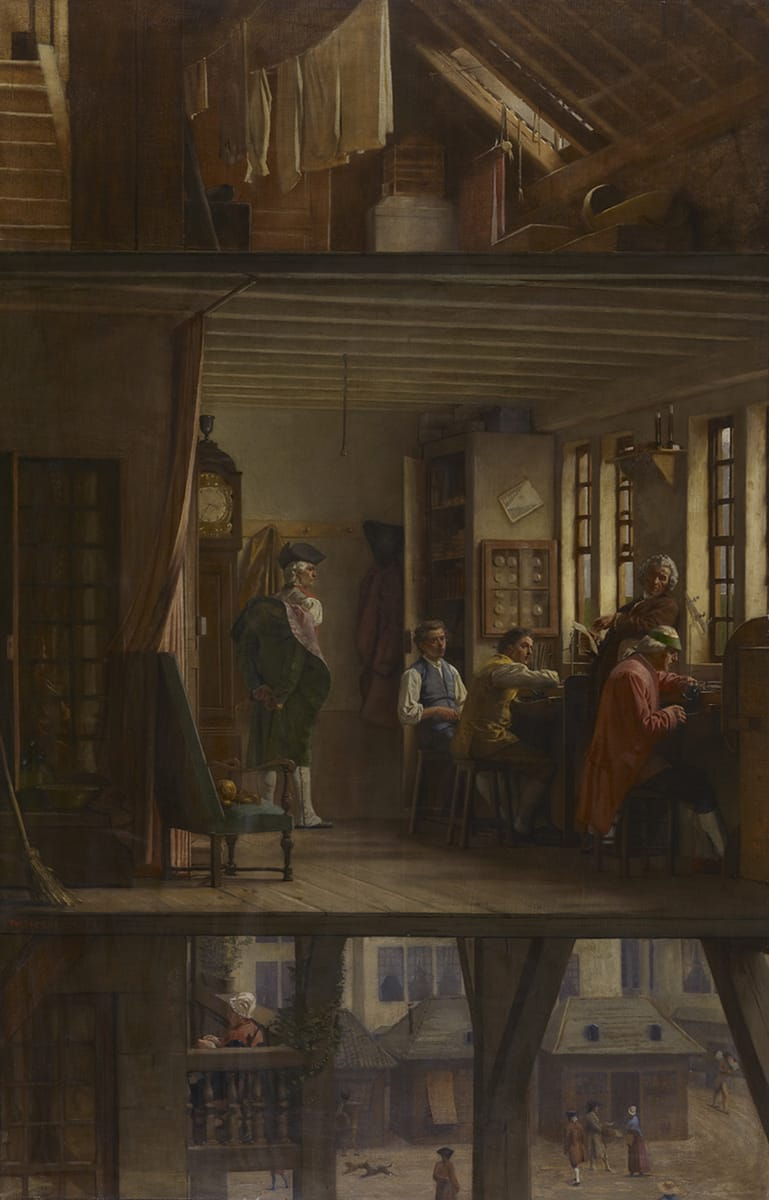
A watchmaker's workshop in 18th-century Geneva. Painting by Christophe François von Ziegler, 1879.

As a city of fairs and a financial hub, Geneva was primarily a centre of commerce during the Middle Ages, while its modest artisanal output was destined mainly for local and regional markets. The arrival of Protestant refugees starting in the 1550s radically transformed the city's manufacturing industry. While leather, metal, wood, and construction trades remained significant, driven largely by population growth, local and regional economic activities were supplanted by silk production (in the form of threads, fabrics, and ribbons), printing, goldsmithing and watchmaking, all of which produced goods for export. New merchant-manufacturers often divided their activities between commerce and the production of books, woolens, and silks. Operating under the putting-out system, they financed lengthy manufacturing processes and commissioned work from various artisans, who were organized into guilds until 1798.

During the 17th and 18th centuries, the Republic's textile trade took on other forms: the silk industry concentrated on the manufacture of gold threads, braids, and laces (gilding) and on the mechanical knitting of stockings, while drapery artisans specialized in the finishing of imported cloths, handling their dyeing as well as shearing. At the end of the ancien régime, the most dynamic sectors of the Genevan economy were the indiennes industry, with its hand-printed fabrics produced in factories in Les Eaux-Vives since 1690, and the luxury goods industry, known locally as the Fabrique, which by then comprised the manufacture of clocks, watches, gold artifacts and jewelry, along with numerous related trades. By contributing technical expertise, capital, and a large workforce—particularly of women and children—Huguenot refugees played a decisive role in the development of these various economic sectors, even though the local bourgeoisie long reserved certain prestigious trades and professions for themselves, and the established guilds did not always manage to adapt to the innovations.

=== International trade and banking ===
The Maison Mallet, a 1720s mansion in Geneva built by the prominent Mallet family of bankers, now home to the International Museum of the Reformation.

Through their knowledge of banking networks and international trade, Protestant merchants from France and Italy enabled Geneva to secure an outstanding position in the large-scale European trade. Genevans amassed substantial wealth by investing in France, England, and the Netherlands, and by financing maritime trade enterprises. Banking activities became a cornerstone of the Republic's economy after 1700, driven by the growth of international trade, the influx of Huguenot refugees following the revocation of the edict of Nantes, and the need to fund the wars of Louis XIV. Genevan bankers (such as Isaac Thellusson), as members of the "Huguenot international" with connections to Paris, Lyon, Amsterdam, and London, engaged in long-term lending (annuities) and laid the foundation for future wealth management banks (such as the modern Lombard Odier and Pictet groups).

By the end of the 18th century, Genevan banks were financing the French monarchy; the French Revolution would subsequently bring about the collapse of several prestigious banking houses. From the late 1780s onwards, a combination of factors such as European protectionism, the French Revolutionary Wars, the collapse of the French assignat currency and the high cost of raw materials and commodities, along with the collapse of the entire life-annuity system and a wave of bankruptcies, plunged the world of Genevan bankers, merchants, and artisans into a crisis from which it would take decades to recover.

== Culture ==
Allegory of Justice by Samuel de Rameru, c. 1652. Painting exhibited at the meeting room of the Small Council in 1664, showing the old Place d'Armes (now Rue du Puits-Saint-Pierre) in Geneva.

As home to the Academy of Geneva, which attracted students from across Europe in the 16th century, the Republic of Geneva first gained renown through its theologians and philosophers, such as Jean-Alphonse Turrettini and Jean-Robert Chouet, and later, in the 18th century, through legal theorists like Jean-Jacques Burlamaqui and scientists, most notably Jean-Louis Calandrini, Gabriel Cramer, Horace Bénédict de Saussure, and Charles Bonnet.

Culturally, government control of public morals and daily life in the Republic inhibited the growth of the fine arts. Genevans initially created art as artisans, engravers, miniaturists, and enamel painters, working within the watchmaking, goldsmithing, and jewelry trades. Towards the end of the ancien régime, however, as the climate became more favorable for the visual arts, several local artists, generally trained abroad and supported by a handful of local patrons, achieved a certain degree of renown; these included Jean-Étienne Liotard, Jean-Pierre Saint-Ours, Marc-Théodore Bourrit, Pierre-Louis De la Rive, Wolfgang-Adam Töpffer, Firmin Massot, and Jacques-Laurent Agasse.

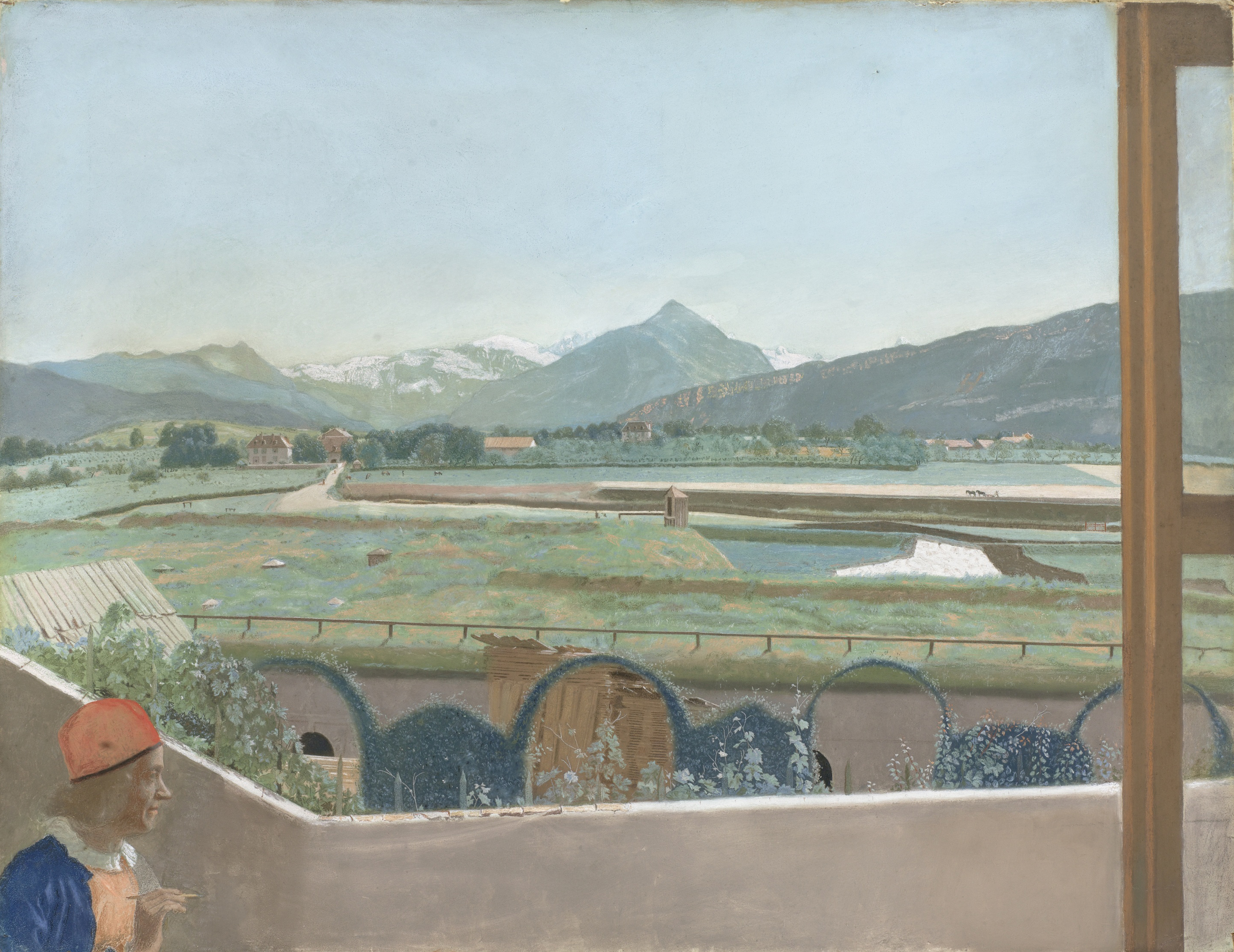
View of the Mont Blanc massif from the artist's studio in Geneva, with a self-portrait. Pastel by Jean-Étienne Liotard, 1765–1770.

Within the field of performing arts, the Reformation in Geneva also marked a radical break from the forms of entertainment enjoyed by the population during the Middle Ages; during the 16th century, theatre was limited to the religious and political spheres, consisting largely of plays featuring biblical or allegorical figures. It was only during the second half of the 18th century, at the time of the plays written by Voltaire and performed within his circle of admirers, that the people of Geneva were finally able to attend performances. Geneva's first theatre, the Théâtre de Neuve, was built after the failed revolution of 1782 to entertain foreign troops and replace the now-banned social clubs.

The Genevan printing industry, already renowned at the end of 15th century, was strengthened after the Reformation by the arrival of French and Italian refugee booksellers and played a pivotal role in the dissemination, often clandestine, of Reformed ideas. It soon diversified its output to include classical Greek and Latin editions, as well as works on history, geography, medicine, and law. To withstand competition from Lyon, Genevan businesses combined publishing with the distribution of foreign works destined for major Western European markets. Following a golden age marked by the publication of the Encyclopédie, the Gazette d'Amsterdam, and the works of Montesquieu, Rousseau, Voltaire, and the Abbé Raynal, the Genevan publishing sector began to decline around 1780, giving way to the broader book trade. The few remaining printing houses then turned their focus to school textbooks and periodicals, the most famous being the Bibliothèque britannique at the end of the century, while also profiting from the surge in pamphleteering sparked by the political unrest of the late ancien régime.

== Government ==
Pierre Mussard (1690–1767), First Syndic of Geneva in 1762.

By adopting the Protestant Reformation in 1536, Geneva underwent a religious and political revolution, separating itself from the spiritual and temporal power of the Bishop to become an independent, sovereign republic. Along with other legal documents which governed it throughout the ancien régime, Calvin's ordinances on political offices and officeholders, issued in 1543 and revised in 1568, consacrated the existing political institutions of Geneva by regulating their powers and form of election. The Republic's government was structured as follows:

- The General Council (Conseil général), i.e. the electoral body, composed of all male citizens and burghers aged at least 25 years old. Its members had the right to vote and run for political office. On presentation of a list of candidates by the Small Council, the General Council elected the four Syndics in January, and in November the Lieutenant, his six assessors, the auditors, as well as the Prosecutor General.
- The Council of Two Hundred (Conseil des Deux-Cents) or Grand Council (Grand Conseil), established in 1527 following the Bernese model. It met about once a month to discuss matters submitted by the Small Council. While it had the authority to enact laws, it did so only upon the Small Council's recommendation.
- The Council of Sixty (Conseil des Soixante), originally the Council of Fifty (Conseil des Cinquante), created in 1457 as an advisory body during times of emergency. Its members were selected by the Small Council. It gradually ceased to convene during the 18th century.
- The Small Council (Petit Conseil), consisting of 25 members along with two secretaries of state. It served as the main executive authority of the Republic. Additionally, it was responsible for drafting laws and convened, in a limited capacity, as both a civil court of appeals and a criminal court. The members of the Small Council appointed those of the Council of Two Hundred and vice versa.
- The four Syndics, elected every year from among the citizens, existed since the late 13th century, and their magistracy was officially confirmed in 1309. As the supreme magistrates of the Republic, they presided over the Small Council and oversaw current affairs, with a "First Syndic" (premier syndic) taking precedence based on seniority in office.

== Population ==
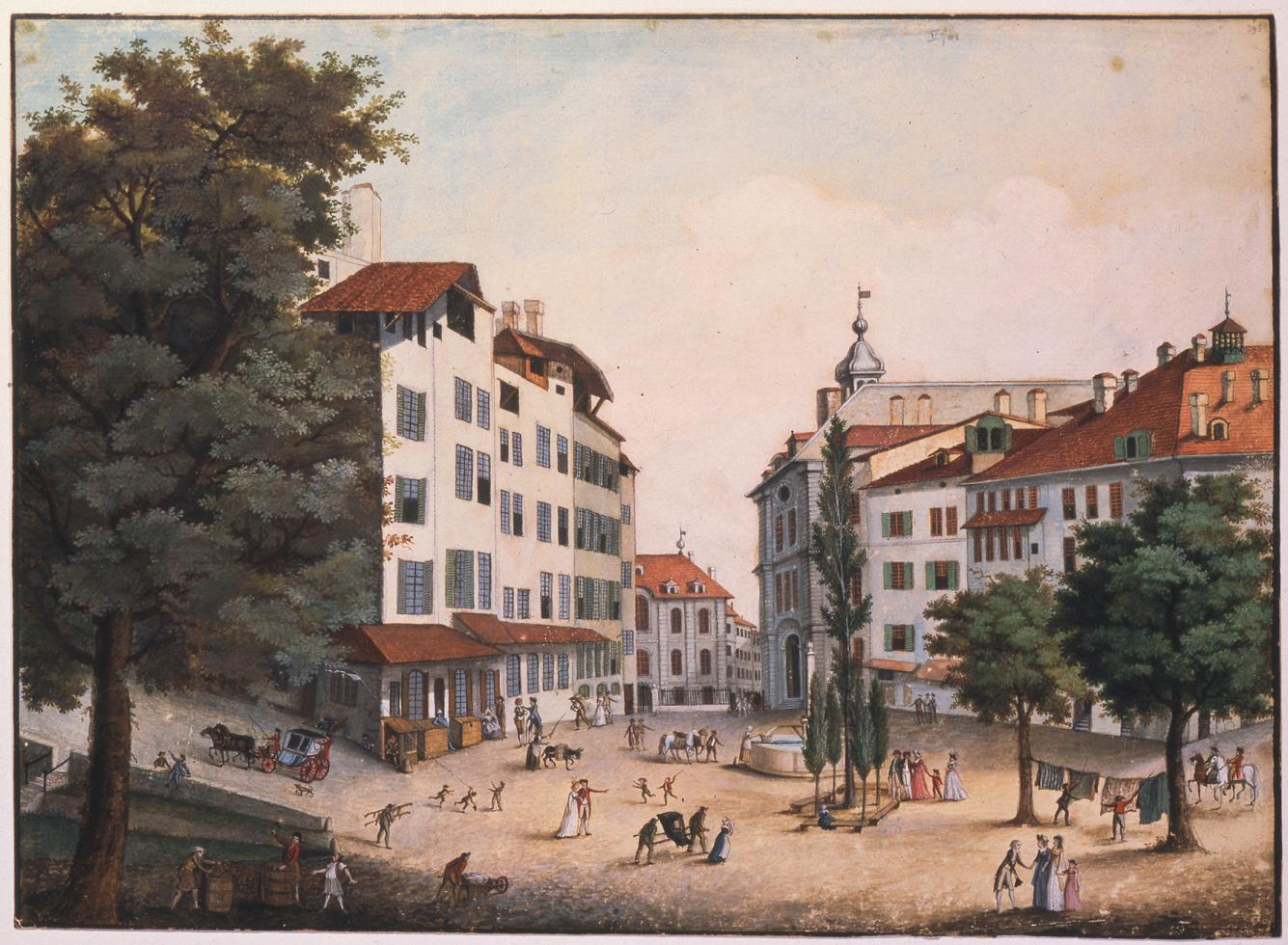
View of the Place du Bourg-de-Four and the Hôpital général, late 18th century.

Upon the arrival of the first French and Italian refugees, around 1550, the city of Geneva had a population of 13,100 people. Thanks to the new production networks established by these immigrants, the second half of the 16th century was marked by a significant population growth, reaching approximately 17,300 inhabitants by 1580. However, the city once again lost part of its population due to plagues, food shortages, and local and international military conflicts, with the number of inhabitants dropping to 14,400 by 1590.

After a prosperous period at the turn of the century, the 17th century was marked by a sharp decline in population, starting with the plague of 1615–1616; by around 1650, the number of city residents had returned to almost pre-Reformation levels (approximately 12,700 residents). On the other hand, benefiting from an emerging economic recovery and the arrival of numerous Huguenots during the second wave of refugees, both before and after the Revocation of the Edict of Nantes, Geneva saw its population grow steadily right up until the eve of the 1792 revolution, with 17,500 people in 1700 and 27,400 in 1790. Finally, the revolutionary period and the subsequent French annexation, which was characterized by economic recession due to international instability, saw the city's population decline once more, to 24,500 inhabitants in 1800, and then stagnate, before the spectacular population growth of the 19th century began.

Following the demolition of the suburbs for security reasons shortly before the Reformation, and throughout most of the Republic's existence, the majority of the Genevan population resided within the city's walls. The settlement of Protestant refugees during the 16th and 17th centuries took place under difficult conditions; many houses had to be raised in height to accommodate the surplus population, while open spaces, previously used for cultivation or small-livestock grazing, disappeared to make way for new residential buildings and structures dedicated to manufacturing, such as workshops, mills, and drying areas. The suburbs of Geneva slowly re-emerged in Plainpalais, Les Eaux-Vives, and Les Pâquis, and later extended toward Châtelaine and Le Petit-Saconnex, driven by the population growth of the late 16th and early 17th centuries.

During the 18th century, the Republic's countryside was densely populated by peasants and artisans, including a significant number of watchmakers, with a density of about 100 inhabitants per square kilometer. City-dwelling landowners, some of whom were keen on agronomy, would often spend time in the country to manage their crops and oversee the harvest. Although distributed across various villages and hamlets within the territory of the Republic, the rural population remains poorly documented prior to the end of the ancien régime; in 1797–1798, it numbered 4,432 people.

== See also ==
- Bourgeoisie of Geneva
- History of Geneva
- Plainpalais
