= Jean-Pierre Berenger =

Jean-Pierre Bérenger (1737– June, 1807) was a editor, historian, translator and pamphletist from the Republic of Geneva.

He was born in Geneva, Republic of Geneva to a family not native to the city, hence lacking citizenship. He studied in Geneva, and appears to have led a movement to gain political rights for similar residents, prompting his exile in 1770 by the Council of Ten. He moved to Lausanne, where he began to write. He was allowed to return to Geneva in 1781, where he successfully continued to agitate for participation. He corresponded by mail frequently with Benjamin Franklin.

Among his works, either written or edited, were:.

- Il quadro storico e politico delle Ginevra nel XVIII secolo by Francis d'Yvernois, (1782)
- Geografia di Busching, compendiata negli oggeti piu rilevanti, aumentat in quei che sembrarono esserlo, da per tutto ritoccata ed ornata di un compendio della storia di tutti gli stati (1776)
- Raccolta di tutti i viaggi fatti intorno al mondo (1789)
- Gli Amanti repubbicani
- Lettere di Niciea e Cinira (1782)
- Corso di Geografia storica, antica, e moderna del su Frédéric-Samuel Ostervald 1803
- Laura ed Augusto
- Storia de' tre viaggi intorno al mondo di Cook, ridotta a comune intelligenza
- Rousseau giustificato verso la sua patria
- Stato delle prigioni di Europa 1788, translation of the work in English by John Howard
