= Théâtre de Neuve =

- Interactive map of Théâtre de Neuve
- Location: Geneva
- Coordinates: 46°12′03″N 6°08′36″E

The Théâtre de Neuve was a theatre in Geneva, Republic of Geneva.

In 1783, the original theatre was replaced with a new stone building, the Théâtre de Neuve, designed by Pierre-David Matthey, with three tiers of boxes surrounding the orchestra seats and an audience capacity of 1000. Nevertheless, Its stage was cramped, with very little room in the wings, and the orchestra pit could not seat more than 30 musicians. At the eve of the French Revolution, as waves of political unrest rocked Geneva, the new theatre's function was still to entertain foreign officers sent as reinforcements and seats were primarily reserved for sponsors and shareholders. As such, most of the Geneva population could not attend performances.

The Théâtre de Neuve was destined to stand in place for less than a hundred years. Revolutionary troubles forced the theatre to close several times and it was used consecutively as a revolutionary club and a cotton mill. In October 1797, the theatre was definitely closed to any kind of performance, by decision of the authorities.

It remained closed until the French annexed Geneva in April 1798. During this fifteen-year occupation, the theatre hosted several companies of French performers. When Geneva's independence was restored in 1813, the French troops left Geneva, and the actors followed them. The theatre reopened in 1817 and expanded its audiences and repertoire, including works by contemporary composers such as Rossini, Donizetti, Auber and Meyerbeer, Beethoven, Weber and even Wagner, whose Tannhäuser was heard in Geneva long before it was ever performed in Paris. Despite occasional performances by stars of the time, the quality of performance was usually below average, a mix of comedy, vaudeville, operetta and, occasionally, a more ambitious opera. The general trend was partial to the French repertoire, preferably light: Faust was a regular hit, but nowhere near La fille de Madame Angot in popularity.
