= Pierre de La Baume =

His Eminence Pierre de La Baume
- Cardinal-Priest of Ss. Giovanni e Paolo
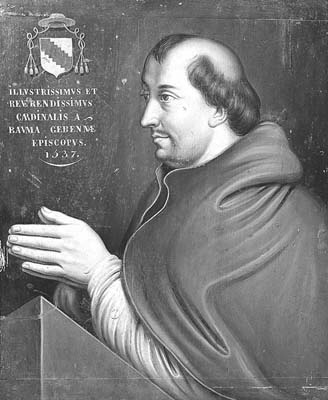
- Pierre de La Baume Portrait
- Appointed: 21 November 1541
- Installed: 21 November 1541
- Term ended: 4 May 1544
- Predecessor: Federico Fregóso
- Successor: Georges d’Armagnac
- Previous posts: Bishop of Geneva, Switzerland (1522 - 1543) Coadjutor Archbishop of Bisanz, Holy Roman Empire (1530 - 1541) Archbishop of Bisanz, Holy Roman Empire (1541 - 1543)

Orders
- Created cardinal: 19 December 1539

Personal details
- Born: Pierre de La Baume; 1477 Montrevel
- Died: 4 May 1544
- Denomination: Roman Catholic

Pierre de La Baume (1477 – 5 May 1544) was a grand seigneur of Savoy and a cardinal of the Roman Catholic Church. He was a councillor of Charles III, Duke of Savoy, whom he represented at the Fifth Lateran Council (1512–1517). He was born at the château de Montrevel, in Bresse, Savoy, the second son of Gui de La Baume, seigneur of la Roche-du-Vanel, Mont-Saint-Sorlin, and Attalens, in Switzerland, and later count of Montrevel, a chevalier of the Order of the Golden Fleece and chevalier d'honneur to Margaret of Habsburg, dowager Duchess of Savoy, and Jeanne de Longuy. Pierre matriculated at the University of Dole, where he received his doctorate in theology, 1502.

Worldly, highly connected and cultivated, a courtier abbot, he held several abbacies in commendam, of which he received the benefices but was not expected to be in residence: among them was the one he most favoured, the abbey of Saint-Oyend at Condat, which was in the gift of Margaret of Austria, whom his father served and who nominated him abbot in 1511. With the abbey came the château de la Tour-du-May, with its little village of Saint-Christophe. It became the favoured seat of Pierre de La Baume. There he entertained in great splendour Charles, Connétable de Bourbon, in 1524, who was fleeing the anger of François I, en route for Italy with a grand escort of gentlemen and cavalry. He was godfather to the bell that he hung in the abbey church in 1529 which commemorated his name, as Pierrotte la Joyeuse. There eventually he was buried.

He was also a canon of the cathedral of Saint Jean, Aix-en-Provence, and carried the purely courtesy title of comte de Lyon, as a canon of the cathedral of Lyons. He was mentioned in the Dictionnaire de la noblesse as titular Bishop of Tarsus, but the official lists of that diocese do not include him.

Having participated with distinction at the Lateran Council, La Baume was selected as Roman Catholic bishop of Geneva, 10 October 1522, following the death of the recent adversary of the Genevois, Jean de Savoie of the ducal house. He disappointed those who might have expected him to uphold the independent liberties of the city of Geneva against the violent pretensions of the Charles III, duke of Savoy by devolving local responsibilities on his vicar, Amé Lévrier, during his frequent absences. Lévrier was arrested 12 March 1524 and put to death by the duke. A remonstrance sent to the pope was timidly abandoned when Charles took possession of the city, but as he was unwilling to make it his permanent capital, as soon as he had absented himself once more in Piedmont, having forced the acquiescence of the Genevans to his sovereignty at the Conseil des hallebardes (15 December 1525), the Genevans erupted in revolution, disavowing all the acts passed under the menace of Savoyard halberdiers and linking themselves with Bern and Fribourg and the Swiss cantons. La Baume, returned from a two-year absence, was unable to raise any support for Savoyard claims of sovereignty; in 1527 the complaisant bishop devolved the administration of justice upon a tribunal of citizens, and withdrew to his favorite abbey of Condat. In a successful effort to bring his bishop to heel, Charles sequestered his benefices of Saint-Claude de Pignerol and of Suze, and La Baume made a complete submission in order to regain his revenues.

In Geneva, La Baume was strongly opposed by the dominant Protestant party, who twice expelled him, definitively in 1533. After which he withdrew to Annecy. He was created cardinal 19 December 1539 and bishop of Besançon, 29 December 1541 He was a courtier of Charles V, Holy Roman Emperor, who made him a Prince of the Empire.

Survivals of La Baume's taste as a patron are the predella panels of the grand retable he commissioned for the abbey of Saint-Oyend at Saint-Claude, today the cathedral of Saint-Pierre, Saint-Paul et Saint-André.

His nephew Claude de La Baume was made a cardinal in 1578. Two other nephews became abbots in commendam at the Abbey of Saint-Claude, establishing a precedent of abbots selected from the family that lasted until 1636.
