= Jean Pécolat =

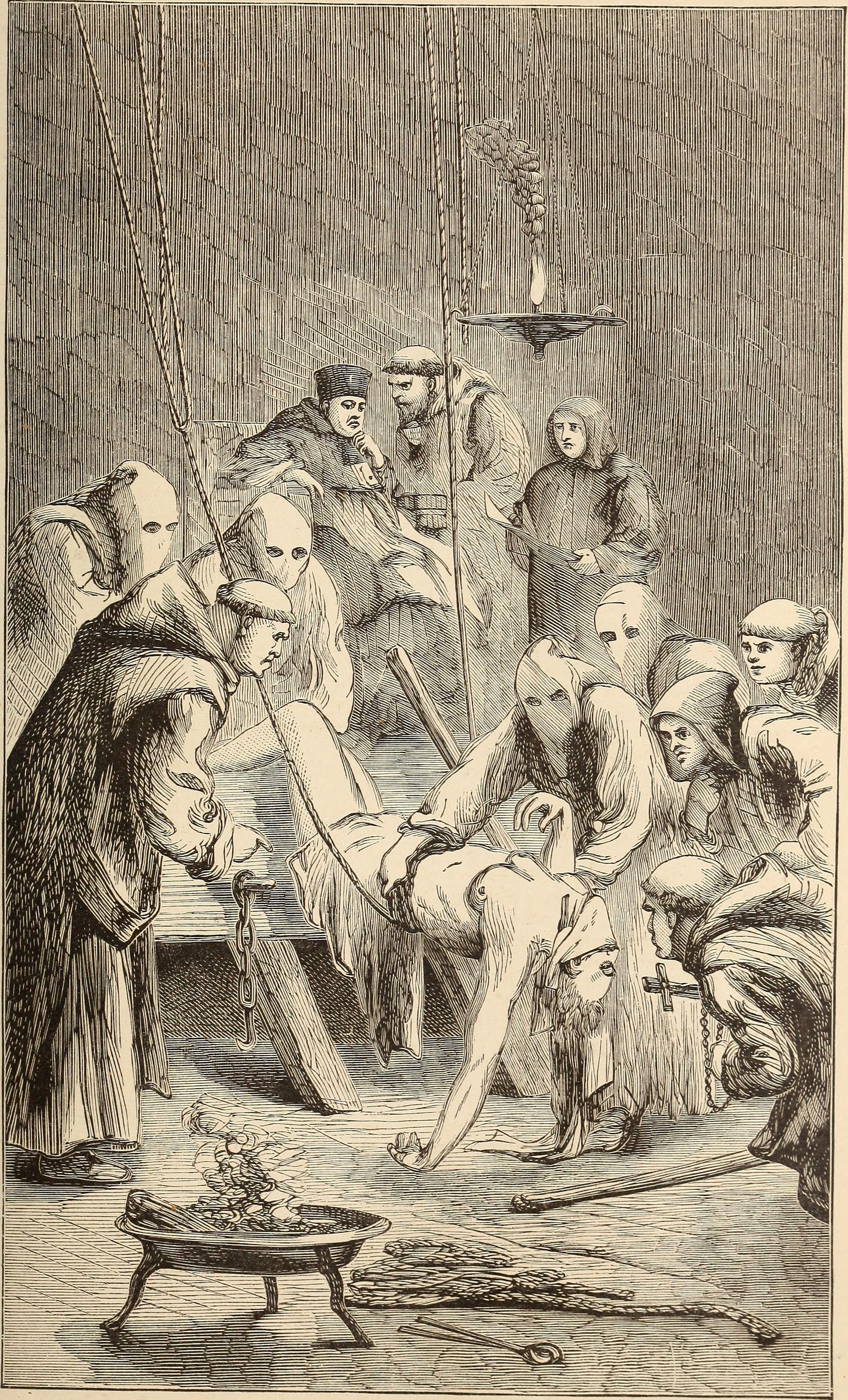
- Torture of Jean Pécolat
- Born: after 1487; Geneva
- Died: after 1540
- Occupation: Politician

Jean Pécolat (born after 1487 in Geneva, died after 1540) was a Genevan patriot and politician, member of several councils of the Republic of Geneva and ally of Philibert Berthelier. He was put to death by Jean de Savoie the Prince Bishop of Geneva.
