= Diocese of Geneva =

Former Catholic jurisdiction in Switzerland

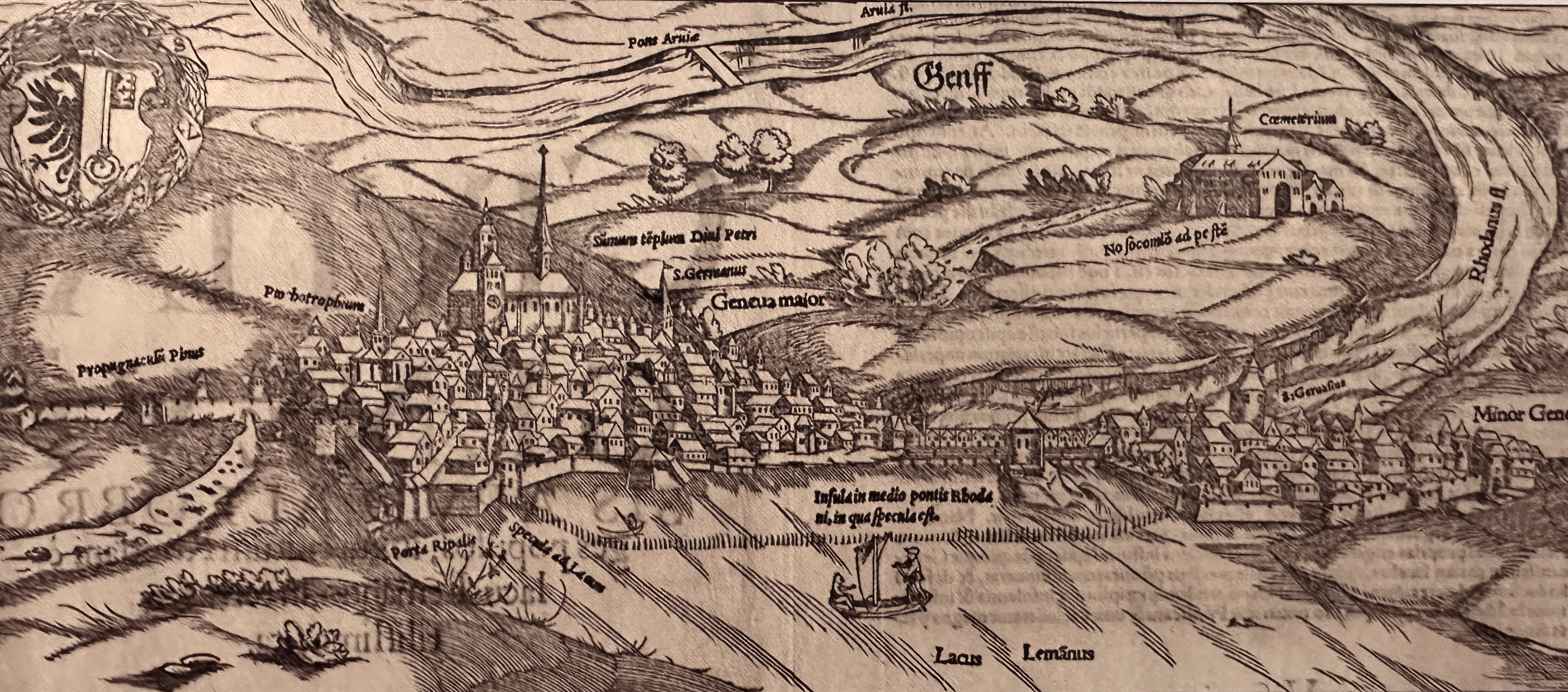
Sébastien Münster: View of Geneva, 1550. Cathedral of S. Pierre, left of center

The Diocese of Geneva was a Latin Church ecclesiastical jurisdiction or diocese in part of Switzerland and Savoy from 400 to 1801, when it merged with the Diocese of Chambéry. The merged diocese was later broken up, due to changes in national boundaries. The diocese of Chambéry lost Swiss territory to the Diocese of Lausanne, Geneva and Fribourg.

== History ==
Geneva was first recorded as a border town of the Allobroges, fortified against the Helvetii (Celto-Germanic people). In 120 BC, Geneva was conquered by the Romans. In 443 AD, Geneva became part of the Kingdom of Burgundy. In 534 AD, it fell to the Franks. In 888 AD, Geneva was returned to the Kingdom of Burgundy. In 1033, it was taken into the Kingdom of Germany.

The position of the first Bishop of Geneva is ascribed to multiple individuals. A legend holds that Nazarius (Saint Lazarus), the follower of Simon Peter and Pope Linus, was the first Bishop of Geneva. Gregorio Leti (1630 – 1701) and Besson, wrote of the legend that Geneva was christianised by Dionysius the Areopagite and Paracodus, two of the seventy-two disciples of Jesus Christ, in the time of Domitian (81 – 91 AD), and that Paracodus became the first Bishop of Geneva. However, this is explained as based on an error, arising from the similarity of the Latin names Genava (Geneva in Switzerland) and Genua (Genoa in Italy).

It is also claimed that Diogenes was the first bishop, sent out as a missionary by Pope Sixtus I (c. 116–125).

The Catalogue de St. Pierre, a list of the bishops of Geneva found on a page, now missing, in a bible belonging to the cathedral of Saint Pierre in Geneva, once the property of Bishop Frederick, which records that Diogenes was the first Bishop of Geneva, is untrustworthy.

Eucherius of Lyon, in his prologue to the "Passion of the Saints of Agaune," indicates that Isaac of Monteluco (c. 400 AD) was Bishop of Geneva.

=== Authentic early bishops ===
A letter of Salvian in 440 AD indicates that Salonius was Bishop of Geneva. Salonius was the son of Eucherius of Lyon. Eucherius dedicated his "Instructions" to Salonius. Salonius took part in the Council of Orange (441 AD) and in the Councils of Vaison (442 AD) and Arles (c. 455 AD). Salonius (called Bishop Salonius of Vienne) may have authored two small commentaries, In Parabolas Salomonis and On Ecclesiastics.

Little is known about the bishops who followed Salonius. Theoplastus (c. 475 AD) was the recipient of a letter from St. Sidonius Apollinaris. When Dormitianus (before 500 AD) was bishop, Princess Sedeleuba van Bourgondië, a sister of Queen Clotilde, had the remains of the martyr, Victor of Solothurn moved to Geneva. Sedeleuba built a basilica in the martyr's honour. Maximus of Geneva (c. 512 – 541 AD), corresponded with Avitus, Archbishop of Vienne and Cyprian of Toulon. In 541 AD, Bishop Pappulus sent Thoribiusas, a priest, to represent him at the Fourth Council of Orléans. Bishop Salonius II is only known from his signatures at the Synod of Lyons (570 AD) and the Synod of Paris (573 AD). In 584 AD, Cariatto was made Bishop of Geneva by King Guntram. In 585 AD, Bishop Cariatto attended Council of Valence in 584, and the Council of Macon in 585.

The Bishopric (office of bishop) of Geneva was a suffragan (subordinate) of the Archbishopric of Vienne. Bishop Hilary of Arles, in the second quarter of the 5th century, attempted to claim it as a suffragan of Arles, but Pope Leo I ruled against him.

=== The Holy Roman Empire ===
In September 1032, with the death of King Rudolf III, the dynasty of the kings of Burgundy, which had ruled since 888, came to an end. Sovereignty passed to the Emperor Conrad II (1027–1039), who was crowned king of Burgundy on 2 February 1033. In 1034, he entered Burgundy with his army, and received the submission of its cities, including Geneva, where he was again elected king.

On 17 January 1154, the Emperor Frederick Barbarossa received Bishop Ardicius at his court at Speyer, and appointed and invested him as the Prince Bishop of Geneva. However, their independence was limited by the ecclesiastical overseers appointed by the archbishop (advocati), the Counts of Geneva and later, the Counts of Savoy.

=== House of Savoy ===
Bishop Guillaume de Conflans and Count Amadeus V of Savoy were in continual conflict on many matters during the entire period of the bishop's administration, 1287 to 1295. On 30 December 1287, the bishop laid an interdict on all the lands of the count in his diocese. On 19 September 1290, they signed a treaty, by which the Counts of Savoy obtained the tight to appoint the bishop's lieutenant, or Vidame, as a fief, and the diocese had returned rights and properties along the Rhone which had been appropriated by the Count. François de Candie of Chambéry-Le-Vieux was one such Vidame.

In 1387, Bishop Adhémar Fabry granted Geneva its charter ensuring the city's rights and institutional continuity. Subsequent bishops were expected to affirm the charter.

In 1394, the Counts of Geneva's line ended with no further issue. The House of Savoy sought to take its place. On 19 February 1416, King Sigismund of Germany granted the counts of Savoy the title "Duke". The counts repeatedly maneuvered to elevate their family members to the Bishop of Geneva's diocesan staff. Their most notable success came when the former Duke Amadeus VIII, who had been elected Pope Felix V by the Council of Basel, became Administrator of the diocese of Geneva in March 1444, and held the office until his death in 1451.

The City of Geneva responded to the successes of the House of Savoy by making an alliance with the Old Swiss Confederacy, an Eidgenossenschaft. In 1526, Geneva aligned with Bern and Fribourg.

=== The Protestant Reformation ===
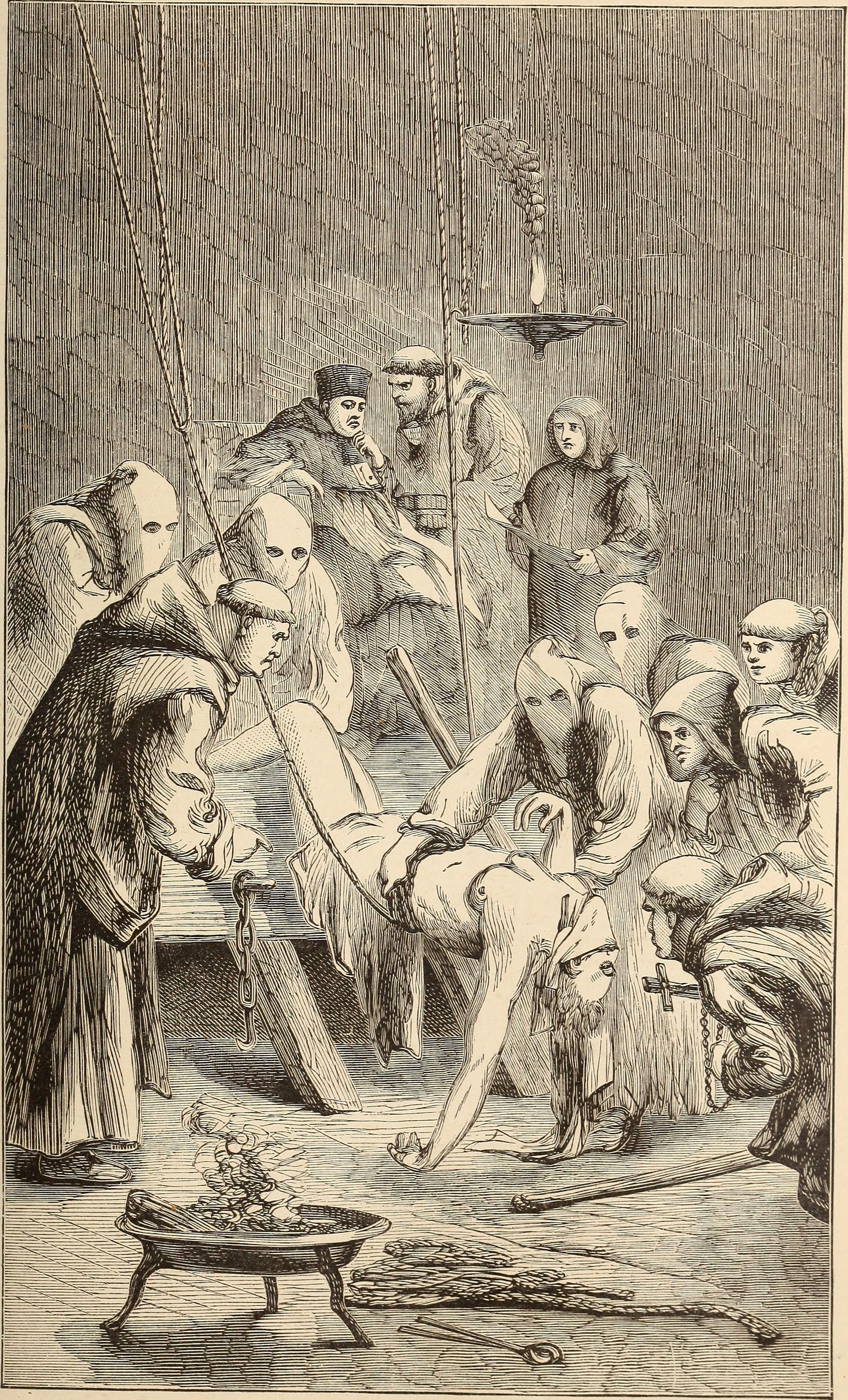
Jean Pécolat (in French) being tortured in 1517 under the order of Jean de Savoie, Bishop of Geneva

In the 16th century, the Genevan Reformation was part of a great change in the religious and political life of Geneva. Prior to the reformation, the Diocese of Geneva extended well into Savoy, as far as Mont Cenis and the Great St Bernard Pass. It also included Nyon. However, under the rule of Charlemagne (742 – 814) Tarantaise was detached from Geneva to form a separate diocese. The bishops of Geneva ruled over 8 chapters, 423 parishes, 9 abbeys and 68 priories.

On 2 August 1527, Bishop Pierre de la Baume, harassed both by the people of Geneva and by the Duke of Savoy, fled the city for some property in Burgundy. On 2 July 1533, he returned to Geneva, but on 14 July he fled again. He and the cathedral Chapter of Geneva settled in Annecy in 1535, and, despite their own efforts and encouragement from Pope Clement VII, they were not able to persuade the Genevans to allow a return. Bishop de la Baune was named a cardinal by Pope Paul III on 19 December 1539, and promoted to the archbishopric of Besançon on 29 December 1541. The Emperor Charles V issued a golden bull suspending all authority in Geneva except that of the emperor and the bishop. The Church imposed the interdict.

During the Reformation, the City of Bern supported the Protestant Reformers, including William Farel (1489 – 1565) and Antoine Froment (1508 – 1581). The City of Fribourg supported the Catholic Church and in 1531, renounced its alliance with Geneva. In 1536, John Calvin (1509 – 1564) went to Geneva, but was expelled after disagreement over details of the Easter eucharist. He returned to Geneva in 1541 and lived there until his death. Geneva became a stronghold of Calvinism. In 1532, the Bishop of Geneva was removed from his seat. In 1535, he established his see in Annecy and in 1536 at Gex.

Francis de Sales (1567 – 1622) was Bishop of Geneva. He held the position from 1602 to 1621. Through his devotion, many in the diocese returned to Catholicism.

=== Geneva under French occupation ===
In 1792, Savoy was invaded and occupied by forces of the French National Assembly. Commissioners sent from Paris imposed a revolutionary government, and on 8 March 1793 issued an ecclesiastical decree which followed metropolitan French policy by reducing the number of dioceses from 5 to 1, to be centered in Annecy and called the diocese of Mont-Blanc. Four of the five bishops then in office went into exile; the fifth was too aged. Electors, who did not have to be Catholic or even Christian, were to meet and elect a bishop, who would be required to take the usual oaths to the French Constitution. Papal participation in any form was forbidden. These arrangements were uncanonical and schismatic.

Under the rule of the First Consul Napoleon, the Canton of Geneva was annexed to France. Writing from exile in Turin on 21 November 1801, the bishop of Geneva, Joseph-Marie Paget, at the request of Pope Pius VII, submitted his resignation as bishop. The pope, then, in fulfilment of earlier agreements with the French government, suppressed the Diocese of Geneva, and annexed its territory to the new Diocese of Chambéry. On 9 June 1815, in Article LXXX of the general treaty at the Congress of Vienna, the Canton of Geneva was extended to cover 15 Savoyard and 6 French parishes, ceded by the King of Sardinia. This included 16,000 people of the Catholic faith. Geneva was also admitted to the Swiss Confederation. The Congress of Vienna and the Treaty of Turin (1816) provided protection to the Catholic religion in Geneva.

=== Restoration ===
In 1819, Pope Pius VII united the City of Geneva and twenty parishes with the Diocese of Lausanne. In 1822, due to changes in international borders which had placed the territory of the diocese of Geneva in several nations, the area belonging to the Diocese of Geneva but beyond the borders of Switzerland became the Diocese of Annecy. The Cantonal Council abandoned previous agreements. In imitation of the French Organic Articles (laws regarding public worship) the Cantonal Council requested a placet (an acceptance by civil authorities of canon law).

Etienne Marilley (1804–1889) became the parish priest of Geneva in 1831 and was consecrated bishop of Lausanne and Geneva in 1846. The 1870s was the time of Kulturkampf. For instance, discord arose concerning public financial support for the Protestant and Old Catholic Churches, while the Catholic Church received none. On 30 June 1907, Geneva voted for the separation of church and state.

== Bishops of Geneva (Genf, Genève) ==
=== To 1200 ===
...

- Isaac (end of 4th cent.)

...

- Theoplastus (last third of 5th cent.)
- Domitianus (2nd half of 5th cent.)

...

- Maximus (attested 517)
- Pappulus (attested 549)
- Salonius (attested 570–573)
- Cariatto (attested 584–585)

...

- Abellenus (attested c. 620)

...

- Pappulus (attested 650)

...

- Altadus (attested 833–838)

...

- Ansegisus (attested 877)
- Optandus (attested 881)
- Bernardus (attested c. 892)

...

- Geroldus
- Hugo (993–1020)
- Bernardus (c.1020–1030)
- Adalgodus (c.1020–1030)
- Konradus (c.1020–1030)
- Fridericus (c.1030–1073)
- ? Boczadus (c. 1073–1083 ?)
- Guy de Faucigny (c. 1083–1119)
- Humbert de Grammont (1120–1135)
- Arducius de Faucigny (1135–1185)
- Nantelmus (1185–1205)

=== 1200 to 1500 ===
- Bernard Chabert (1205–1213)
- Pierre de Sessons (1213–1213)
- Aymon de Grandson (1215–1260)
- Henri de Bottis, O.S.B.Clun. (1260–1267)
- Aymon de Menthonay (1268–1275)
- Robert de Genève (1276–1287)
- Guillaume de Conflans (1287–1295))
- Martin de Saint-Germain (1295–1303)
- Aimone de Quart (1304–1311)
- Pierre de Faucigny (1311–1342)
- Alamand de Saint-Jeoire (1342–1366))
- Guillaume de Marcossey (1366–1377)
- Jean de Murol (1378–1385)
- Adhémar Fabri de La Roche, O.P. (1385–1388) (Avignon Obedience)
- Guillaume di Lornay (1388–1408) (Avignon Obedience)
- Jean de Bertrand (1408–1418) (Avignon Obedience)
- Jean de la Rochetaillée (1418–1422) Administrator
- Jean Courtecuisse (1422–1423)
- Jean Allarmet de Brogny (1423–1426) Administrator
- François de Meez, O.S.B. (1426–1444)
- Amedeus of Savoie (1444–1451) Administrator
- Pierre de Savoie (1451 – 1458) Administrator
- Jean-Louis de Savoie (1460 – 1482)
  - Auxiliary Bishop: Mamerto Fichet (1469–1473), Titular Bishop of Hebron (1470–?)
- Cardinal Domenico della Rovere (19–24 July 1482)
- Jean de Compey (1482 – 1484)
- François de Savoie (1484–1490)
- Antoine Champion (1490–1495)

Philippe de Savoie (1495–1509) Bishop-elect

=== 1500 to 1800 ===
- Charles de Seyssel (1509–1513)
- Jean de Savoie (1513–1522)
- Pierre de La Baume (1522–1543)
- Louis de Rye (1543–1550)
- Philibert de Rye (1550–1556)
- François de Bachod (1556–1568)
- Ange Justiniani (1568–1578)
- Claude de Granier (1578–1602)
- François de Sales (1602–1622)
- Jean-François de Sales (1622–1635)
- Juste Guérin (1639–1645)
- Charles-Auguste de Sales (1645–1660)
- Jean d’Arenthon d’Alex (1661–1695)
- Michel-Gabriel de Rossillon de Bernex (1697–1734)
- Joseph-Nicolas Deschamps di Chaumont (1741–1763)
- Jean-Pierre Biord (1764−1785)

Sede vacante (1785–1787)

- Joseph-Marie Paget (1787–1801)
  - [François-Thérèse Panisseta (1792–1793)
    Constitutional bishop]

Bishops of Chambéry

- René des Monstiers de Mérinville (1802–1805)
- Irénée-Yves de Solle (1805–1821)

== See also ==
- Bishop of Lausanne
- Roman Catholic Diocese of Lausanne, Geneva and Fribourg
- List of Catholic dioceses in Switzerland
- Abbey of Sainte-Catherine-du-Mont in Annecy

== Sources ==
=== Episcopal lists ===
- Eubel, Conradus, ed. (1913). Hierarchia catholica (in Latin). Vol. 1 (Tomus I) (second ed.). Münster: Libreria Regensbergiana. (in Latin)
- Eubel, Conradus, ed. (1914). Hierarchia catholica (in Latin). Vol. 2 (Tomus II) (second ed.). Münster: Libreria Regensbergiana. archived
- Eubel, Conradus; Gulik, Guilelmus, eds. (1923). Hierarchia catholica (in Latin). Vol. 3 (Tomus III) (second ed.). Münster: Libreria Regensbergiana.
- Gauchat, Patritius (Patrice) (1935). Hierarchia catholica. Vol. 4 (Tomus IV) (1592–1667). Münster: Libraria Regensbergiana.
- Ritzler, Remigius; Sefrin, Pirminus (1952). Hierarchia catholica medii et recentis aevi. Vol. 5 (Tomus V) (1667–1730). Patavii: Messagero di S. Antonio.
- Ritzler, Remigius; Sefrin, Pirminus (1958). Hierarchia catholica medii et recentis aevi. Vol. 6 (Tomus VI) (1730–1799). Patavii: Messagero di S. Antonio.

=== Studies ===
- Baud, Henri (ed.). Le diocèse de Genève-Annecy. [Histoire des diocèses de France, vol 19]. (in French). Paris: Beauchesne, 1985.
- Binz, Louis (1973). Vie Religieuse et Reforme Ecclesiastique Dans le Diocese de Geneve, pendant le Grand Schisme et la crise conciliaire (1378–1450). (in French). Volume 1 Genèvre: Jullien 1973.
- Besson, Joseph-Antoine (1871). Memoires pour l'histoire ecclesiastique des dioceses de Geneve, Tarantaise, Aoste et Maurienne (etc.). (in French). Moutiers: Marc Cane, 1871.
- Duchesne, Louis (1907). Fastes épiscopaux de l'ancienne Gaule. (in French). vol. I, second edition, Paris 1907, pp. 225–230.
- Fleury, François (1880). Histoire de l'Église de Genève depuis les temps les plus anciens jusqu'en 1802: Avec pièces justificatives. (in French). Volume 1. Genève: Grosset et Trembley, 1880. Vol. 2. Vol. 3.
- Hauréau, Jean-Barthélemy (1865). Gallia christiana, (in Latin). vol. XVI, Paris: Firmin Didot 1865, coll. 373-508.
- Lavanchy, Jh. M. (1894). Le diocèse de Genève (partie de Savoie) pendant la Révolution française. (in French). Volume 1. Annecy: C. Burnod 1894. Volume II.
- Lullin, Paul; Le Fort, Charles (edd.) (1866). Régeste genevois: ou, Répertoire chronologique et analytique des documents imprimés relatifs à l'histoire de la ville et du diocèse de Genève avant l'année 1312. (in French and Latin). Genève: Société d'histoire et d'archéologie de Genève 1866.
- Mallet, Édouard (1843). "Mémoire historique sur l'élection des évêques de Genève. Premier partie," (in French), in: Mémoires et documents de la Société d'histoire et d'archéologie, Volume 2 (Genève: J. Jullien, 1843), pp. 104–234.
- Mallet, Édouard (1847). "Mémoire historique sur l'élection des évêques de Genève. Second partie," (in French), in: Mémoires et documents de la Société d'histoire et d'archéologie, Volume 5 (Genève: La Société/F. Ramboz, 1847), pp. 127–354.
- Mallet, Édouard (1862). Chartes inédits relatives à l'histoire de la ville et du diocèse du Genève et antérieures à l'année 1312. (in French and Latin). Genève: Jullien/Société d'histoire et d'archéologie de Genève, 1862.
- Pius VII, "Inter multiplices" (20 September 1819); and "Temporum vices" (30 January 1821), in: Bullarii romani continuatio. (in Latin). Vol. XV, pp. 246–248; pp. 370–371.
- lemma 'Diocesi di Ginevra', in Dizionario storico della Svizzera. (in Italian). 12 vols. Locarno: A. Dadò, 2002–2014.

=== External links ===
- Chow, Gabriel. GCatholic.
