= Geneva Revolution of 1782 =

Short-lived revolution in the Republic of Geneva

The Geneva Revolution of 1782 (French: La révolution genevoise de 1782) was a short-lived revolutionary attempt to broaden voting rights and include men of modest means in the republican government of the oligarchic Republic of Geneva.

== Background ==
In 1782, the constitution of the Republic of Geneva, a small Swiss city-state, limited the franchise to 1,500 well-to-do male burghers, (upper middle class citizens, mostly merchants) About 5,000 lower middle-class "natives"—male Genevans born to long-standing Geneva families—lived in the city but were excluded from voting or serving in office. These men worked as artisans and craftsmen in various trades, principally watchmakers. Also excluded from the franchise were a larger number of "habitants": residents whose roots lay in the republic but outside the city, or whose families had immigrated to Geneva from elsewhere.

For two decades, the city's politics had opposed the Négatifs, who supported the traditional aristocratic and oligarchical governance by a closed corporation, to the Représantants of more democratic views.

== Course of events ==
Agitation for a broader franchise had been ongoing for years; on 5 February 1781, unenfranchised men, both "habitants" and "natives", broke into the municipal armory and armed themselves. In response, the General Council of Geneva, the largest of the city's legislative bodies, voted to grant voting rights to 100 "natives" and 20 "habitants". The select legislative body, the Genevan Small Council, baulked at ratifying this token offer of enfranchisement, stalling for over a year before, in April 1782, voting to block it.

Within hours of the vote, revolutionaries occupied the City Hall, closed the city gates, held the "no voters" (i.e. Négatifs) hostage, and convinced the Representatives of the General Council to support them. A commission de sûreté was set up, headed by Étienne Clavière and Jacques-Antoine Duroveray.

The city's wealthy burghers countered by involving powers of the ancien régime. Charles Gravier, comte de Vergennes decided to extinguish the Geneva Revolution, despite France's concurrent support for the Patriots of the American Revolutionary War, and also for the Patriottentijd in the Netherlands.

The Kingdom of France, the canton of Bern, and the Kingdom of Sardinia sent professional troops. The city was returned to government by the burgher élite.

== Aftermath ==
The revolutionary committee's leaders left across Lake Geneva, and in June 1782, formal banishment was enacted against 21 prominent supporters. A larger selection, some 500, departed from the city. A group of leading exiles settled first at Neuchâtel. They were expelled later in the year, as disruptive, through the influence of Frederick the Great. Some went to Ireland and set up a colony in 1784, at Waterford. However, this colony did not bear fruit; the Genevans insisted that they govern themselves under their own laws but should be represented in the Irish parliament. The New Geneva barracks date from this period. Many moved on to Paris.
