= Jean de Savoie =

Jean-François de Savoie was a bishop of Geneva from 1513 to his death in 1522.

Jean was the illegitimate son of François de Savoie, the diocesan administrator of Geneva between 1484 and 1490. He had been a priest of the diocese of Angers, to which François de Savoie had been transferred in 1490, for which he had required a dispensation super defectus natalium. When Pope Leo X voided the election made by the Cathedral chapter, he granted the right to appoint the next bishop to Charles III, Duke of Savoy, who named his cousin Jean, who was approved by the Pope. Jean died on 8 June 1522.

This appointment created tension between the city authorities in Geneva and the House of Savoy that led to a revolt in 1515 would lead to the formation of the Republic of Geneva. For much of the time he was an absentee, spending his time in Pignerol near Turin.
