= Calvin's Geneva =

Geneva under John Calvin, 1536–1564

- 1536–1564
| Catholic Geneva | Post Calvin Geneva |
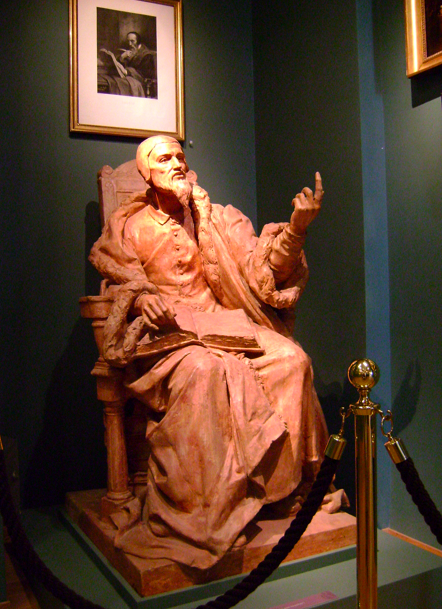
- Statue of John Calvin at the International Museum of the Reformation, Geneva
- Location: Republic of Geneva
- Leader(s): John Calvin, William Farel, Theodore Beza
- Key events: Ecclesiastical Ordinances (1541); Genevan Consistory; Execution of Michael Servetus (1553); founding of the Academy of Geneva (1559); ban on Christmas (1550)

Calvin's Geneva refers to the period of political, religious, and social transformation in the Republic of Geneva under the leadership of the Protestant reformer John Calvin between 1536 and 1564. Following Calvin’s arrival in Geneva in his late twenties, the city became one of the principal centers of the Protestant Reformation, earning the nickname “the Protestant Rome.”

Calvin, in collaboration with figures such as William Farel and later Theodore Beza, introduced the Genevan Consistory, modelled on the Ecclesiastical Ordinances (1541), which regulated church discipline and civic life. His reforms extended beyond religion to education, publishing, and industry, while Geneva attracted thousands of Protestant refugees from across Europe.

The period was also marked by tension and opposition. Calvin and Farel were expelled from the city in 1538 but Calvin returned in 1541 to consolidate a new order. Conflicts with the so-called Libertines and the controversial execution of Michael Servetus in 1553 underscored the contested nature of his authority. Despite this resistance, Calvin’s influence helped shape Reformed theology and made Geneva a model for Protestant communities throughout Europe.

== Background ==
In the early sixteenth century, Geneva was a small but strategically important city on the frontier between France, Switzerland and Savoy; locally contested by the Dukes of Savoy, the Bishop of Geneva and the local representative institutions. In 1526 Geneva entered into a political alliance combourgeoisie with the Swiss city-states of Bern and Fribourg, which gave it protection against Savoyard control and opened the way for religious reform. Under the influence the now Protestant Bern and the fiery preacher William Farel, a French reformer under the Bern's protection, the city officially embraced the Protestant Reformation in May 1536, abolishing the Mass and Catholic rites.

It was into this turbulent political and religious environment that John Calvin - already gaining recognition as a reformer through his Institutes of the Christian Religion - arrived later the same year at the age of twenty-seven. He had only intended for this to be a stopover on his way to Strasbourg, due to military manoeuvres of imperial and French forces. William Farel implored Calvin to stay and assist him in his work of reforming the church there. Calvin accepted his new role without any preconditions on his tasks or duties.

== First reforms and exile ==
Calvin settled in Geneva and was appointed professor of theology. He played both a religious and a political role. In November 1536 Calvin and Farel wrote the “Articles for the Unity of the Church and to Unite the Citizens in the Faith of Christ” which were ratified by the Council in early 1537. In March 1537 Geneva expelled Anabaptists. In this Calvin recommended that the council should appoint “in every quarter of the city certain persons...who would have an eye on the life of every one” and report “any notable vice to a minister for private admonition.”

As 1537 progressed, Calvin and Farel's reputation with the council began to suffer. Disputes arose particularly over the frequency of communion and the severity of applying excommunication. Before Calvin city magistrates could declare Genevans free from excommunication. Calvin held that those who mocked the Church and God’s law must be punished with the Church having the right to sentence them. The magistrates, however, believed this was their responsibility, since communion was the right and duty of everyone. Excommunication at the time was akin to ostracism and therefore conferred immense power.

Gradually, Calvin’s opponents regrouped and gained strength. On 4 January 1538, the General Council decreed that no one should be barred from communion. On 3 February 1538, four new syndics were elected, all hostile to Calvin. The main criticisms were his constant mixing of spiritual and temporal power and the fact that a foreigner had presumed to banish Genevans. This hostility, however, was not directed against the Reformation itself. In March 1538, the Council forbade Calvin from involving himself in civil affairs. Tensions escalated, and he was imprisoned a month later. In this conflict, Calvin acted in full accord with William Farel.

France was taking an interest in forming an alliance with Geneva and as the two ministers were Frenchmen, councillors had begun to question their loyalty.

Finally, a major ecclesiastical-political quarrel developed when the city of Bern, Geneva's ally in the reformation of the Swiss churches, proposed to introduce uniformity in the church ceremonies. One proposal required the use of unleavened bread for the Eucharist. The two ministers were unwilling to follow Bern's lead and delayed the use of such bread until a synod in Zurich could be convened to make the final decision. In April the council ordered Calvin and Farel to use unleavened bread for the Easter Eucharist. In protest, they refused to administer communion during the Easter service. This caused a riot during the service. The next day, the council told Farel and Calvin to leave Geneva with Calvin going to Strasbourg where he became a minister under Martin Bucer which affected his views of how the Reformation could be put into practice.

== Return from exile ==
Due to chaos during his exile he was called back by the Genevan authorities and returned in 1541 to introduce the Ecclesiastical Ordinances and later the Civil Edicts, which together structured both church and state until the late 18th century. These ordinances were approved by the General Council on 30 November 1541.

Under Calvin, Geneva became a major center of the Reformation, attracting thousands of Protestant refugees and developing important industries such as printing, textiles, and later watchmaking.

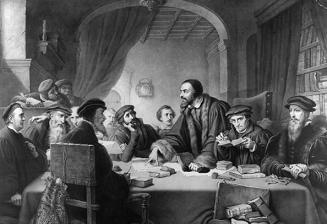
The Genevan Consistory

Calvin also created the Genevan Consistory, an assembly comprising five pastors and twelve elders from the Small Council, laymen entrusted with a religious ministry. This body oversaw the city’s spiritual orthodoxy and punished minor offenses (admonitions, fines) as well as major crimes (imprisonment, exile, and capital punishment). From this point on, he became highly influential in the city, and his opponents nicknamed him “the Pope of Geneva”. Despite this he was more careful than previous reformers such as Luther and Zwingli to separate church structures from city authorities. He secured council approval for his articles of faith and ordinances on church discipline, reforming morals as well as beliefs.

During the first five years of his “rule,” thirteen people were hanged, ten beheaded, and thirty-five burned at the stake.

At Calvin’s instigation, the celebration of Christmas was banned in Republic of Geneva from 1550 a ban that lasted until the early 18th Century, since for the reformer no day was holier than another and celebrating an unbiblical feast was papist superstition.

In 1559, Calvin founded the Academy of Geneva, the forerunner of the University of Geneva, entrusting the rectorship to his later successor Theodore Beza. Calvin’s influence extended to the development of Reformed theology.

== Protestant refugees ==
Calvin also supported the admission into Geneva of Protestant refugees, which some Genevans strongly opposed. Between 1549 and 1587, Geneva granted residence to nearly 8,000 refugees, of whom about 3,000 settled permanently, making up roughly 30% of the city’s population. Among them were several prominent Lucca families, including the Burlamaqui, Diodati, Micheli, and Calandrini, who became influential in Geneva’s civic and religious life.

Dozens of Huguenot printers also established themselves in the city, helping turn Geneva into a major center for the publication of Bibles and psalters. This influx of exiles from across Europe contributed to Geneva’s reputation as the “Protestant Rome,” producing works such as the Genevan Psalter and reinforcing its role as a hub of Reformed theology.

== Opponents ==
This Protestant theocratic government acted against those opposed to the Reformation, sometimes even sentencing them to exile or capital punishment. Thus Michael Servetus was condemned to death and burned in public for denying the doctrine of the Trinity on 27 October 1553. Although Calvin wished the city council’s sentence had been carried out by a method other than burning, he had been in favor of the death sentence.

In 1547, Jacques Gruet, a critic of Calvin’s leadership, was arrested after a threatening note was found at St. Pierre Cathedral; a search of his home uncovered writings mocking Scripture and opposing Geneva’s religious authorities. He was tortured, confessed to libeling Calvin, and was executed by beheading on 26 July 1547, while his later-discovered anti-Christian writings were publicly burned in 1550.

The word libertine was originally coined by Calvin to negatively describe Genevan opponents of his policies. The group, led by Ami Perrin, argued against Calvin's "insistence that church discipline should be enforced uniformly against all members of Genevan society". Perrin and his allies were elected to the town council in 1548, and "broadened their support base in Geneva by stirring up resentment among the older inhabitants against the increasing number of religious refugees who were fleeing France in even greater numbers". By 1555, Calvinists were firmly in place on the Genevan town council, so the Libertines, led by Perrin, responded with an "attempted coup against the government and called for the massacre of the French. This was the last great political challenge Calvin had to face in Geneva".

== Legacy ==
After Calvin’s death in 1564, leadership of the Genevan church passed to his close associate Theodore Beza, who preserved Calvin’s institutional framework although was less protective of the church's autonomy than Calvin. The Academy of Geneva expanded into a major center of Reformed learning with new faculties in law and theology.

French Huguenots and other Protestant refugees continued to see Geneva as a haven, especially after the St. Bartholomew’s Day Massacre of 1572. Geneva's printing presses spread Reformed theology across the continent, while Beza’s work Right of Magistrates (1574) articulated a theory of resistance to tyranny that influenced Protestant political thought throughout Europe.

By the late sixteenth century, Geneva’s influence extended far beyond its small size, shaping churches in France, the Netherlands, England, and the Scotland.

== Bibliography ==
- Bonnet, Jules (1847). Letters of John Calvin, Volume 2. Thomas Constable & Co.
- Carus, Paul (1896). "The Open Court, Volume 10". Open Court Publishing Company. pp. 5555–5557, 5568–6670.
- Choisy, Eugène (1914). "Beza, Theodore". In Philip Schaff (ed.). The New Schaff-Herzog Encyclopedia of Religious Knowledge. Vol. 2. New York: Funk and Wagnalls. pp. 79–81.
- Cottret, Bernard (2000) [1995], Calvin: Biographie [Calvin: A Biography] (in French), Translated by M. Wallace McDonald, Grand Rapids, Michigan: Wm. B. Eerdmans, ISBN 978-0-8028-3159-0
- De Greef, Wulfert (2004), "Calvin's writings", in McKim, Donald K. (ed.), The Cambridge Companion to John Calvin, Cambridge: Cambridge University Press, ISBN 978-0-521-01672-8
- Greef, Wulfert (2008). The writings of John Calvin: an introductory guide. Westminster: John Knox Press.
- Kingdon, Robert M (2003). "CALVIN, JOHN (1509–1564)" (PDF). In Hillerbrand, Hans (ed.). Encyclopedia of Protestantism. Routledge. Archived from the original (PDF) on 2004-12-28.
- MacCulloch, Diarmaid (2009). A History of Christianity: The First Three Thousand Years. Allen Lane. ISBN 978-0-7139-9869-6.
- McGrath, Alister E. (1990), A Life of John Calvin, Oxford: Basil Blackwell, ISBN 978-0-631-16398-5.
- Paquin, René (2000). "Calvin and Theocracy in Geneva: Church and World in Ordered Tasks". Arc: The Journal of the Faculty of Religious Studies. 28: 91–113. doi:10.26443/arc.v28i.907.
- Parker, T. H. L. (2006). John Calvin: A Biography. Oxford: Lion Hudson plc. ISBN 978-0-7459-5228-4.
- Pauck, Wilhelm (1929), "Calvin and Butzer", The Journal of Religion, 9 (2), Chicago: The University of Chicago Press: 237–256, doi:10.1086/480825, S2CID 170560215
- Schaff, Philip (1907). History of the Christian Church, Volume 7. Scribner's Sons.
- Schaff, Philip, ed. (1908). "Calvin, John". New Schaff-Herzog Encyclopedia of Religious Knowledge. Vol. II. New York: Funk & Wagnalls.
- Tosato-Rigo, Danièle (12 December 2014). "Réfugiés protestants [Protestant refugees]". Dictionnaire historique de la Suisse (in French). Académie suisse des sciences humaines et sociales.
- Van't Spijker, Willem (2009). Calvin: A brief guide to his life and thought. Westminster: John Knox Press.
