= Protestant Church of Geneva =

Protestant church in Switzerland

- Classification: Protestant
- Orientation: Continental Reformed
- Scripture: Protestant Bible
- Theology: Reformed
- Polity: Presbyterian
- President: Chantal Eberlé
- General Secretary: Stefan Keller
- Fellowships: Full communion; Protestant churches of the Protestant Church of Switzerland (since 1920); Partnership relations; Reformed Churches of Bern-Jura-Solothurn; EERF; Evangelical Reformed Church in Valais; EERV; Zurich Reformed Church
- Associations: Protestant Church of Switzerland
- Region: Canton of Geneva
- Founder: Guillaume Farel (led the Genevan Reformation); Jean Calvin (shaped Reformed theology and established Geneva's church order)
- Separated from: Roman Catholic Church (1535, confirmed by the 1541 ordinances)
- Members: 45'000 (in 2024)
- Ministers: 56
- Official website: epg.ch

The Protestant Church of Geneva (French: Église protestante de Genève; EPG) is a Swiss organization of congregations in the Canton of Geneva. It was founded in 1536 during the Protestant Reformation. It was the state church of Geneva from its inception until 1907. As part of the implementation of John Calvin's Ecclesiastical Ordinances, the ministers of the church are organized in the Company of Pastors, and the Genevan Consistory functions as a sort of parliament of the church.

== History ==
In the early 16th century, Geneva was an imperial city surrounded by the lands of the Duke of Savoy, whose local sovereign, the prince-bishop Pierre de La Baume, was closely aligned with Savoyard interests. Beginning in the 1520s, the city pursued political emancipation, concluding a treaty with Fribourg and Bern in 1526 that secured Swiss military and diplomatic backing against Savoy. Around the same time, Reformation ideas reached Geneva through the preaching of Guillaume Farel, Antoine Froment and Pierre Viret. The Mass was abolished on 10 August 1535, and on 21 May 1536 the General Council formally adopted the Reformation.

In 1536 John Calvin, passing through Geneva on his way to Strasbourg, was persuaded by Farel to remain and help organize the new church. Conflict with the city council over ecclesiastical discipline led to the expulsion of both men in 1538, and Calvin spent the following years in Strasbourg ministering to the French refugee community there. Recalled by the authorities in 1541, he secured the adoption of the Ecclesiastical Ordinances, which gave the church its legal foundation and established the Consistory, a body of pastors and lay elders charged with overseeing moral and religious discipline. These institutions framed the Genevan church throughout the Ancien Régime.

Geneva's reputation as a refuge drew waves of Protestants fleeing persecution across Europe, especially from France, England, Lucca and the Low Countries, and the city's population doubled between 1545 and 1560. This influx gave Geneva cultural and intellectual energy and earned it the nickname the "Protestant Rome". In 1559 Calvin founded the Academy of Geneva as a centre of higher learning in theology, letters and law, with Theodore Beza as its first rector. After Calvin's death in 1564, Beza succeeded him at the head of the Company of Pastors and remained the leading figure of Genevan Protestantism for the next forty years.

In the 18th century, leading figures of the Enlightenment challenged the place of religion in public life. The Geneva-born Jean-Jacques Rousseau and Voltaire, who settled near the city, both maintained an ambivalent and often conflictual relationship with the Genevan ecclesiastical establishment. Even so, the Constitution of 1794 still reserved citizenship to Protestants alone. Following French occupation in 1798, Roman Catholic worship was restored in the city. Geneva's entry into the Swiss Confederation in 1815, together with the attachment of predominantly Catholic communes from Savoy and France, made it one of the few confessionally mixed Swiss cantons in the 19th century.

The revolution of 1846 reshaped the Protestant church by giving laypeople a larger role in its governance. In 1873 the government of Antoine Carteret created the Christian Catholic Church, a body independent of Rome, and expelled the priest Gaspard Mermillod, who had sought to re-establish a Catholic bishopric in the city. Tensions tied to the Kulturkampf continued into the early 20th century, and in 1907 the Grand Council of Geneva voted to abolish the state budget for religion, formally separating church and state in the canton.

== Beliefs ==
Female ordination is allowed.

In 2019, the church adopted an inclusive vision and celebrates both opposite-sex marriages and same-sex marriages.
