= Jacques Gruet =

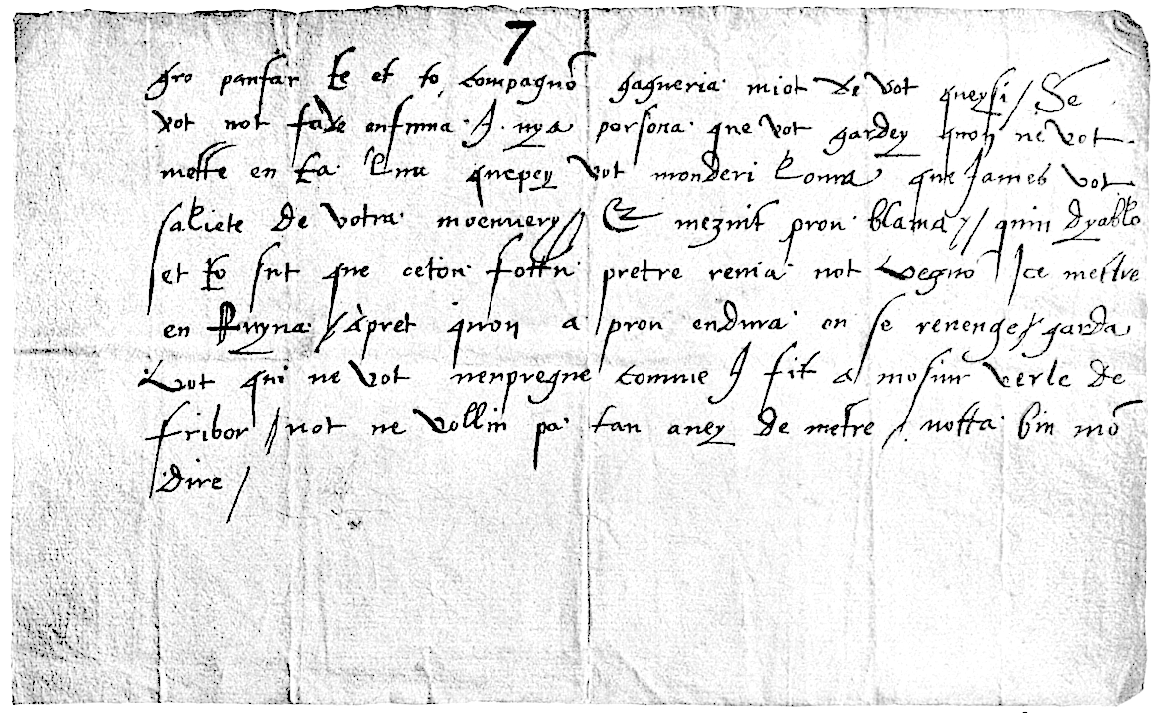
1547 note from Jacques Gruet.

Jacques Gruet (died July 26, 1547) was a notary put to death in Geneva for allegedly threatening John Calvin.

== Family and life ==
Jacques Gruet was the son of Humbert Gruet, a notary public of Geneva. Humbert died in 1513, and Gruet's mother died after 1522. He also had a sister, Hugonine, who died in 1538. Gruet's business contacts included André Philippe, a noted opponent of Calvin and the son of Jean Philippe, who had been executed in 1540. At the time of his death, Gruet lived in a large house at Place du Bourg-de-Four near Porte du Chastel and St. Pierre Cathedral.

In Geneva, he was influenced by Ami Perrin and Françoise Favre, and opposed to John Calvin's influence in the city and defied conservative laws in the city. He was suspected of attempting to poison theologian Pierre Viret in 1535 and was once prosecuted for dancing. He was known for his love of wine and for wearing chausses chapplée, a style of trousers that scandalized the city with their shortness. He may have served as a monk earlier in his life.

== Prosecution and death ==
Gruet was seen as a leader of opposition to Calvin's leadership, although he may not have been a member of the main opposition associations, "The Patriots" and the "spirituals". This group included Gruet, Perrin, the Favre brothers, Claude Franc, François Berthelier, and André Philippe.

On June 27, 1547, a threatening note was found on St. Pierre Cathedral. The note threatened Calvin and fellow minister Abel Poupin, referring to the recent stabbing of another religious leader, Verli de Fribourg. The next day, Gruet was accused and arrested. Gruet's home was searched and papers were found which showed Gruet's opposition to the religious leaders of the town. On July 2, 1547, Calvin wrote a letter to his friend Pierre Viret in which Calvin stated that although many suspected Gruet of writing the note, the note was not in Gruet's hand. Calvin further stated that the search of Gruet's papers uncovered a number of documents which Calvin described as follows: "a humble petition which he had designed to present to the people in the Assemblies, in which he contended that no offence should be punished by the laws but what was injurious to the state; for that such was the practice of the Venetians, who were the highest authority in the matter of government; and that in truth there was danger with this city submitted to be ruled by the brain of one man of melancholy temperament, of a thousand citizens being destroyed in the event of any outbreak. Letters were also found, clearly written to Andre Philippe, and to others. In some he named me; at other times, he had enveloped me in figures of speech, so clumsily contrived, however, that one could lay his finger on what he meant to conceal. There were, besides, two pages in Latin, in which the whole of Scripture is laughed at, Christ aspersed, the immortality of the soul called a dream and a fable, and finally the whole of religion torn in pieces. I do not think he is the author of it; but as it is in his handwriting, he will be compelled to appear in his defence, although, it may be, that he has himself thrown into the form of a memorandum according to the turn of his own genius, what he heard from others;" Imprisoned for a month, he was tortured and confessed to libeling Calvin, but did not name any accomplices. The day of his death, Gruet was marched from his prison at l'Eveche to the Hôtel de Ville, a route which brought him past his own home. He was beheaded on July 26, 1547.

=== Burning of Gruet's writings ===
In 1549, a book with anti-Christian writings by Gruet was found in Gruet's house. While Calvin himself had not taken direct part in Gruet's trial and execution, he was asked what to do about this book, and together with Geneva religious leaders, it was decided that the book should be burned. The public burning took place on May 25, 1550.

== Sources ==
- Berriot, François. "Un procès d'athéisme à Genève: l'affaire Gruet (1547-1550)." Bulletin de la Société de l'Histoire du Protestantisme Français (1903-) (1979): 577–592.
