= Consistory (Protestantism) =

Ruling body in some Protestant churches

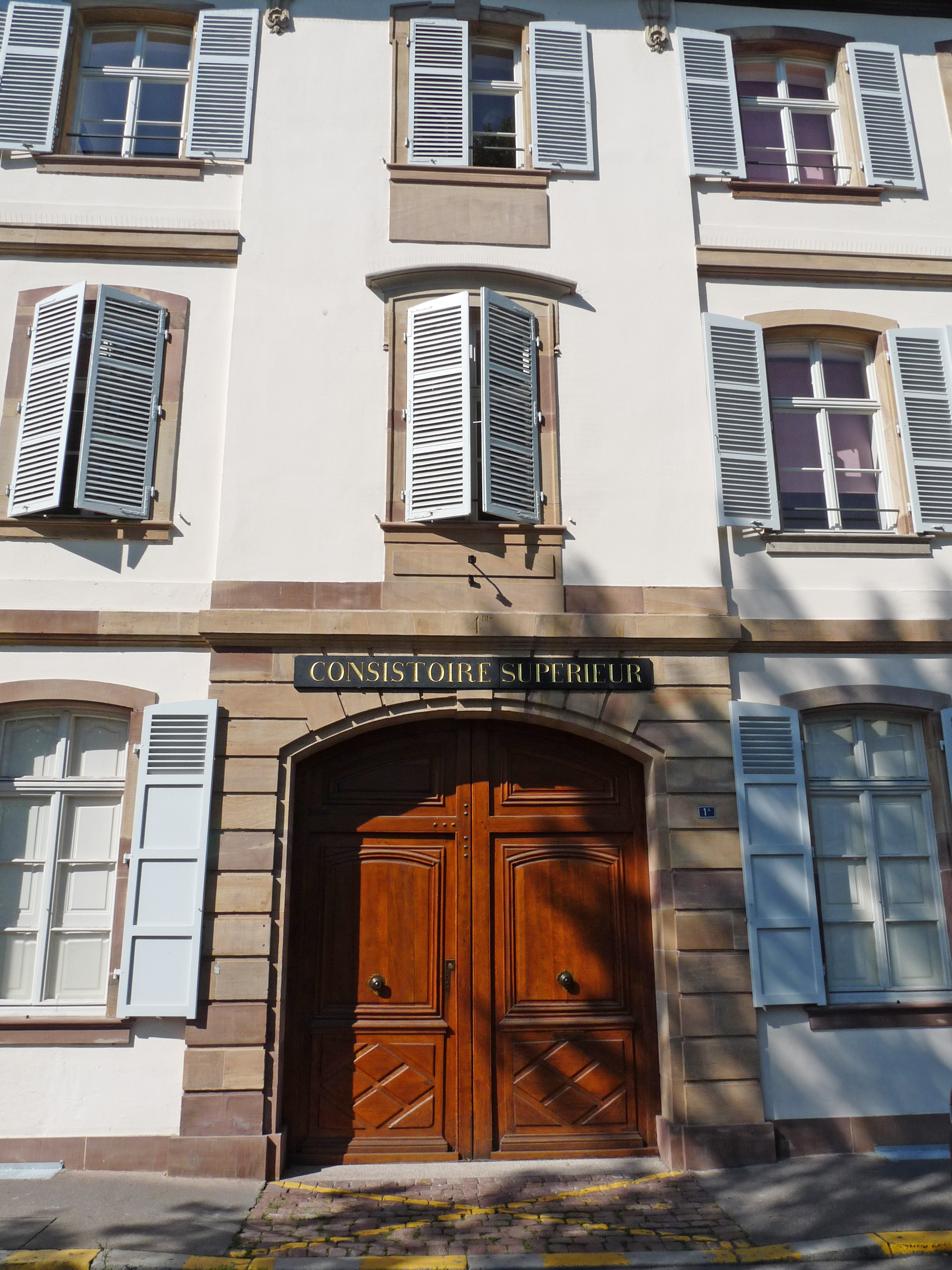
EPCAAL's Supreme Consistory in Strasbourg

In Protestant usage, a consistory designates certain ruling bodies in various churches. The meaning and the scope of functions varies strongly, also along the separating lines of the Protestant denominations and church bodies.

== History ==
Starting in 1539 the term was used for a body taking over the jurisdiction in marital matters, and later also church discipline, so that Protestant consistories can be regarded as successors not to the papal consistory in Rome but rather to the courts of Roman Catholic bishops. In the Lutheran or Reformed states of imperial immediacy in the Holy Roman Empire episcopal offices were not staffed any more and the secular government assumed the function of the bishop (summepiscopate, summus episcopus), looked after by the consistories.

Not all Protestant churches adopted consistories, especially not collegially governed churches, often of Reformed or Presbyterian confession. Consistories were either bodies of local churches (mostly in the Reformed tradition), or parastatal entities, like in the French model, or they were governing bodies as part of the administration of Protestant state churches (Lutheran, Reformed and United Protestant alike). The rather governmental character of the consistory is the reason why the term was given up in many church bodies after the separation of religion and state and the concomitant abolition of the status as state church and the assumption of church independence.

In countries under French influence the Protestants, Calvinists and Lutherans alike (and the Jews as well, see Israelite consistories), made use of the term in the beginning of the nineteenth century with the enactment of the Organic Articles, when the movement for political emancipation demanded the creation of a representative body, whereas Napoleon's government simultaneously aimed at gaining influence onto the non-Catholic religious bodies. Roman Catholicism in Napoleon's realm was subject to the Concordat of 1801. The consistories in the French Empire could transact official business with a government in the name of the Protestants and vice versa. Furthermore, the desire for reform among the educated classes demanded the creation of a body vested with authority to render religious decisions.

== Anglican usage ==
"In Anglican churches the consistory is the diocesan court, usually presided over by the bishop's chancellor or commissary. It deals with a variety of issues at the diocesan level, and its decisions may be appealed to higher courts in the national church."

== Usage in Lutheran and united churches ==
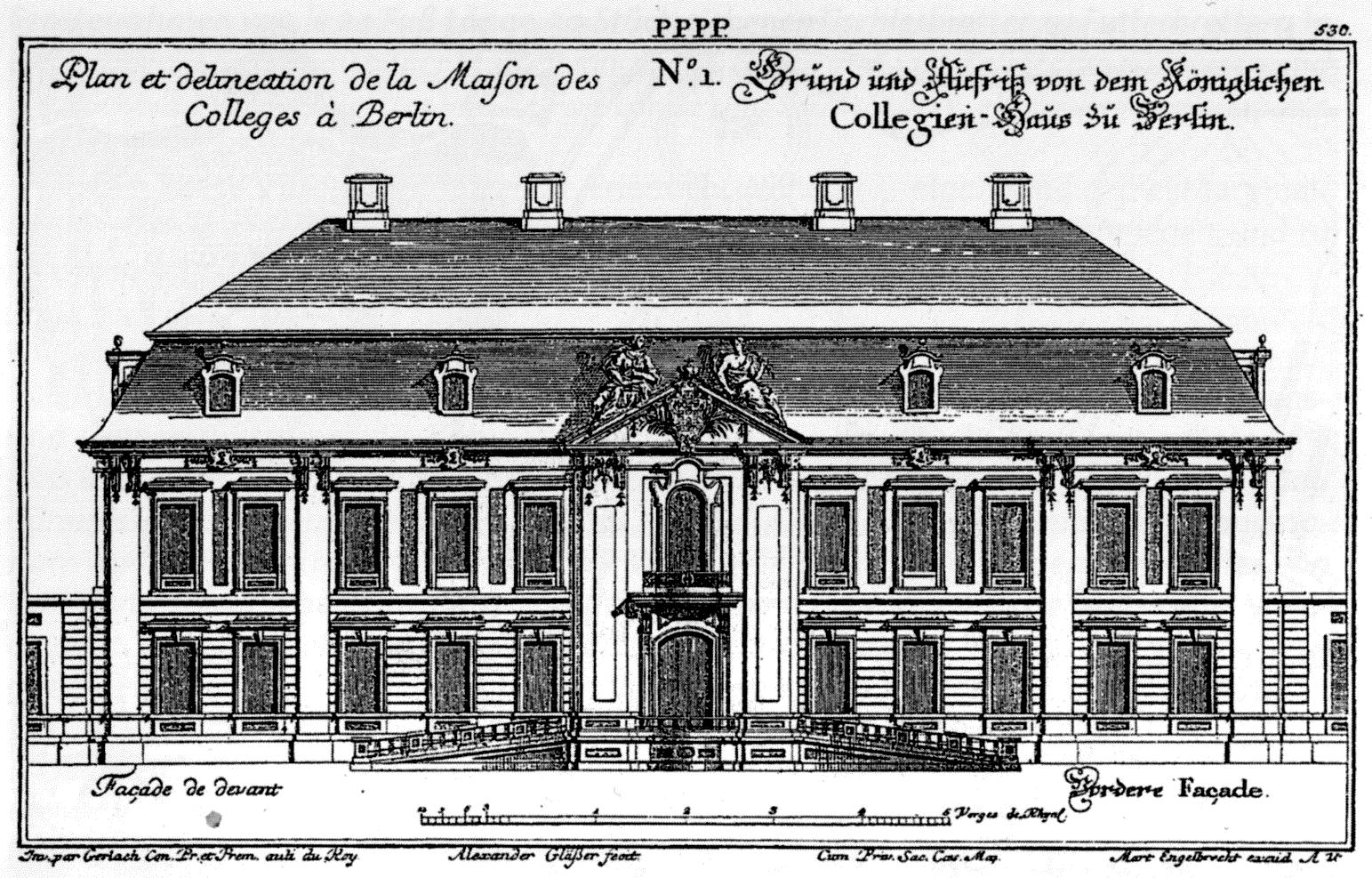
APU's Berlin Consistory sat in the Collegienhaus between 1737 and 1826, sharing it with the Kammergericht, and again from 1913 to 1945 as the sole user.

In the Lutheran tradition, and derived from that similarly in some united and uniting Protestant churches, the consistory is a body governing the ecclesiastical affairs in a specific ambit, comprising either all congregations (aka parishes) within a Protestant church body (thus forming a leading body, with executive and /or spiritual competence for a church), or only those in a district organisation (consistorial district; German: Konsistorialbezirk) or in a regional organisation (such as an ecclesiastical province; German: Kirchenprovinz). In the latter two cases, typical in churches with a congregational polity, the term consistory is also used to designate the geographical area administered by the consistory.

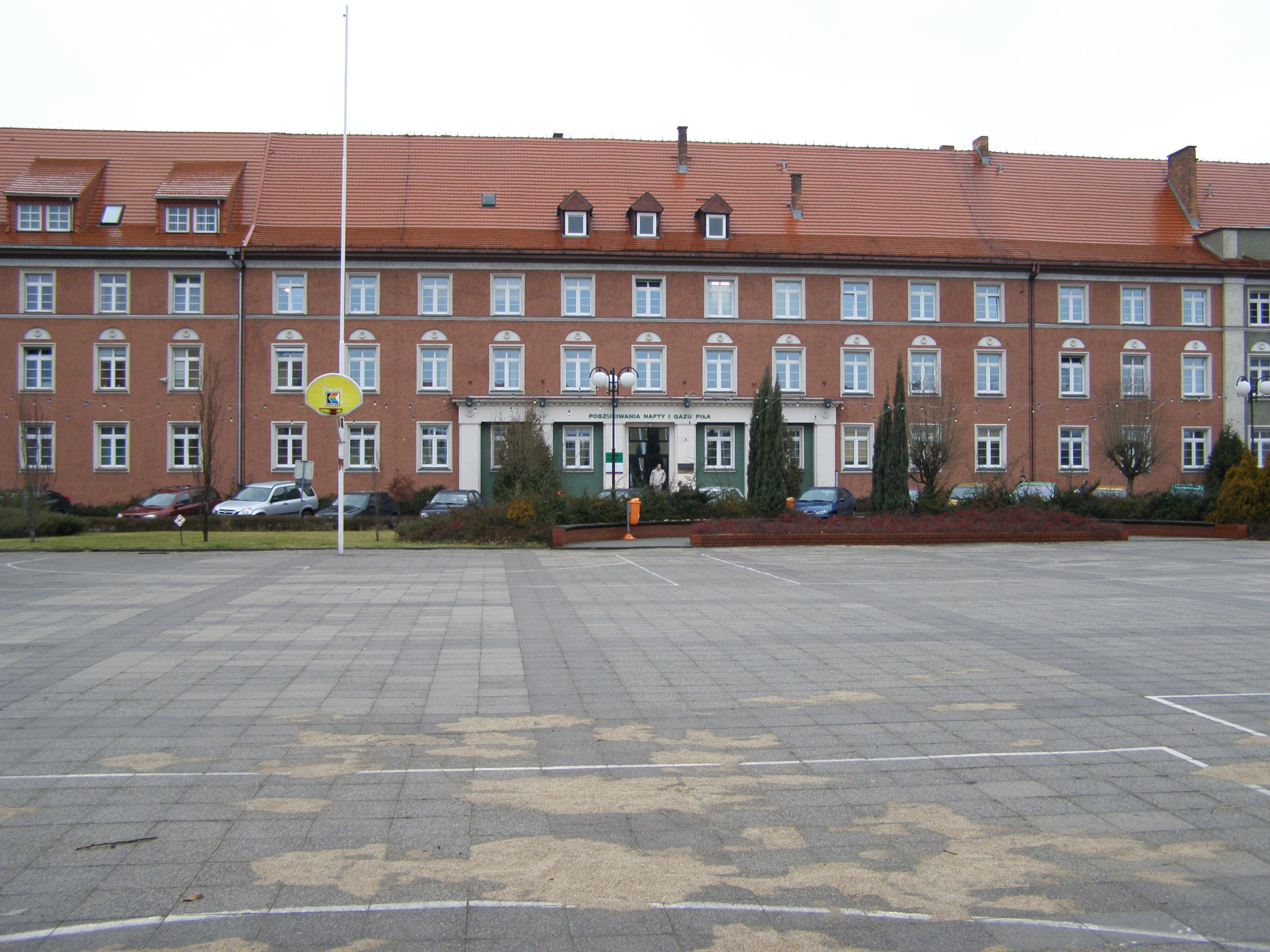
APU's former Posen-West Prussia Consistory, now the office of an oil and gas drilling company in Piła.

In 1539 Martin Luther and his associates established the Wittenberg Consistory (1539–1816) in Wittenberg upon Elbe competent for the Lutheran church in the Saxon Electoral District within the then realm of the Ernestine line of the House of Wettin. Although originally an ecclesiastical court of the Saxon Lutheran church, the consistory developed into an administrative body appointed by the sovereign to supervise the church within his state. In other Lutheran states the consistories took similar developments.

Consistories, forming executive body of a state church, had often great powers through the authority of the secular government. In history, before separating executive and juridical competences, consistories of Lutheran state churches with central executive powers, therefore usually consisting of jurisprudents and clergy, did also function as courts appointed to regulate ecclesiastical affairs. At times the consistories were parastatal offices in charge of all (Protestant) denominations (e.g. in Bremen-Verden) or even all religions (e.g. in Prussia, see Evangelical Church in Prussia from 1808 to 1816) in the respective territory. While Lutheran churches often still did not form legal entities distinct from the state, the consistories turned out to be the oldest body of many modern regional Protestant church bodies, which developed into independent legal entities in the 18th and 19th centuries.

By the French Organic Articles each time several parishes (paroisses) of the EPCAAL form a consistory (consistoire), terming the board and its district alike. The consistories are religious statutory law corporations of legal entity status. Each consistory holds property of its own and receives contributions by the member parishes. Each EPCAAL consistory comprises all the pastors active in its district and the double number of laypersons, elected in three year terms by the local church presbyteries, as well as some members co-opted by the church executive Directory (directoire). The consistorial members elect from their midst their executive, the consistorial council (Conseil consistorial) of four members. Consistorial decisions are presented to the French minister of the Interior, who may oppose them within a two-month period, and reported to the superior EPCAAL Supreme consistory (Consistoire supérieur).

== Reformed usage ==
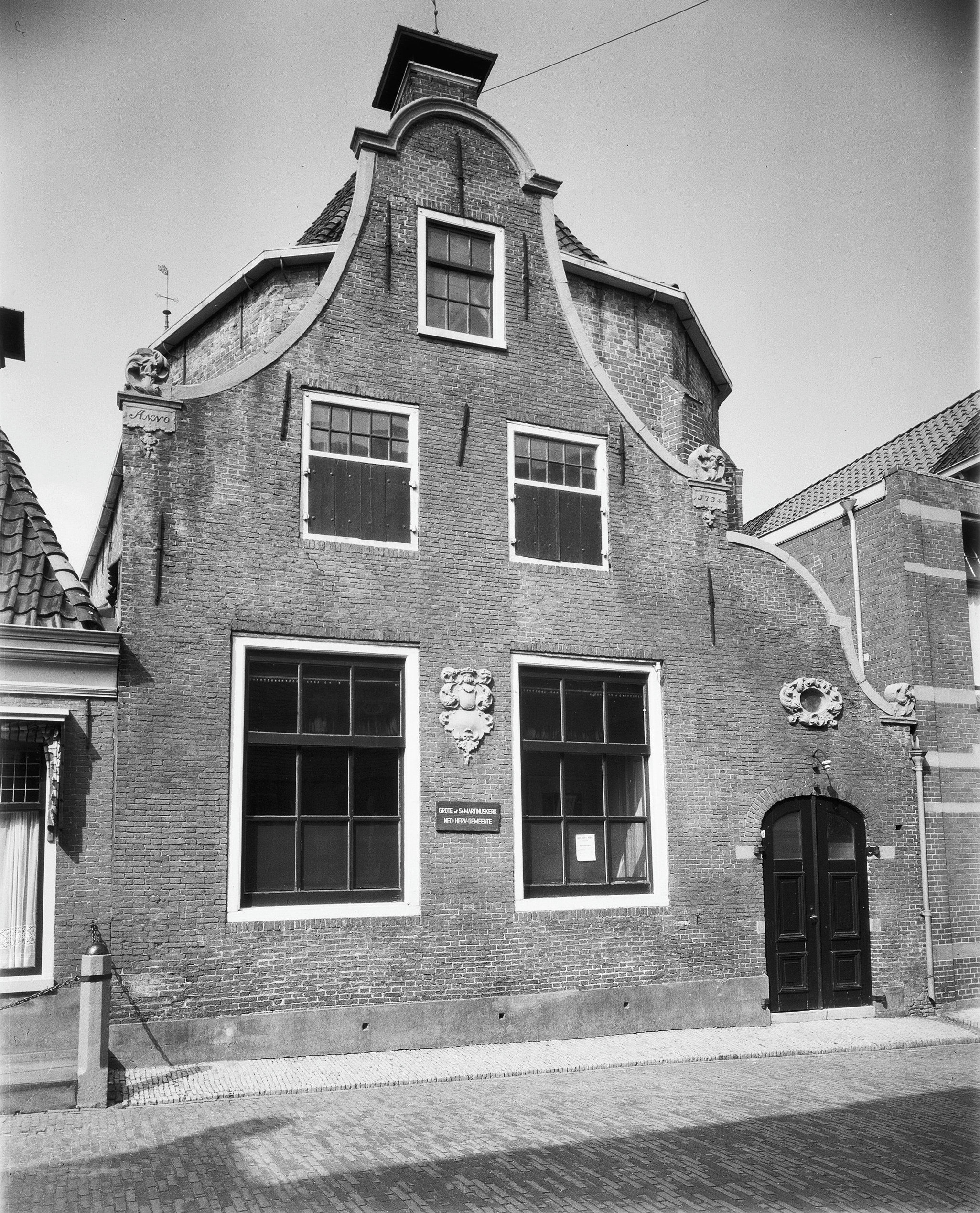
The Dokkum Consistoriekamer (consistorial chamber), venue of the Reformed local church elders.

In the Reformed (Calvinist) tradition the consistory is the authority in the local church, generally made up of all the teaching Elders (ministers) and the ruling elders (lay leaders). The consistory then forms the head of individual congregations (or parishes) also in charge of implementing the policies of the synod and/or assembly of which it is part, and providing for church discipline of the church members where necessary. A panel sometimes called the Great Consistory, convoked if considered necessary for special consultations, would include the current consistory and former elders and deacons. Congregations (kerkgemeenten) within the Protestant Church in the Netherlands rooted in the 2004-merged Dutch Reformed Church often call their local church councils consistorial chamber or consistorie (consistory, else also called kerkenraad, i.e. church council).

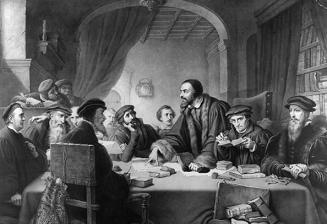
EPG's Genevan Consistory: Session in the time of Calvin.

When John Calvin was invited to take over supervision of the Reformed Church of Geneva (EPG), he insisted on the creation there of a new disciplinary institution called the Consistory, and drafted the ecclesiastical ordinances that created it himself in November 1541. The Genevan Consistory consisted of all the pastors on the Republic of Geneva's payroll plus a dozen lay commissioners or elders to whom were assigned the duty of visiting households and checking upon the conduct of the inhabitants. The members of the consistory, technically a committee of the city government, were elected for one-year terms in the elections in which the city government was reconstituted every year.

In weekly meetings the consistory examined people accused of misbehaviour. If the charges proved of substance, the consistory had a range of options including referring the person for counselling or, in more severe cases, to the civil courts. "In 1555, excommunication was added to its powers." About one-fifteenth of the entire adult population of the republic was annually summoned before the consistory. As much as Calvin's theology with his emphasis on church discipline, the Genevan Consistory gave the city-state particular and the Reformed Church of Geneva its unique lifestyle.

Also in the Protestant Reformed Church of Alsace and Lorraine (EPRAL) several parishes form a consistory (consistoire), with the term used for the board and its district alike. As religious statutory law corporations the consistories have legal entity status, holding property of their own and receiving contributions from member parishes. EPRAL consistories are made up and organised like their EPCAAL counterparts (see above). Unlike their EPCAAL counterparts the EPRAL consistories appoint the pastors after proposition by the presbytery of the concerned parish.

== Consistories today ==
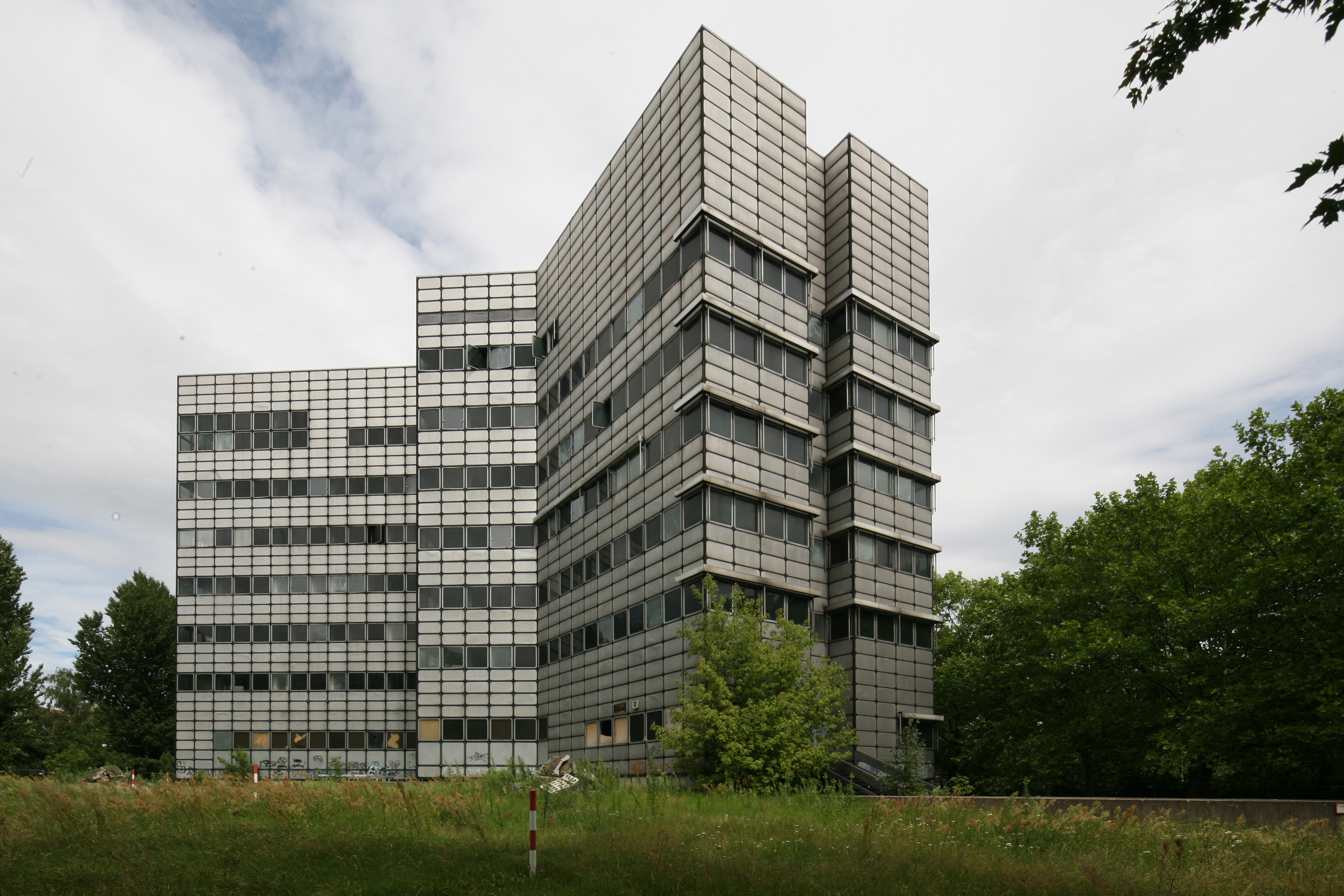
EKBO's Berlin Consistory, former building

The Evangelical Church of Berlin-Brandenburg-Silesian Upper Lusatia (EKBO, a church comprising Lutheran, Reformed and united congregations) uses the term consistory (Berlin Consistory) for its administrative office. This consistory was founded in 1543 and underwent a number of alterations of its official naming and functions in compliance with the development of the constitution of the church. Also the Evangelical Lutheran Church of Latvia and the Protestant Church of Luxembourg (Consistoire de l'Eglise Protestante du Luxembourg) use the term consistory for their central administrative offices.

The Lutheran Protestant Church of Augsburg Confession of Alsace and Lorraine (EPCAAL) maintains its Supreme Consistory (Consistoire supérieur), functioning as the supreme spiritual body, and 40 regional consistories, established in 1802 but later partially reorganised and renamed. In the Lutheran Evangelical Church of the Augsburg Confession in Poland the Consistory of the Church (Polish: Konsystorz Kościoła) serves as the chief administrative authority and the executive board of the synod.

In the Estonian Evangelical Lutheran Church the consistory (konsistoorium) is the administrative board of the church. In 2006 the Evangelical Lutheran Church in European Russia established a consistory (Консистория) as its central executive body. In the Evangelical Reformed Church in the Republic of Poland the administrative body is termed as consistory (Konsystorz). In the Protestant Reformed Church of Alsace and Lorraine four consistories form district organisations each comprising several parishes.

== Consistories renamed ==
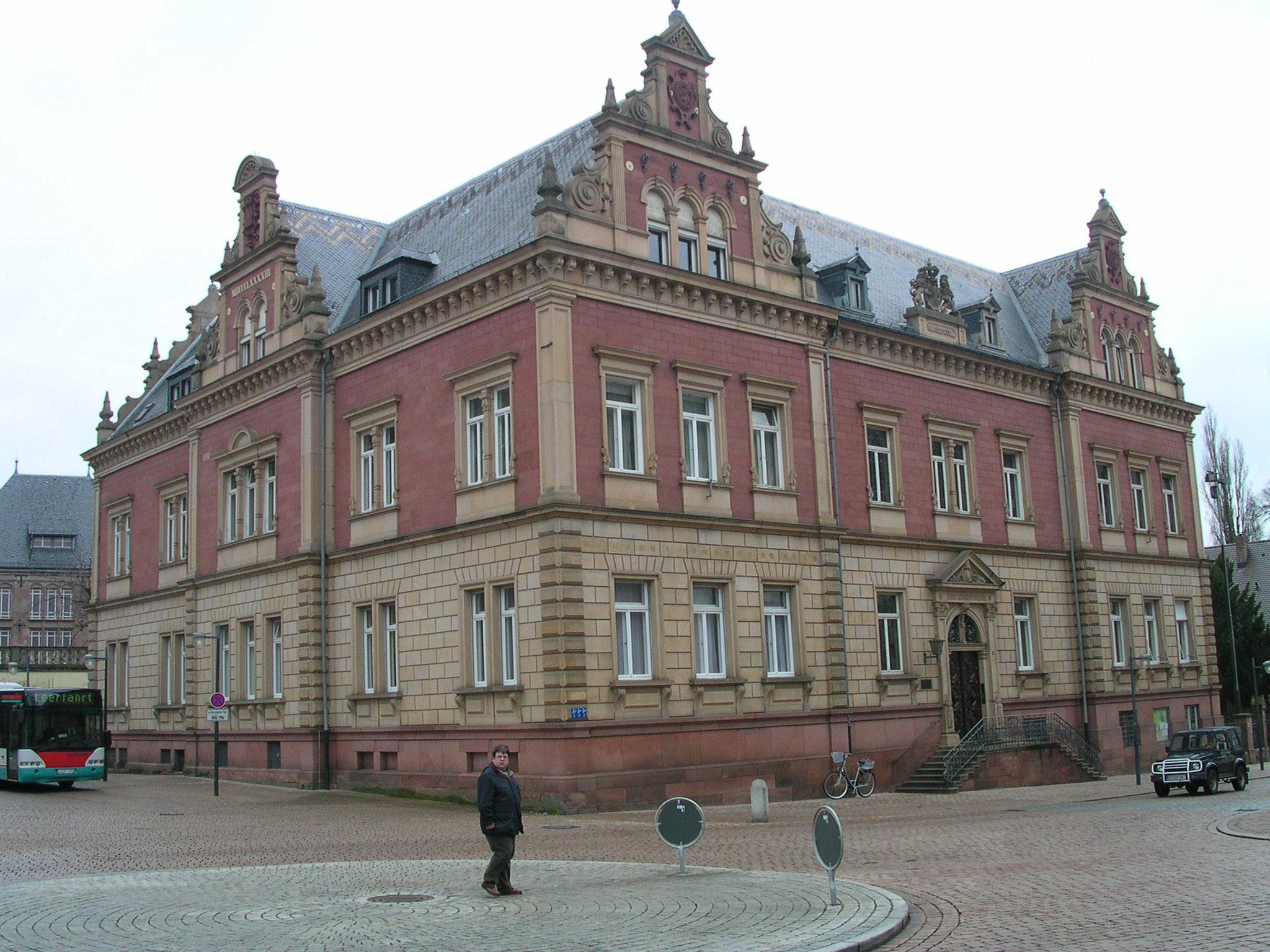
Palatine Regional Church Council, called the Speyer Consistory until 1921

- The Supreme Consistory (Oberkonsistorium) of the Evangelical Lutheran Church in Bavaria, founded in 1818 was replaced as a decision-taking body by the Landeskirchenrat (Regional Church Council) in 1920. Its administration division was renamed Munich Church Office.
- The regional consistory (Landeskonsistorium) of the Evangelical Lutheran State Church of Hanover was renamed Landeskirchenamt (Regional Church Office) in 1924.
- The consistory (Konsistorium) of the Evangelical Regional Church in Hesse-Cassel was renamed Landeskirchenamt (Regional Church Office) in 1924.
- The consistory of the Church of Lippe was renamed Landeskirchenamt in 1931.
- The Speyer Consistory (Konsistorium Speyer), founded in 1818, of the Evangelical Church of the Palatinate was replaced by the Landeskirchenrat (regional church council) in 1921.
- The consistory of the Pomeranian Evangelical Church (PEK), after having been established in 1653, then reorganised, moved and renamed several times, was converted into the Pommersche Kirchenkreisverwaltung (Pomeranian Deanery Administration) in 2012.

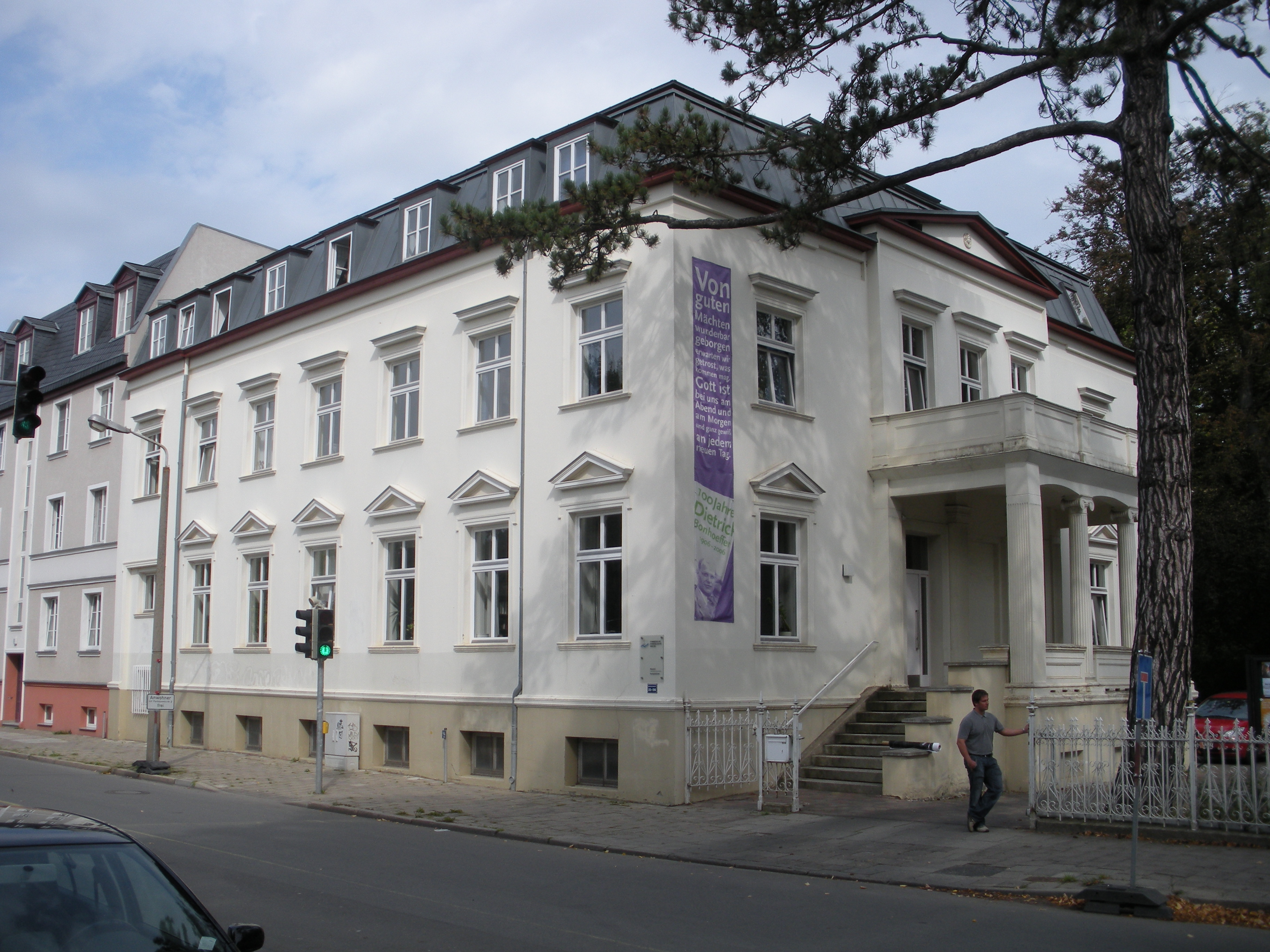
Pomeranian Church District Administration, called the PEK's Greifswald Consistory until 2012

- The consistory (Evangelisches Konsistorium) of the Evangelical Church in the Rhineland was renamed Landeskirchenamt in 1948.
- The consistory (Evangelisches Konsistorium) of the Evangelical Church of the Church Province of Saxony was transformed into the Kirchenamt der Föderation Evangelischer Kirchen in Mitteldeutschland (church office of the Federation of Evangelical Churches in Middle Germany).
- The consistory of the Evangelical-Lutheran Church of Saxony was renamed the Saxony Regional Church Office in 1933.
- The consistory (Evangelisches Konsistorium) of the Evangelical Church of Westphalia was renamed the Regional Church Office (Landeskirchenamt) in 1948.

== Designations for members ==
The designations for the members of consistories alter as to their functions and status as clergy or laymen. In German Konsistorialrat (consistorial councillor) and Konsistorialassessor (consistorial assessor) are each used to term both. Consistories often had double leadership, one lay and one cleric. The lay leader is often called Konsistorialpräsident or Konsistorialdirektor (consistorial president or director), by vocation usually a jurisprudent, while the cleric leaders could be termed Generalsuperintendent or just Superintendent (general superintendent or superintendent), or provost (Propst, as with EKBO).

== See also ==
- Millet (Ottoman Empire)
