= Place du Bourg-de-Four =

Square in Geneva, Switzerland

Coordinates: 46.20024°N 6.14922°E

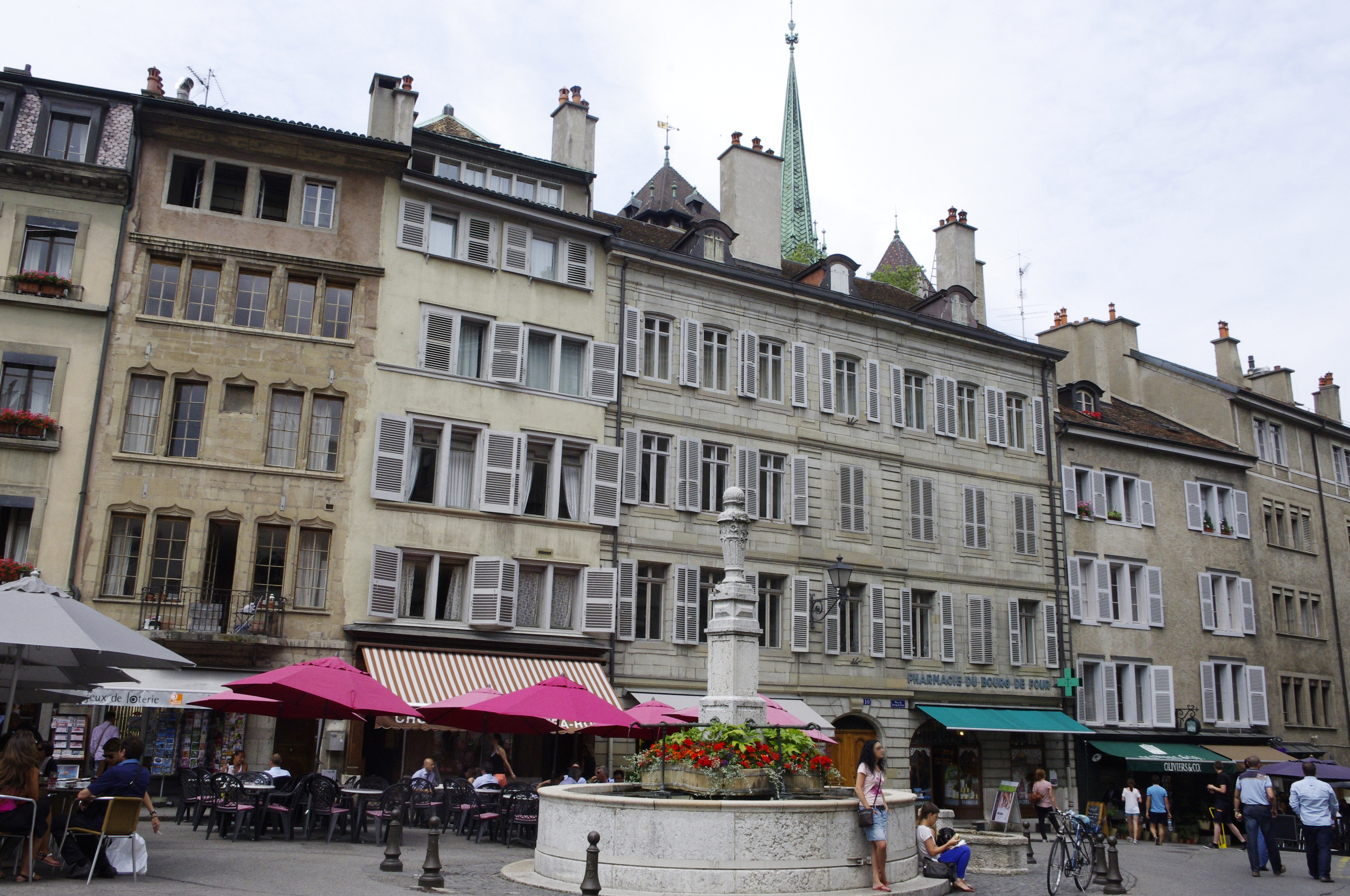
Place du Bourg-de-Four

Place du Bourg-de-Four is a cobblestone square in the Old Town of Geneva, Switzerland. Located on the site of the old Roman forum and medieval market, it served as a stagecoach stop in the 19th century. It is now a popular meeting place with restaurants and cafes surrounding a small marble 18th-century fountain. The Place du Bourg-de-Four is near the St. Pierre Cathedral.
