= Two kingdoms doctrine =

Protestant Christian doctrine

The two kingdoms doctrine is a Protestant Christian theological concept that divides God's rule into two realms: the spiritual kingdom, where God governs through the gospel and the Church, and the earthly kingdom, where God governs through law and civil authority. The doctrine is held by Lutherans and represents the view of some Reformed Christians. John Calvin significantly modified Martin Luther's original two kingdoms doctrine, and certain neo-Calvinists have adopted a different view known as transformationalism.

The two kingdoms doctrine is held in Anabaptism, which teaches that there exist two kingdoms on Earth that do not share communion with one another. This doctrine states that while people of the kingdom of this world use weapons to fight one another, those of the kingdom of Christ strive to follow Jesus.

== Theology ==
=== Lutheranism ===
Augustine's model of the City of God was the foundation for Martin Luther's doctrine, but Luther goes farther. According to the two kingdom doctrine, the spiritual kingdom, made up of true Christians, does not need the sword. The biblical passages dealing with justice and retribution, therefore, are only in reference to the temporal (natural) kingdom. Luther also uses this idea to describe the relationship of the church to the state. He states that the temporal kingdom has no authority in matters pertaining to the spiritual kingdom. He points to the way in which the Roman Catholic Church had involved itself in secular affairs, and princes' involvement in religious matters, especially the ban on printing the New Testament.

God has therefore ordained two regiment(s): the spiritual which by the Holy Spirit produces Christians and pious folk under Christ, and the secular which restrains un-Christian and evil folk, so that they are obliged to keep outward peace, albeit by no merit of their own

— Martin Luther

This law-gospel distinction parallels and amplifies Luther's doctrine of Christians being at the same time saint and sinner, a citizen of both kingdoms. Luther describes them as slaves of sin, the law, and death while alive and existing in the natural kingdom, but when dead in Christ, they become instead lords over sin, the law, and death. The law-gospel distinction can be traced back to Philip Melancthon's 1521 commentary on Romans, and Melancthon's 1521 Loci Communes.

=== Reformed ===
John Calvin, as well as later Reformed orthodox figures, clearly distinguish between God's redemptive work of salvation and earthly work of providence. Scottish theologian Andrew Melville is especially well known for articulating this doctrine, and the Scottish Second Book of Discipline clearly defined the spheres of civil and ecclesiastical authorities. Orthodox theologians such as Samuel Rutherford also used the Reformed concept and terminology of the two kingdoms. Francis Turretin further developed the doctrine by linking the temporal kingdom with Christ's status as eternal God and creator of the world, and the spiritual kingdom with his status as incarnate son of God and redeemer of humanity.

The Reformed application of the doctrine differed from the Lutheran in the matter of the external government of the church. Lutherans were content to allow the state to control the administration of the church, a view in the Reformed world shared by Thomas Erastus. In general, however, the Reformed followed Calvin's lead in insisting that the church's external administration, including the right to excommunicate, not be handed over to the state.

=== Anabaptism ===
Anabaptism adheres to "two kingdoms doctrine", which teaches that:

There are two different kingdoms on earth—namely, the kingdom of this world and the peaceful kingdom of Christ. These two kingdoms cannot share or have communion with each other. The people in the kingdom of this world are born of the flesh, are earthly and carnally minded. The people in the kingdom of Christ are reborn of the Holy Spirit, live according to the Spirit, and are spiritually minded. The people in the kingdom of the world are equipped for fighting with carnal weapons—spear, sword, armor, guns and powder. The people in Christ's kingdom are equipped with spiritual weapons—the armor of God, the shield of faith, and the sword of the Spirit to fight against the devil, the world, and their own flesh, together with all that arises against God and his Word. The people in the kingdom of this world fight for a perishable crown and an earthly kingdom. The people in Christ's kingdom fight for an imperishable crown and an eternal kingdom. Christ made these two kingdoms at variance with each other and separated. There will therefore be no peace between them. In the end, however, Christ will crush and destroy all the other kingdoms with his power and eternal kingdom. But his will remain eternally.

== Response and influence ==
Luther's articulation of the two kingdoms doctrine had little effect on the practical reality of church government in Lutheran territories during the Reformation. With the rise of cuius regio, eius religio, civil authorities had extensive influence on the shape of the church in their realm, and Luther was forced to cede much of the power previously granted to church officers starting in 1525. However, in Geneva John Calvin was able to establish a form of church government with much greater power under the Ecclesiastical Ordinances, but only after a significant struggle. Most significantly the Genevan Consistory was given the exclusive authority to excommunicate church members.

== See also ==
- Christianity and politics
- Separation of church and state
- Cultural mandate
- Law and Gospel
- Opposing perspectives
  - Caesaropapism
  - Christian reconstructionism
  - Dominion theology
  - Kingdom theology
  - Postmillennialism
  - Theonomy
- Political Catholicism
- Political theology
- "Render unto Caesar"
- Sphere sovereignty
- Symphonia (theology)
