= Guy Furbity =

16th-century Dominican theologian

Guy Furbity (fl. early 16th century) was a Dominican friar and a doctor of theology from the Sorbonne who was imprisoned for his opposition to the Genevan Reformation.

He was attached to the friary at Montmélian in Savoy.

He arrived in Geneva in December 1533 to preach during Advent. The vehemence of his attacks against the evangelical preachers provoked a response from Bern, which threatened to break its combourgeoisie (alliance) with Geneva unless Furbity retracted his statements.

Despite the interventions of the bishop, Pierre de la Baume the Genevan authorities imprisoned him and arranged for him to face William Farel in a public disputation held from 27 to 30 January 1534. Furbity remained in prison until April 1536, when the Genevan authorities released him at the request of King Francis I.
