= Disputation of Lausanne =

Event in the Protestant Reformation in 1536

- Date: 1 October 1536
- Location: Lausanne Cathedral
- Type: Disputation
- Theme: Ten theses of the Protestant faith
- Outcome: Vaud joins the Reformation

The Disputation of Lausanne was a disputatio that took place in Lausanne Cathedral from October 1 to 8, 1536, between Catholics and Protestants. At the end of the dispute, the Bernese authorities declared victory for the Protestant side and proclaimed edicts of Reformation that made Catholic worship illegal in the Vaud area.

== Background ==
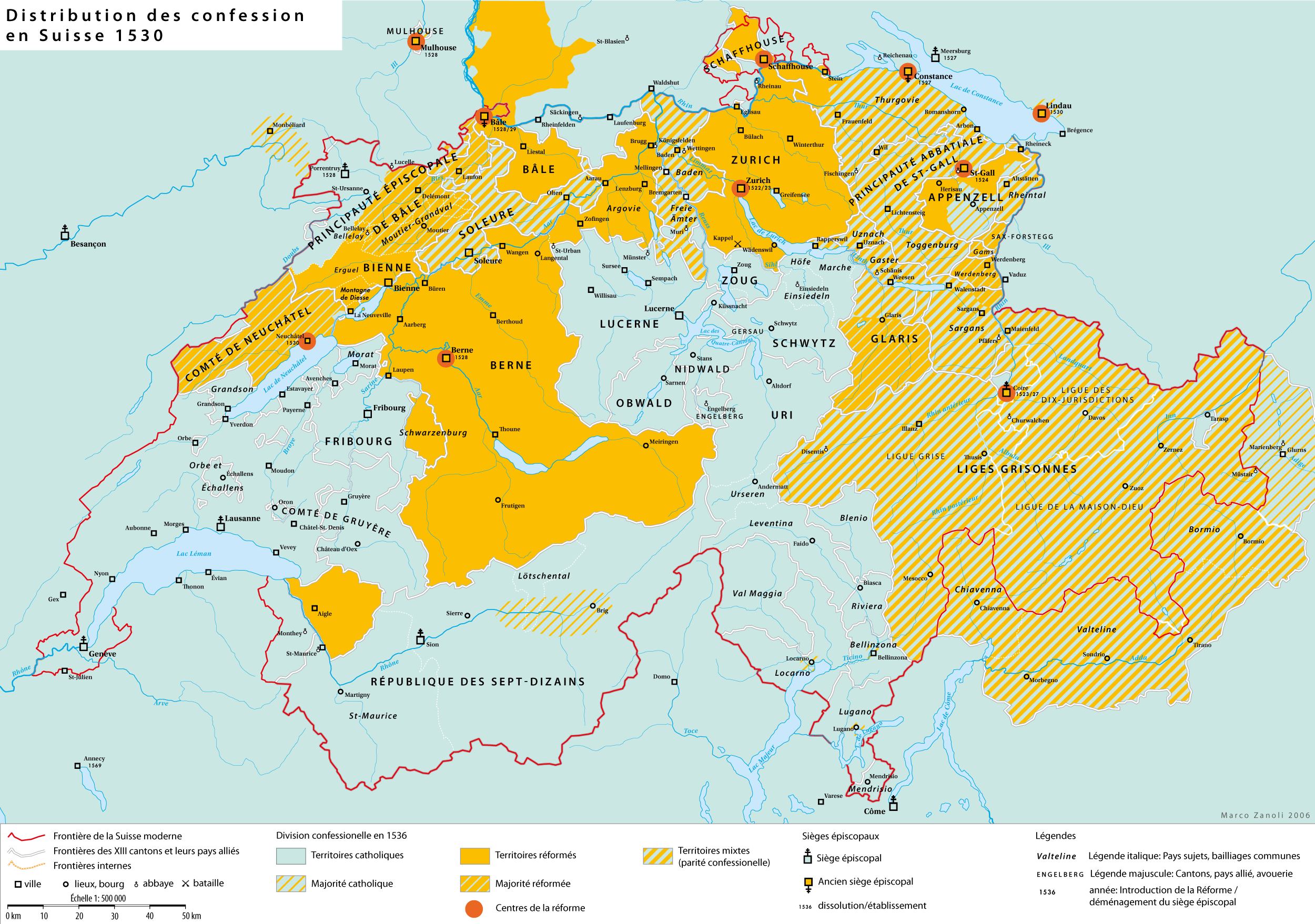
Reformed (orange) and Catholic (blue) territories in Switzerland in 1530.

At the beginning of the modern era, most of the territory corresponding to the current boundaries of the canton of Vaud was under the control of the House of Savoy. The second most powerful landowner was the Bishop of Lausanne, who ruled over a principality—the Episcopal Principality of Lausanne—over which he exercised both religious and temporal power, controlling lands in Lausanne itself as well as the entire area between the Veveyse and Venoge rivers.

In 1536, the canton of Bern conquered these lands, and both the lands controlled by the House of Savoy and the principality came under Bernese rule.

Religiously speaking, the Bern had converted to the Reformation in 1528 following a disputatio (the Disputation of Berne). When the Bernese troops arrived in Lausanne, however, the population of Vaud was Catholic. Locals did not welcome the various preachers, including William Farel, who came with the aim of converting them to the Protestant faith. The Bernese authorities decided to organize a disputatio at the Lausanne Cathedral, at the very heart of the power of the Episcopal Principality.

The Lausanne Disputation was not the first theological debate between Catholics and Protestants organized in Switzerland by supporters of the Protestant Reformation; what made it unique was that it was not organized by the magistrates of the city in which it took place, but by an external authority, namely the Bernese magistrate Hans Jakob von Wattenwyl.

== Overture ==
October 1, 1536, was the official opening day of the dispute, but the Bernese delegation was delayed and replaced by a simple inaugural session. Monday morning, October 2, was devoted to the question of where the authority of the biblical text came from. Indeed, accepting—as decided by the Bernese authorities—that the validity of the various theses be examined solely with reference to the Bible during the dispute required agreement on what was meant by evidence drawn from Scripture.

From the very first day of debate, the canons refused to participate in the discussion. They agreed with the Protestant camp that religious doctrine must derive from the perfect meaning of the Holy Scripture, but for them it was out of the question to discuss the Catholic faith and its dogmas anywhere other than within the general congregation of the faithful, i.e., at a council. On the Catholic side, therefore, it was men who were not canons who spoke up to defend the Catholic Church and its dogmas throughout the dispute. On the first morning it is a Dominican father, Dominique de Montbouson, who defends the Catholic position regarding the authority of the church.

== See also ==
- Reformation in Switzerland
