= Genevan Reformation =

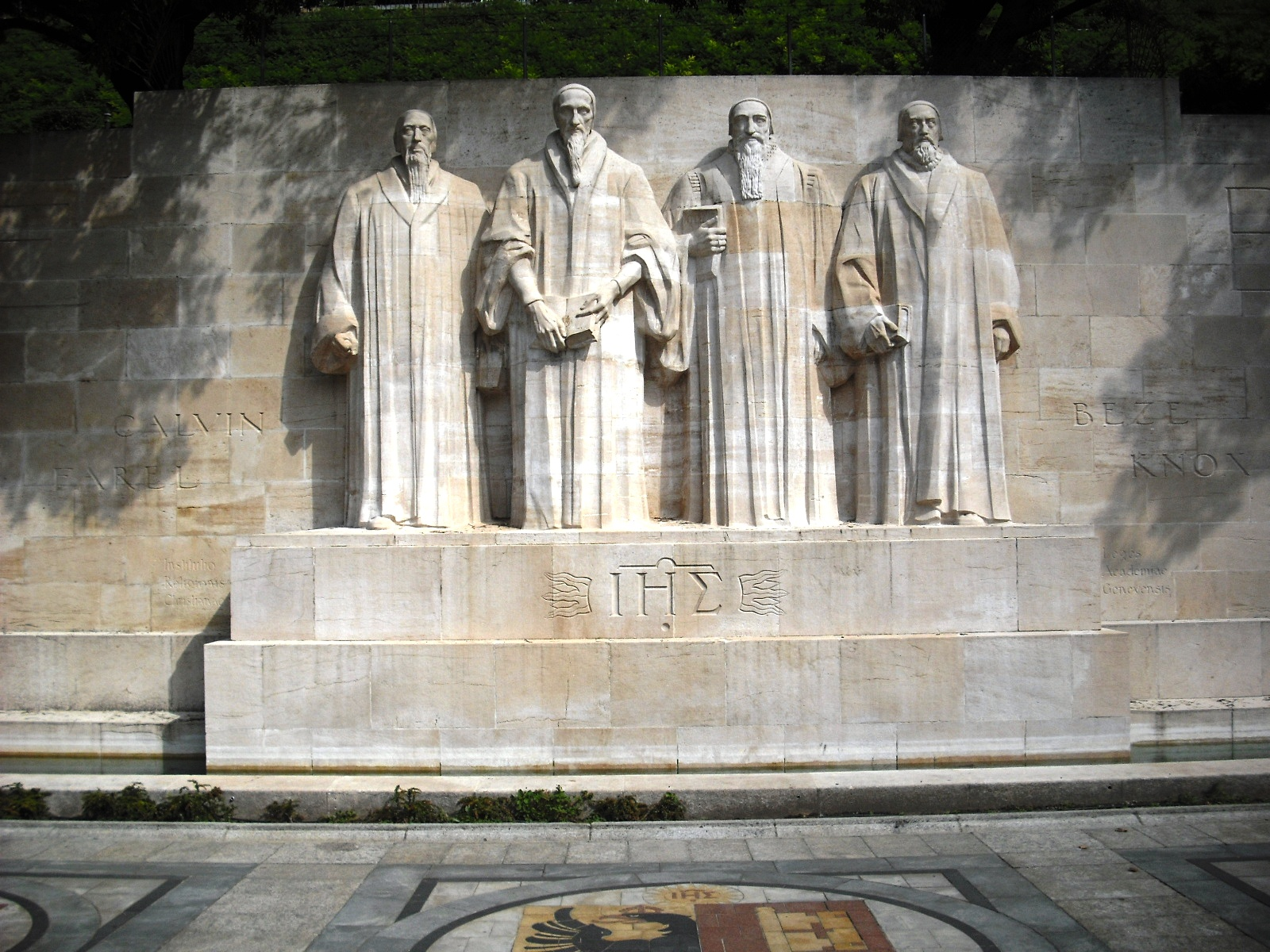
The International Monument to the Reformation

The Genevan Reformation was a religious and political reorientation of the city of Geneva, Switzerland from the Roman Catholic religion and the rule of a price-bishop allied with the House of Savoy to Protestantism and self-rule. Although allied with Lutheranism in its tentative early stages, the Reformation in Geneva culminated in the leadership of John Calvin and the adoption of Reformed theology, or Calvinism.

Under Calvin and the Genevan Consistory, Geneva became one of the great hubs of the Protestant Reformation. Known as the "Protestant Rome", Geneva attracted theology students and scholars from across Europe, many of whom returned to their homelands and further spread Reformed thought.

== Background to the Reformation in Geneva ==
The power of the Catholic Church in Geneva was weakened following an abortive rebellion in 1526 by the priests in protest of the alliance with Bern and Fribourg. In July 1527, all Catholic priests of noble descent were expelled from Geneva due to their pro-Savoy sentiments. The Savoyard Bishop of Geneva, Pierre de La Baume, fled the city to Gex in August 1527 to avoid capture or assassination by the agents of Charles III, Duke of Savoy, but still remained officially the bishop of Geneva. The bishop supported for a while the independence of Geneva, but later colluded with Charles III to use his influence to bring about the annulment of the 1526 treaty of alliance. As a result, the Grand Council decided in January 1528 to adhere to the Lutheran faith, and the Pope responded by excommunicating the people of Geneva. Even though Geneva was still under the nominal jurisdiction of a Catholic bishop, the Grand Council took advantage of his absence and initiated a gradual reform in worship along Lutheran lines.

Following the 1526 alliance treaty, Charles III was not willing to concede defeat in Geneva, and constantly plotted to take over that city again. The fear of Swiss intervention kept him at bay, but he encouraged sporadic acts of violence against Geneva such as acts of robbery and destruction of goods intended for Geneva. Bishop La Baume, no longer residing within that city, participated in plans to overthrow its independence. Some of the knights who were interested in capturing Geneva for Charles III organized in an unofficial organization termed the Order of the Spoon. The knights of that group attempted an abortive invasion of Geneva by climbing on the city wall with ladders on March 25, 1529, an event to be known as "day of the ladders". In addition, the Duke of Savoy sought to convince the other Swiss republics to abrogate their alliance with Geneva, and to that end managed to enlist the support of Francis I of France and of Emperor Charles V. The Emperor Charles V tried to convince the Grand Council of Geneva to return to the Catholic Church, and on July 16, 1529 even wrote a letter to that effect in his own handwriting, but the council of Geneva rejected the plea and Charles V became determined to act with force. The Swiss Federation was alarmed by these developments, and in May 1530 a joint delegation from Bern, Fribourg, Zurich, Basel and Solothurn suggested to the Grand Council the abrogation of the 1526 alliance treaty in exchange for looser cooperation. The Grand Council rejected the offer and decided to oppose any attempt to restore Geneva to Savoy rule.

On June 24, 1530, the Grand Council arrested a public prosecutor named Mandolia, who was a supporter of duke Charles III, and this irritated bishop La Baume, who retaliated by arresting Genevan merchants in Gex, where he now resided. He also made a pact with the Knights of the Spoon, and on August 20, issued an episcopal decree ordering them to wage war in order to restore Geneva to its rightful rulers. On September 30, the attack began, as the Knights of the Spoon were joined by the forces of Charles III, reaching up to 800 soldiers total. The Genevan army was only about 600 men strong, but on October 10 reinforcements of about 10,000 men strong arrived from Bern and Fribourg. In addition, Emperor Charles V, even though a supporter of Savoy interests, refused to participate in that war, and the invading army was forced to withdraw. Following the Savoyard withdrawal, a peace treaty was concluded between Geneva and bishop Baume, by which the Grand Council in Geneva released Mandolia from prison and the bishop released the Genevans arrested at Gex.

During the Second War of Kappel in October 1531, Geneva was politically divided, as the government of Bern requested military aid for the Protestants of Zurich, while Fribourg requested that for the Catholic party. The Grand Council of Geneva was torn between the two parties, but decided to split its forces and assist both simultaneously. Following the defeat of Zurich in the war, Fribourg renounced its alliance with Geneva. As a result, Charles III of Savoy renewed his plans of capturing Geneva. This alarmed the governments of Bern and Fribourg to the point of suggesting to Geneva to renounce the alliance treaty of 1526 and accept Savoy rule, which the council of Geneva rejected.

In June 1532, street skirmishes between Catholics and Protestants broke out, and the government of Fribourg threatened to tear up its alliance with Geneva if Protestant practices were permitted. The government of Bern, however, pressured the Grand Council of Geneva to allow Protestant preaching. The authority of the Catholic bishop was no longer recognized by the people and institutions of Geneva, but at first they refused to commit their city to the Protestant cause, for fear of antagonizing the Catholic rulers of adjacent kingdoms as well as the Catholic priests within Geneva.

== Compromise between Catholics and Protestants ==
The Catholic priests and monks in Geneva remained a significant social force to reckon with, and used their influence in order to bring about the expulsion of the Protestant preachers, and on March 28, 1533 even tried to incite the Catholic masses to massacre the Protestants - a scheme that failed due to emotions of city solidarity and Grand Council efforts to restore the peace. The Grand Council was cautious in its policies, and attempted a middle course between the two factions. As part of that middle course, it yielded to Protestant demands by approving in March 1533 the publication of the Bible in French, but only a conservative translation that did not appeal to Protestant sentiments and was acceptable to the Catholics in the republic. The Grand Council also had to take into consideration the need to remain in alliance with both Catholic and Protestant cantons. In February 1533, Fribourg openly revoked the alliance treaty of 1526, and later even made plans to invade Geneva.

In order to keep the peace between Catholics and Protestants as well as a policy of neutrality between the Catholic and Protestant powers, the Grand Council of Geneva on March 30, 1533 passed a statute of compromise which permitted every Genevan to choose his religious affiliation, while prohibiting open attacks on Catholic doctrines and practices and all religious preaching in open places for both parties. The first Protestant worship service was held on Good Friday of that year. Eating meat on Fridays was prohibited for both parties. However, neither had the intention of abiding by the statute, and street riots broke out from time to time.

A notable opponent of the early Reformation in Geneva was the Dominican friar Guy Furbity, a doctor of theology from the Sorbonne. Arriving in the city in December 1533 to preach during Advent, he launched fierce attacks against the evangelical preachers. His sermons provoked a response from Bern, which threatened to break its *combourgeoisie* (alliance) with Geneva unless Furbity retracted. Despite the interventions of the bishop, the Genevan authorities imprisoned him and arranged a public disputation with William Farel in January 1534. Furbity remained in prison until April 1536, when he was released at the request of King Francis I.

Even after the ousting of bishop La Baume from Geneva, the triumph of Protestantism was not assured, as the Catholic faction within that city conspired with Fribourg to act for the return of the Catholic bishop to Geneva. La Baume himself was reluctant at first, but Pope Clement VII pressured him to accept. On July 3, 1533 – with military aid from Fribourg – the bishop once again entered Geneva in a procession. The Grand Council demanded from the bishop to honor the traditional freedoms of the republic, which he promised to uphold. However, soon the bishop started arresting conspicuous Protestants in Geneva, and there were rumors that he intended to remove the prisoners to Fribourg and placed beyond the Grand Council's reach. On July 12 riots broke out, and the bishop yielded to popular clamor and delivered the prisoners to the Council's custody. Fearing for his life, the bishop fled the city once more on July 14, this time never to return, moving his headquarters to Arbois and later to Chambery. However, La Baume officially remained the bishop of Geneva and Catholic priests and monks still remained a strong faction within the city. La Baume still tried to exercise his jurisdiction over Geneva and on October 24, 1533 wrote a letter to the council, demanding it to stop Protestant preaching in Geneva, which the council refused to do.

== Protestant Triumph and Proclamation of the Republic ==
Following the bishop's flight, the influence of Protestant preachers in Geneva increased, and this was achieved to the chagrin of the local Catholic priests due to pressure from Bern, which threatened to revoke the 1526 alliance treaty unless freedom was granted to Protestants. In addition, the exiled bishop was gradually losing popularity also with the Catholic sections of Genevan society due to numerous attempts to meddle by proxy with the republic's judicial affairs, which the Genevans viewed as attacks on the liberties of their city. As a result of that, the Grand Council agreed in January 1534 to allow the trials of clergyman by secular authorities. The Catholic influence within Geneva was further diminished following the flight on July 30, 1534 of part of its Catholic population due to the rising tensions between Catholics and Protestants, and at the February 1535 election to the Grand Council, a Protestant majority was secured. Bishop de la Baume, seeing that Geneva was becoming Protestant, issued a decree on June 13, 1535 prohibiting trade with Geneva on pain of excommunication. The Grand Council, even though consisted of a Protestant majority, still refrained from proclaiming the city as Protestant, for fear of reprisals from Catholic neighboring kingdoms. In order to compel the council to make that move, Protestant leaders such as Guillaume Farel began agitating the crowds to demolish icons and throw the wafers of the eucharist to the ground in Catholic churches. As a measure of compromise between the two groups, the Grand Council resolved on August 10, 1535, to prohibit the breaking of icons on one hand and to prohibit the celebration of Mass on the other. This move increased further the flight of Catholics from the city into Savoy territories and on 1 October, bishop Pierre de La Baume fled the city for the last time.

Following another unsuccessful invasion of Geneva by Savoy forces in October 1535, which ended in a Savoy defeat at Gingins, the Grand Council decided on February 3, 1536 on the destruction of all castles around Geneva in order not to allow any princes another pretext for invading their city. On May 21, 1536, the Genevans declared themselves Protestant by taking a public oath of allegiance to the Lutheran faith where all residents took part, and proclaimed their city a republic. This move was in the making for a long time, but was delayed for fears of Savoy invasion. However, the French invasion of Savoy territories earlier that year had removed that obstacle.

== Calvin's Residency ==
The Protestant leader John Calvin arrived in Geneva in 1536, at the age of twenty-seven, and was based in Geneva from 1536 to his death in 1564 (save for an exile from 1538 to 1541). He became the spiritual leader of the city, a position created by the Grand Council as the city turned Protestant. Geneva became a center of Protestant activity, producing works such as the Genevan Psalter, though there were often tensions between Calvin and the city's civil authorities. Calvin also supported the admission into Geneva of Protestant refugees, which some circles strongly opposed.

In 1584, Geneva strengthened its ties to the Swiss Confederacy with a separate "eternal treaty" with the Protestant city cantons of Bern and Zürich. But the five Catholic cantons blocked any suggestions of full accession of Geneva to the Confederacy.

In 1559, Calvin founded the Academy of Geneva (now the University of Geneva) as a theological seminary, appointing as rector Theodore Beza, a French reformer who had arrived in Geneva in 1548. At the time, Beza was head of the Lausanne Academy. Once recruited to the rectorship, Beza encouraged professors at Lausanne to teach at the new Academy of Geneva. They were joined, after the St. Bartholomew's Day massacre in 1572, by distinguished Reformed humanist scholars such as Joseph Justus Scaliger and Isaac Casaubon.

== Counter Reformation ==
Though the city proper remained a Protestant stronghold, a large part of the historic diocese returned to Catholicism in the early seventeenth century under St. Francis de Sales. Geneva has played a historical role in the spread of Protestantism. In addition to becoming a Protestant state, Geneva in the 16th century also became a kind of welfare state, as a general state hospital was established in 1535 by the wealthy Protestant Claude Salomon. A centralized education system was established with the cooperation of John Calvin.

== See also ==
- Reformation in Switzerland
