= Company of Pastors =

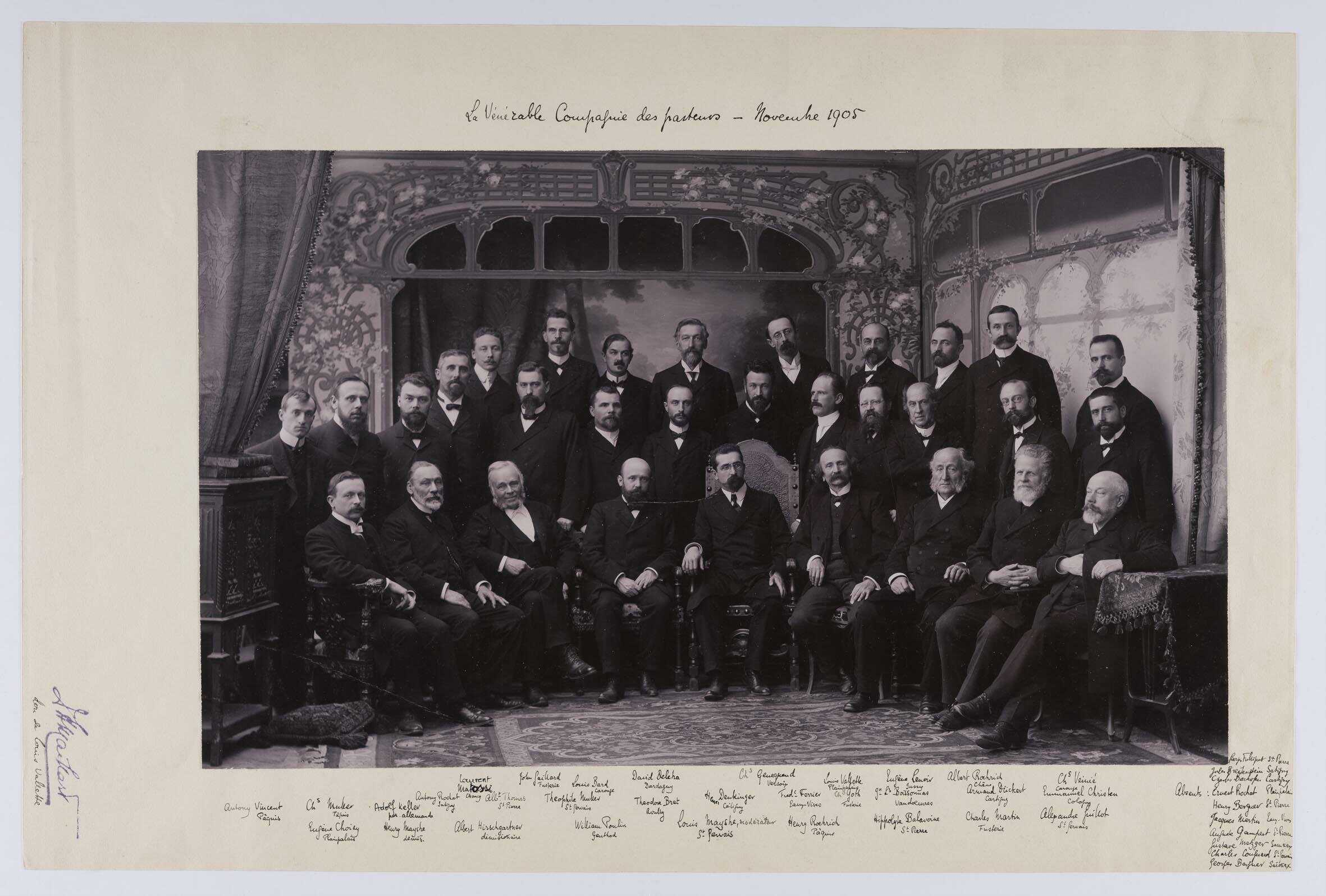
The Venerable Company of Pastors in 1905

The Company of Pastors or Venerable Company (French: Compagnie des pasteurs) is an organization, comparable to a classis, of ministers and deacons of the Protestant Church of Geneva. It was established as part of the implementation of John Calvin's Ecclesiastical Ordinances in 1541 and originally consisted of the ministers of Geneva's three city churches and a dozen countryside parishes. It met every Friday morning to examine candidates for ministry and discuss the theological and practical business of the church. In 1559 professors of the Genevan Academy were made members of the company. The company's powers were drastically reduced in the nineteenth century.
