= William Farel =

French reformer (1489–1565)

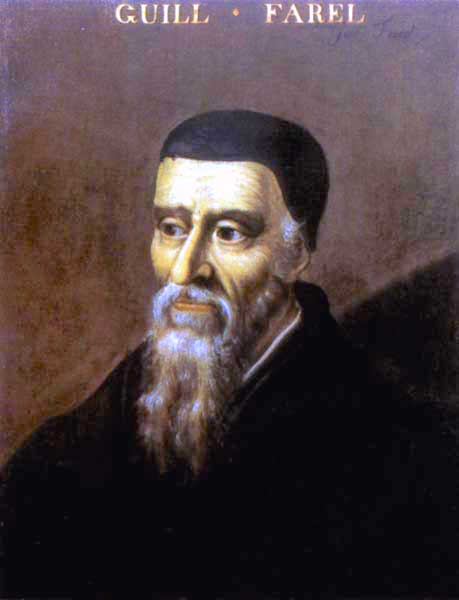
- 17th-century portrait by Hendrik Hondius I
- Born: 1489; Gap, Kingdom of France
- Died: 13 September 1565 (aged 75–76); Neuchâtel, Principality of Neuchâtel
- Occupations: Evangelist, theologian
- Theological work
- Language: French
- Tradition or movement: Reformation

William Farel (French: Guillaume Farel [ɡijom faʁɛl]; 1489 – 13 September 1565) was a French evangelist, Protestant reformer and a founder of the Reformed Church in French-speaking Switzerland. He is most often remembered for having persuaded John Calvin to remain in Geneva in 1536, and for persuading him to return there in 1541, after their expulsion in 1538. The Genevan Reformation was so profound that it became known as the "Protestant Rome", where Protestants took refuge and their opponents such as Catholics and unitarians were driven out. Together with Calvin, Farel worked to train missionary preachers who spread the Protestant cause to other countries, especially to France.

== Life ==
Farel was born in 1489 in Gap, in the French province of Dauphiné. He was the son of Antoine Farel, a papal notary, and Anastasie d'Orcières. Farel moved to Paris in 1509, where he studied with the pro-reform Catholic clergy at the University of Paris, in the earliest years of the Reformation. There he met the humanist scholar Jacques Lefevre d'Etaples, who influenced Farel and helped him obtain a professorship to teach grammar and philosophy at the Collège du Cardinal Lemoine. With Lefevre he became a member of the Cercle de Meaux gathered together from 1519 by the reform-minded bishop of Meaux, Guillaume Briçonnet. Farel soon became regent of the college. By 1522 he was appointed a diocesan preacher by the bishop. Farel now could invite a number of Evangelical humanists to work in his diocese to help implement his reform program within the Catholic Church.

This group of humanists also included Josse van Clichtove, Martial Mazurier, Gérard Roussel, and François Vatable. The members of the Meaux circle were of different talents but they generally emphasized the study of the Bible and a return to the theology of the early Church. While working with Lefevre in Meaux, Farel came under the influence of Lutheran ideas and became an avid promoter of them. After condemnation by the Sorbonne, Farel evangelized fervently in the Dauphiné. Although Farel later became a friend and ally of John Calvin, he had been a promoter of Lutheran ideas in his youth.

Farel was forced to flee to Switzerland because of controversy that was aroused by his writings against the use of images in Christian worship. In 1524, while in Basel, he wrote thirteen theses sharply criticizing Roman doctrine, but his argument was so heated that even Erasmus joined in the demand for his expulsion. He went on to Strasbourg and later Montbéliard, but was again forced to leave. Eventually he spent time in Zürich with Huldrych Zwingli, in Metz and back in Strasbourg, where he met Martin Bucer. Farel then travelled through Vaud, preaching the new faith in Aigle, Lausanne, Orbe, Grandson and Yverdon. Thanks to his efforts, the city of Neuchâtel adhered to the Reformation in 1530. In 1532, at the Synod of Chanforan in Piedmont, Farel took part in the discussions that led to the merger of the Waldensians with the Reformation.

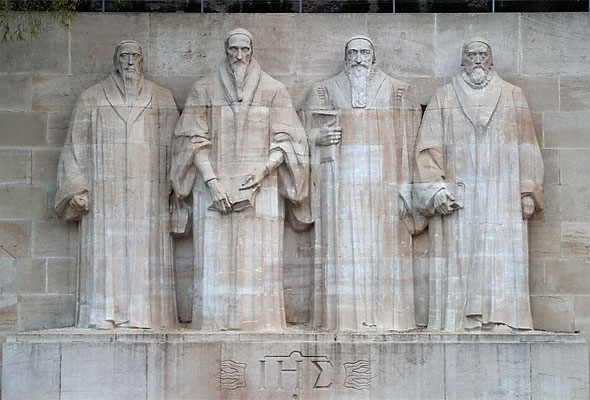
The Reformation Wall in Geneva. From left: Farel, John Calvin, Theodore Beza, and John Knox

Farel began preaching in Geneva in 1532 under the protection of the Protestant canton of Bern. In 1533 he was involved in a public debate with the French Dominican Guy Furbity

After an initial hostile reception, he gained an increasing number of followers, so that the General Council of Geneva adopted the Reformation in May 1536. Two months later, Farel convinced John Calvin, who was passing through Geneva, to stay in the city and participate in its evangelization. In October 1536, Farel led a delegation of pastors to the disputation of Lausanne, which sanctioned the conversion of Vaud (then occupied by the canton of Bern). However, Farel and Calvin soon came into conflict with the government of Republic of Geneva, over questions of the respective authority of the Church and the State. Farel, along with Calvin, was banished from Geneva in the Easter of 1538. He settled in Neuchâtel, where he would spend the rest of his life as the city's first pastor. Nevertheless, Farel often traveled to Switzerland, France and Germany, and was frequently consulted by Calvin.

In 1558, at the age of 69, Farel married Marie Thorel, the 18-year-old daughter of a Huguenot refugee. Scott Manetsch notes that Calvin was "flabbergasted and irate" at the marriage, "fearing that his friend's scandalous action would inflict irreparable damage on the cause of the Reformation throughout Europe", and refused to bless their union. The couple did have a son six years later, although he died in infancy. In the winter of 1565, when the Protestants of Metz begged him to come to their aid, Farel visited the city and preached with all his old fire. Exhausted by his travels through the winter, Farel died in Neuchâtel on 13 September 1565.

== Legacy ==
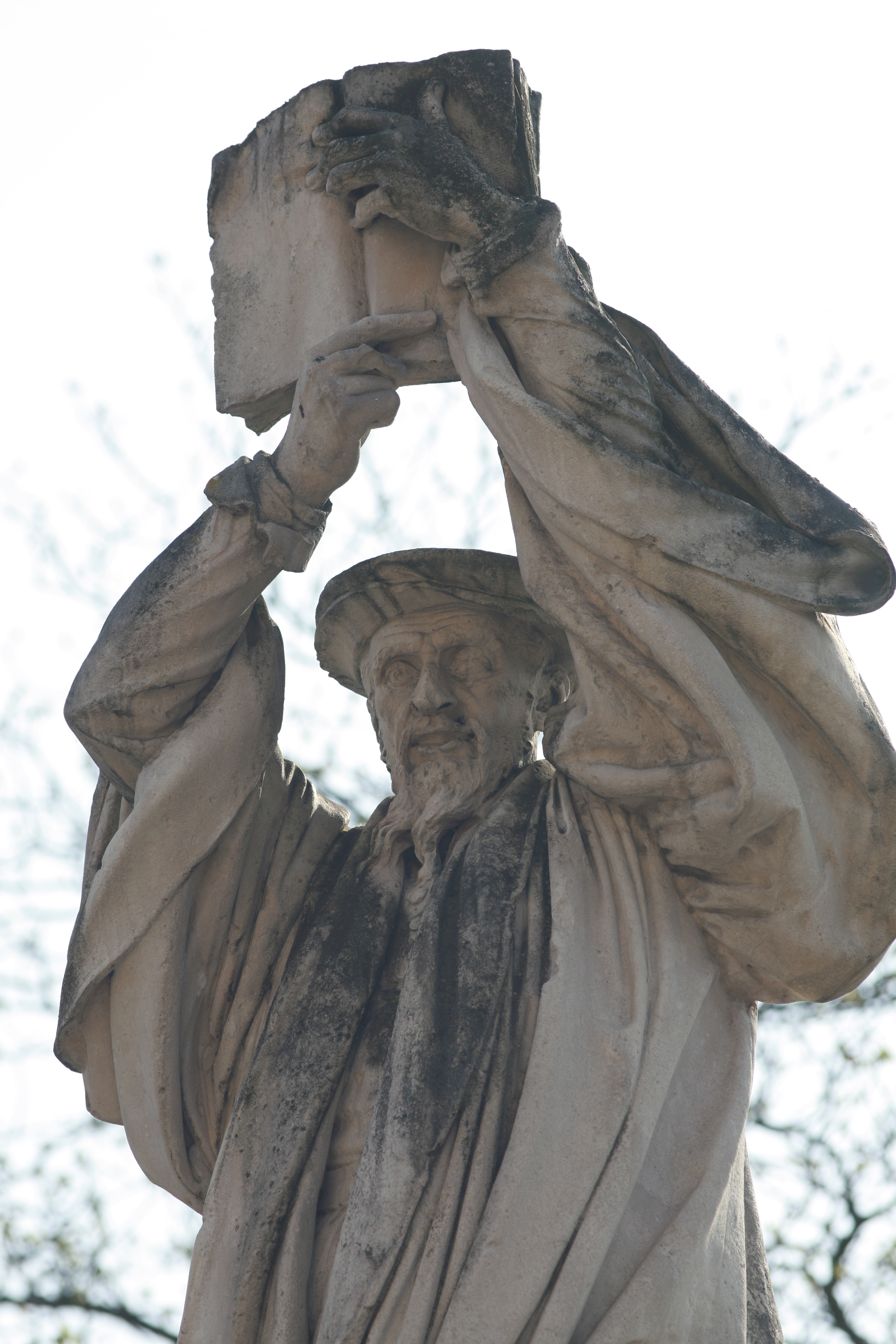
Statue of Farel in Neuchâtel

Martin Bucer described Farel, alongside Calvin and Pierre Viret, as part of the triumvirate of the Francophone Reformation. A pioneer of the movement, he was the first to preach the Reformation in Meaux, Basel, Metz, Strasbourg, Neuchâtel, Geneva and Lausanne, and was the one who invited both Calvin and Viret to the ministry. Like Luther, Farel was aware of the power of printing: in 1533, he installed the first fully Reformed printer, Pierre de Vingle, in Neuchâtel, and brought Jean Girard, who would become Calvin's printer, to Geneva in 1536. A monument to him was unveiled at Neuchâtel on 4 May 1876.

Farel published around fifteen works, all in French. Here again he was a pioneer: his works include the first French-language work of the Reformation (Le Pater noster et le Credo en françoys, 1524), the first systematic exposition of the Reformed doctrine in French (Summaire et briefve declaration..., 1529) and the first Reformed lithurgy in French (La maniere et fasson qu'on tient en baillant le sainct baptesme, c. 1528). As shown in his manuscript Jesus sur tout et rien sur lui (1530), Farel's doctrine was Christocentric; on the Last Supper, he emphasized, like Zwingli, the idea that the bread and wine signify the body and blood of the Lord.

== See also ==
- Reformation in Switzerland

== Sources ==
- González, Justo (1984), "John Calvin", The Story of Christianity, vol. 2, Peabody: Prince Press, ISBN 978-1-56563-522-7
- Gordon, Alexander (1911). "Farel, Guillaume" . In Chisholm, Hugh (ed.). Encyclopædia Britannica. Vol. 10 (11th ed.). Cambridge University Press. p. 176.
- Kingdon, Robert M (2003). "CALVIN, JOHN (1509–1564)" (PDF). In Hillerbrand, Hans (ed.). Encyclopedia of Protestantism. Routledge. Archived from the original (PDF) on 2004-12-28.
- Latourette, Kenneth; Winter, Ralph (1975), "The Rise of the Reformed and Presbyterian Churches", A History of Christianity, vol. 2, Peabody: Prince Press, ISBN 978-1-56563-329-2
- MacVicar, Donald (June 1955), "William Farel, Reformer of the Swiss Romand, His Life, His Writings and His Theology", Church History, 24 (2), Cambridge University Press: 175, doi:10.1017/3161654, ISSN 0009-6407, JSTOR 3161653
- Marshall, Peter (2007), "Leaving the World", in Matheson, Peter (ed.), Reformation Christianity, Fortress Press, ISBN 978-0-8006-3415-5

== Archive sources ==
Autograph, manuscript letters of William Farel sent to other reformers and received by him, are preserved in the "Archives de l'État de Neuchâtel".

- PAST, Fonds: Archives de la société des pasteurs et ministres neuchâtelois (13e-20e). Archives de l'État de Neuchâtel.
