= Genevan Consistory =

Protestant Church of Geneva council

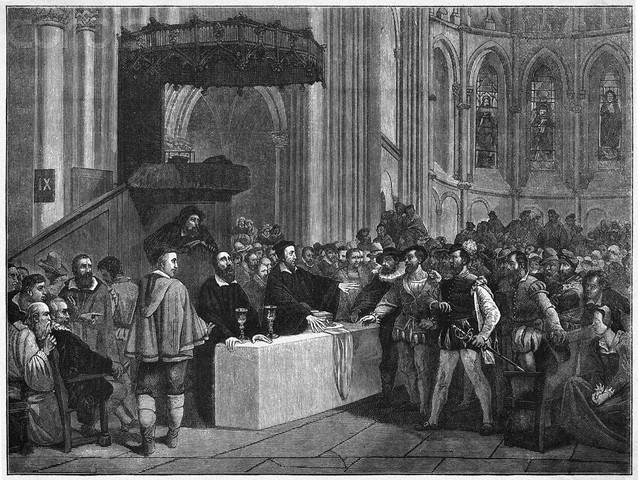
Calvin refuses communion to the libertines

The Genevan Consistory (French: Consistoire de Genève) is a council of the Protestant Church of Geneva similar to a synod in other Reformed churches. The Consistory was organized by John Calvin upon his return to Geneva in 1541 in order to integrate civic life and the church.

== History ==
The Consistory was first organized in November 1541 as part of the implementation of John Calvin's Ecclesiastical Ordinances, after Calvin's return to Geneva from Strasbourg in 1541 after a three-year exile. It initially consisted of the city's pastors and twelve lay elders who were selected from among the city's councils. The Consistory was to meet every Thursday and exercise church discipline by summoning and formally rebuking Genevans who had refused to repent when confronted by elders and pastors in private with issues of sin. These sins included adultery, illicit marriages, cursing, unauthorized luxury, dis-respectfulness in church, bearing traces to Roman Catholicism, blasphemy, or gambling, among others. If they remained obstinate, they were suspended from the Lord's Supper temporarily. The Genevan consistory, as well as that of Neuchâtel, struggled to maintain ecclesiastical independence unlike other Swiss consistories which were dominated by secular authorities. Calvin was emphatic that the church must retain the power of excommunication, a position known within Reformed churches as the "disciplinarist" view which was first articulated by Johannes Oecolampadius and Martin Bucer, whom Calvin learned from while banished from Geneva in Strasbourg. This was a consistent application of the two kingdoms doctrine, which is often associated with Martin Luther and Philip Melanchthon, but political realities prevented it from having much effect in the Lutheran territories. The opposing view in the Reformed churches is the "magistratical" model, advocated by Reformed leaders such as Wolfgang Musculus, Heinrich Bullinger, and Peter Martyr Vermigli, which is that secular authorities are responsible for the care of religion and should retain jurisdiction over ministers and the power to excommunicate.

In 1543, the Council of 60, a legislative body of the Republic of Geneva, ruled that the Consistory did not have the power to excommunicate, and that their only power was admonishment, but the Consistory continued to excommunicate about a dozen people per year. The Council ignored the Consistory's defiance until the ministers began to implement controversial reforms such as closing taverns, excommunicating prominent citizens for various sins, and assigning biblical names at baptism to children whose parents wished to name them with Saints' names. In 1553, the Council of 200, the upper legislature of Geneva, ruled that the Consistory did not have the right of excommunication. The issue was resolved in 1555 when Calvin's supporters gained control of the Council of 60. Calvin's opponents, the Perrinists, rioted in response and attempted to seize power, but the rebellion was quickly crushed. Many Perrinists were imprisoned or hanged, or fled, resulting in complete freedom for the Consistory to excommunicate.

From 1556 to 1569, about thirty-four people were summoned to the Consistory each week, and about three percent of the population was suspended from the table at some time. Suspensions declined after 1569 and the types of cases the Consistory dealt with shifted from correcting Catholic belief and ignorance of the new faith to moral control, a phenomenon common to other Reformed cities at this time as the Reformed sought to distinguish themselves from Catholic neighbors in terms of moral holiness. From 1570 to 1609 the civil authorities again began to intervene in the Consistory's affairs, insisting that they were being too harsh on minor offenders. In 1609, in a case involving a senator, the Small Council made clear that it had the authority to send cases to civil rather than ecclesiastical courts. The Council ignored another threat of intervention in 1609 and excommunicated two councilors, provoking the council to imprison a minister and decree that the excommunications were null and void, resulting in an end to the Consistory's monopoly over church censure. The eighteenth century saw a general decline in the stringency and power of Continental Reformed consistories. Genuflection before the Genevan consistory ceased in 1789, and the radical revolution of 1846 in Geneva temporarily put an end to the consistory, but it was reestablished with the administrative function it has today in 1849.

== Sources ==
- Watt, Jeffrey R., PDF The Consistory and Social Discipline in Geneva, University of Rochester Press. eBook, 2020, ISBN 978-1-64825-004-0
- Manetsch, Scott M. (2013). Calvin's Company of Pastors: Pastoral Care and the Emerging Reformed Church, 1536–1609. Oxford Studies in Historical Theology. New York: Oxford University Press.
