= St. Pierre Cathedral =

St. Peter's Cathedral of Geneva
- Cathédrale Saint-Pierre de Genève
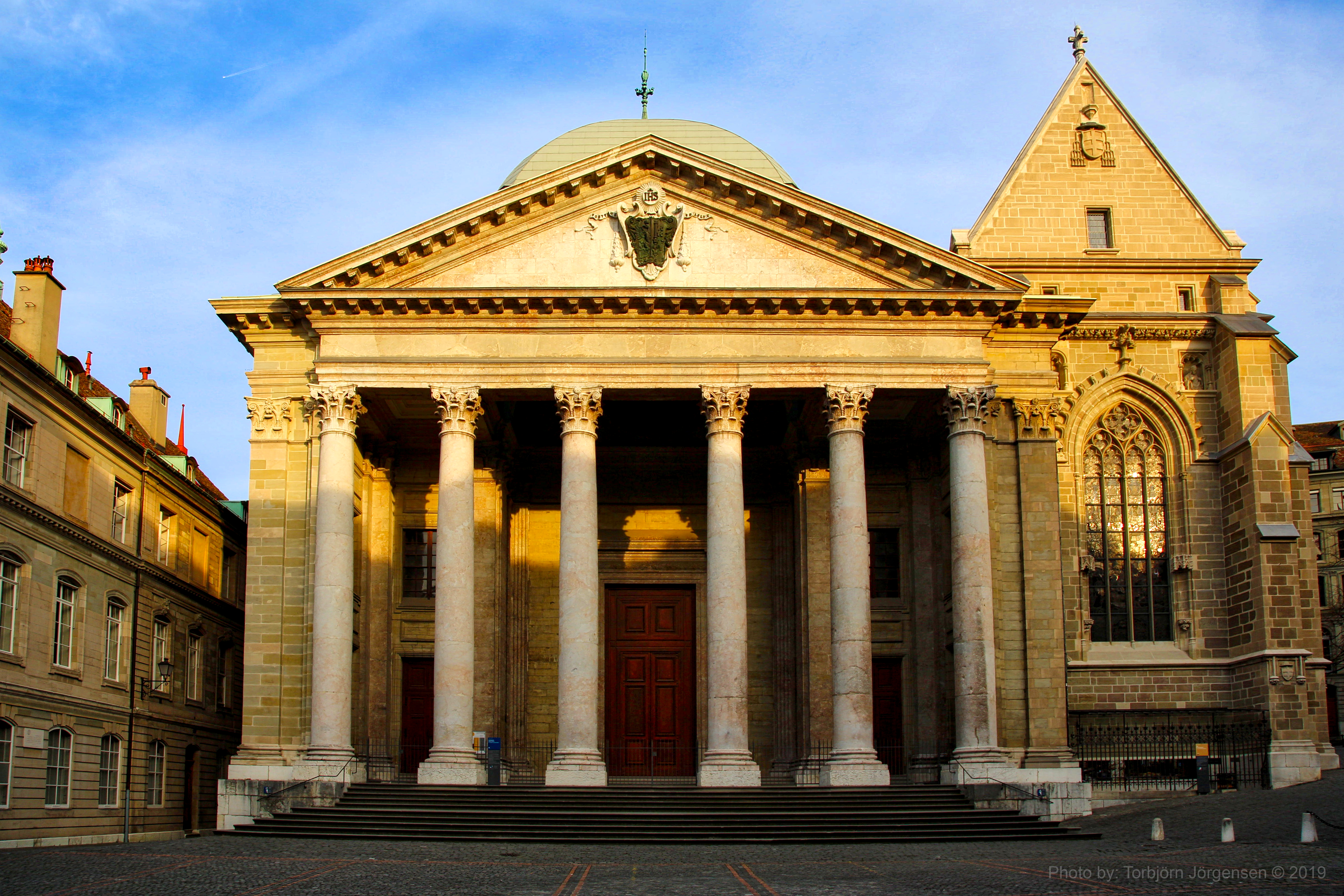
- St. Peter's Cathedral
- St. Peter's Cathedral of Geneva
- 46°12′4″N 6°8′55″E
- Location: Geneva
- Country: Switzerland
- Denomination: Protestant Church of Geneva
- Previous denomination: Roman Catholic
- Tradition: Calvinist
- Website: St. Pierre Cathedral

History
- Status: Parish church
- Founded: c. 380
- Dedication: Peter the Apostle
- Consecrated: 18 July 1288

Architecture
- Functional status: Active
- Heritage designation: Swiss Cultural Property of National Significance
- Years built: 1160-1288 (main structure); 1397-1405 (Chapel of the Maccabees); 1752-1756 (façade); 1897-1898 (new spire)
- Groundbreaking: c. 1160

Specifications
- Capacity: 1000
- Materials: Molasse Sandstone; Limestone

Swiss Cultural Property of National Significance
- Official name: Cathédrale Saint-Pierre et Chapelle des Macchabés, avec site archéologique et musée
- Reference no.: 02443

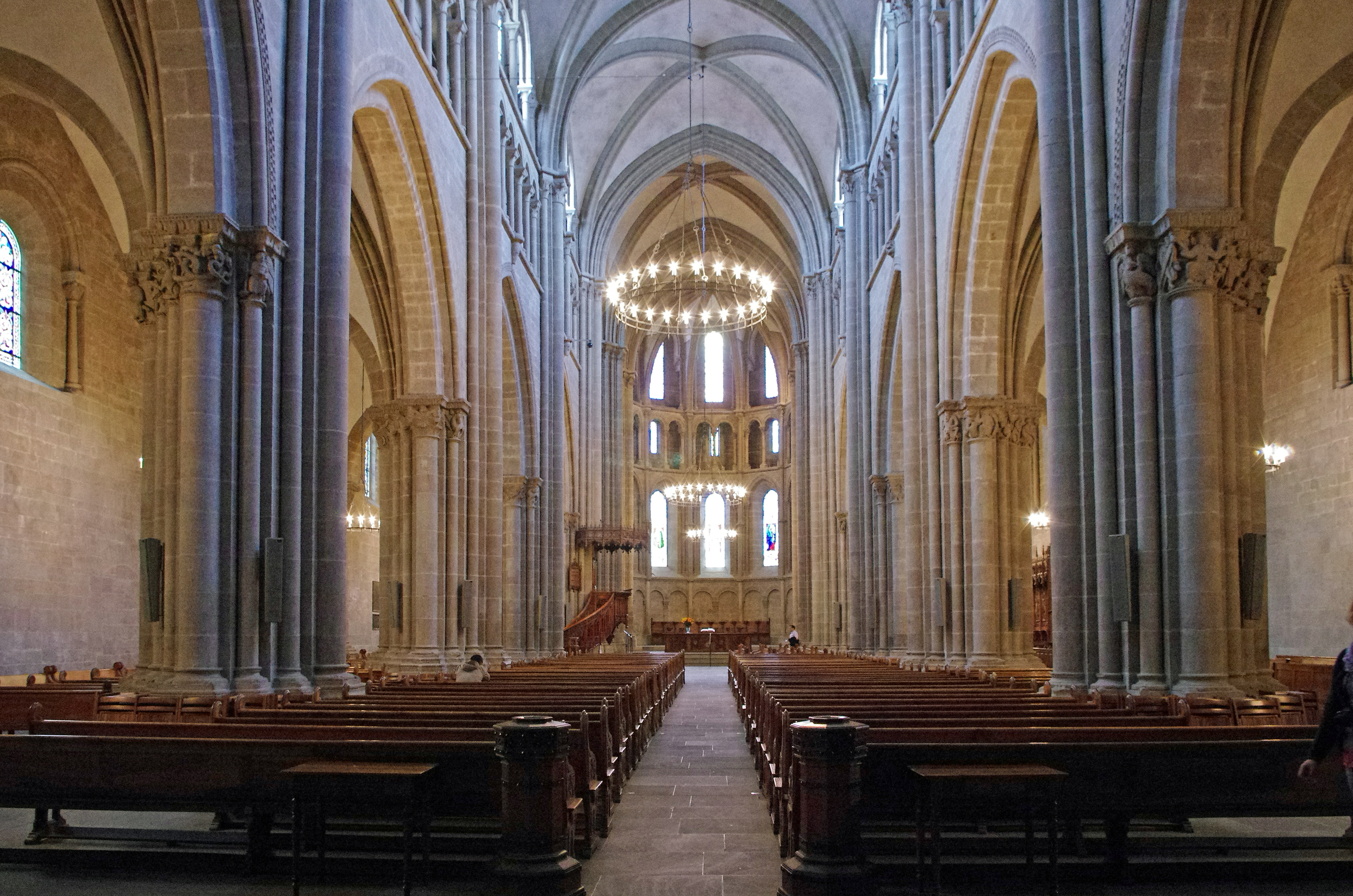
The nave of St. Pierre Cathedral

Saint Peter's Cathedral Geneva (French: Cathédrale Saint-Pierre de Genève, pronounced [sɛ̃ pjɛʁ də ʒənɛv] ) is a historic church in Geneva, Switzerland.

Since 1535, it has been the principal church of the Protestant Church of Geneva and a central site of the Protestant Reformation. It is closely associated with John Calvin, who preached there during his leadership of the Reformed movement.

== History ==
Below the cathedral is an accessible archaeological site that includes a 1st-century BC tomb of an ancient Allobrogian chieftain. An oppidum erected on the hill of Saint-Pierre allowed them to control the inland navigation on the Rhône. In the 4th century AD, Geneva became the seat of a bishopric. The first Christian edifice was built on the hill (between 350 and 375), on the ruins of the Roman sanctuary. This “northern cathedral” and a first baptistry were soon complemented by a southern cathedral, a second baptistry and an atrium.

After a fire struck the north cathedral in the year 500, King Sigismund of Burgundy rebuilt it and asked Pope Symmachus to bring him the relics of St Peter. The present building was begun under Arducius de Faucigny, the prince-bishop of the Diocese of Geneva, around 1160, in Gothic style. The interior of the cathedral is lined with fourth-century mosaics. The German painter Konrad Witz painted an altarpiece, the so-called St. Peter Altarpiece, for the cathedral in 1444, now in the Musée d'Art et d'Histoire, Geneva, which contains his composition, the Miraculous Draft of Fishes. The work is considered a key moment in European painting because Witz based the scene on a real view of Lake Geneva, making it the earliest known topographically accurate landscape in Western art.

At the time of the Reformation, the interior of the large, cruciform, late-gothic church was stripped of its rood screen, side chapels, and all decorative works of art, except the stained glass, leaving a vast, plain interior that contrasts sharply with the interior of surviving medieval churches that remain Roman Catholic. A Neo-Classical main façade was added in the 18th century. In the 1890s, Genevans redecorated a large, side chapel adjacent to the cathedral's main doors in a polychrome, Gothic Revival style.

Theodore Beza, French Calvinist Protestant theologian, reformer and scholar, and successor to John Calvin, was buried at St. Pierre in 1605.

== Present day ==
On Whit Saturday, 30 May 2020, after nearly 485 years a Catholic Mass was to be celebrated in the cathedral as a symbol of ecumenical hospitality. Because of COVID-19, the Catholic Mass was postponed and was celebrated on Saturday, 5 March 2022.

On certain nights of the full moon, the cathedral sponsors "The Nocturnes de St-Pierre", an opportunity to access the towers for a panoramic view of the surrounding countryside by moonlight.

== Music ==
=== Organs ===
Saint Peter's Cathedral in Geneva contains three pipe organs: the Metzler grand organ in the west gallery, a chancel organ built by Xavier Silbermann, and a chapel organ built by E.F. Walcker. The instruments span different eras and serve varied musical roles within the cathedral.

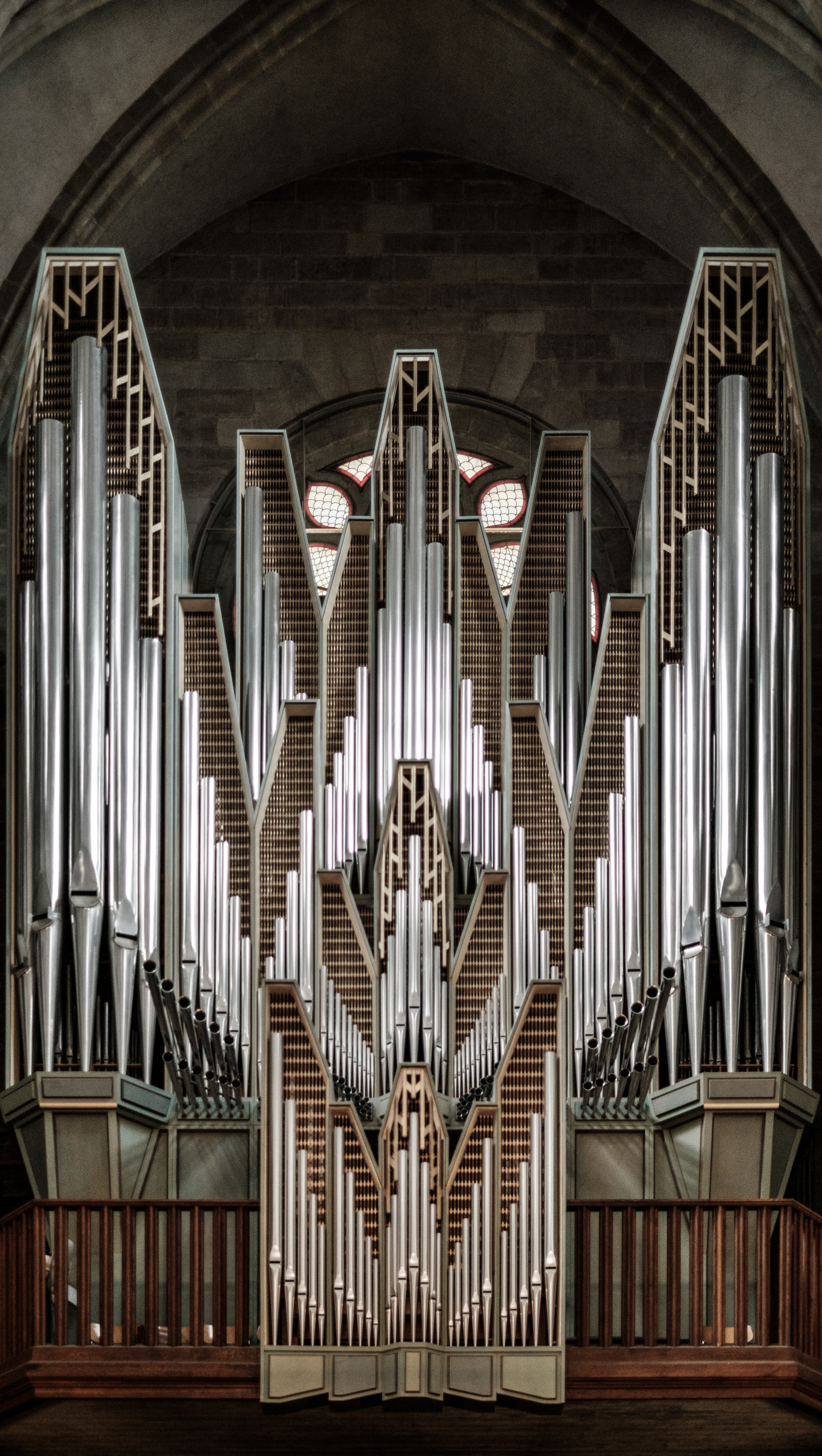
The Metzler Grand Organ

There has been an organ at the cathedral since at least the 16th century. The present Metzler grand organ is the fourth major instrument to serve in Saint Peter's Cathedral, following earlier gallery organs by Scherrer (1757), Merklin (1866), and the Geneva builder Tschanun (1907). The Metzler organ was built in 1965 by Metzler & Söhne, replacing the deteriorated Tschanun instrument (whose pneumatic action had aged poorly). The organ's large case was designed by Poul-Gerhard Andersen of Copenhagen. The Metzler instrument has four manuals (keyboards) and pedal, with a total of 67 stops (95 ranks).It features traditional mechanical key action and electric stop action. Its tonal design follows the late 17th-century North German organ tradition, complemented by a few French-inspired and Romantic stops. Metzler incorporated several ranks from the previous Merklin and Tschanun organs into the new instrument, thereby preserving some of the cathedral's historic pipework.The four divisions of the organ are arranged in a free-standing case that was carefully designed not to disrupt the architecture of the nave. Installation was delayed by structural improvements to the gallery, but the instrument was completed and inaugurated in November 1965. A comprehensive overhaul took place in 2003, during which the organ was dismantled, cleaned and regulated.

The chancel organ (choir organ) was constructed in 1972 by Xavier Silbermann of Thonon. Funded largely by the Cathedral Concerts Foundation, it provides a smaller liturgical instrument for use in the crossing and transepts. It has a single manual with divided stops and a mandatory pedal coupler, and is mounted on a movable platform. The organ was first used in October 1972 and formally inaugurated in January 1973.

The chapel organ is located in the Chapel of the Maccabees and is the oldest of the three instruments. It was built by the German firm Walcker and installed in 1888. The organ was a gift to the cathedral during a period of major restoration of the chapel's interior. Apart from the later addition of an electric blower (replacing the original hand-pumped bellows), the organ has survived essentially in its original 19th-century state. Housed in a tall neo-Gothic case designed to harmonise with the chapel interior, it has two manuals, mechanical action and cone-valve chests. The instrument is regarded as the oldest surviving mechanical-action organ in Geneva. A full restoration was carried out in 2021, retaining its original stoplist.

=== Bells ===
The cathedral's bells are divided between the north tower, the south tower and the central spire. The most prominent is La Clémence, cast in 1407 and named in reference to Antipope Clement VII, Robert of Geneva, whose influence extended to Geneva during the Western Schism through his legate, Cardinal Jean de Brogny. The bell retained its position in the life of the city through successive recastings. The present bourdon, made in 1902 by the foundry Rüetschi and weighing more than six tonnes, occupies the same role. The north tower also contains La Bellerive of 1473.

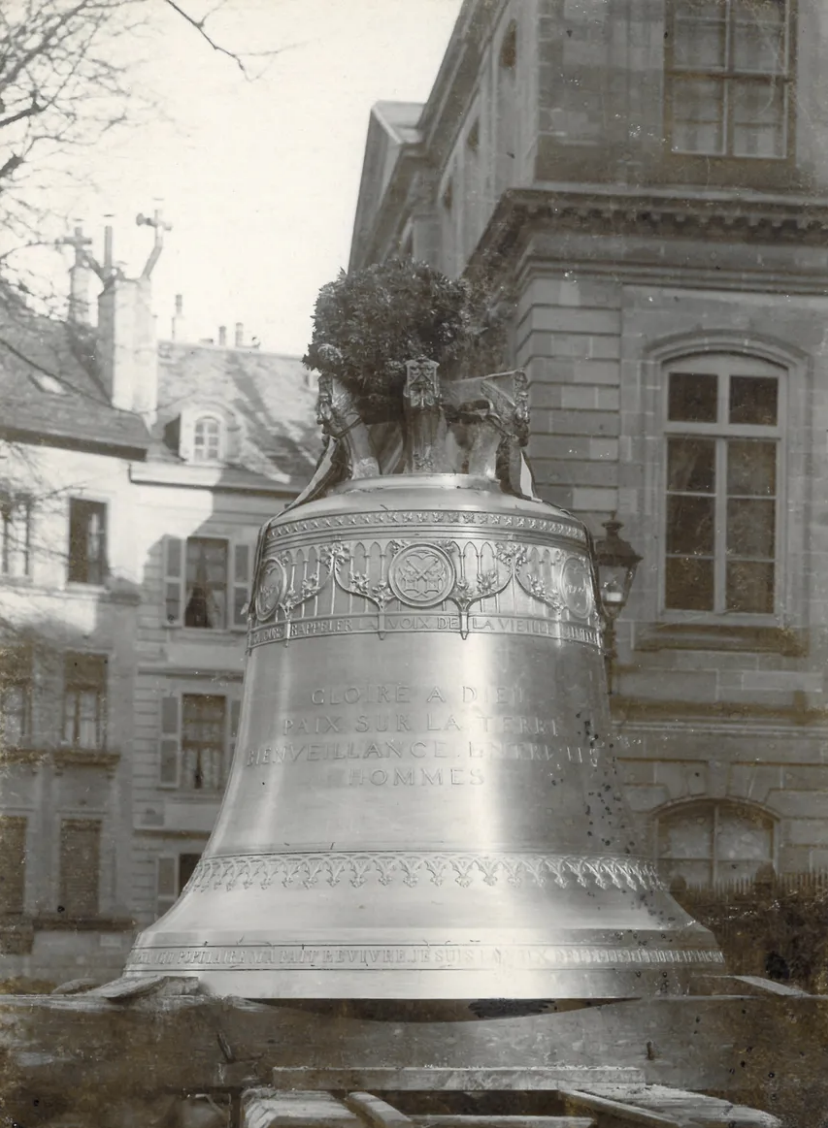
The bell La Clémence before hoisting in the Cour Saint-Pierre (November 1902)

The south tower carries a group whose earliest forms were produced in the late medieval and early modern period, later recast to maintain their established functions in the tower peal. These are L'Accord (1845), La Collavine (1609), L'Éveil (1845), Le Rappel (15th century) and L'Espérance (2002). Together they form the liturgical peal used on Saturday evenings and Sunday mornings.

The hour bell of 1460, now located in the spire, was lowered in pitch in 1898 so that it matched the other tower bells. It strikes the hours and is also connected to the carillon system.

The spire contains the cathedral's carillon. A first mechanism was installed in 1749, the present instrument was constructed in 1931 and enlarged in 2011. After the 2011 expansion, the carillon consists of thirty-seven fixed bells arranged over three octaves, including the 1460 hour bell. The carillon functions in two modes. An automatic mechanism governed by the cathedral clock plays short sequences at the quarter-hours and, on the hour, performs one of twelve melodies assigned to the months of the year.

No.	Name	Year	Caster	Diameter (mm)	Mass (kg)	Strike tone	Tower
1	La Clémence	1902	H. Rüetschi, Aarau	2190	6238	g^{0}	North
2	L'Accord	1845	S. Treboux, Vevey	1560	2080	c^{1}	South
3	La Bellerive	1473	Nicolas Guerci	1400	1500	e^{1}	North
4	La Collavine	1609		1140	1012	g^{1}	South
5	L'Espérance	2002	H. Rüetschi, Aarau	930	475	a^{1}	South
6	L'Eveil	1845	S. Treboux, Vevey	750	261	c^{2}	South
7	Le Rappel	15th century		590	133	e^{2}	South
I	La Cloche des Heures	1460		1290	1610	e^{1}	Spire
II	Le Tocsin	1509		760	270	cis^{2}	South

== Gallery ==
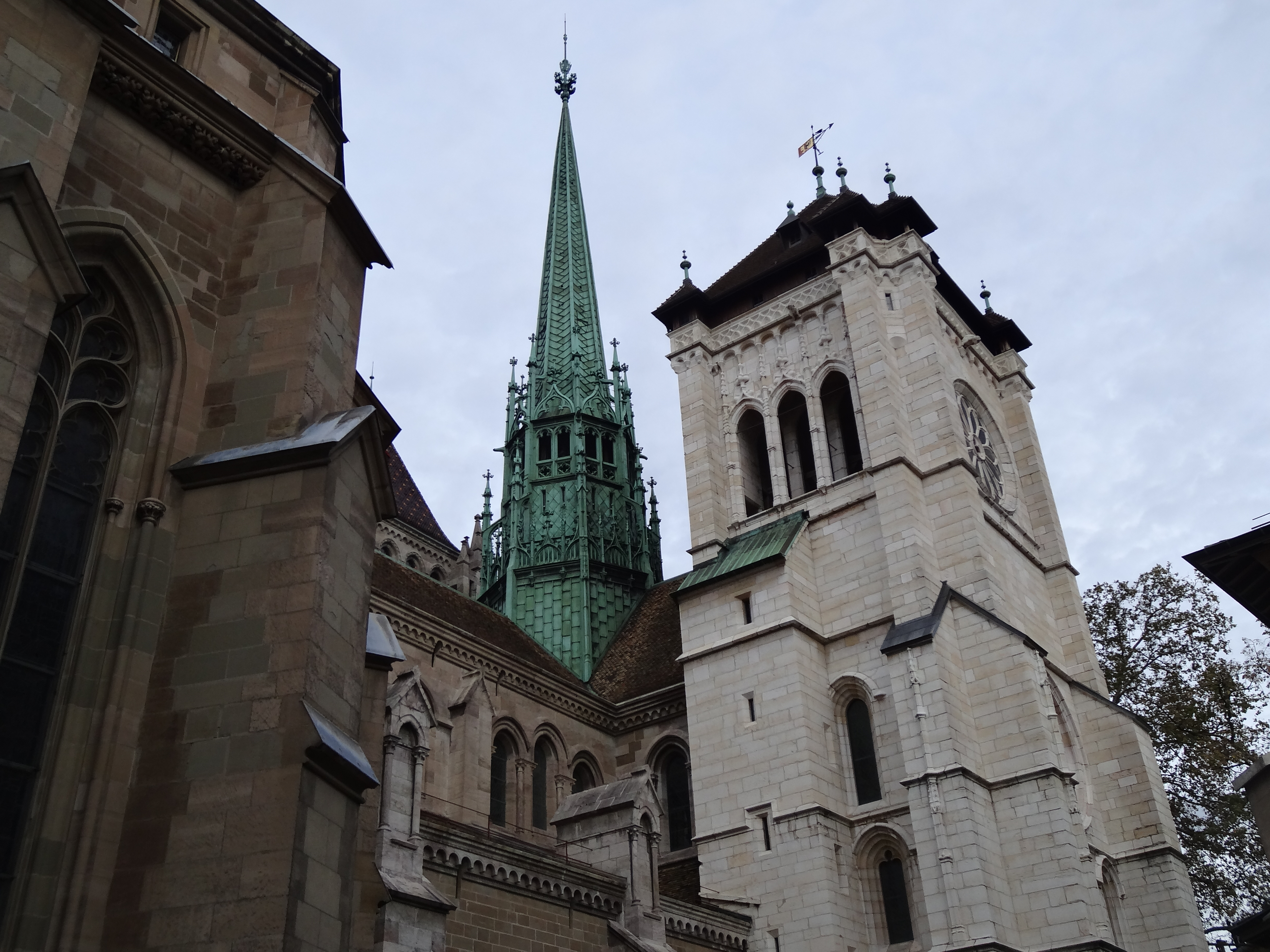
Spire of St. Pierre Cathedral

Front entrance of the Cathedral at night

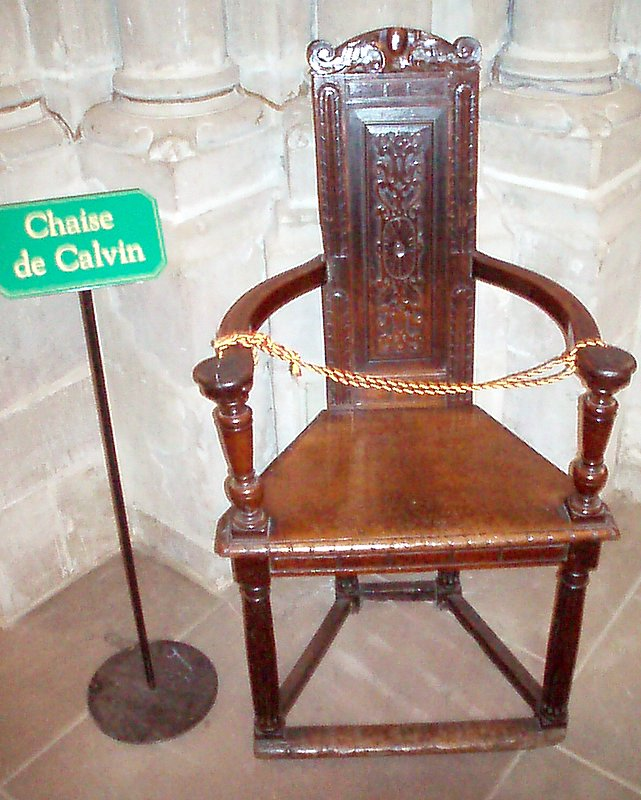
John Calvin's chair

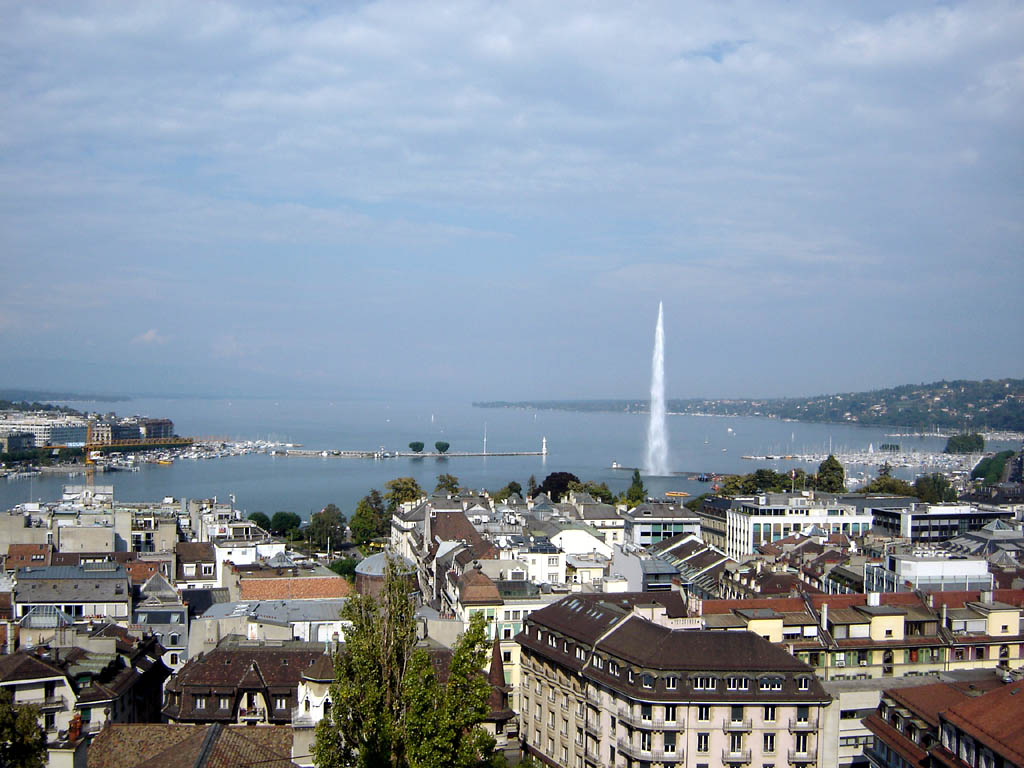
Jet d'Eau from the north tower of the Cathedral

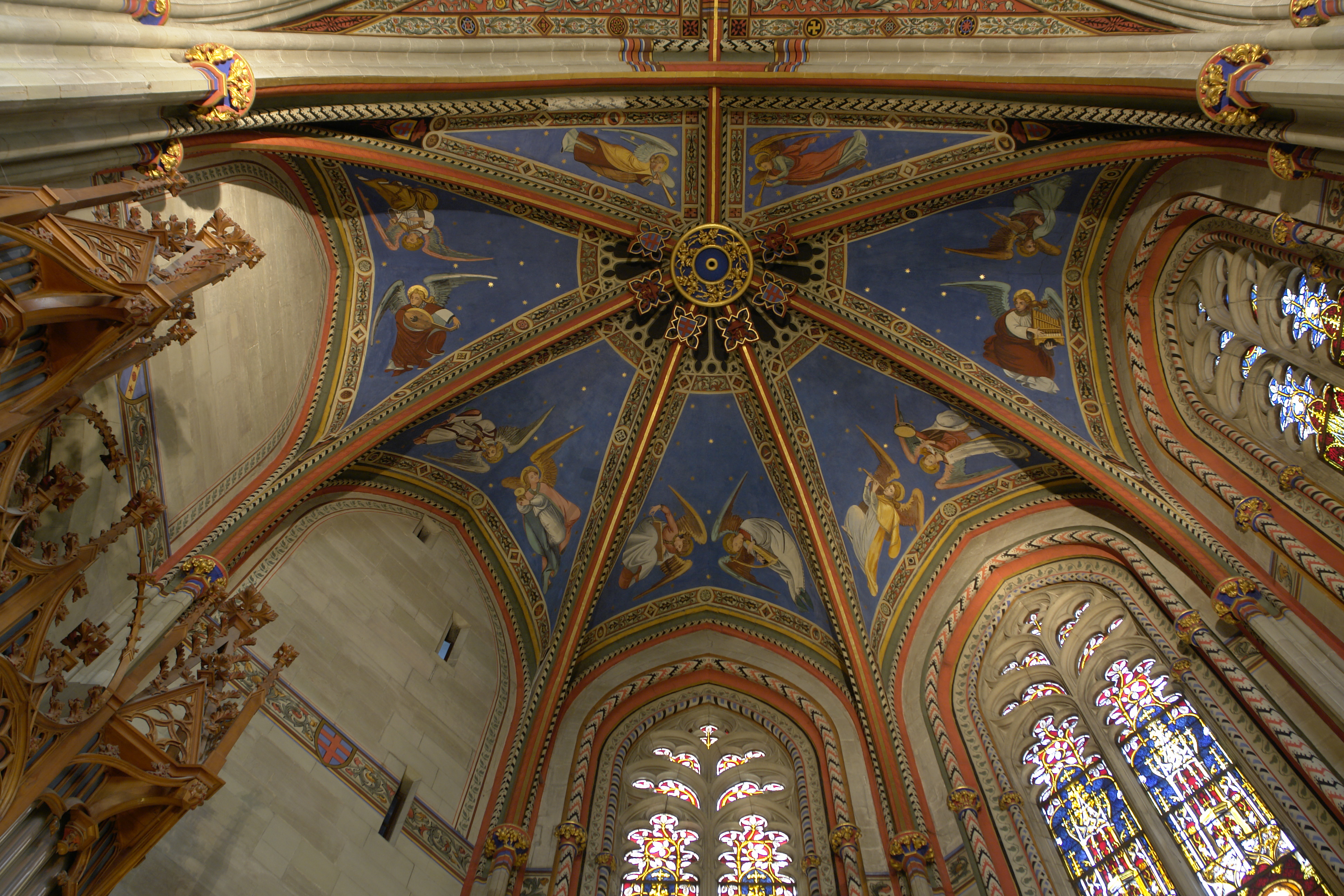
Ceiling of the Maccabees Chapel

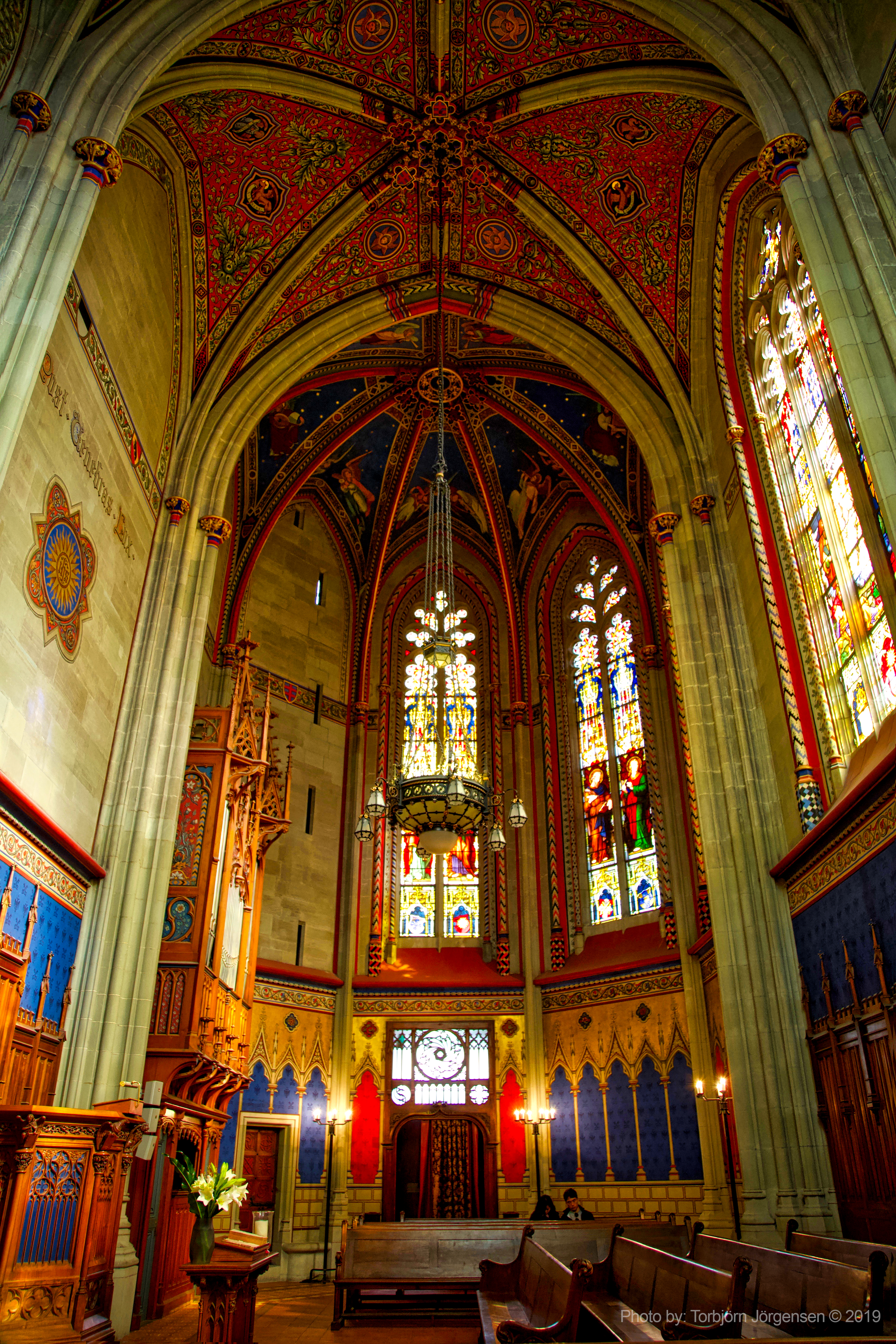
Chapelle of St. Pierre Cathedral

== See also ==
- List of carillons
