= Ecclesiastical Ordinances =

The Ecclesiastical Ordinances were the foundational laws introduced by John Calvin in Geneva in 1541 to organize the structure and discipline of the Reformed church. This had been requested by the Genevan authorities after he had been called back from exile, and were strongly influenced by his stay in Martin Bucer's Strasbourg. They defined four church ministries — pastors, doctors, elders, and deacons — and established the Company of Pastors and the Consistory to regulate doctrine, morality, and church governance in cooperation with the civil authorities in the city council.

Calvin insisted on the Ordinances being accepted as a condition of his return to Geneva. They were revised in 1561.

== Bibliography ==
- Kingdon, Robert M (2003). "CALVIN, JOHN (1509–1564)" (PDF). In Hillerbrand, Hans (ed.). Encyclopedia of Protestantism. Routledge. Archived from the original (PDF) on 2004-12-28.
- MacCulloch, Diarmaid (2009). A History of Christianity: The First Three Thousand Years. Allen Lane. ISBN 978-0-7139-9869-6.
- Schaff, Philip (1910). "105. The Venerable Company and the Consistory.". History of the Christian Church, Volume VIII: Modern Christianity. The Swiss Reformation. Charles Scribner's Sons.
