= Robert M. Kingdon =

- Born: December 29, 1927; Chicago, Illinois, US
- Died: December 3, 2010 (aged 82); Madison, Wisconsin, US
- Education: Oberlin College; Columbia University
- Occupations: Scholar, Author, Professor of History at Wisconsin
- Known for: The history of Calvinism, the French Reformation, and Christianity in Early Modern Europe
- Notable work: Geneva and the Coming of the Wars of Religion in France, 1555-1563, etc.

Robert M. Kingdon (December 29, 1927 – December 3, 2010) was an American historian of the Protestant Reformation.

"Bob" Kingdon was born in Chicago and spent many of his early years in Hawaii. He completed his undergraduate education at Oberlin College before moving on to Columbia University where he earned a doctorate under the noted Tudor historian Garrett Mattingly.

He taught at the University of Massachusetts Amherst and the University of Iowa before settling at the University of Wisconsin in 1965, where he would remain until his retirement.

Along with his path breaking works on the Reformation in Geneva and the spread of the Reformed tradition in France, Kingdon had an enormous influence on early modern studies through his efforts to found the Sixteenth Century Society and Conference and the Sixteenth Century Journal. During his tenure at Wisconsin, he ushered through a large cohort of graduate students in early modern studies, many of whom have become leading figures in the field.

== Works ==
- Geneva and the Coming of the Wars of Religion in France, 1555-1563. Geneva: Droz, 1956.
- Geneva and the Consolidation of the French Protestant Movement, 1564-1571. Geneva: Droz, 1967.
- Myths about the St. Bartholomew's Day Massacres, 1572-1576. Cambridge: Harvard University Press, 1988
- Adultery and Divorce in Calvin's Geneva. Cambridge: Harvard University Press, 1995
