= Reformed Christianity =

Protestant denominational family

Reformed Christianity, also called Calvinism, (Note: The name Calvinism derives from the French reformer John Calvin. Reformed Christianity can also be referred to as Reformed Protestantism, the Reformed tradition, or simply Reformed.) is a major branch of Protestantism that began during the 16th-century Reformation. In the modern day, it is largely represented by the Continental Reformed, Presbyterian, and Congregational traditions, as well as parts of the Anglican, Baptist and Waldensian traditions, in addition to a minority of people belonging to the Methodist faith (known as Calvinistic Methodists).

Reformed Christianity emphasizes the authority of the Bible and the sovereignty of God, as well as covenant theology, a framework for understanding the Bible based on God's covenants with people. Reformed churches emphasize simplicity in worship. Several forms of ecclesiastical polity are exercised by Reformed churches, including presbyterian, congregational, and some episcopal. Articulated by theologian John Calvin, the Reformed faith holds to a spiritual (pneumatic) presence of Christ in the Eucharist.

Emerging in the 16th century, the Reformed tradition developed over several generations, especially in areas of Switzerland, Scotland and the Netherlands. In the 17th century, Jacobus Arminius and the Remonstrants were expelled from the Dutch Reformed Church over disputes regarding predestination and salvation, and from that time Arminians are usually considered to be a distinct tradition from the Reformed. This dispute produced the Canons of Dort, the basis for the "doctrines of grace" also known as the "five points" of Calvinism.

Calvinism influenced social, economic, and political life by promoting hard work, trade, and wealth accumulation within ethical limits, laying the groundwork for modern capitalism, especially in Northern Europe and the United States. Its emphasis on elected church elders, the priesthood of all believers, and mixed government inspired early democratic practices, separation of powers, and protections for religious minorities, shaping colonies in North America and liberal political thought in England. Calvinist-inspired reforms also advanced social causes like abolition, women’s suffrage, education, and humanitarian efforts worldwide.

== Definition and terminology ==
The term Reformed Christianity is derived from the denomination's self designation of "Reformed Church", beginning in Switzerland and Germany, shortly thereafter followed by the Dutch Republic. Calvinism is the name derived from its most famous leader, John Calvin (born Jehan Cauvin), an influential Reformation-era theologian from Geneva, Switzerland. The term was first used by opposing Lutherans in the 1550s. Calvin did not approve of the use of this term, and religious scholars have argued its use is misleading, inaccurate, unhelpful, and "inherently distortive".

The definitions and boundaries of the terms Reformed Christianity and Calvinism are contested by scholars. As a historical movement, Reformed Christianity began during the Reformation with Huldrych Zwingli in Zürich, Switzerland. Following the failure of the Marburg Colloquy between Zwingli's followers and those of Martin Luther in 1529 to mediate disputes regarding the real presence of Christ in the Lord's Supper, Zwingli's followers were defined by their opposition to Lutherans (while Lutherans affirmed a corporeal presence of Christ in the Eucharist through a sacramental union, the Reformed came to hold a real spiritual presence of Christ in the Eucharist as propounded by Calvin and Bullinger). They also opposed Anabaptist radicals thus remaining within the Magisterial Reformation. During the 17th-century Arminian Controversy, followers of Jacobus Arminius were forcibly removed from the Dutch Reformed Church for their views regarding predestination and salvation, and thenceforth Arminians would be considered outside the pale of Reformed orthodoxy, though some use the term Reformed to include Arminians while using the term Calvinist to exclude Arminians.

Reformed Christianity has historically included Anglicanism, the branch of Christianity originating in the Church of England. The Anglican confessions are considered Reformed Protestant and leaders of the Protestant Reformation in England, such as the guiding Reformer who shaped Anglican theology Thomas Cranmer, were influenced by and counted among Reformed (Calvinist) theologians. As with Lutheranism, the Church of England retained elements of Catholicism such as bishops and vestments, thus sometimes being called "but halfly Reformed" or a middle way between Lutheranism and Reformed Christianity, being closer liturgically to the former and theologically aligned with the latter. Beginning in the 17th century, Anglicanism broadened to the extent that Reformed theology is no longer the sole dominant theology of Anglicanism.

Some scholars argue that the Particular Baptist (Reformed Baptist) strand of the Baptist tradition, who hold many of the same beliefs as Reformed Christians but not infant baptism, as expressed in the Second London Confession of Faith of 1689, should be considered part of Reformed Christianity, though this might not have been the view of early Reformed theologians. Others disagree, asserting that any type of Baptist should be considered separate from the Reformed branch of Christianity.

== History ==
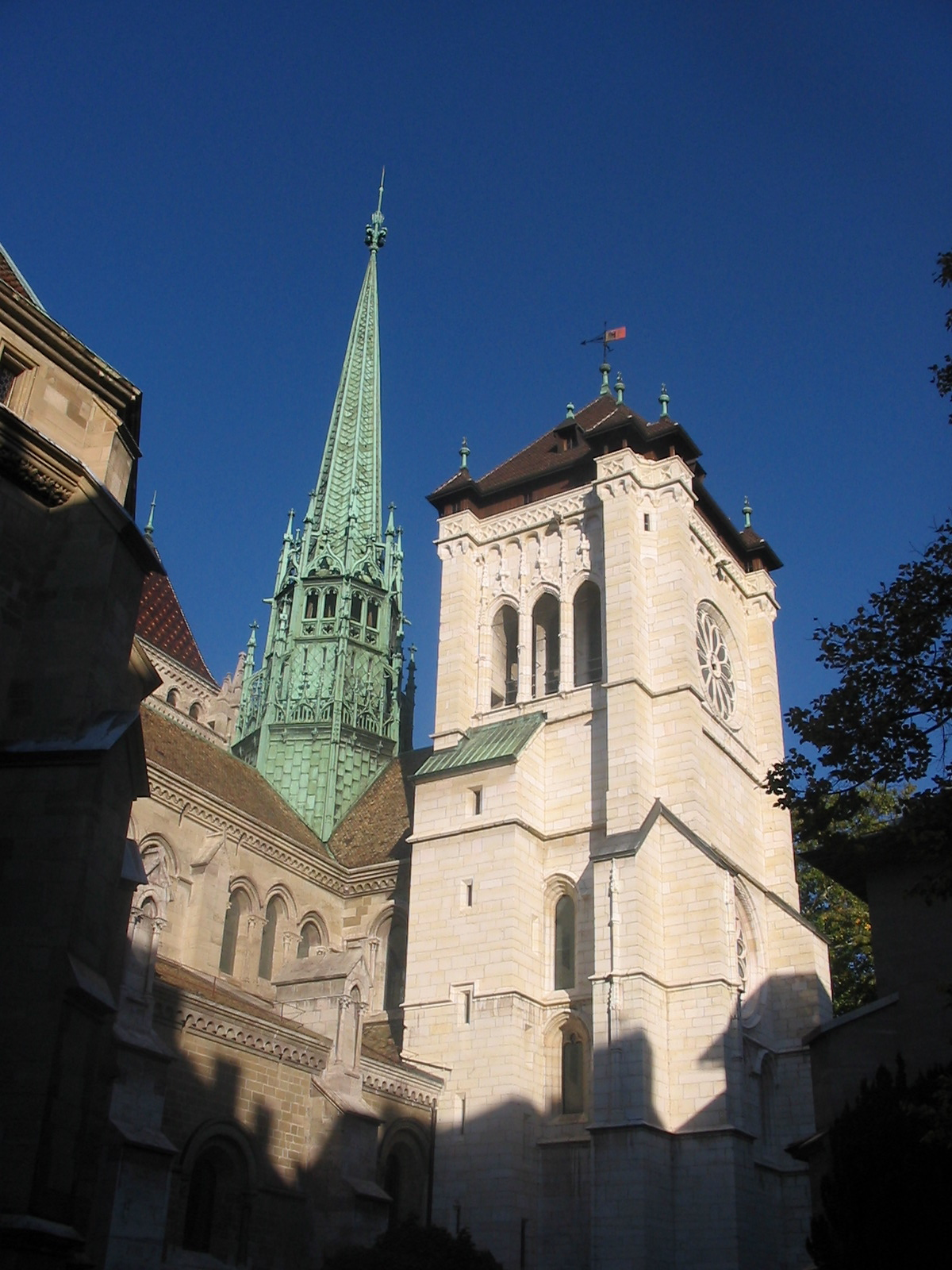
Calvin preached at St. Pierre Cathedral in Geneva.

The first wave of Reformed theologians included Huldrych Zwingli, Martin Bucer, Wolfgang Capito, John Oecolampadius, and Guillaume Farel. While from diverse academic backgrounds, their work already contained key themes within Reformed theology, especially the priority of scripture as a source of authority. Scripture was also viewed as a unified whole, which led to a covenantal theology of the sacraments of baptism and the Lord's Supper as visible signs of the covenant of grace. Another shared perspective was their denial of the real presence of Christ in the Eucharist. Each understood salvation to be by grace alone and affirmed a doctrine of unconditional election, the teaching that some people are chosen by God to be saved. Luther and his successor Philipp Melanchthon were significant influences on these theologians and, to a larger extent, those who followed. The doctrine of justification by faith alone, also known as sola fide, was a direct inheritance from Luther.

The second generation featured John Calvin, Heinrich Bullinger, Thomas Cranmer, Wolfgang Musculus, Peter Martyr Vermigli, Andreas Hyperius and John à Lasco. Written between 1536 and 1539, Calvin's Institutes of the Christian Religion was one of the most influential works of the era. Toward the middle of the 16th century, these beliefs were formed into one consistent creed which would shape the future definition of the Reformed faith. The 1549 Consensus Tigurinus unified Zwingli and Bullinger's memorialist theology of the Eucharist, which taught that it was simply a reminder of Christ's death, with Calvin's view of it as a means of grace with Christ actually present, though spiritually rather than bodily as in Catholic doctrine. The document demonstrates the diversity as well as unity in early Reformed theology, giving it a stability that enabled it to spread rapidly throughout Europe. This stands in marked contrast to the bitter controversy experienced by Lutherans prior to the 1579 Formula of Concord.

Through Calvin's missionary work in France, his program of reform eventually reached the French-speaking provinces of the Netherlands. Calvinism was adopted in the Electorate of the Palatinate under Frederick III, which led to the formulation of the Heidelberg Catechism in 1563. This and the Belgic Confession were adopted as confessional standards in the first synod of the Dutch Reformed Church in 1571.

In 1573, William the Silent joined the Calvinist Church. Calvinism was declared the official religion of the Kingdom of Navarre by the queen regnant Jeanne d'Albret after her conversion in 1560. Leading divines, either Calvinist or those sympathetic to Calvinism, settled in England, including Bucer, Martyr, and John Łaski, as did John Knox in Scotland. During the First English Civil War, English and Scots Presbyterians produced the Westminster Confession, which became the confessional standard for Presbyterians in the English-speaking world. Having established itself in Europe, the movement continued to spread to areas including North America, South Africa and Korea. While Calvin did not live to see the foundation of his work grow into an international movement, his death allowed his ideas to spread far beyond their city of origin and their borders and to establish their own distinct character.

=== Spread ===
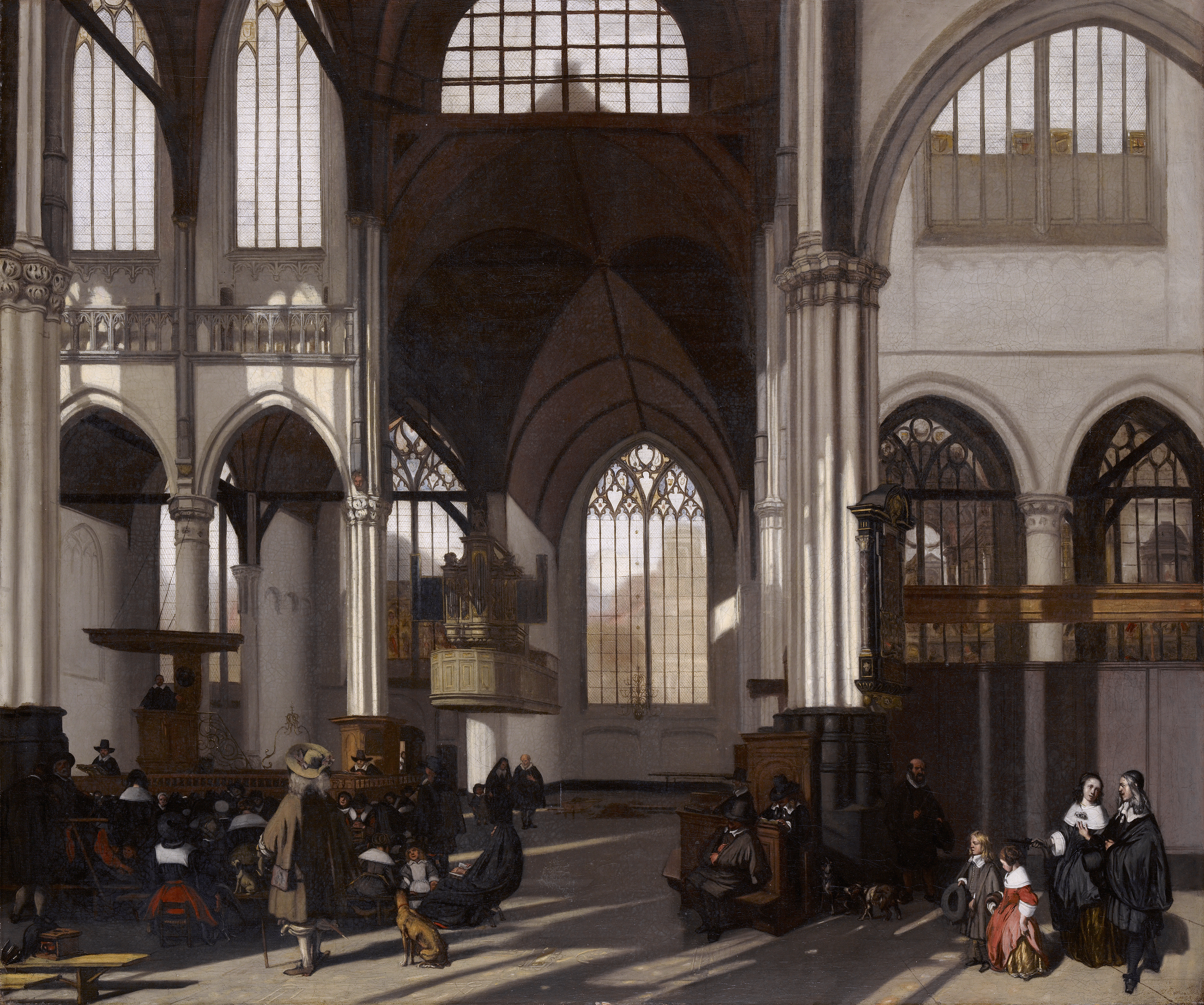
Early Calvinism was known for simple, unadorned churches as depicted in this 1661 portrait of the interior of the Oude Kerk, Amsterdam.

Although much of Calvin's work was in Geneva, his publications spread his ideas of a correctly Reformed church to many parts of Europe. In Switzerland, some cantons are still Reformed, and some are Catholic. Calvinism became the dominant doctrine within the Church of Scotland (Presbyterian Church), the Dutch Republic and parts of Germany, especially those adjacent to the Netherlands in the Palatinate, Kassel, and Lippe, spread by Caspar Olevian and Zacharias Ursinus among others. Protected by the local nobility, Calvinism became a significant religion in eastern Hungary and Hungarian-speaking areas of Transylvania. As of 2007, there are about 3.5 million Hungarian Reformed people worldwide.

Calvinism was also initially spreading in Flanders, Wallonia, France, Lithuania, and Poland before being mostly erased during the Counter-Reformation. One of the most important Polish reformed theologists was Łaski, who was also involved into organising churches in East Frisia and Stranger's Church in London. Later, a faction called the Polish Brethren broke away from Calvinism on January 22, 1556, when Piotr of Goniądz, a Polish student, spoke out against the doctrine of the Trinity during the general synod of the Reformed churches of Poland held in the village of Secemin. Calvinism gained some popularity in Scandinavia, especially Sweden, but was rejected in favor of Lutheranism after the Synod of Uppsala in 1593.

Many 17th century European settlers in the Thirteen Colonies in British America were Calvinists, who emigrated because of arguments over church structure, including the Pilgrim Fathers. Others were forced into exile, including the French Huguenots. Dutch and French Calvinist settlers were also among the first European colonizers of South Africa, beginning in the 17th century, who became known as Boers or Afrikaners.

Sierra Leone was largely colonized by Calvinist settlers from Nova Scotia, many of whom were Black Loyalists who fought for the British Empire during the American War of Independence. John Marrant had organized a congregation there under the auspices of the Huntingdon Connection. Some of the largest Calvinist communions were started by 19th- and 20th-century missionaries. Especially large are those in Indonesia, Korea and Nigeria. In South Korea there are 20,000 Presbyterian congregations with about 9–10 million church members, scattered in more than 100 Presbyterian denominations. In South Korea, Presbyterianism is the largest Christian denomination.

== Demography ==
A 2011 report of the Pew Forum on Religious and Public Life estimates that members of Presbyterian or Reformed churches make up 7% of the estimated 801 million Protestants globally, or approximately 56 million people.

Though the broadly defined Reformed faith is much larger, as it constitutes Congregationalist (0.5%), most of the United and uniting churches (unions of different denominations) (7.2%) and most likely some of the other Protestant denominations (38.2%). All three are distinct categories from Presbyterian or Reformed (7%) in this report. The Reformed family of churches is one of the largest Christian denominations, representing 75 million believers worldwide.

According to Global Christianity: A Guide to the World's Largest Religion from Afghanistan to Zimbabwe, in 2020, Presbyterian and Reformed Christians numbered around 65,446,000 people, or 0.8% of the world's population. Congregationalists were listed at 4,986,000, with 0.1% of the world's population. Therefore, the three branches of Reformed Christianity totaled 70,432,000 people, or 0.9% of the global population.

The survey also listed 77,792,000 members (1% of the world's population) in united churches, the majority of which are formed by the merger of churches of the Reformed Tradition with churches of other branches of Protestantism.

== World communions ==
The World Communion of Reformed Churches (WCRC), which includes some United Churches, has 80 million believers. WCRC is the fourth largest Christian communion in the world, after the Roman Catholic Church, the Eastern Orthodox Church, and the Anglican Communion. Many conservative Reformed churches which are strongly Calvinistic formed the World Reformed Fellowship which has about 70 member denominations. Most are not part of the WCRC because of its ecumenical attire. The International Conference of Reformed Churches is another conservative association.

== Theology ==
=== Revelation and scripture ===
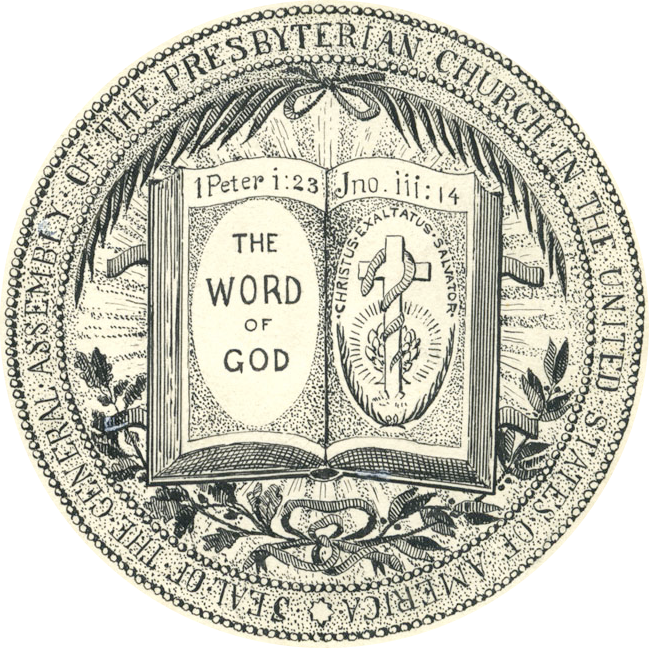
The seal of the Presbyterian Church in the United States of America, an early American Presbyterian church founded in 1789

Reformed theologians believe that God communicates knowledge of himself to people through the Word of God. People are not able to know anything about God except through this self-revelation. (With the exception of general revelation of God; "His invisible attributes, His eternal power and divine nature, have been clearly seen, being understood through what has been made, so that they are without excuse" (Romans 1:20).) Speculation about anything which God has not revealed through his Word is not warranted. The knowledge people have of God is different from that which they have of anything else because God is infinite, and finite people are incapable of comprehending an infinite being. While the knowledge revealed by God to people is never incorrect, it is also never comprehensive.

According to Reformed theologians, God's self-revelation is always through his son Jesus Christ, because Christ is the only mediator between God and people. Revelation of God through Christ comes through two basic channels. The first is creation and providence, which is God's creating and continuing to work in the world. This action of God gives everyone knowledge about God, but this knowledge is only sufficient to make people culpable for their sin; it does not include knowledge of the gospel. The second channel through which God reveals himself is redemption, which is the gospel of salvation from condemnation which is punishment for sin.

In Reformed theology, the Word of God takes several forms. Jesus Christ is the Word Incarnate. The prophecies about him said to be found in the Old Testament and the ministry of the apostles who saw him and communicated his message are also the Word of God. Further, the preaching of ministers about God is the very Word of God because God is considered to be speaking through them. God also speaks through human writers in the Bible, which is composed of texts set apart by God for self-revelation. Reformed theologians emphasize the Bible as a uniquely important means by which God communicates with people. People gain knowledge of God from the Bible which cannot be gained in any other way.

Reformed theologians affirm that the Bible is true, but differences emerge among them over the meaning and extent of its truthfulness. Conservative followers of the Princeton theologians take the view that the Bible is true and inerrant, or incapable of error or falsehood, in every place. This view is similar to that of Catholic orthodoxy as well as modern Evangelicalism. Another view, influenced by the teaching of Karl Barth and neo-orthodoxy, is found in the Presbyterian Church (U.S.A.)'s Confession of 1967. Those who take this view believe the Bible to be the primary source of our knowledge of God, but also that some parts of the Bible may be false, not witnesses to Christ, and not normative for the church. In this view, Christ is the revelation of God, and the scriptures witness to this revelation rather than being the revelation itself.

=== Covenant theology ===
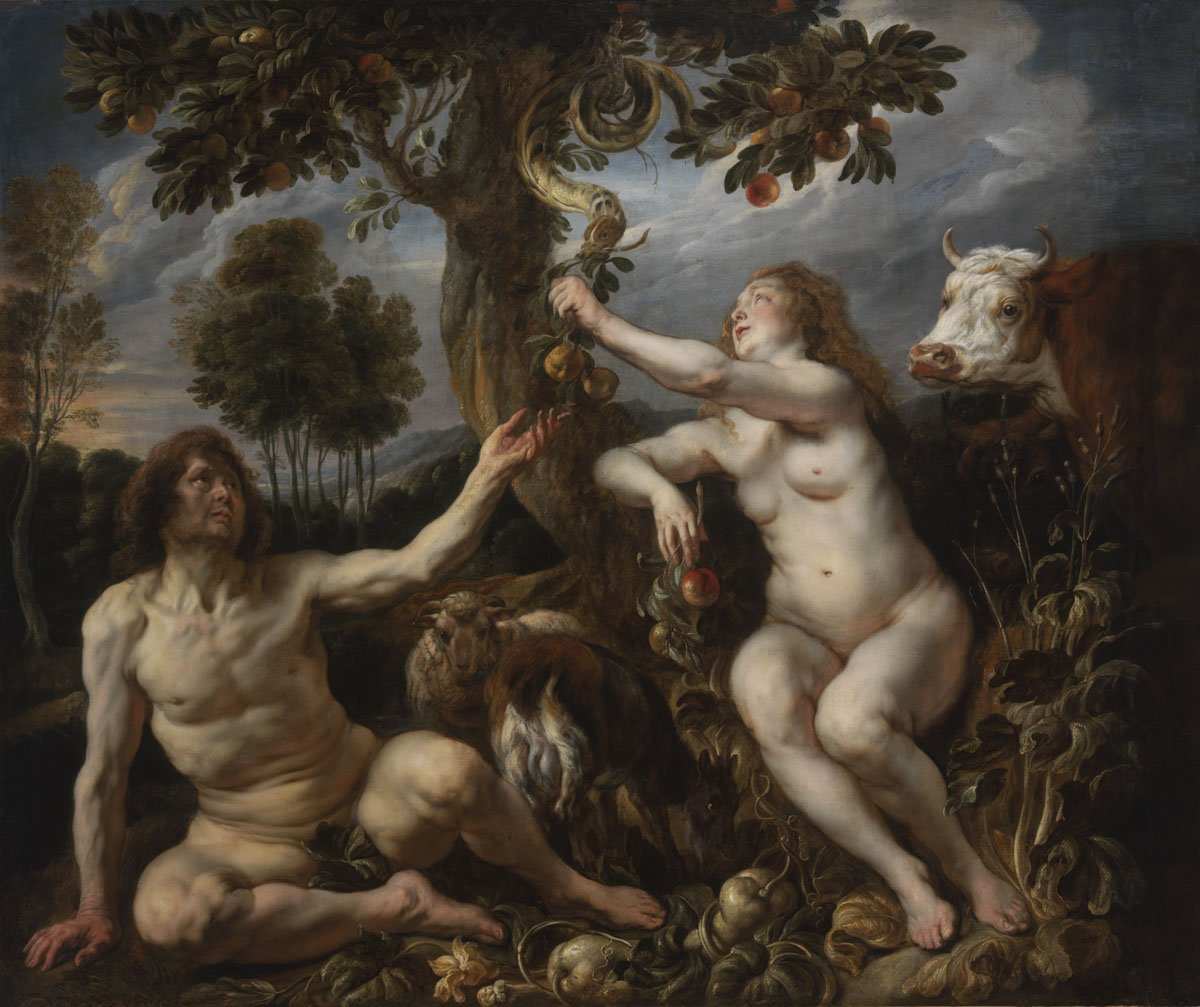
Fall of Man by Jacob Jordaens

Reformed theologians use the concept of covenant to describe the way God enters into fellowship with people in history. The concept of covenant is so prominent in Reformed theology that Reformed theology as a whole is sometimes called "covenant theology". However, sixteenth- and seventeenth-century theologians developed a particular theological system called "covenant theology" or "federal theology" which many conservative Reformed churches continue to affirm. This framework orders God's life with people primarily in two covenants: the covenant of works and the covenant of grace.

The covenant of works is made with Adam and Eve in the Garden of Eden. The terms of the covenant are that God provides a blessed life in the garden on condition that Adam and Eve obey God's law perfectly. Because Adam and Eve broke the covenant by eating the forbidden fruit, they became subject to death and were banished from the garden. This sin was passed down to all mankind because all people are said to be in Adam as a covenantal or "federal" head. Federal theologians usually imply that Adam and Eve would have gained immortality had they obeyed perfectly.

A second covenant, called the covenant of grace, is said to have been made immediately following Adam and Eve's sin. In it, God graciously offers salvation from death on condition of faith in God. This covenant is administered in different ways throughout the Old and New Testaments, but retains the substance of being free of a requirement of perfect obedience.

Through the influence of Karl Barth, many contemporary Reformed theologians have discarded the covenant of works, along with other concepts of federal theology. Barth saw the covenant of works as disconnected from Christ and the gospel, and rejected the idea that God works with people in this way. Instead, Barth argued that God always interacts with people under the covenant of grace, and that the covenant of grace is free of all conditions whatsoever. Barth's theology and that which follows him has been called "mono covenantal" as opposed to the "bi-covenantal" scheme of classical federal theology. Conservative contemporary Reformed theologians, such as John Murray, have also rejected the idea of covenants based on law rather than grace. Michael Horton, however, has defended the covenant of works as combining principles of law and love.

=== God ===
The Shield of the Trinity diagrams the classic doctrine of the Trinity.

For the most part, the Reformed tradition did not modify the medieval consensus on the doctrine of God. God's character is described primarily using three adjectives: eternal, infinite, and unchangeable. Reformed theologians such as Shirley Guthrie have proposed that rather than conceiving of God in terms of his attributes and freedom to do as he pleases, the doctrine of God is to be based on God's work in history and his freedom to live with and empower people.

Reformed theologians have also traditionally followed the medieval tradition going back to before the early church councils of Nicaea and Chalcedon on the doctrine of the Trinity. God is affirmed to be one God in three persons: Father, Son, and Holy Spirit. The Son (Christ) is held to be eternally begotten by the Father and the Holy Spirit eternally proceeding from the Father and Son. However, contemporary theologians have been critical of aspects of Western views here as well. Drawing on the Eastern tradition, these Reformed theologians have proposed a "social trinitarianism" where the persons of the Trinity only exist in their life together as persons-in-relationship. Contemporary Reformed confessions such as the Barmen Confession and Brief Statement of Faith of the Presbyterian Church (USA) have avoided language about the attributes of God and have emphasized his work of reconciliation and empowerment of people. Feminist theologian Letty Russell used the image of partnership for the persons of the Trinity. According to Russell, thinking this way encourages Christians to interact in terms of fellowship rather than reciprocity. Conservative Reformed theologian Michael Horton, however, has argued that social trinitarianism is untenable because it abandons the essential unity of God in favor of a community of separate beings.

=== Christ and atonement ===
Reformed theologians affirm the historic Christian belief that Christ is eternally one person with a divine and a human nature. Reformed Christians have especially emphasized that Christ truly became human so that people could be saved. Christ's human nature has been a point of contention between Reformed and Lutheran Christology. In accord with the belief that finite humans cannot comprehend infinite divinity, Reformed theologians hold that Christ's human body cannot be in multiple locations at the same time. Because Lutherans believe that Christ is bodily present in the Eucharist, they hold that Christ is bodily present in many locations simultaneously. For Reformed Christians, such a belief denies that Christ actually became human. Some contemporary Reformed theologians have moved away from the traditional language of one person in two natures, viewing it as unintelligible to contemporary people. Instead, theologians tend to emphasize Jesus's context and particularity as a first-century Jew.

John Calvin and many Reformed theologians who followed him describe Christ's work of redemption in terms of three offices: prophet, priest, and king. Christ is said to be a prophet in that he teaches perfect doctrine, a priest in that he intercedes to the Father on believers' behalf and offered himself as a sacrifice for sin, and a king in that he rules the church and fights on believers' behalf. The threefold office links the work of Christ to God's work in ancient Israel. Many, but not all, Reformed theologians continue to make use of the threefold office as a framework because of its emphasis on the connection of Christ's work to Israel. They have, however, often reinterpreted the meaning of each of the offices. For example, Karl Barth interpreted Christ's prophetic office in terms of political engagement on behalf of the poor.

Christians believe Jesus' death and resurrection make it possible for believers to receive forgiveness for sin and reconciliation with God through the atonement. Reformed Protestants generally subscribe to a particular view of the atonement called penal substitutionary atonement, which explains Christ's death as a sacrificial payment for sin. Christ is believed to have died in place of the believer, who is accounted righteous as a result of this sacrificial payment.

=== Sin ===
In Christian theology, people are created good and in the image of God but have become corrupted by sin, which causes them to be imperfect and overly self-interested. Reformed Christians, following the tradition of Augustine of Hippo, believe that this corruption of human nature was brought on by Adam and Eve's first sin, a doctrine called original sin.

Although earlier Christian authors taught the elements of physical death, moral weakness, and a sin propensity within original sin, Augustine was the first Christian to add the concept of inherited guilt (reatus) from Adam whereby every infant is born eternally damned and humans lack any residual ability to respond to God. Reformed theologians emphasize that this sinfulness affects all of a person's nature, including their will. This view, that sin so dominates people that they are unable to avoid sin, has been called total depravity. As a consequence, every one of their descendants inherited a stain of corruption and depravity. This condition, innate to all humans, is known in Christian theology as original sin.

Calvin thought original sin was "a hereditary corruption and depravity of our nature, extending to all the parts of the soul". Calvin asserted people were so warped by original sin that "everything which our mind conceives, meditates, plans, and resolves, is always evil". The depraved condition of every human being is not the result of sins people commit during their lives. Instead, before we are born, while we are in our mother's womb, "we are in God's sight defiled and polluted". Calvin thought people were justly condemned to hell because their corrupted state is "naturally hateful to God".

In colloquial English, the term "total depravity" can be easily misunderstood to mean that people are absent of any goodness or unable to do any good. However the Reformed teaching is actually that while people continue to bear God's image and may do things that appear outwardly good, their sinful intentions affect all of their nature and actions so that they are not pleasing to God.

=== Salvation ===
The Parable of the Prodigal Son, depicted in a portrait by Rembrandt, illustrates forgiveness.

Reformed theologians, along with other Protestants, believe salvation from punishment for sin is to be given to all those who have faith in Christ. Faith is not purely intellectual, but involves trust in God's promise to save. Protestants do not hold there to be any other requirement for salvation, but that faith alone is sufficient. However, this faith in the Lord Jesus is understood as one that effects obedience. In a commentary on Ezekiel 18, Calvin stated: "faith cannot justify when it is without works, because it is dead, and a mere fiction ... Thus faith can be no more separated from works than the sun from his heat."

Justification is the part of salvation where God pardons the sin of those who believe in Christ. It is historically held by Protestants to be the most important article of Christian faith, though more recently it is sometimes given less importance out of ecumenical concerns. People are not on their own able to fully repent of their sin or prepare themselves to repent because of their sinfulness. Therefore, justification is held to arise solely from God's free and gracious act.

Sanctification is the part of salvation in which God makes believers holy, by enabling them to exercise greater love for God and for other people. The good works accomplished by believers as they are sanctified are considered to be the necessary outworking of the believer's salvation, though they do not cause the believer to be saved. Sanctification, like justification, is by faith, because doing good works is simply living as the child of God one has become.

=== Predestination ===
Stemming from the theology of John Calvin, Reformed theologians teach that sin so affects human nature that they are unable even to exercise faith in Christ by their own will. While people are said to retain free will, in that they willfully sin, they are unable not to sin because of the corruption of their nature due to original sin. Reformed Christians believe that God predestined some people to be saved and others were predestined to eternal damnation. This choice by God to save some is held to be unconditional and not based on any characteristic or action on the part of the person chosen. The Calvinist view is opposed to the Arminian view that God's choice of whom to save is conditional or based on his foreknowledge of who would respond positively to God.

Karl Barth reinterpreted the doctrine of predestination to apply only to Christ. Individual people are only said to be elected through their being in Christ. Reformed theologians who followed Barth, including Jürgen Moltmann, David Migliore, and Shirley Guthrie, have argued that the traditional Reformed concept of predestination is speculative and have proposed alternative models. These theologians claim that a properly trinitarian doctrine emphasizes God's freedom to love all people, rather than choosing some for salvation and others for damnation. God's justice towards and condemnation of sinful people is spoken of by these theologians as out of his love for them and a desire to reconcile them to himself.

==== Five Points of Calvinism ====
Much attention surrounding Calvinism focuses on the "Five Points of Calvinism" (also called the doctrines of grace). The five points have been summarized under the acrostic TULIP, representing total depravity, unconditional election, limited atonement, irresistible grace and perseverance of the saints. Another list was proposed by author Lloyd Immanuel Acree as S-I-M-P-L-E, listed S, Segregated Atonement; I, Involuntary Reconciliation; M, Mystery Relationship; P, Preemptive Reprobation; L, Lethargic Election; and E, Effectual Disdain: offered to clear up the negative outcomes represented in but unaddressed by the use of TULIP ( https://x.com/i/status/2029216047920746902 ) The five points are popularly said to summarize the Canons of Dort; however, there is no historical relationship between them, and some scholars argue that their language distorts the meaning of the Canons, Calvin's theology, and the theology of 17th-century Calvinistic orthodoxy, particularly in the language of total depravity and limited atonement. The five points were more recently popularized in the 1963 booklet The Five Points of Calvinism Defined, Defended, Documented by David N. Steele and Curtis C. Thomas. The origins of the five points and the acrostic are uncertain, but they appear to be outlined in the Counter Remonstrance of 1611, a lesser-known Reformed reply to the Arminians, which was written prior to the Canons of Dort. The acrostic was used by Cleland Boyd McAfee as early as circa 1905. An early printed appearance of the acrostic can be found in Loraine Boettner's 1932 book, The Reformed Doctrine of Predestination.

=== Church ===
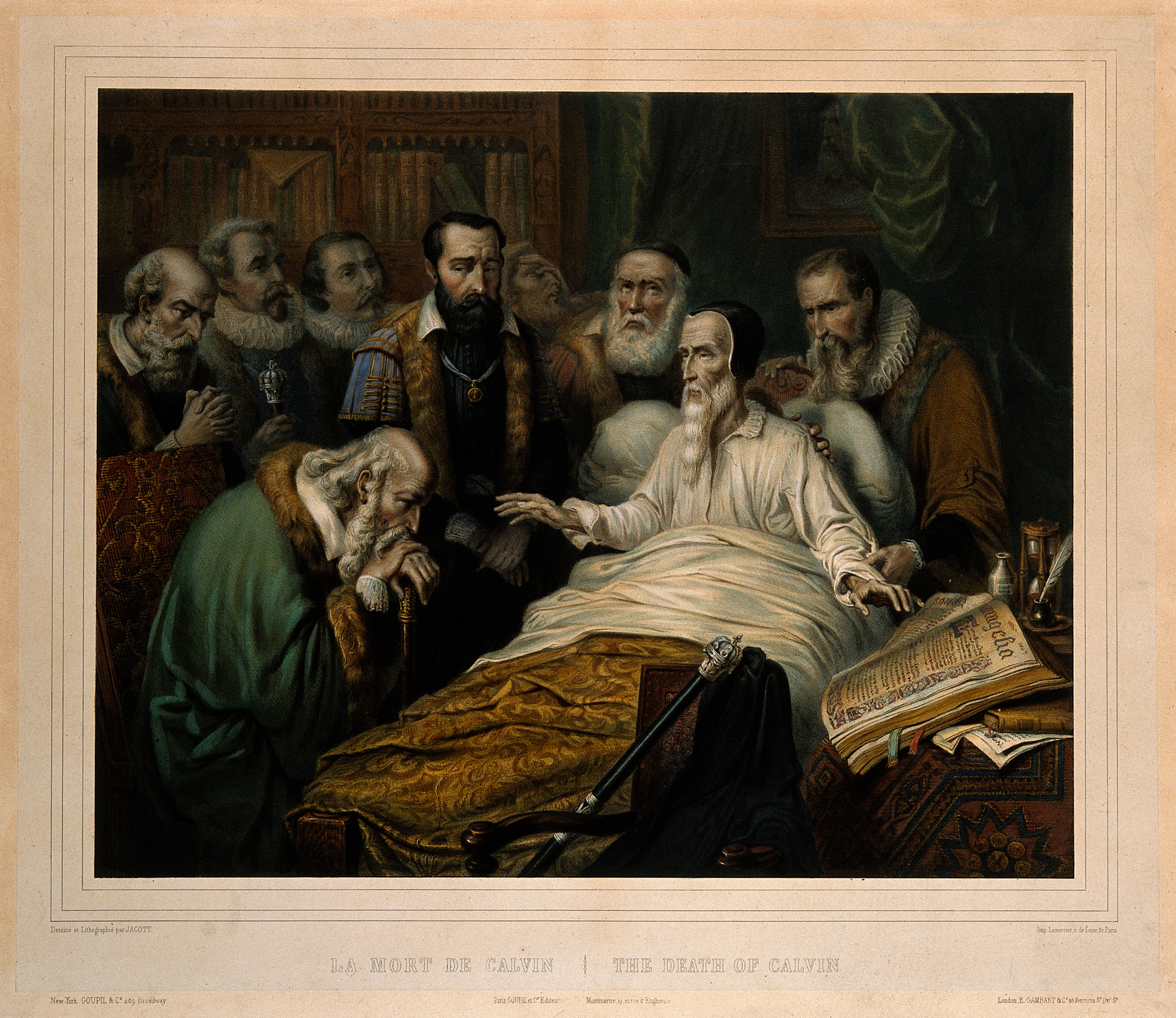
John Calvin depicted on his deathbed with church members in The last moments of Calvin, a late 19th century portrait by Lluís Domènech i Montaner

Reformed Christians see the Christian Church as the community with which God has made the covenant of grace, a promise of eternal life and relationship with God. This covenant extends to those under the "old covenant" whom God chose, beginning with Abraham and Sarah. The church is conceived of as both invisible and visible. The invisible church is the body of all believers, known only to God. The visible church is the institutional body which contains both members of the invisible church as well as those who appear to have faith in Christ, but are not truly part of God's elect.

In order to identify the visible church, Reformed theologians have spoken of certain marks of the Church. For some, the only mark is the pure preaching of the gospel of Christ. Others, including John Calvin, also include the right administration of the sacraments. Others, such as those following the Scots Confession, include a third mark of rightly administered church discipline, or exercise of censure against unrepentant sinners. These marks allowed the Reformed to identify the church based on its conformity to the Bible rather than the magisterium or church tradition.

=== Worship ===
==== Regulative principle of worship ====
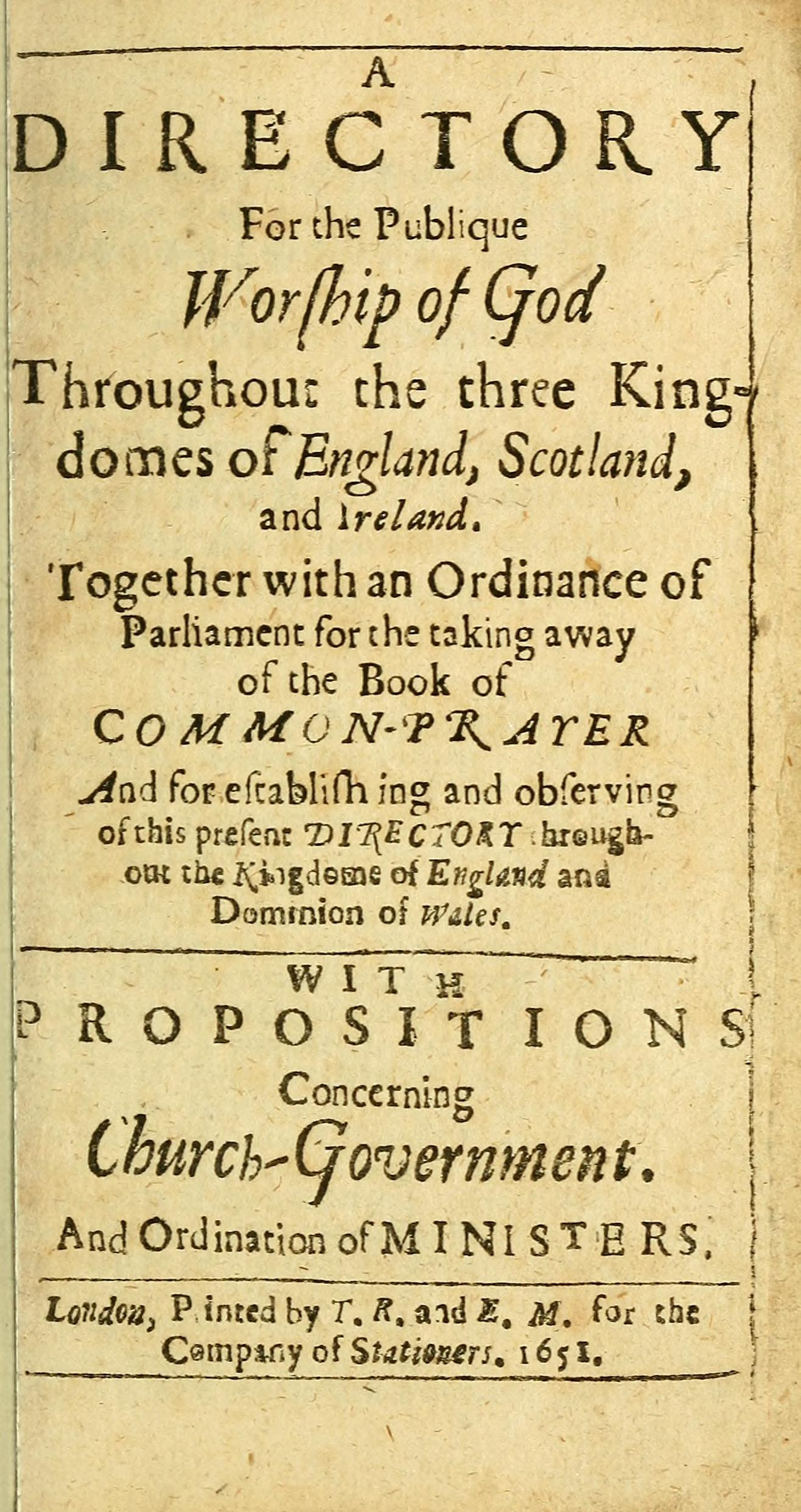
The Directory for Public Worship described what should (and should not) occur in worship.

The regulative principle of worship is a teaching shared by some Calvinists and Anabaptists on how the Bible orders public worship. The substance of the doctrine regarding worship is that God institutes in the Scriptures everything he requires for worship in the Church and that everything else is prohibited. As the regulative principle is reflected in Calvin's own thought, it is driven by his evident antipathy toward the Roman Catholic Church and its worship practices, and it associates musical instruments with icons, which he considered violations of the Ten Commandments' prohibition of graven images.

On this basis, many early Calvinists also eschewed musical instruments and advocated a cappella exclusive psalmody in worship, though Calvin himself allowed other scriptural songs as well as psalms, and this practice typified Presbyterian worship and the worship of other Reformed churches for some time. The original Lord's Day service designed by John Calvin was a highly liturgical service with the Creed, Alms, Confession and Absolution, the Lord's supper, Doxologies, prayers, Psalms being sung, the Lords prayer being sung, and Benedictions.

Since the 19th century, however, some of the Reformed churches have modified their understanding of the regulative principle and make use of musical instruments, believing that Calvin and his early followers went beyond the biblical requirements and that such things are circumstances of worship requiring biblically rooted wisdom, rather than an explicit command. Despite the protestations of those who hold to a strict view of the regulative principle, today hymns and musical instruments are in common use, as are contemporary worship music styles with elements such as worship bands.

=== Sacraments ===
The Westminster Confession of Faith limits the sacraments to baptism and the Lord's Supper. Sacraments are denoted "signs and seals of the covenant of grace". Westminster speaks of "a sacramental relation, or a sacramental union, between the sign and the thing signified; whence it comes to pass that the names and effects of the one are attributed to the other". Baptism is for infant children of believers as well as believers, as it is for all the Reformed except Baptists and some Congregationalists. Baptism admits the baptized into the visible church, and in it all the benefits of Christ are offered to the baptized. On the Lord's supper, the Westminster Confession takes a position between Lutheran sacramental union and Zwinglian memorialism: "the Lord's supper really and indeed, yet not carnally and corporally, but spiritually, receive and feed upon Christ crucified, and all benefits of his death: the body and blood of Christ being then not corporally or carnally in, with, or under the bread and wine; yet, as really, but spiritually, present to the faith of believers in that ordinance as the elements themselves are to their outward senses".

The 1689 London Baptist Confession of Faith does not use the term sacrament, but describes baptism and the Lord's supper as ordinances, as do most Baptists, Calvinist or otherwise. Baptism is only for those who "actually profess repentance towards God", and not for the children of believers. Baptists also insist on immersion or dipping, in contradistinction to other Reformed Christians. The Baptist Confession describes the Lord's supper as "the body and blood of Christ being then not corporally or carnally, but spiritually present to the faith of believers in that ordinance", similarly to the Westminster Confession. There is significant latitude in Baptist congregations regarding the Lord's supper, and many hold the Zwinglian view.

=== Logical order of God's decree ===
There are two schools of thought regarding the logical order of God's decree to ordain the fall of man: supralapsarianism (from the Latin: supra, "above", here meaning "before" + lapsus, "fall") and infralapsarianism (from the Latin: infra, "beneath", here meaning "after" + lapsus, "fall"). The former view, sometimes called "high Calvinism", argues that the Fall occurred partly to facilitate God's purpose to choose some individuals for salvation and some for damnation. Infralapsarianism, sometimes called "low Calvinism", is the position that, while the Fall was indeed planned, it was not planned with reference to who would be saved.

Supralapsarianism is based on the belief that God chose which individuals to save logically prior to the decision to allow the race to fall and that the Fall serves as the means of realization of that prior decision to send some individuals to hell and others to heaven (that is, it provides the grounds of condemnation in the reprobate and the need for salvation in the elect). In contrast, infralapsarians hold that God planned the race to fall logically prior to the decision to save or damn any individuals because, it is argued, in order to be "saved", one must first need to be saved from something and therefore the decree of the Fall must precede predestination to salvation or damnation.

These two views vied with each other at the Synod of Dort, an international body representing Calvinist Christian churches from around Europe, and the judgments that came out of that council sided with infralapsarianism (Canons of Dort, First Point of Doctrine, Article 7). The Westminster Confession of Faith also teaches (in Hodge's words "clearly impl[ies]") the infralapsarian view, but is sensitive to those holding to supralapsarianism. The Lapsarian controversy has a few vocal proponents on each side today, but overall it does not receive much attention among modern Calvinists.

== Branches ==
The Reformed tradition is historically represented by the Continental, Presbyterian, Reformed Anglican, Congregationalist, Calvinistic Methodist and Reformed Baptist denominational families.

Reformed churches practice several forms of church government, primarily presbyterian and congregational, but some adhere to episcopal polity. The largest interdenominational association is the World Communion of Reformed Churches with more than 100 million members in 211 member denominations around the world. Smaller, conservative Reformed associations include the World Reformed Fellowship and the International Conference of Reformed Churches.

=== Continental ===
"Continental" Reformed churches originate in continental Europe, a term used by English speakers to distinguish them from traditions from the British Isles. Many uphold the Helvetic Confessions and Heidelberg Catechism, which were adopted in Zurich and Heidelberg, respectively. In the United States, immigrants belonging to the continental Reformed churches joined the Dutch Reformed Church there, as well as the Anglican Church.

=== Presbyterian ===
Presbyterian churches are named for their order of government by assemblies of elders, or presbyters. They are especially influenced by John Knox, who brought Reformed theology and polity to the Church of Scotland after spending time on the continent in Calvin's Geneva. Presbyterians historically uphold the Westminster Confession of Faith.

=== Congregational ===
Congregationalism originates in Puritanism, a sixteenth-century movement to reform the Church of England. Unlike the Presbyterians, Congregationalists consider the local church to be rightfully self-ruled by their own officers, not higher ecclesiastical courts. The Savoy Declaration, a revision of Westminster, is the primary confession of historic Congregationalism. Evangelical Congregationalists are internationally represented by the World Evangelical Congregational Fellowship. Christian denominations in the Congregationalist tradition include the United Church of Christ, the National Association of Congregational Christian Churches and the Conservative Congregational Christian Conference in the United States, Evangelical Congregational Church in Argentina and Evangelical Fellowship of Congregational Churches in the United Kingdom, among others.

=== Anglican ===
Though Anglicanism today is often described its own branch of Protestantism, historic Anglicanism is a part of the wider Reformed tradition. The foundational documents of the Anglican church "express a theology in keeping with the Reformed theology of the Swiss and South German Reformation." The Most Rev. Peter Robinson, presiding bishop of the United Episcopal Church of North America, writes:

Cranmer's personal journey of faith left its mark on the Church of England in the form of a Liturgy that remains to this day more closely allied to Lutheran practice, but that liturgy is couple to a doctrinal stance that is broadly, but decidedly Reformed. ... The 42 Articles of 1552 and the 39 Articles of 1563, both commit the Church of England to the fundamentals of the Reformed Faith. Both sets of Articles affirm the centrality of Scripture, and take a monergist position on Justification. Both sets of Articles affirm that the Church of England accepts the doctrine of predestination and election as a 'comfort to the faithful' but warn against over much speculation concerning that doctrine. Indeed a casual reading of the Wurttemburg Confession of 1551, the Second Helvetic Confession, the Scots Confession of 1560, and the XXXIX Articles of Religion reveal them to be cut from the same bolt of cloth.

=== Reformed Methodist ===
Reformed Methodists, also known as Calvinistic Methodists, form a minority of the Methodist tradition. The majority of Methodism falls outside the Reformed faith, being Wesleyan Methodism, which subscribes to Wesleyan-Arminian theology. Calvinistic Methodists adhere to Reformed theology codified in the "Confession of Faith of the Calvinistic Methodists" (1823). In the United Kingdom, the Calvinistic Methodist Church is also known as the Presbyterian Church of Wales. Calvinistic Methodists are characterized by their emphasis on Methodist worship distinctives—preaching, hymn singing, lovefeasts, revival services, and camp meetings, as well as the Methodist doctrines of the New Birth and growth in grace. Reformed Methodist divines include George Whitefield and Howell Harris.

=== Reformed Baptist ===
Reformed Baptists or Calvinistic Baptists, unlike other Reformed groups, exclusively practice believer's baptism. They observe a more congregational polity, taken from the Congregationalists. Their primary confession is the Second London Confession of Faith of 1689, a revision of the Savoy Declaration from the Congregationalists, and the Westminster Confession of Faith, from the Presbyterians, but other Baptist confessions like the First London Confession are also used. Not all Baptists are Particular Baptists, and, in fact, the Baptist tradition didn't start Particular Baptist, but General Baptist. Many Reformed Baptists accept Reformed theology, especially soteriology, and a covenantal theology, named the Baptist covenant theology.

== Variants in Reformed theology ==
=== Amyraldism ===
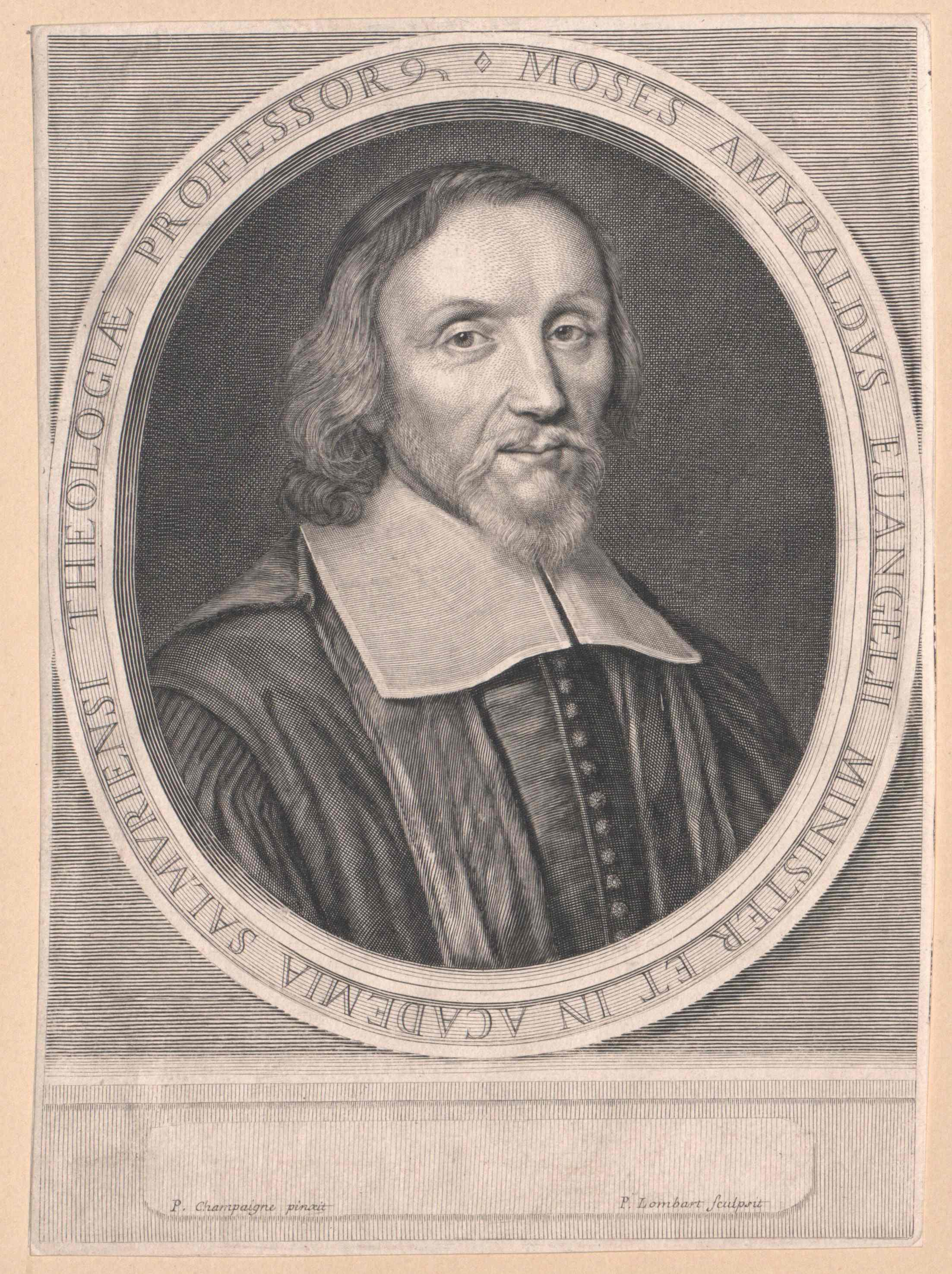
Moses Amyraut formulated Amyraldism, a modified Calvinist theology regarding the nature of Jesus' atonement.

Amyraldism (or sometimes Amyraldianism, also known as the School of Saumur, hypothetical universalism, post redemptionism, moderate Calvinism, or four-point Calvinism) is the belief that God, prior to his decree of election, decreed Christ's atonement for all alike if they believe, but seeing that none would believe on their own, he then elected those whom he will bring to faith in Christ, thereby preserving the Calvinist doctrine of unconditional election. The efficacy of the atonement remains limited to those who believe.

Named after its formulator Moses Amyraut, this doctrine is still viewed as a variety of Calvinism in that it maintains the particularity of sovereign grace in the application of the atonement. However, detractors like B. B. Warfield have termed it "an inconsistent and therefore unstable form of Calvinism."

=== Hyper-Calvinism ===
Hyper-Calvinism is the belief that emphasizes God's sovereignty in election and salvation to such an extent that it rejects the responsibility of all people to "repent and believe" the gospel. This belief system became prominent among some of the early English Particular Baptists in the 18th century. Historically, it has been associated with theologians such as John Gill and Joseph Hussey who contributed to the development of its distinct views. This variant of Reformed Theology was opposed by ministers such as Andrew Fuller and missionaries such as William Carey who argued against the Hyper-Calvinistic mindset that "if God wants to save the heathen, He will do it without your help or mine."

The Westminster Confession of Faith says that the gospel is to be freely offered to sinners, and the Larger Catechism makes clear that the gospel is offered to the non-elect.

The term is also used as a pejorative and occasionally appears in both theological and secular controversial contexts. It usually connotes a negative opinion about some variety of theological determinism, predestination, or a version of Evangelical Christianity or Calvinism that is deemed by the critic to be unenlightened, harsh, or extreme.

=== Neo-Calvinism ===
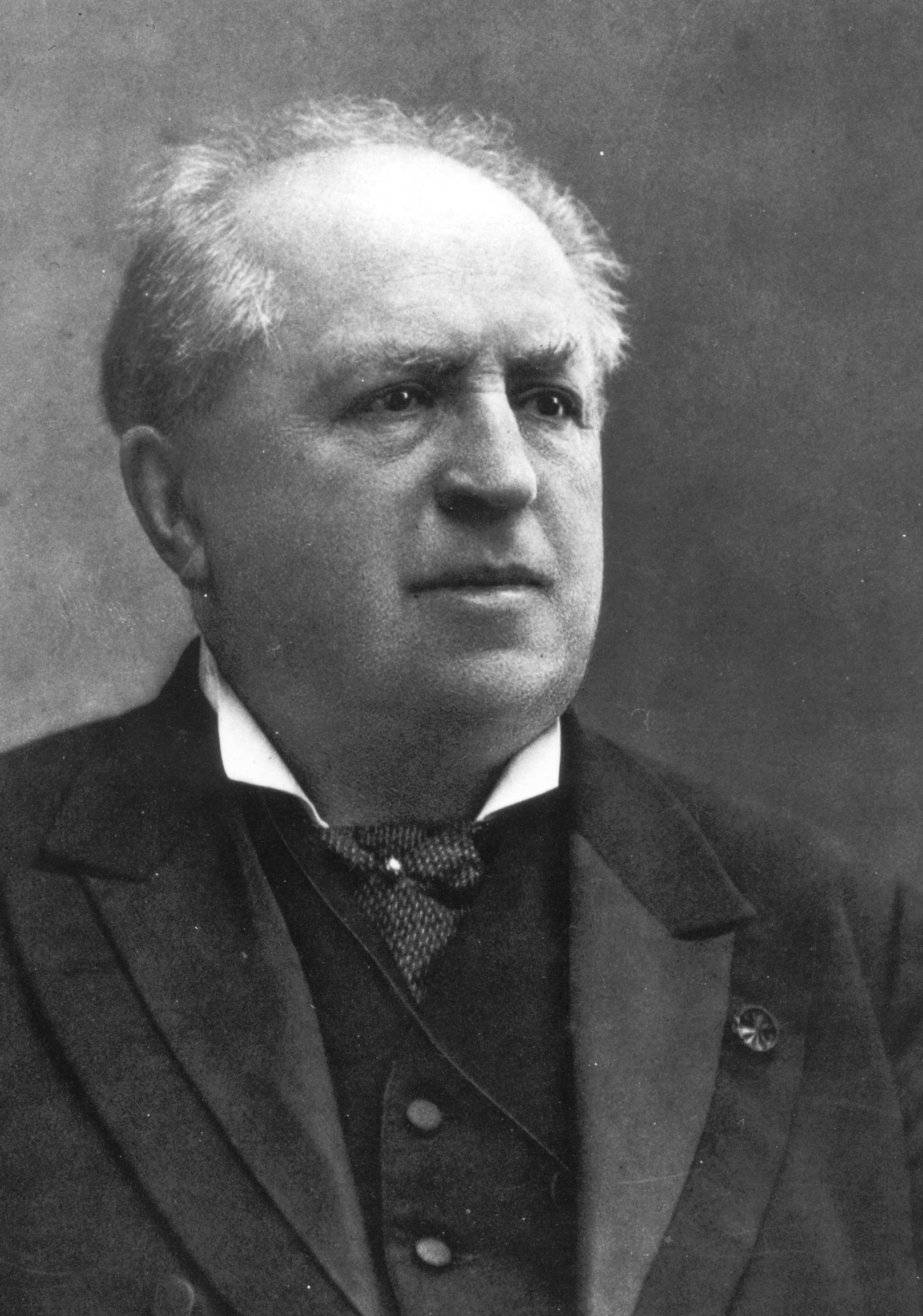
Dutch prime minister Abraham Kuyper initiated Neo-Calvinism.

Beginning in the 1880s, Neo-Calvinism, a form of Dutch Calvinism, is the movement initiated by the theologian and later Dutch prime minister Abraham Kuyper. James Bratt has identified a number of different types of Dutch Calvinism: The Seceders—split into the Reformed Church "West" and the Confessionalists; and the Neo-Calvinists—the Positives and the Antithetical Calvinists. The Seceders were largely infralapsarian and the Neo-Calvinists usually supralapsarian.

Kuyper wanted to awaken the church from what he viewed as its pietistic slumber. He declared:

No single piece of our mental world is to be sealed off from the rest and there is not a square inch in the whole domain of human existence over which Christ, who is sovereign over all, does not cry: 'Mine!'

This refrain has become something of a rallying call for Neo-Calvinists.

=== Christian Reconstructionism ===
Christian Reconstructionism is a fundamentalist Calvinist theonomic movement that has remained rather obscure. Founded by R. J. Rushdoony, the movement has had an important influence on the Christian Right in the United States. The movement peaked in the 1990s. However, it lives on in small denominations such as the Reformed Presbyterian Church in the United States and as a minority position in other denominations. Christian Reconstructionists are usually postmillennialists and followers of the presuppositional apologetics of Cornelius Van Til. They tend to support a decentralized political order resulting in laissez-faire capitalism.

=== New Calvinism ===
New Calvinism is a growing perspective within conservative Evangelicalism that embraces the fundamentals of 16th century Calvinism while also trying to be relevant in the present day world. In March 2009, Time magazine described the New Calvinism as one of the "10 ideas changing the world". Some of the major figures who have been associated with the New Calvinism are John Piper, Mark Driscoll, Al Mohler, Mark Dever, C. J. Mahaney, and Tim Keller. New Calvinists have been criticized for blending Calvinist soteriology with popular Evangelical positions on the sacraments and continuationism and for rejecting tenets seen as crucial to the Reformed faith such as confessionalism and covenant theology.

== Social and economic influences ==
Calvin expressed himself on usury in a 1545 letter to a friend, Claude de Sachin, in which he criticized the use of certain passages of scripture invoked by people opposed to the charging of interest. He reinterpreted some of these passages, and suggested that others of them had been rendered irrelevant by changed conditions. He also dismissed the argument (based upon the writings of Aristotle) that it is wrong to charge interest for money because money itself is barren. He said that the walls and the roof of a house are barren, too, but it is permissible to charge someone for allowing him to use them. In the same way, money can be made fruitful.

He qualified his view, however, by saying that money should be lent to people in dire need without hope of interest, while a modest interest rate of 5% should be permitted in relation to other borrowers.

In The Protestant Ethic and the Spirit of Capitalism, Max Weber wrote that capitalism in Northern Europe evolved when the Protestant (particularly Calvinist) ethic influenced large numbers of people to engage in work in the secular world, developing their own enterprises and engaging in trade and the accumulation of wealth for investment. In other words, the Protestant work ethic was an important force behind the unplanned and uncoordinated emergence of modern capitalism.

Expert researchers and authors have referred to the United States as a "Protestant nation" or "founded on Protestant principles," specifically emphasizing its Calvinist heritage.

== Politics and society ==
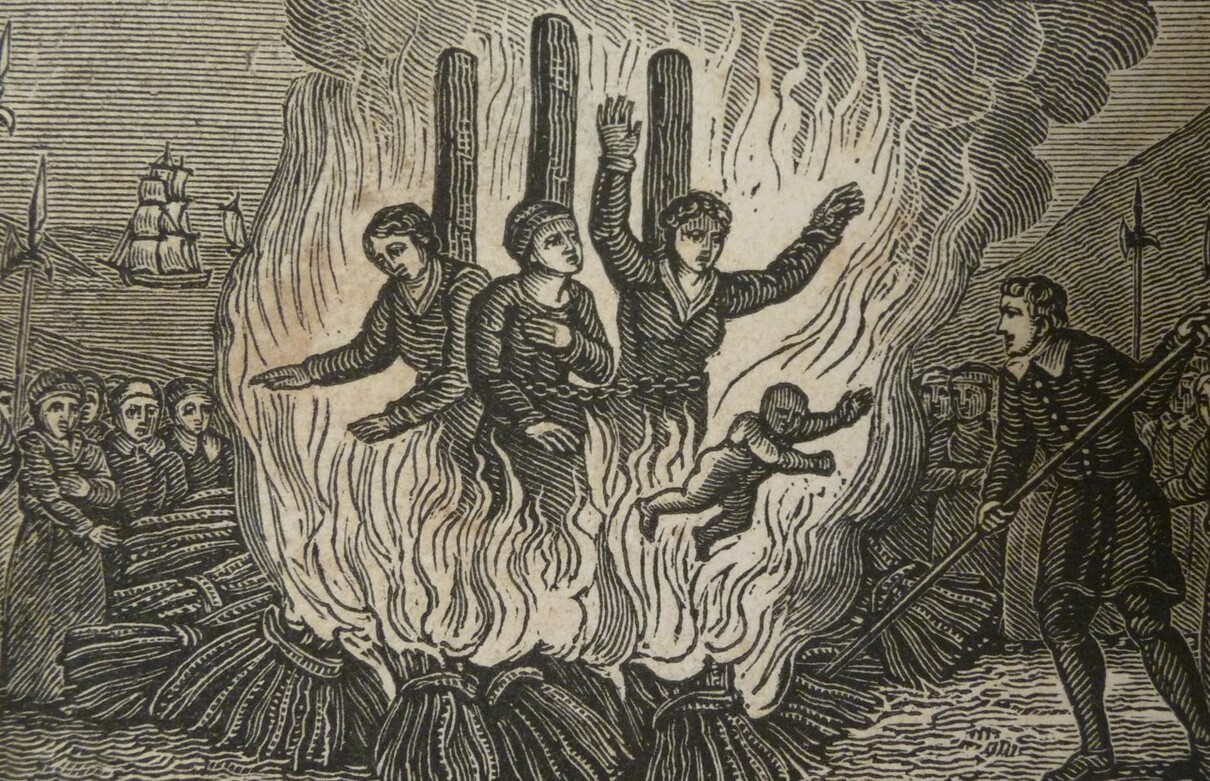
The burning of the Guernsey Martyrs during the Marian persecutions in 1556

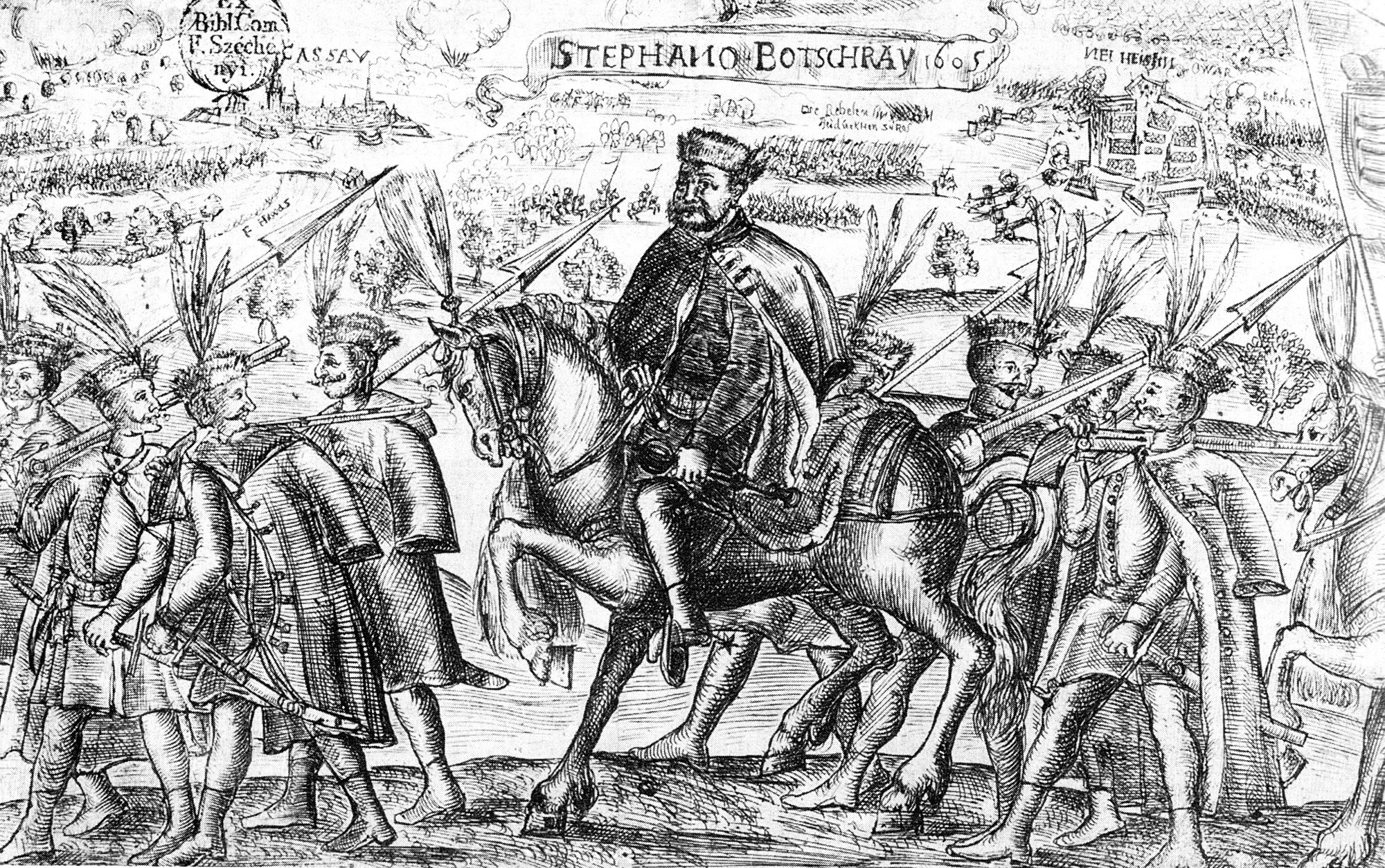
Stephen Bocskai, leader of Hungarian Calvinists in the anti-Habsburg rebellion and first Calvinist prince of Transylvania (r. 1605–1606)

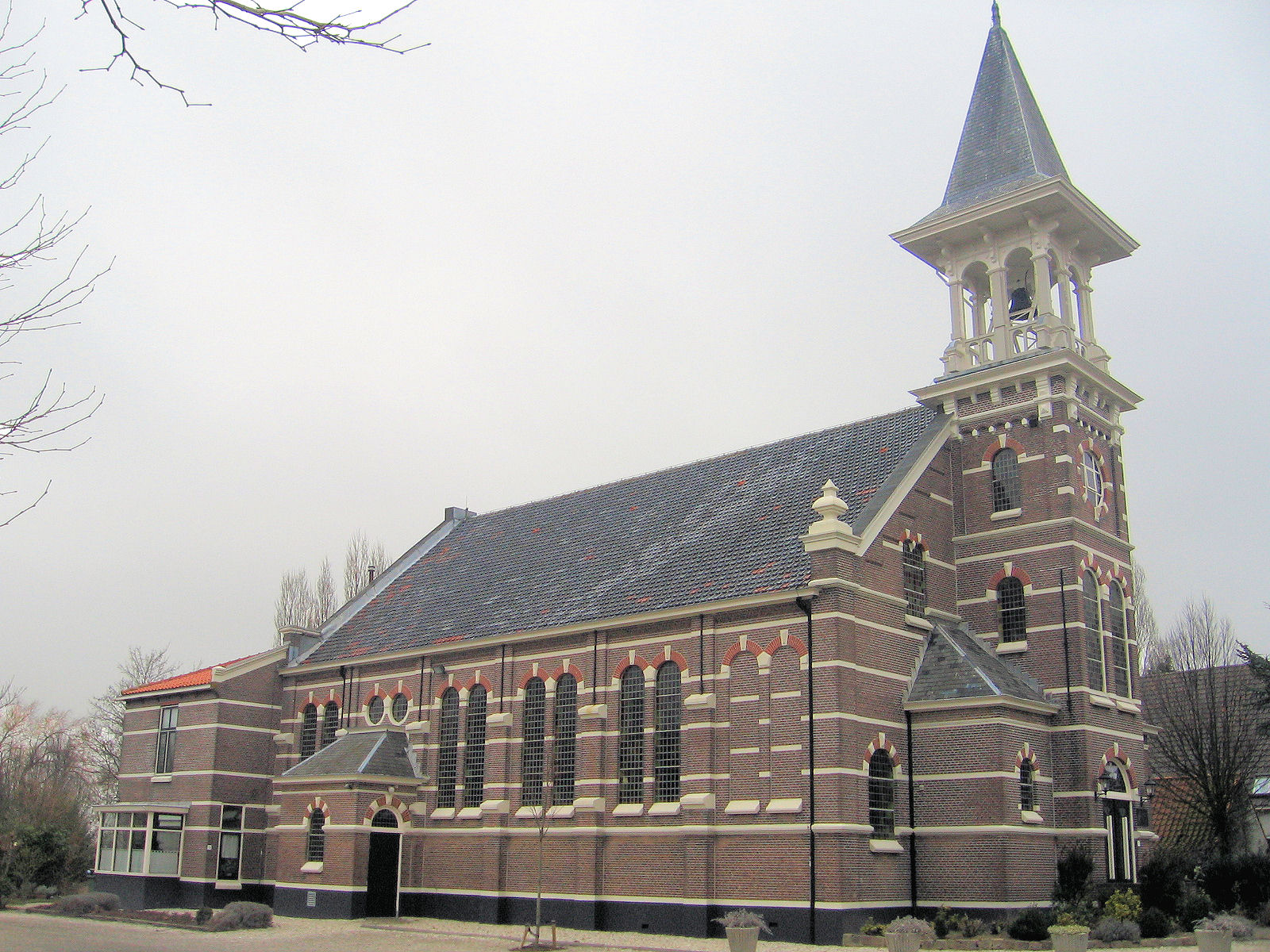
A Reformed church in Koudekerk aan den Rijn in the Netherlands in the 19th century

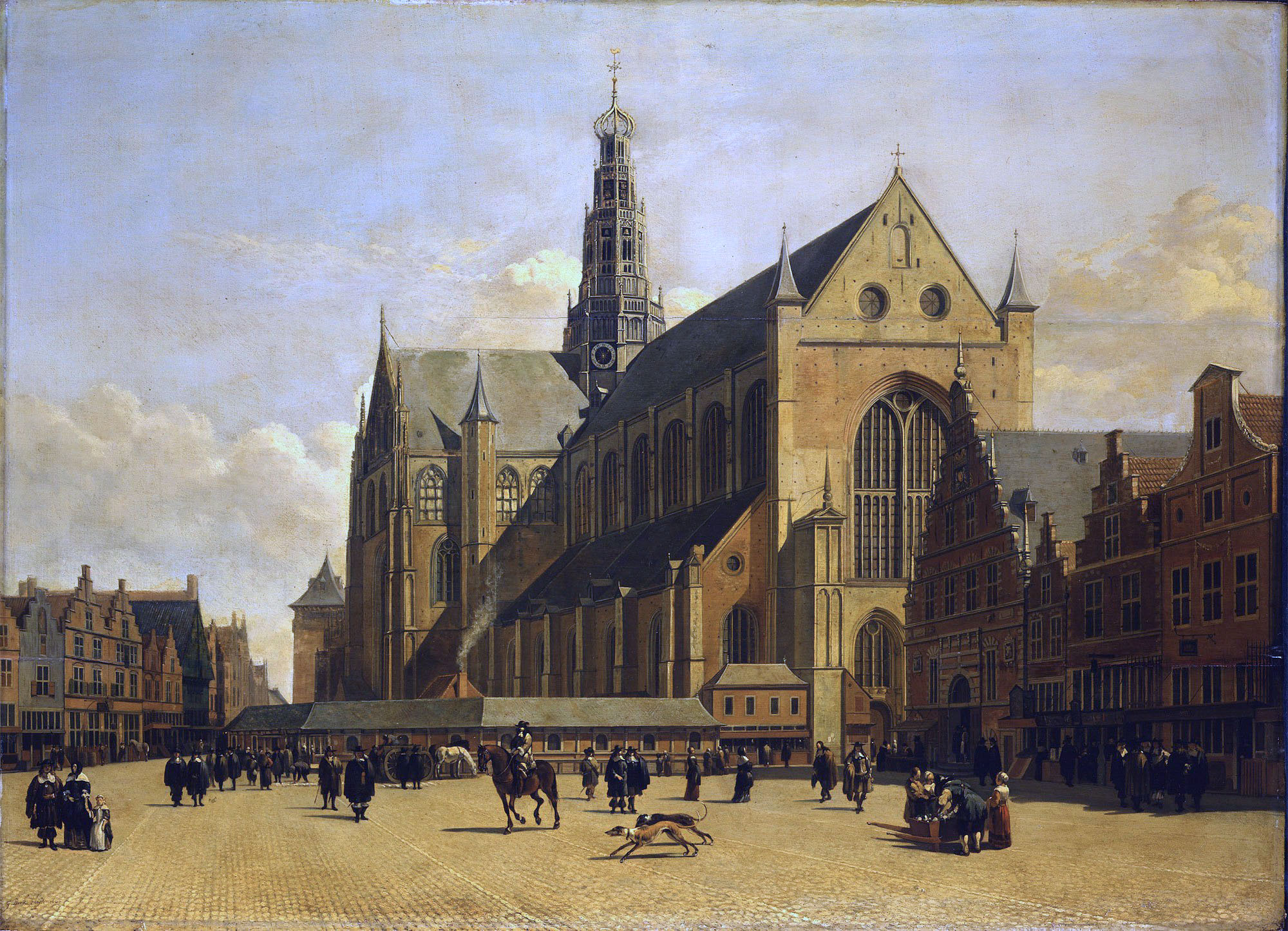
The Grote Kerk in Haarlem in the Dutch Republic, c. 1665

Calvin's concepts of God and man led to ideas which were gradually put into practice after his death, in particular in the fields of politics and society. After their fight for independence from Spain (1579), the Netherlands, under Calvinist leadership, granted asylum to religious minorities, including French Huguenots, English Independents (Congregationalists), and Jews from Spain and Portugal. The ancestors of the philosopher Baruch Spinoza were Portuguese Jews. Aware of the trial against Galileo, René Descartes lived in the Netherlands, out of reach of the Inquisition, from 1628 to 1649. Pierre Bayle, a Reformed Frenchman, also felt safer in the Netherlands than in his home country. He was the first prominent philosopher who demanded tolerance for atheists. Hugo Grotius (1583–1645) was able to publish a rather liberal interpretation of the Bible and his ideas about natural law in the Netherlands. Moreover, the Calvinist Dutch authorities allowed the printing of books that could not be published elsewhere, such as Galileo's Discorsi (1638).

Alongside the liberal development of the Netherlands came the rise of modern democracy in England and North America. In the Middle Ages, state and church had been closely connected. Martin Luther's doctrine of the two kingdoms separated state and church in principle. His doctrine of the priesthood of all believers raised the laity to the same level as the clergy, although Lutherans were content to allow the state to control the administration of the church.

In Geneva Calvin was more careful than Luther to keep church structures and city authorities apart and going one step further than Luther he included elected laymen (church elders, presbyters) in his concept of church government. In general the Reformed followed Calvin's lead in insisting that the church's external administration, including the right to excommunicate, not be handed over to the state. The Huguenots added synods whose members were also elected by the congregations. The other Reformed churches took over this system of church self-government, which was essentially a representative democracy. Baptists, Quakers, and Methodists are organized in a similar way. These denominations and the Anglican Church were influenced by Calvin's theology in varying degrees.

In another factor in the rise of democracy in the Anglo-American world, Calvin favored a mixture of democracy and aristocracy as the best form of government (mixed government). He appreciated the advantages of democracy. His political thought aimed to safeguard the rights and freedoms of ordinary men and women. In order to minimize the misuse of political power he suggested dividing it among several institutions in a system of checks and balances (separation of powers). Finally, Calvin taught that if worldly rulers rise up against God they should be put down. In this way, he and his followers stood in the vanguard of resistance to political absolutism and furthered the cause of democracy, although Calvin himself was alarmed about his arguments being used for revolutionary movements. The Congregationalists who founded Plymouth Colony (1620) and Massachusetts Bay Colony (1628) were convinced that the democratic form of government was the will of God. Enjoying self-rule, they practiced separation of powers. Rhode Island, Connecticut, and Pennsylvania, founded by Roger Williams, Thomas Hooker, and William Penn, respectively, combined democratic government with a limited freedom of religion that did not extend to Catholics (Congregationalism being the established, tax-supported religion in Connecticut). These colonies became safe havens for persecuted religious minorities, including Jews.

In England, Baptists Thomas Helwys (c. 1575–c. 1616), and John Smyth (c. 1554–c. 1612) influenced the liberal political thought of the Presbyterian poet and politician John Milton (1608–1674) and of the philosopher John Locke (1632–1704), who in turn had both a strong impact on the political development in their home country (English Civil War of 1642–1651, Glorious Revolution of 1688) as well as in North America. The ideological basis of the American Revolution was largely provided by the radical Whigs, who had been inspired by Milton, Locke, James Harrington (1611–1677), Algernon Sidney (1623–1683), and other thinkers. The Whigs' "perceptions of politics attracted widespread support in America because they revived the traditional concerns of a Protestantism that had always verged on Puritanism". The United States Declaration of Independence, the United States Constitution and (American) Bill of Rights initiated a tradition of human and civil rights that continued in the French Declaration of the Rights of Man and of the Citizen and the constitutions of numerous countries around the world, e.g. Latin America, Japan, India, Germany, and other European countries. It is also echoed in the United Nations Charter and the Universal Declaration of Human Rights.

In the 19th century, churches based on or influenced by Calvin's theology became deeply involved in social reforms, e.g. the abolition of slavery (William Wilberforce, Harriet Beecher Stowe, Abraham Lincoln, and others), women suffrage, and prison reforms. Members of these churches formed co-operatives to help the impoverished masses. The founders of the Red Cross Movement, including Henry Dunant, were Reformed Christians. Their movement also initiated the Geneva Conventions.

Throughout the world, the Reformed churches operate hospitals, homes for handicapped or elderly people, and educational institutions on all levels. For example, American Congregationalists founded Harvard University (1636), Yale University (1701), and about a dozen other colleges. A particular stream of influence of Calvinism concerns art. Visual art cemented society in the first modern nation state, the Netherlands, and also Neo-Calvinism put much weight on this aspect of life. Hans Rookmaaker is the most prolific example. In literature the non-fiction of Marilynne Robinson argues for the modernity of Calvin's thinking, calling him a humanist scholar (p. 174, The Death of Adam).

== See also ==
- List of Calvinist educational institutions in North America
- List of Reformed denominations
- Synod of Jerusalem (1672): Eastern Orthodox council rejecting Calvinist beliefs
- Criticism of Protestantism
- The Protestant Ethic and the Spirit of Capitalism (1905) – Max Weber's analysis of Calvinism's influence on society and economics

=== Doctrine ===
- Common grace
- Reformed confessions of faith

=== Related ===
- Boer Calvinists: Boere-Afrikaners that hold to Reformed theology
- Continental Reformed church: Calvinist churches originating in continental Europe
- Augustinian soteriology : Augustine of Hippo's soteriology, which later influenced Calvinism
- Huguenots: followers of Calvinism in France, originating in the 16th and 17th century
- Pilgrims: English Separatists who left Europe for America in search of religious toleration, eventually settling in New England
- Presbyterians: Calvinists in countries worldwide
- Puritans: English Protestants who wanted to purify the Church of England
- Waldensians: Italian Protestants, preceded Calvinism but today identify with Reformed theology
- Finished Work Pentecostalism: Pentecostal doctrine, which retains progressive sanctification from its Reformed roots, propagated by ministers with Presbyterian and Baptist backgrounds.

=== Opposing views ===
- Arminianism
- Catholicism
  - Augustinianism
- Christian universalism
- Eastern Orthodoxy
  - Palamism
- Free Grace theology
- Open theism
- Lutheranism
- Molinism
- Socinianism

== Bibliography ==
- Allen, R. Michael (2010). Reformed Theology. Doing Theology. New York: T&T Clark. ISBN 978-0-567-03430-4.
- Bagchi, David V. N.; Steinmetz, David Curtis, eds. (2004), The Cambridge Companion to Reformation Theology, Cambridge: Cambridge University Press, ISBN 0-521-77662-7
- Busch, Eberhard (December 2008). Visser, Douwe (ed.). "Reformed Identity" (PDF). Reformed World. 58 (4): 207–218.
- Cottret, Bernard (2000) [1995], Calvin: Biographie [Calvin: A Biography] (in French), Translated by M. Wallace McDonald, Grand Rapids, Michigan: Wm. B. Eerdmans, ISBN 0-8028-3159-1.
- Cross, Frank Leslie; Livingstone, Elizabeth A. (2005). Cross, F. L.; Livingstone, E. A. (eds.). The Oxford Dictionary of the Christian Church (3rd ed.). Oxford: University Press. doi:10.1093/acref/9780192802903.001.0001. ISBN 978-0-19-280290-3.
- DeVries, Dawn (2003). "Rethinking the Scripture Principle". In Alston, Wallace M. Jr.; Welker, Michael (eds.). Reformed Theology: Identity and Ecumenicity. Grand Rapids, Michigan, U.S.: William B. Eerdmans Publishing Company. pp. 294–310. ISBN 978-0-8028-4776-8.
- Farley, Edward; Hodgson, Peter C. (1994). "Scripture and Tradition". In Hodgson, Peter C.; King, Robert H. (eds.). Christian Theology: An Introduction to Its Traditions and Tasks. Minneapolis, Minnesota, U.S.: Fortress Press.
- Furcha, E. J., ed. (1985), Huldrych Zwingli, 1484–1531: A Legacy of Radical Reform: Papers from the 1984 International Zwingli Symposium McGill University, Montreal, Canada: Faculty of Religious Studies, McGill University, ISBN 0-7717-0124-1.
- Guthrie, Shirlie C. Jr. (2008). Always Being Reformed (Second ed.). Louisville, Kentucky, U.S.: Westminster John Knox Press.
- Holder, R. Ward (2004), "Calvin's heritage", in McKim, Donald K. (ed.), The Cambridge Companion to John Calvin, Cambridge: Cambridge University Press, ISBN 978-0-521-01672-8
- Gäbler, Ulrich (1986), Huldrych Zwingli: His Life and Work, Philadelphia, Pennsylvania, U.S.: Fortress Press, ISBN 0-8006-0761-9
- Ganoczy, Alexandre (2004), "Calvin's life", in McKim, Donald K. (ed.), The Cambridge Companion to John Calvin, Cambridge: Cambridge University Press, ISBN 978-0-521-01672-8
- Horton, Michael (2011a). The Christian Faith. Grand Rapids, Michigan, U.S.: Zondervan. ISBN 978-0-310-28604-2.
- Horton, Michael (2011b), For Calvinism, Zondervan Books, ISBN 978-0-310-32465-2
- McGrath, Alister E. (1990), A Life of John Calvin, Oxford: Basil Blackwell, ISBN 0-631-16398-0
- McKim, Donald K. (2001). Introducing the Reformed Faith. Louisville, Kentucky, U.S.: Westminster John Knox Press.
- Montgomery, Daniel; Jones, Timothy Paul (2014). PROOF: Finding Freedom through the Intoxicating Joy of Irresistible Grace. New York: HarperCollins. ISBN 978-0-310-51389-6.
- Muller, Richard A. (2004). "John Calvin and later Calvinism". In Bagchi, David; Steinmetz, David C (eds.). The Cambridge Companion to Reformation Theology. New York: Cambridge University Press. ISBN 978-0-521-77662-2.
- Muller, Richard A. (9 November 1993). Confessing the Reformed Faith: Our Identity in Unity and Diversity. North American Presbyterian and Reformed Council. Escondido, California, U.S.: Westminster Seminary California. Archived from the original on 1 July 2015.
- Olmstead, Clifton E. (1960). History of Religion in the United States. Englewood Cliffs, New Jersey: Prentice-Hall.
- Parker, T. H. L. (2006), John Calvin: A Biography, Oxford: Lion Hudson plc, ISBN 978-0-7459-5228-4.
- Pettegree, Andrew (2004), "The spread of Calvin's thought", in McKim, Donald K. (ed.), The Cambridge Companion to John Calvin, Cambridge: Cambridge University Press, ISBN 978-0-521-01672-8
- Stephens, W. P. (1986), The Theology of Huldrych Zwingli, Oxford: Clarendon Press, ISBN 0-19-826677-4.
- Stroup, George W. (1996). Reformed Reader. Vol. 2. Louisville, Kentucky, U.S.: Westminster/John Knox Press.
- Stroup, George W. (2003). "Reformed Identity in an Ecumenical World". In Alston, Wallace M. Jr.; Welker, Michael (eds.). Reformed Theology: Identity and Ecumenicity. Grand Rapids, Michigan, U.S.: William B. Eerdmans Publishing Company. pp. 257–270.
- VanDrunen, David (Autumn 2007), "The Two Kingdoms Doctrine and the Relationship of Church and State in the Early Reformed Tradition", Journal of Church and State, 49 (4), KC library: 743–63, doi:10.1093/jcs/49.4.743 – via EBSCO (subscription required).
- Weisse, Wolfram; Anthonissen, Carel Aaron (2004). Maintaining Apartheid Or Promoting Change?: The Role of the Dutch Reformed Church in a Phase of Increasing Conflict in South Africa. Waxmann Verlag.
- Westminster Confession of Faith . 1646 – via Wikisource.
