= Lay preacher =

Preacher who is not a member of the clergy

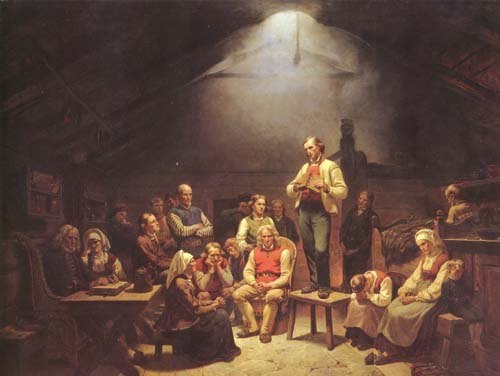
A lay preacher at a nineteenth-century Haugean conventicle.

A lay preacher is a preacher who is not ordained (i.e. a layperson) and who may not hold a formal university degree in theology. Lay preaching varies in importance between religions and their sects.

== Overview ==
Some denominations specifically discourage or disallow lay ministers or lay preachers from assuming certain titles. For example, the Unitarian Universalist Association reserves the title of "the reverend" for ordained ministers.

The United Methodist Church authorized the role of "certified lay minister" (CLM) at its 2004 General Conference as a non-clergy leadership role, stating that CLMs should not use the title of "pastor"; be addressed as "reverend"; or wear clerical garb (i.e., the robe, stole or collar).

Lay ecclesial ministry is a similar practice in the Catholic Church. Lay ecclesial ministers serve the church in many ways, assisting priests, but are not ordained.

== Examples of lay preachership ==
Specific groups of lay preachers, and other groups that encourage lay preachership, include:

- Awakening (Lutheran movement; especially see Hans Nielsen Hauge, Paavo Ruotsalainen, and lay preachers organized by Lars Levi Laestadius)
- Methodist local preachers (Great Britain)
- Lay readers, also called licensed lay ministers (Anglicanism)
- Lay speakers (United Methodist Church)
- Plymouth Brethren
- United Reformed Church preachers (Great Britain)
- Unitarian and Free Christian accredited preachers (Great Britain)

== See also ==
- Lay presidency, celebrating the Lord's Supper while unordained
- Lay brother (lay sister)
- Lay leader
- Practicing without a license
- Priesthood of all believers
- Universal priesthood
