= Lay leader =

A lay leader is a member of the laity in any congregation who has been chosen as a leader either by their peers or the leadership of the congregation. In most denominations, lay leadership is not an ordained clerical office, and the lay leader's responsibilities vary according to the particular tradition of the congregation. Some organizations do not allow the lay leader to give sacraments for example, but do allow them to perform most other portions of the service that are normally the responsibility of the clergy (e.g. giving sermons when the regular clergy are on vacation).

== By denomination ==
The Assemblies of God official position paper on Ordination states, "When necessary, the laity can perform all of the functions of ministry except those for which the State requires an ordained minister."

In the United Methodist Church the lay leader refers to the principal layperson in a local church, district or Annual Conference who represents and leads the laity in ministry. It is an elected position, and the lay leader will serve on most church committees.

Various titles are used for lay leaders in different religious organizations, including lay preacher; lay reader (in Episcopal churches); lay speaker (in the United Methodist Church, USA); local preacher (in the UK Methodist Church and the Uniting Church in Australia); Reader (in the Anglican Church); and deacon, though this last title can also refer to an ordained ministry.

The Unitarian & Free Christian Churches of Great Britain have Accredited Lay Preachers who take services including rites of passage.

== Responsibilities ==
The following list gives examples of things lay leaders may be responsible for:

- acting as ushers
- acting as liturgists
- making announcements
- reading scripture
- offering sermons
- conducting a complete service
- serving or chairing church committees
- congregational advocate and liaison

== See also ==
- Lay speaker (United Methodist Church)
