= Priesthood of all believers =

Christian doctrine

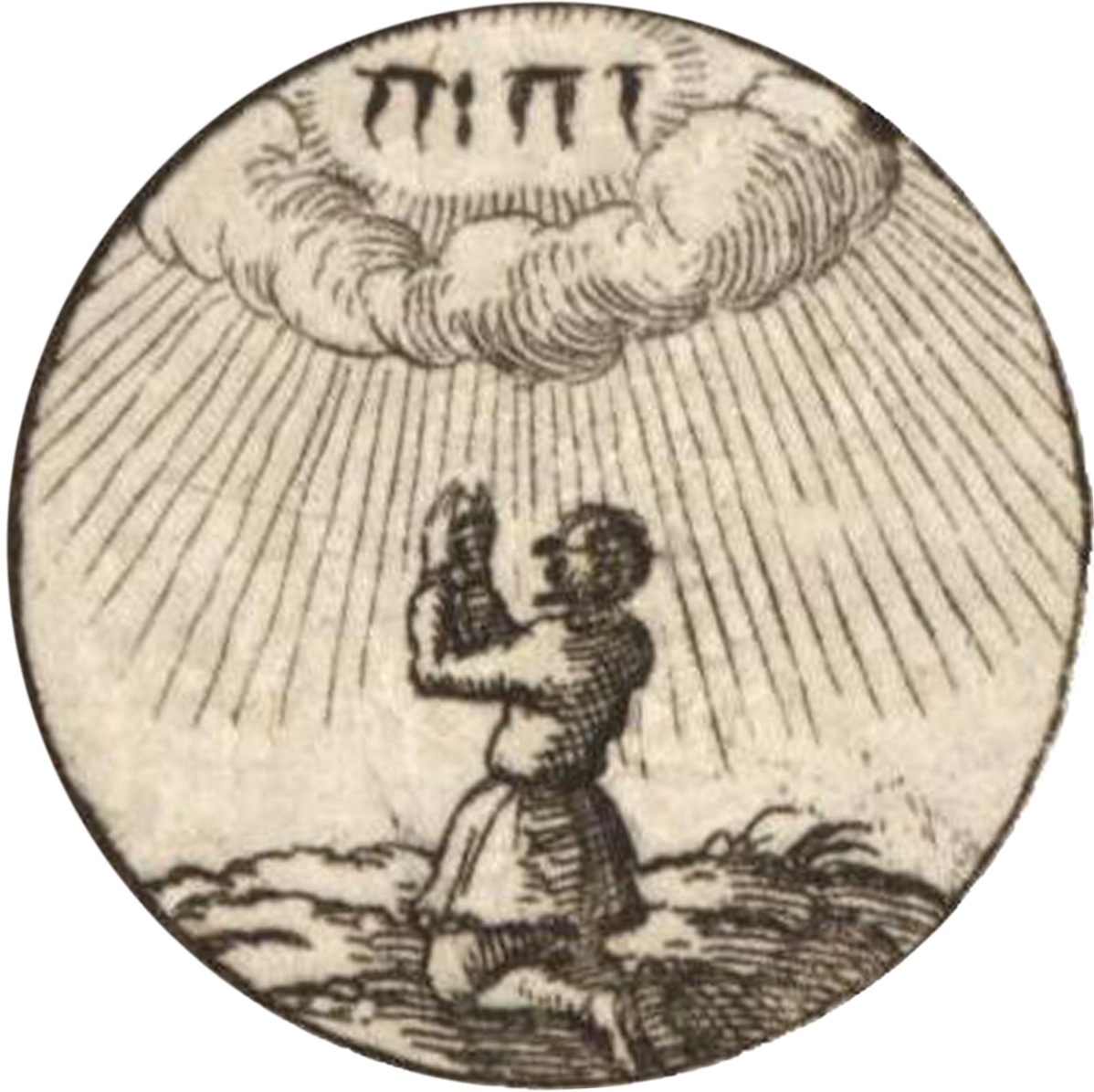
"Scripture [...] sets before us Christ alone as mediator, atoning sacrifice, high priest, and intercessor."—Augsburg Confession Art. XXI.

The priesthood of all believers is a concept of a 'common priesthood' of many Christians (a concept broadly accepted by some churches), while the term can also refer to a specific Protestant understanding that this universal priesthood precludes the ministerial priesthood (i.e., holy orders) found in some other churches, including Catholicism and Eastern Orthodoxy.

The exclusionary version, elaborated in the theology of Martin Luther, Ulrich Zwingli and John Calvin among other reformers, became prominent as a tenet of Protestant Christian doctrine, though the exact meaning of the belief and its implications vary widely among denominations.

== Antiquity ==
Hebrew Old Testament texts speak of a national "kingdom of priests" (Exodus 19:5–6), Levites (Exodus 40:15, Leviticus 21:10), (Note: In ancient Israel, priests acted as mediators between God and people. They ministered according to God's instruction and offered sacrifices to God on behalf of the people. Once a year, the high priest would enter the holiest part of the temple and offer a sacrifice for the sins of all the people, including all the priests.) and specific priests (e.g. Genesis 14:18–20). Some issue of illegitimate priestly activity is found in the story of the "schism of Korah" (Numbers 16:1-40).

The Odes of Solomon (c. AD 70-120) has an early understanding of a view of the priesthood of all believers, suggesting that Jewish-Christians in the region of Antioch believed themselves to be priests of God making spiritual sacrifices. (Note: "In a hymn now known as Ode 20, the poet describes his understanding of the "priesthood of all believers": ..... Ode 20 demonstrates that first century Jewish-Christians in the region of Antioch perceived themselves as individual priests offering spiritual sacrifices." Voss, Henry Joseph (2016-10-25). The Priesthood of All Believers and the Missio Dei: A Canonical, Catholic, and Contextual Perspective. Wipf and Stock Publishers. ISBN 978-1-4982-8329-8.) Tertullian held a belief similar to the priesthood of all believers. However his views on the laity may have been influenced by Montanism, as the Montanists supposedly believed in the priesthood of every believer.

Irenaeus has been argued to have held to a view of universal priesthood because he stated "for all the righteous possess the sacerdotal rank". For St Augustine, baptism (including infant baptism) was an ordination into Christ’s royal priesthood. In his exposition of 1 Peter 2:9, he writes ‘we call them all priest insomuch as they are members of the One Priest’. (Note: "The responsibility of all those who were baptised is to offer their lives to God. Augustine deﬁnes the royal priesthood’s ‘true sacriﬁces’ as ‘works of mercy done to ourselves or our neighbour and directed to God.’" apud Dreyer)

In the millennium from the 6th to 16th centuries, this common priesthood was sometimes overshadowed, to some extent, by the influence of Pseudo-Dionysius the Areopagite's book Celestial Hierarchy, which was widely believed then to be a second-century and near-apostolic teaching, that appropriated a pagan multi-level schema to make a hierarchical description of Christianity with a succession of intermediaries (energies, names, angels, priests, etc.) between God and man.

== Catholic view ==
The Catholic Church teaches a version of the priesthood of all believers. The dogmatic constitution Lumen gentium of the Second Vatican Council specifically highlights the priesthood of all believers. The primary difference between the teachings of the Catholic Church and those of the Protestant churches that reject the ordained priesthood, is that the Catholic Church believes in three different types of Christian priests:

1. the common priesthood of all Christians (1 Peter 2:5–9)
2. the ordained priesthood (Acts 14:23, Romans 15:16, 1 Timothy 5:17, Titus 1:5, James 5:14–15); and
3. the high priesthood of Jesus (Hebrews 3:1) (Note: Who is unique as both "the one who sacrifices and the one who is sacrificed.")

Christian priesthood is not a continuation of Jewish temple priests who sacrifice animals but, like Christ, a priesthood in the order of Melchizedek who "offered bread and wine". The first two priesthoods are a participation in Christ's priesthood:

"The redemptive sacrifice of Christ is unique, accomplished once for all; yet it is made present in the Eucharistic sacrifice of the Church. The same is true of the one priesthood of Christ; it is made present through the ministerial priesthood without diminishing the uniqueness of Christ's priesthood: "Only Christ is the true priest, the others being only his ministers.""

— Catechism of the Catholic Church, 1454 with quote of Aquinas

Catholicism often expresses the idea of the priesthood of all baptized Christians in English as the "common" or "universal" priesthood; in parallel, it refers to Catholic clergy as the "ministerial" priesthood. It defends this distinction with the original language of scripture. The Catholic Church holds that the consecration of the eucharist and absolution from sin may only be validly performed by ministerial priests with true apostolic succession.

Orthodox churches have a similar view to the Catholic view.

== Protestant views ==
The universal priesthood of all believers which excludes a ministerial priesthood is a foundational concept of Protestantism. (Note: "Protestantism originated in the 16th-century Reformation, and its basic doctrines, in addition to those of the ancient Christian creeds, are justification by grace alone through faith, the priesthood of all believers, and the supremacy of Holy Scripture in matters of faith and order." "The Protestant Heritage" Encyclopædia Britannica. 2007. Encyclopædia Britannica Online. 20 Sept. 2007 "The Protestant Heritage -- Encyclopędia Britannica". Archived from the original on 2006-06-14.) Some Protestant traditions, including Anglican and Lutheran churches, retain the office of bishop.

=== Anglican ===
Anglican churches ordain priests and deacons. However, opinions about what happens at ordination vary, and ordination is sometimes, although not always, considered a sacrament.

"There are two Sacraments ordained of Christ our Lord in the Gospel, that is to say, Baptism, and the Supper of the Lord. Those five commonly called Sacraments, that is to say, Confirmation, Penance, Orders, Matrimony, and extreme Unction, are not to be counted for Sacraments of the Gospel, being such as have grown partly of the corrupt following of the Apostles, partly are states of life allowed in the Scriptures; but yet have not like nature of Sacraments with Baptism, and the Lord’s Supper, for that they have not any visible sign or ceremony ordained of God."

— Thirty Nine Articles, article XXV.

=== Lutheranism ===
While Martin Luther did not use the phrase "priesthood of all believers", he adduces a general priesthood in Christendom in his 1520 To the Christian Nobility of the German Nation in order to dismiss the medieval view that Christians in the present life were to be divided into two classes: "spiritual" and "secular". He put forward the doctrine that all baptized Christians are "priests" and "spiritual" in the sight of God:

That the pope or bishop anoints, makes tonsures, ordains, consecrates, or dresses differently from the laity, may make a hypocrite or an idolatrous oil-painted icon, but it in no way makes a Christian or spiritual human being. In fact, we are all consecrated priests through Baptism, as St. Peter in 1 Peter 2[:9] says, "You are a royal priesthood and a priestly kingdom," and Revelation [5:10], "Through your blood you have made us into priests and kings."

Two months later Luther would write in his On the Babylonian Captivity of the Church (1520):

How then if they are forced to admit that we are all equally priests, as many of us as are baptized, and by this way we truly are; while to them is committed only the Ministry (ministerium) and consented to by us (nostro consensu)? If they recognize this they would know that they have no right to exercise power over us (ius imperii, in what has not been committed to them) except insofar as we may have granted it to them, for thus it says in 1 Peter 2, "You are a chosen race, a royal priesthood, a priestly kingdom." In this way we are all priests, as many of us as are Christians. There are indeed priests whom we call ministers. They are chosen from among us, and who do everything in our name. That is a priesthood which is nothing else than the Ministry. Thus 1 Corinthians 4:1: "No one should regard us as anything else than ministers of Christ and dispensers of the mysteries of God."

The belief in the priesthood of all believers does not preclude order, authority or discipline within congregations or denominational organizations. For example, Lutheranism maintains the doctrine of "the preaching office" or the "office of the holy ministry" established by God in the Christian Church. The Augsburg Confession states:

[From Article 5:] To obtain such (saving) faith God instituted the office of preaching, giving the gospel and the sacraments. Through these, as through means, he gives the Holy Spirit who produces faith, where and when he wills, in those who hear the gospel ... [Article 14:] Concerning church government it is taught that no one should publicly teach, preach, or administer the sacraments without a proper [public] call.

=== Nonconformists ===
The doctrine is strongly asserted within Methodism and the Plymouth Brethren movement. Within Methodism it can plausibly be linked to the strong emphasis on social action and political involvement within that denomination, and can be seen in the role of local preachers and lay speakers in Methodist churches. Within the Plymouth Brethren, the concept is most usually evidenced in the lack of distinction between "clergy" and "laity", the refusal to adopt formal titles such as reverend or bishop, the denial of formal ordination, and in some cases the refusal to hire any "professional staff" or paid Christian workers at all.

Baptists, who generally operate on a form of congregational polity, also lean on this concept. The Laestadian pietist movement has a specific interpretation of the doctrine as underlying its solemn rite concerning the declaration of the forgiveness of sins. British Quakers (Religious Society of Friends) have no priests and no order of service; they believe God can speak through any person present, and any planned service is at risk of getting in God's way, hence the bulk of the observance is in silence.

Some groups during the Reformation believed that priesthood authority was still needed but was lost from the earth. American Puritan Roger Williams believed, "There is no regularly constituted church of Christ on earth, nor any person qualified to administer any church ordinances; nor can there be until new apostles are sent by the Great Head of the Church for whose coming I am seeking." The Seekers, believed that the Roman Catholic Church had lost its authority through corruption and waited for Christ to restore his true church and authority.

The vast majority of Protestants draw some distinction between their own ordained ministers and lay people. Pastors and ordained ministers are usually regarded as congregational leaders and theologians who are well versed with Christian liturgy, scripture, and church teachings, and are qualified to lead worship and preach sermons. Although many religions use priests, most Protestant denominations reject the idea of a priesthood as a group that is spiritually distinct from lay people. They typically employ professional clergy who perform many of the same functions as priests such as clarifying doctrine, administering communion, performing baptisms, marriages, etc. In many instances, Protestants see professional clergy as servants acting on behalf of the local believers. This is in contrast to the priest, whom some Protestants see as having a distinct authority and spiritual role different from that of ordinary believers.

=== Democratic churches ===
Luther's doctrine of the universal priesthood of all believers gave laypersons and the clergy equal rights and responsibilities. It had strong, far-reaching consequences both within the Protestant churches and outside of them with respect to the development of distinct political and societal structures.

Luther had the intention to organize the church in such a way as to give the members of a congregation the right to elect a pastor by majority-decision and, if necessary, to dismiss him again. The Lutheran church would get an institutional framework based on the majoritarian principle, the central characteristic of democracy. But mainly because of the strong political and military pressure from the Catholic powers, the developing Lutheran churches in the German territories had to seek the protection of their worldly rulers who turned them into state churches. In the Scandinavian countries, Lutheran state churches were established, too.

John Calvin put Luther's intended democratic church polity into effect. The church members elected lay elders from their midst who, together with pastors, teachers, and deacons, were also elected by the parishioners, formed the representative church leadership. To this presbyterian polity, the Huguenots added regional synods and a national synod, whose members, laymen and clergymen alike, were elected by the parishioners as well. This combination of presbyteries and synods was taken over by all Reformed churches, except the Congregationalists who had no synods.

When Lutherans from Germany and Scandinavia emigrated to North America, they took over the church polity based on presbyteries and synods which had been developed by the denominations with Calvinist traditions (for example, Lutheran Church–Missouri Synod). In Germany, Lutheran churches established the first presbyteries in the 19th century, and after the downfall of the monarchies in 1918 synods were formed which assumed the task of leading the churches. They are made up of both laypersons and clergy. Since 1919, the Anglican church has also had a synod (National Assembly), which has elected laypersons among its members.

It is a featured doctrine of Restorationist churches, such as the Churches of Christ.

=== North American Pilgrims ===
The Separatist Congregationalists (Pilgrim Fathers) who founded Plymouth Colony in North America in 1620 took the next step in evolving the consequences of Luther's universal priesthood doctrine by combining it with the federal theology that had been developed by Calvinist theologians, especially Robert Browne, Henry Barrowe, and John Greenwood. On the basis of the Mayflower Compact, a social contract, the Pilgrims applied the principles that guided their congregational democracy also to the administration of the worldly affairs of their community. It was, like Massachusetts Bay Colony, founded by Puritans in 1628, de facto a small democratic, self-governing republic until 1691, when the two colonies were united under a royal governor. Both colonies had a representative political structure and practiced separation of powers. The General Court functioned as the legislative and the judiciary, the annually elected governor and his assistants were the executive branch of government. These Protestants believed that democracy was the will of God. In so doing, they followed Calvin who had, in order to safeguard the rights and liberties of ordinary people, praised the advantages of democracy and recommended that political power should be distributed among several institutions to minimise its misuse. He had in effect advocated separation of powers.

In Rhode Island (1636), Connecticut (1636), and Pennsylvania (1682), Baptist Roger Williams, Congregationalist Thomas Hooker, and Quaker William Penn, respectively, gave the democratic concept another turn by linking it with religious freedom, a basic human right that had its origin also in Luther's theology. In this view, faith in Jesus Christ was a gift of the Holy Spirit and could therefore not be forced on a person. Williams, Hooker, and Penn adopted Luther's position. Precondition for granting freedom of conscience in their colonies was the separation of church and state. This had been made possible by Luther's separation of the spiritual and the worldly spheres in his doctrine of the two kingdoms. The inseparable combination of democracy with its civil rights on the one hand and religious freedom and other human rights on the other hand became the backbone of the American Declaration of Independence (1776), Constitution, and Bill of Rights. In turn, these documents became models for the constitutions of nations in Europe, Latin America, and other parts of the world. The French Declaration of the Rights of Man and of the Citizen (1789) was mainly based on the draft of Marquis de Lafayette, an ardent supporter of the American constitutional principles. These are also echoed in the United Nations Charter and Declaration of Human Rights.

A practical example of the priesthood of all believers may be found in modern Anabaptist churches, such as the Amish, Bruderhof and Hutterites. While these groups appoint leaders, it is held that all members are responsible for the functioning of the church and church meetings. For example, at the Bruderhof, meetings are held with members sitting in a circle, breaking down the tradition of "preacher" and "congregation".

=== Priesthood of each believer ===
The phrase "Priesthood of each believer" has been used to express the teaching that this priesthood is not collective or participatory but entirely individual, especially in, as a Southern Baptist has expressed, "a congregation of faithful believers united in a common confession working as priests to each other."

=== Priesthood of no believers ===
Commentators sometimes use the phrase "Priesthood of no believers" for example for democratized Protestant groups where there are no clergy, or in churches which have purely symbolic, or no, sacraments, or which do not make a distinction between religions. Some Lutheran theologians have pushed back on idea that the priesthood of all believers entails a democratic leveling of offices:

Luther's text "cannot mean, "anyone can be a pastor," but rather, "all of us are members of the one body of Christ and individually servants to each other in our respective offices." The Protestant and pietistic appropriation of these terms turns everything on its head and replaces service with power-grabbing and the unity of Christ's body with the disunity of individualistic spirituality. Or, as my friend Paul Rorem puts it, the democratic, American misconstrual of the priesthood of all believers means in actuality the priesthood of no believers."

— Timothy J. Wengert, The Priesthood of All Believers and Other Pious Myths

This expression has also been used for households without heads and for mutually-indifferent Christians.

== Theology ==
The Bible passage considered to be the basis of this belief is 1 Peter 2:9:

But you are not like that, for you are a chosen people. You are royal priests, a holy nation, God’s very own possession. As a result, you can show others the goodness of God, for he called you out of the darkness into his wonderful light.

(This New Living Translation version reflects the Protestant view, as the universal "royal priesthood" from the Bible Luther cites above has been changed to individual "royal priests".) Other relevant Scripture passages include Exodus 19:5–6, 1 Peter 2:4–9, Revelation 1:4–6, Revelation 5:6–10, Revelation 20:6 and the Epistle to the Hebrews.

Most Protestants today recognize only Christ as a mediator between themselves and God (1 Timothy 2:5). The Epistle to the Hebrews calls Jesus the supreme "high priest," who offered himself as a perfect sacrifice (Hebrews 7:23–28). Protestants believe that through Christ they have been given direct access to God, just like a priest; thus the doctrine is called the priesthood of all believers. God is equally accessible to all the faithful, and every Christian has equal potential to minister for God. This doctrine stands in opposition to the concept of a spiritual aristocracy or hierarchy within Christianity.

Much of the doctrinal dispute on this matter is caused by the difference between the Greek words ἱερεύς (hiereus meaning "sacred one"; represented in Latin by the word sacerdos) and πρεσβύτερος (presbyteros meaning "one with elderhood"), which are usually both translated in English with the word "priest". The former term refers to the sacrificial ritual leaders of Judaism, the kohanim (כֹּהֲנִים), and to those holding the office of conducting sacrifices in ancient pagan temples, whereas the latter term refers to an acknowledged elder of a community.

== See also ==
- Lay preacher
