= Thomas Maxfield (Methodist) =

English Methodist preacher (died 1784)

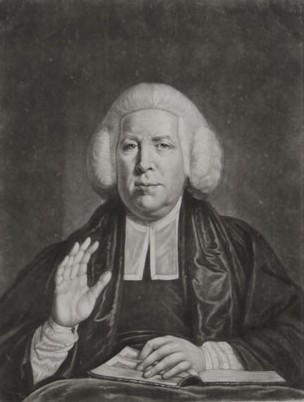
Thomas Maxfield, 1772 engraving

Thomas Maxfield (died 1784) was an English Wesleyan Methodist preacher. He was one of the earliest local preachers and began preaching in 1739. After a time in the army, he was ordained as a minister. After separating from John Wesley's movement in 1763, Maxfield led his own church. The two later reconciled on a personal level, but Maxfield never rejoined the Methodists.

== Life ==
Maxfield was a native of Bristol from a poor background. He was converted by John Wesley during his first visit to the city, on 1 May 1739. In March 1740 he was travelling with Charles Wesley, and remained with him for a period. In 1742, when Wesley left London, he gave Maxfield the charge of the Foundery Society, directing him to pray with the members and give them suitable advice. Maxfield soon passed from praying to preaching, and Lady Huntingdon, who was an attendant at the chapel, was impressed by his talents. Others complained to Wesley that Maxfield had usurped the sacred office without being called to it. Wesley came back to London, where his mother mollified his anger. After Wesley heard Maxfield he decided the dispute was in his favour.

In June 1745, while preaching in Cornwall, Maxfield was pressed for the navy. The captain to whom he was taken refused to have him on board, and he was imprisoned at Penzance. Through the intervention of the Rev. William Borlase of Ludgvan, who was hostile to the Methodists, he was handed over to the military authorities. Wesley, who was preaching nearby, attended the meeting of the justices at Marazion, by whom Maxfield was handed to the military. He served in the army for several years. After his discharge he was at Wesley's request ordained at Bath, Somerset by William Barnard, bishop of Derry. From this time he was one of Wesley's main assistants, as well as an assistant chaplain to the Countess of Huntingdon.

Maxfield, however, was a divisive figure. He encouraged those who saw visions. At the conference of 1761 Maxfield silenced opponents, but Wesley wrote to him subsequently about the complaints made. At the beginning of 1762 Wesley still had concerns, and John William Fletcher had serious criticisms. In the course of the year the problem became more acute. Maxfield had adopted a prediction made by George Bell, a fellow-minister, sharing his opinion that the world would end on 28 February 1763. Wesley preached against him on 23 January, but with little effect. A schism became inevitable, and in February 1763 Maxfield practically told Wesley "You take too much upon you". On 28 April he finally broke with Wesley, taking Bell and about two hundred others with him.

Maxfield was now chosen preacher by a society in Snow's Fields, moving two or three years later to Ropemakers' Alley, Moorfields. There he had a large congregation. He finally set up in Princes Street, Moorfields, where he preached till about 1767. From the time of his secession Maxfield was hostile to Wesley. In February 1770 he met Wesley once more at the Countess of Huntingdon's house in Portland Row, where he preached against the doctrine of Christian perfection, which he had formerly upheld. Two years later he professed to desire a reunion. Wesley saw him, but confidence was not restored.

In 1778 Maxfield published a pamphlet charging the Wesleys with turning the hearts of the people from George Whitefield during his absence in America, and John Wesley replied with A Letter to the Rev. Thomas Maxfield, occasioned by a late Publication. In 1779 there was more talk of reunion, but Charles Wesley insisted that an acknowledgment of fault on Maxfield's side was needed. Wesley expressed personal affection for him, but nothing came of the negotiations. Wesley did visit Maxfield in his last illness, and preached in his chapel.

Maxfield died at his house in Moorfields on 18 March 1784.

== Works ==
Maxfield published:

- A Short Account of Mr. Murgetroyd during the Last Month of his Life, Bath, 1771.
- A Short Account of the Particular Circumstances of the Life and Death of William Davies, who was Executed 11 Dec. 1776, with his Speech at Tyburn, London, 1776.
- A Short Account of God's Dealings with Mrs. Elizabeth Maxfield (his wife), 1778. This contains three letters to her from George Whitefield, dated 16 January 1738, 16 November 1738 (from Kilrush), and 3 November 1739 (Philadelphia).
- A Short Account of the Circumstances that Happened the Last Seven Days before the Death of T. Sherwood, 1778.

Also A Collection of Psalms and Hymns extracted from various Authors, 1778; and a sermon, Christ the Great Gift of God and the Nature of Faith in Him, 1769.

== Family ==
Maxfield married Elizabeth Branford, a lady of means, who was one of Whitefield's earliest followers. She died on 23 November 1777, and left a family.

== Notes ==
Attribution

This article incorporates text from a publication now in the public domain: Lee, Sidney, ed. (1894). "Maxfield, Thomas (d.1784)". Dictionary of National Biography. Vol. 37. London: Smith, Elder & Co.
