= Sarah Mallett =

British minister

Sarah Mallett (1764–1846) was one of the very small group of women authorised by John Wesley to become a preacher, in the early days of Methodism.

After Wesley's death in 1791, she married, and as Sarah Boyce, she continued to preach for another forty years - despite the ban on female preaching, imposed by the Wesleyan Methodist Church in 1803. She lived in Norfolk, England, and preached widely around the county. After the death of her husband she travelled with another female preacher, Martha Grigson, which enabled her to preach both in London and Birmingham.

Further details are available in her biography, My Dear Sally by David East (first edition published by World Methodist Historical Society Publications in May 2003, second revised edition published by the author on Blurb, May 2012).

== See also ==
- Sarah Crosby
