= Shirley Guthrie =

American Presbyterian minister and author

Shirley C. Guthrie Jr. (9 October 1927 – 23 October 2004) was a minister of the Presbyterian Church (USA) and J.B. Green Professor of Systematic Theology at Columbia Theological Seminary for nearly 40 years. He was well known for his book, Christian Doctrine, which was originally written for an Adult Sunday School Book in the old PCUS Covenant life curriculum.

== Career ==
Guthrie was born in Texas as the son of a Presbyterian minister. He studied first at Princeton Theological Seminary, and earned his doctorate at the University of Basel, where Karl Barth directed his PhD dissertation on Reinhold Niebuhr. He briefly served as the minister of the Presbyterian Church in Rusk, Texas. His Christian Doctrine is a standard seminary text, which is also published in Japanese, Korean, Spanish, Taiwanese, and many other languages. His book Christian Doctrine, which includes Barthian perspective, influenced Presbyterian Church (USA) to have their commitment to social justice and its participation in the social and political issues of the day. Walter Brueggemann and George Stroup edited Many Voices, One God, a festschrift in his honor in 1998.

== Publications ==
- Always Being Reformed: Faith for a Fragmented World. Westminster John Knox Press; 2 edition, January 21, 2008.
- Christian Doctrine. Westminster John Knox Press; Revised, Subsequent edition, July 1, 1994. ISBN 978-0664253684
- Diversity in Faith-Unity in Christ. Westminster John Knox Press, November 1, 1986. ISBN 978-0664240134
- The Heidelberg Catechism for Today, Karl Barth, Translated by Jr. Shirley C. Guthrie. John Knox Press, 1964.
