= The Foundery =

London foundry for casting brass cannon

Coordinates: 51.5223°N 0.0864°W

Lithograph by H. Humphreys, c. 1830

The Foundery (or Foundry), in Moorfields, was the first London foundry for casting brass cannon for the British Board of Ordnance. The building subsequently served as the first Wesleyan Methodist house of worship, and an important meeting place for the early Methodist community. In 1778, the Methodist congregation was moved to the nearby purpose-built Wesley's Chapel on City Road.

== History ==
=== Cannon foundry ===
Matthew Bagley had the foundry built c. 1684 in Windmill Hill (now Tabernacle Street), Moorfields on the north side of the City of London. It was called the King's Foundery or Bagley's Foundry.

Bagley was from a family of master-founders in Chacombe, Northamptonshire. By 1693 he was also running a bell-foundry in Clerkenwell, London. He is sometimes referred to as "Matthew II Bagley", to distinguish him from earlier and later bell-founders of the same name from the same family.

The Foundery supplied cannons for the nearby Honourable Artillery Company. It was closed in 1716 after a steam explosion, caused by dampness in a mould, which killed Bagley and 16 others. A new cannon foundry was opened (c. 1717) on the Board of Ordnance's Woolwich site southeast of London.

=== Wesleyan chapel ===
The building was later used from 1739 as the first Methodist chapel in London by John Wesley (a plaque in Tabernacle Street marks the nearby location). Wesley purchased the building's lease for £115, then spent a further £700–£800 on refurbishment costs, creating a chapel with room for 1,500 people, plus a smaller meeting room. Wesley first preached in the building on 11 November 1739, and another leading Methodist Thomas Maxfield was there in 1742. This first Methodist chapel hosted the first Methodist conference in June 1744.

The Foundery complex also provided a free dispensary which opened in 1746 and the Methodists appointed an apothecary and a surgeon. The following year there was a free school with two masters teaching 60 children. In 1747 the complex gained a lending society and in 1748 there was an adjacent almshouse.

The Methodist Society moved to the nearby purpose-built Wesley's Chapel in 1778.
