= Methodist local preacher =

Layperson accredited by the Methodist Church to lead worship and preach

A Methodist local preacher is a layperson who has been accredited by the Methodist Church to lead worship and preach on a frequent basis. With separation from the Church of England by the end of the 18th century, a clear distinction was recognised between itinerant preachers (later, ministers) and the local preachers who assisted them. Local preachers have played an important role in Methodism since the earliest days of the movement, and have also been important in English social history. These preachers continue to serve an indispensable role in the Methodist Church of Great Britain, in which the majority of church services are led by laypeople. In certain Methodist connexions, a person becomes a local preacher after obtaining a license to preach. In many parts of Methodism, such as the Allegheny Wesleyan Methodist Connection, there are thus two different tiers of ministers—licensed preachers and ordained elders.

== Historical background ==
Local preachers have been a characteristic of Methodism from its beginnings as a revival movement in 18th-century England. John Wesley tried to avoid a schism with the Church of England, and encouraged those who attended his revival meetings to attend their parish churches, but they also attended Methodist preaching services which were held elsewhere and met in "classes" (small cell groups). It quickly became necessary to build "preaching houses" where the Methodist meetings could be held. These began to function as alternative churches, often depending on the attitude of the local Anglican clergy.

One such preaching house was The Foundery, which served as Wesley's base in London. In about 1740, Wesley was away on business and had left a young man, Thomas Maxfield, in charge of The Foundery. Since no clergymen were available, Maxfield took it upon himself to preach to the congregation. Wesley was annoyed by this and returned to London in order to confront Maxfield. However, his mother, Susanna Wesley, persuaded him to hear Maxfield out, suggesting that he had as much right to preach as Wesley. Wesley was sufficiently impressed by Maxfield's preaching to see it as God's work and let the matter drop, with Maxfield becoming one of Methodism's earliest lay preachers.

Methodism formally broke with the Anglican church as a result of Wesley's 1784 ordination of ministers to serve in the United States following the American War of Independence. Before the schism, Wesley had as accredited preachers only a handful of fellow Anglican priests who shared his view of the need to take the gospel to the people where they were. Because of their small number, these priests were necessarily itinerant, travelling around the country like Wesley himself. Their travelling pattern, like that used until the mid 20th century by judges, gave rise to the use of the word circuit to describe a group of churches overseen by a single minister; this word is still in use today.

Because of the limited number of ordained ministers he could call on, Wesley appointed local preachers who were not ordained but whom he examined, and whom he felt he could trust to lead worship and preach: though not to minister sacraments.

As the independent Methodist Church developed following the schism and Wesley's death, a pattern was soon established in which ordained ministers, whose number was still limited, were attached for a short period (at first three years, subsequently five, and now more usually seven or more) to a circuit. The circuit minister had pastoral oversight and administered sacraments, but the majority of services were led – and sermons preached – by laypersons. Local preachers would regularly spend a whole day with a local church (called a Society), leading one or more services and undertaking pastoral visiting. Many travelled significant distances in the course of a day, often on foot.

In its essentials, this pattern has remained in British Methodism to the present day. Although by the end of the 19th century most circuits were staffed by several ministers, there were almost always more churches in the circuit than ministers, many of them offering two or three services every Sunday. The need for local preachers has never declined and in many circuits an active local preacher may well be involved in preparing and leading worship on seven or eight occasions in a thirteen-week quarter.

== Women as local preachers ==
Methodism has always acknowledged and valued the ministry of women, a Wesleyan influence going back to Susanna Wesley herself. In early British Methodism, a number of women served as local preachers (the heroine of George Eliot's Adam Bede is represented as one). The Methodist Church of Great Britain recognizes Mary Bosanquet-Fletcher (1739-1815) as the first female Methodist preacher. Methodism itself was subject to schism giving rise, in England, to several Methodist connexions including the Primitive Methodists and the Bible Christians as well as the majority Wesleyan Methodist Church. The separated denominations went much further than the Wesleyans in making use of women as local preachers and as ordained ministers. In Wesleyan Methodism from 1803, women were restricted to addressing women-only meetings. This restriction meant that women preachers in Wesleyan Methodism found it increasingly difficult to exercise their ministry and even though in 1804 the Wesleyan Conference was very short of male preachers, it would not sanction the use of women. Some women, such as Sarah Mallett, however, ignored this ban. From 1910 the blanket ban was repealed, and from 1918 on, Wesleyan Methodism recruited and deployed women local preachers on exactly the same basis as men. When Methodist Union in England took place in 1932, the ordination of women in the separated denominations ceased until 1971, but the equal status of women as local preachers continued.

== Importance of local preachers in English social history ==
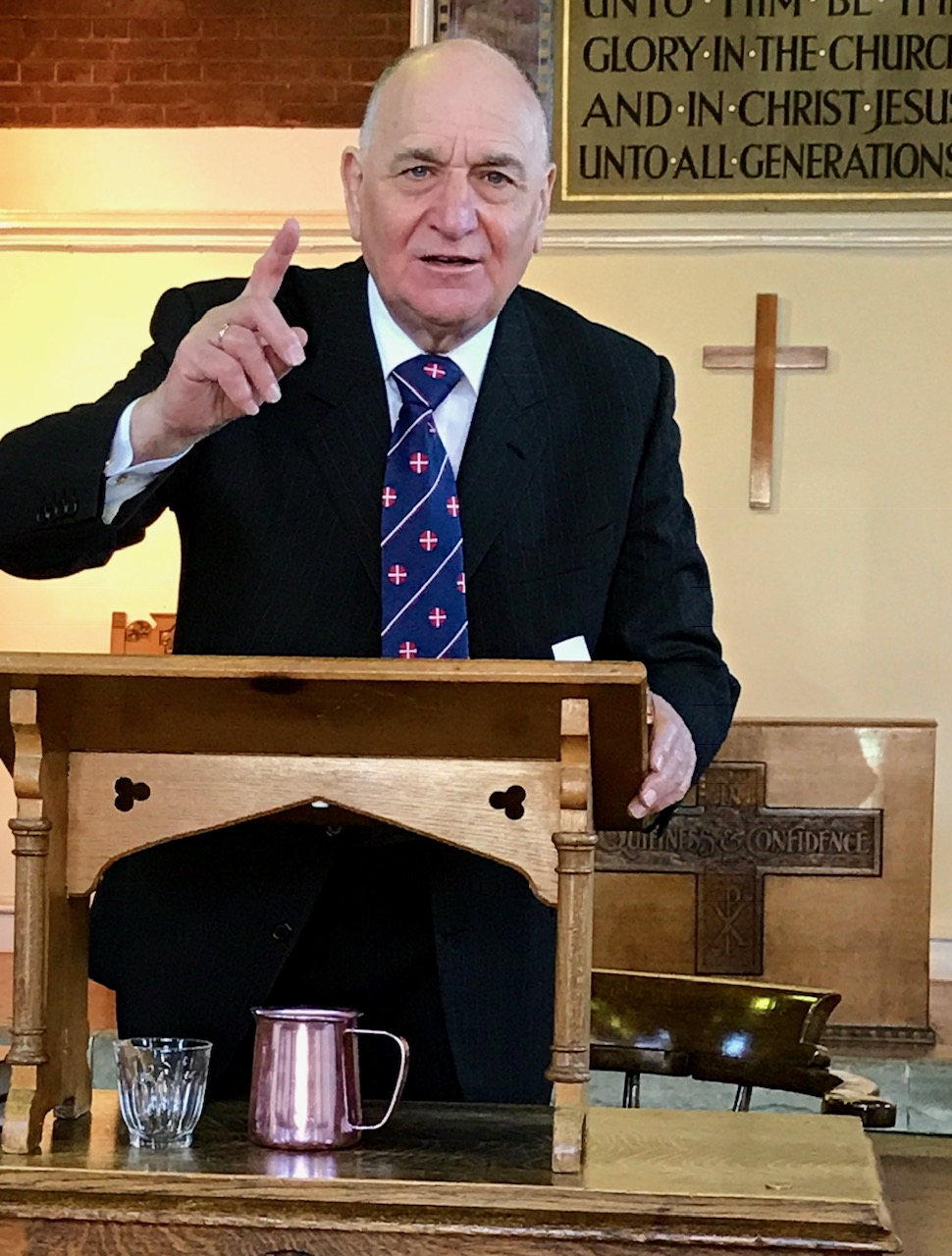
David Hallam leading a service at City Road Methodist Church, Birmingham, 2019

Local preachers have always been required to undergo some form of training and examination – the examination being concerned with their doctrinal orthodoxy as well as with their knowledge of Scripture, and the history and doctrines of the church. Because Methodism had great strength among the lower middle classes and skilled working classes in 19th-century England, training as a local preacher was one of the ways in which intelligent people who had little chance of formal schooling acquired education and an ability at public speaking. Although the church as an institution was by no means politically radical, many of its members were, and the discipline and eloquence of Methodist local preachers found a ready use in the developing labour movement of the later 19th century.

Many of the founders of the trade union movement in Britain were local preachers, including George Loveless, the leader of the Tolpuddle Martyrs. Local preachers continue to be found in the ranks of the Labour movement: prominent recent examples include George Thomas, Speaker of the House of Commons from 1976 to 1983, Len Murray, General Secretary of the Trades Union Congress from 1973 to 1984, David Hallam Member of the European Parliament 1994 to 1999 and, early in his career, David Blunkett, former Home Secretary.

== Discipline, training and accreditation of local preachers today ==
Local preachers, together with their colleagues in the ordained ministry (presbyters and deacons), are members of the Local Preachers' Meeting of the circuit in which their membership is held. The Preachers' Meeting used to meet quarterly, though in many circuits it is now less often. The Meeting is the body which is responsible for the training and development of local preachers, for their pastoral care in this specific role and also for the discipline (should that be necessary) of its own members. It functions also as a study and fellowship group, and as a focus for continuing development of fully accredited local preachers. The standing of a local preacher, however, is national not local and, for example, is not affected by removal to another church or circuit – though it is always up to the superintendent minister whether any preacher is given any appointments.

Currently, the training for local preachers in Britain consists of a course supported by local tutors, with examination on its content by continuous assessment rather than unseen examination. The course (Worship: Leading and Preaching) is organised on a connexional (national) basis, but all other aspects of the training and examination of preachers are dealt with at the local (circuit) level.

Those offering themselves for training first ask for a note to preach from the superintendent minister of their circuit which is given at their sole discretion and reported to the Preachers' Meeting. The new preacher is then listed as On note, begins a course of study and practical training (which takes between two and five years to complete), and begins to accompany an accredited preacher and share in the leadership of worship.

After some months, provided favourable reports are received at the Circuit Preachers' Meeting, they then progress to being on trial. Local preachers on trial still work at first with an experienced preacher, but in due course they progress to leading worship on their own. The Preachers' Meeting continues to appoint preachers and other local officers to audit their services, make reports and offer guidance. The meeting carries out an oral doctrinal examination at the beginning of training, at intermediate points, and before the final acceptance of the candidate as an accredited preacher. The candidate must also give an account of their call to preach, and are expected to have knowledge of some of the most important of the Sermons of the Rev. John Wesley. Final admission as a local preacher is referred to as being fully accredited or received onto full plan, the Circuit Plan being the schedule of preaching appointments for the circuit. The decision is formally ratified by the Circuit Meeting before it is put into effect. A service of recognition is held, often within the context of a principal act of worship.

Formerly, before changes in 2022, candidates for ordination as a presbyter in the Methodist Church in Great Britain were required to be admitted as local preachers before candidating.

== Local preachers and the liturgy ==
Compared to lay people in some other denominations, Methodist local preachers are accorded significant authority over the progress of a service, for which they are seen as having overall responsibility, rather than just delivering the sermon. A local preacher may, at their discretion, do a number of different things:

- create the order of service;
- omit or include any part of the order of service;
- determine which Bible readings are to be included, which may – but need not – be selected from those defined in the lectionary;
- involve other people in the preparation and leading of the worship

Increasingly, in British Methodism, local preachers accept guidance from the churches to which they go, for example in regular or seasonal local elements of liturgy, or in using those nominated in a rota of readers or prayer leaders. A relatively recent development is the appointment of "worship leaders", who are members of the local church authorised to share in the leading of worship there, though they are not authorised to preach. All preachers and worship leaders are offered additional resources for shaping worship and preaching by their own charity, the Leaders of Worship and Preachers' Trust (LWPT) which publishes a quarterly journal (Ichthus) and has its own website.

== Local preachers worldwide ==
The institution of local preachers spread from the original Wesleyan Methodist Church to the other Methodist connexions that developed in Britain; and from Britain to Methodist churches in other countries, particularly those that were founded or supported by the British Methodist Church, such as the churches in India, Australia, New Zealand, the Caribbean, Fiji, and many countries in Africa. The title of "local preacher" was used historically in several Methodist denominations in North America, and local preachers there had the right to marry and bury people (though not to administer Communion) as well as to lead worship; the role has more or less vanished from America today. Although the modern US-based United Methodist Church recognises an order of "lay speakers", they do not have the authority or the responsibility for leading worship in the same way as a local preacher in Britain. Within the last decade, the United Methodist Church began an order called "local pastors," who are appointed by a bishop to serve in one local charge.

== Lay preaching in other denominations ==
Although Methodism has perhaps organised the institution of local preaching more thoroughly than any other denomination, lay preachers are used by many other churches. The other Nonconformist churches in Britain have long had similar arrangements, the United Reformed Church has Assembly Accredited Lay Preachers, the Baptist Union of Great Britain has Nationally Recognised Lay Preachers, the General Assembly of Unitarian & Free Christian Churches (British Unitarians) have GA Recognised Worship Leaders and the Church of England now makes considerable use of lay readers. However, Anglican lay readers, and indeed the lay preachers of other denominations, have never quite enjoyed the same status within their own churches, or the recognition beyond them, that are associated with the Methodist local preacher.
