= Unseen examination =

Type of essay examination

In the United Kingdom, an unseen examination is an essay test in school or college, where the student does not know what questions are going to be asked in advance. The student is required to answer questions based upon what they have learned over the course of their academic study.

In contrast, in a seen examination the questions have been made available to the student prior to examination. A study by Joseph K. Wireko (2015) at Ghana Technology University College found that students felt more confident and less stressed when preparing for seen exams compared to traditional unseen exams. This reduction in anxiety led to better performance and a more positive learning experience.

The vast majority of UK undergraduate exams in all fields, such as law and psychology, are unseen examinations. Unseen examinations are favoured for their inherent protection against plagiarism, and their potential to develop students' ability to handle pressure and time constraints. However, they have been criticised for causing anxiety and stress in students, for negatively impacting motivation and the depth of learning experiences, and for unfairly favouring students who happen to be particularly skilled at unseen written exams as opposed to other assessment methods.
