= George Stroup =

American theologian

George W. Stroup (born 1944) is J.B. Green Professor Emeritus of Theology at Columbia Theological Seminary. He is a minister in the Presbyterian Church (U.S.A.). He is married to Dr. Donna Fox Stroup, a mathematical statistician.

== Biography ==
Stroup first studied history at Rice University before attending Yale Divinity School. He pursued his Ph.D. at Vanderbilt University. He taught as an assistant professor at both Princeton Theological Seminary and Austin Presbyterian Theological Seminary before coming to Columbia Theological Seminary in 1984. In 2005, he was appointed as the J.B. Green Professor of Theology until his retirement in 2014.

Among many contributions, he was on the editorial board for Westminster John Knox Press for The Columbia Series in Reformed Theology (1995) and Feasting on the Word: Preaching for the Revised Common Lectionary (2008-2010). For the Presbyterian Church (U.S.A), he was on the General Assembly Committee on the Inclusion of the Belhar Confession in the Book of Confessions (2009-2010), the General Assembly Select Committee on a Brief Confession of Faith (1984-1991), and The Council on Theology and Culture (1983-1988).

Publications include:

- Why Jesus Matters. Louisville, Kentucky: Westminster John Knox Press, 2011
- Calvin. Nashville, Tennessee: Abingdon Press, 2009.
- Before God. Eerdmans, 2004.
- Many Voices, One God: Being Faithful in a Pluralistic World. Co-Edited with Walter Brueggemann Louisville, Kentucky: Westminster John Knox Press, 1998.
- Reformed Reader: A Sourcebook in Christian Theology. Volume II: Contemporary Trajectories, 1799–Present. Editor. Louisville, Kentucky: Westminster/John Knox Press, 1993.
- Jesus Christ for Today. Philadelphia: The Westminster Press, 1982.
- The Promise of Narrative Theology: Recovering the Gospel in the Church. Richmond, Virginia: John Knox Press, 1981; London, SCM Press, 1984; Eugene, Oregon: Wipf & Stock, 1997.
