= Lay speaker =

A lay speaker is a position in the United Methodist Church for the laity.

Technically, a lay speaker is a “member of a local church … who is ready … to serve the Church... and is well informed on and committed to the Scriptures ... and the UMC” Generally, lay speakers are UMC leaders on local, district, and conference levels. Lay speakers often lead worship services when a minister is not available.

There are two types of lay speakers: local lay speakers and certified lay speakers. Local lay speakers need only take one basic course and serve in their local congregation only. Certified lay speakers must initially take six classes and continue their education once every three years. They may serve churches of which they are not members.

== See also ==
- Laity
- Lay reader
- Methodist local preacher
