= Harmony of the Confessions of Faith =

1581 book edited by Jean-François Salvart

Published in 1581, the Harmonia confessionum fidei (Harmony of Confessions of Faith) was an early attempt at Protestant comparative dogmatics or symbolics.

== Purpose ==
It grew out of a desire for one common Creed, which was modified into the idea of a selected harmony. In this shape it was proposed by the Protestants of Zurich and Geneva. Jean-François Salvart, minister of the Church of Castres, is now recognized as the chief editor of the work with some assistance from Theodore Beza, Lambert Daneau, Antoine de la Roche Chandieu, and Simon Goulart. It was intended as a defense of Protestant, and particularly Reformed, doctrine against the attacks of Roman Catholics and Lutherans. It does not give the confessions in full, but extracts from them on the chief articles of faith, which are classified under nineteen sections. It anticipates Georg Benedikt Winer's method, but for harmonistic purposes.

== Content ==
Besides the principal Reformed Confessions (i.e., the Tetrapolitan, Basel, Helvetic, French, Scots and Belgic Confessions), three Lutheran Confessions are also used, viz., the Augsburg Confession, the Saxon Confession (Confessio Saxonica), and the Württemberg Confession, as well as the Confession of the Unity of the Brethren (1573) and Anglican Confession (1562). The work appeared almost simultaneously with the Lutheran Formula of Concord, and may be called a Reformed Formula of Concord, though differing from the former in being a mere compilation from previous symbols.
