= Jean-François Salvard =

Jean-François Salvard (or Salvart) (c. 1530 – 11 March 1585) was a Reformed theologian, originally from the Aosta Valley and who was active in France, Switzerland and in the Republic of Geneva where he died. He is known as the editor of the Harmonia confessionum of 1581.

== Life ==
He was born at Aosta around 1530, the son of Jean and Louise Vourdain. He became pastor at Nevers in 1561, and was imprisoned in the first of the French Wars of Religion. He went to Geneva, and then ministered at Lyon from 1565 to 1567.

Salvard took refuge in Lausanne in 1568, moving to Geneva the next year, and to Frankfurt in 1571. He returned to Geneva in 1576, and became pastor at Castres in 1582.

== Works ==
The Harmonia confessionum fidei was a Calvinist answer to the Formula of Concord of 1578. Salvard edited for a group including Theodore Beza, Antoine de Chandeau, Lambert Daneau, and Simon Goulart. It documented 11 Protestant confessions, across the Lutheran and Reformed camps.
