= Monarchomachs =

French Huguenot theorists who opposed monarchy at the end of the 16th century

The Monarchomachs (French: Monarchomaques) were originally French Huguenot theorists who opposed monarchy at the end of the 16th century, known in particular for having theoretically justified tyrannicide. The term was originally a pejorative word coined in 1600 by the Scottish royalist and Catholic William Barclay (1548–1608) from the Greek μόναρχος (monarchos – "monarch, sole ruler") and μάχομαι ("makhomai" – the verb meaning "to fight"), meaning "those who fight against monarchs" or "anti-monarchists".

Born out of the French Wars of Religion, they were most active between 1573, a year after the St. Bartholomew's Day massacre, and 1584. The Monarchomachs pleaded in favour of a form of "popular sovereignty". Arguing for a sort of contract between the sovereign and the people, they have been considered as the precursors of social contract theories.

== Theory of tyrannicide ==
The Monarchomachs included jurists such as the Calvinists François Hotman (1524–1590), Théodore de Bèze (1519–1605), Simon Goulart (1543–1628), Nicolas Barnaud (1538–1604), Hubert Languet (1518–1581), Philippe de Mornay (1549–1623) and George Buchanan (1506–1582), as well as Catholic writers such as Juan de Mariana (1536–1624). They had a special influence in the so-called Dutch revolt and contributed to the Netherlands' Act of Abjuration. Through the means of libels and theoretical tracts, they revived the doctrine of the tyrannicide. It had been opposed during the Middle Ages by the "legists" (jurists who theorized the royal power) who attempted to reserve the title of tyrant to those who tried to overturn the ruling monarch. Legists thus ended up legitimizing, under the name of "tyrannicide", the assassinations of political opponents ordered by the monarch. The Dutch Constitutional Law professor A.M. Donner on page 16 of his state law manual calls Johannus Althusius "the last of the monarchomachs". Typically Johannes Althusius in his Politica opposes Jean Bodin.

Monarchomachs considered that the end of the state was prosperity of the whole social group, as the true sovereign, granting effective practice of power to the king, whose authority remained of divine right. Exercise of popular sovereignty was to be delegated to the magistrates and the officers of the crown. They considered that the people were a collective body, possessed of a specific wisdom, which allowed them to understand better than the king the common good, distinct from the interest of each of its parties. Assimilated to the medieval universitas, the people was thus considered as a legal subject, whose interests were represented by the General Estates. This conception of the magistrates and the association of wise people as best representants of the people separated them from modern conception of democracy, as they restricted effective power to a minority. Max Weber considered them in his lecture Politics as a Vocation as participants of the movement of rationalization of law in Europe.

The Monarchomachs also claimed that if the sovereign persecuted true religion, he would violate the contract concluded between God and the people, who were thus granted a right of rebellion. They were inspired by Aristotle, Thomas Aquinas, and the School of Salamanca on the killing of "bad kings". This legitimization of tyrannicide may have inspired as much the friar Clément, who assassinated Henry III in 1589, as Ravaillac, who assassinated Henry IV in 1610. Rebellion against tyranny was considered not only as necessary, but as a divine right.

== Monarchomach theory in the 16th century ==
The term Monarchomachs was coined by William Barclay in his book De Regno et Regali Potestate (”About the Powers of Authority and Royalty”), published in 1600. Barclay's theory was that the Huguenots had lost their struggle with the Catholic Church and were turning their battle towards the government to undermine the king's support of the Catholics. Eventually, the term was used to classify anyone who was opposed to the king's rule.

At first a Protestant doctrine, the notion of tyrannicide was reappropriated by the Catholics when Protestants came to be kings. It was then used in revolutionary discourses during the debates concerning the execution of Louis XVI, while the right of rebellion was included in the 1789 Declaration of the Rights of Man and of the Citizen.

Influenced by the Huguenots, some British thinkers also embraced the Monarchomaque movement.

== See also ==
- Beerwolf, a concept introduced by Martin Luther
- Early modern France

== Sources ==
- Original works:
  - François Hotman. Francogallia. - Francofurti, apud heredes A. Wecheli, 1856.
  - François Hotman and Joseph de Paris, capucin. Dessein perpétuel des Espagnols à la monarchie universelle, avec les preuves d'iceluy. - S.l., s.n., 1624.
  - Théodore de Bèze. Du droit des magistrats sur leurs subjets, traité très nécessaire en ce temps, pour advertir de leur devoir, tant les magistrats que les subjets. - S. l., s. n., 1575..
  - Stephanus Junius Brutus (pseudonym attributed to Hubert Languet and Philippe de Mornay). De la puissance légitime du prince sur le peuple, et du peuple sur le Prince, traité très-utile et digne de lecture en ce temps escrit en Latin par Estienne Iunius Brutus, et nouvellement traduit en françois. - S.l., s.n., 1581.
  - Anonym. Le Réveille matin des François. Touchant les troubles & mouvements de ce temps. - S.l., s.n., 1622.
  - Nicolas Barnaud. Le Réveille-matin des françois et de leurs voisins, composé par Eusebe Philadelphe cosmopolite. - Edimbourg, Impr. de Jaques James, 1574.
  - Anonym. Le caractère de la royauté et de la tyrannie, faisant voir par un discours politique : 1. Les Qualitez nécessaires à un Prince pour bien gouverner ses sujects. 2. Les Maux qui arrivent aux peuples lorsque les souverains sont incapables de les gouverner. - Paris, 1652.
  - William Allen. A treatise made in defence of the lauful power and authoritie of priesthod to remitte sinnes : of the peoples duetie for confession of their sinnes to Gods ministers : And of the churches meaning concerning indulgences, commonly called the Popes Pardos...- 1567, Ioannem Foulerum.
  - Juan de Mariana. Joannis Marianae, ... de Rege et regis Institutione libri III... - Tolède, Rodericus, 1599.
- Articles and commentary:
  - Paul-Alexis Mellet (dir.), Et de sa bouche sortait un glaive. Les Monarchomaques au XVIème siècle, Genève, Droz, 2006.
