= Jean Papire Masson =

French humanist historian

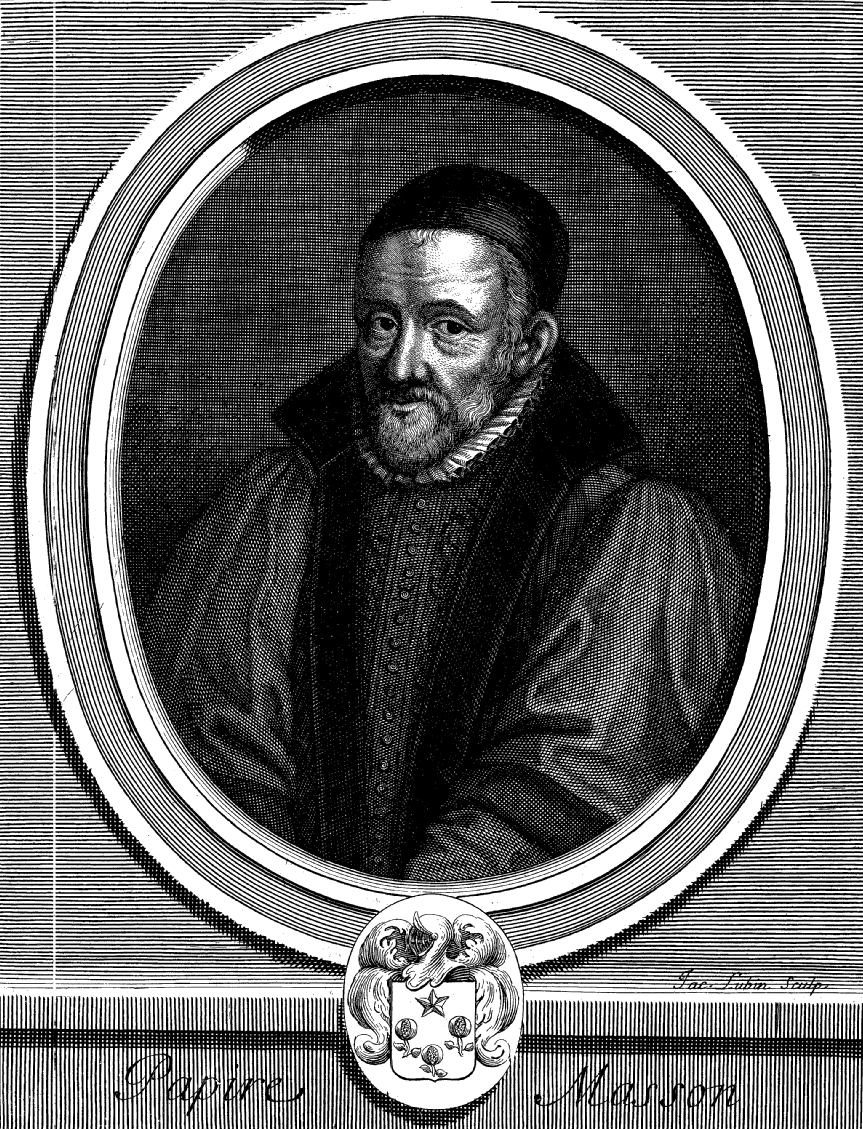
Jean Papire Masson, 1696, engraved by Jean Lubin.

Jean Papire Masson Latin: Papirius (1544 in Saint-Germain-Laval, Loire – 1611) was a French humanist historian, also known as a geographer, biographer, literary critic and jurist.

== Life ==
Masson was initially a Jesuit but left the Society. He studied law at Angers under François Baudouin around 1570. He became close to the circle of Catherine de' Medici, particularly to Carlo Boni, and became professor of law at Angers, where Boni was bishop. Later, he was librarian to the Chevalier de Chiverny, avocat to the Parlement of Paris and married.

== Works ==
He defended Antoine Matharel against François Hotman. He may, in fact, have written much of Matharel's Responsio (1575) to Hotman's monarchomach work Francogallia. The debate became a pamphlet war and a slanging match.

The Latin life of John Calvin attributed to Masson had a reputation in its time as fair-minded.

Masson discovered a manuscript of Agobard in 1604 and edited it.
