= Reformed confessions of faith =

Statements of faith for Calvinist churches

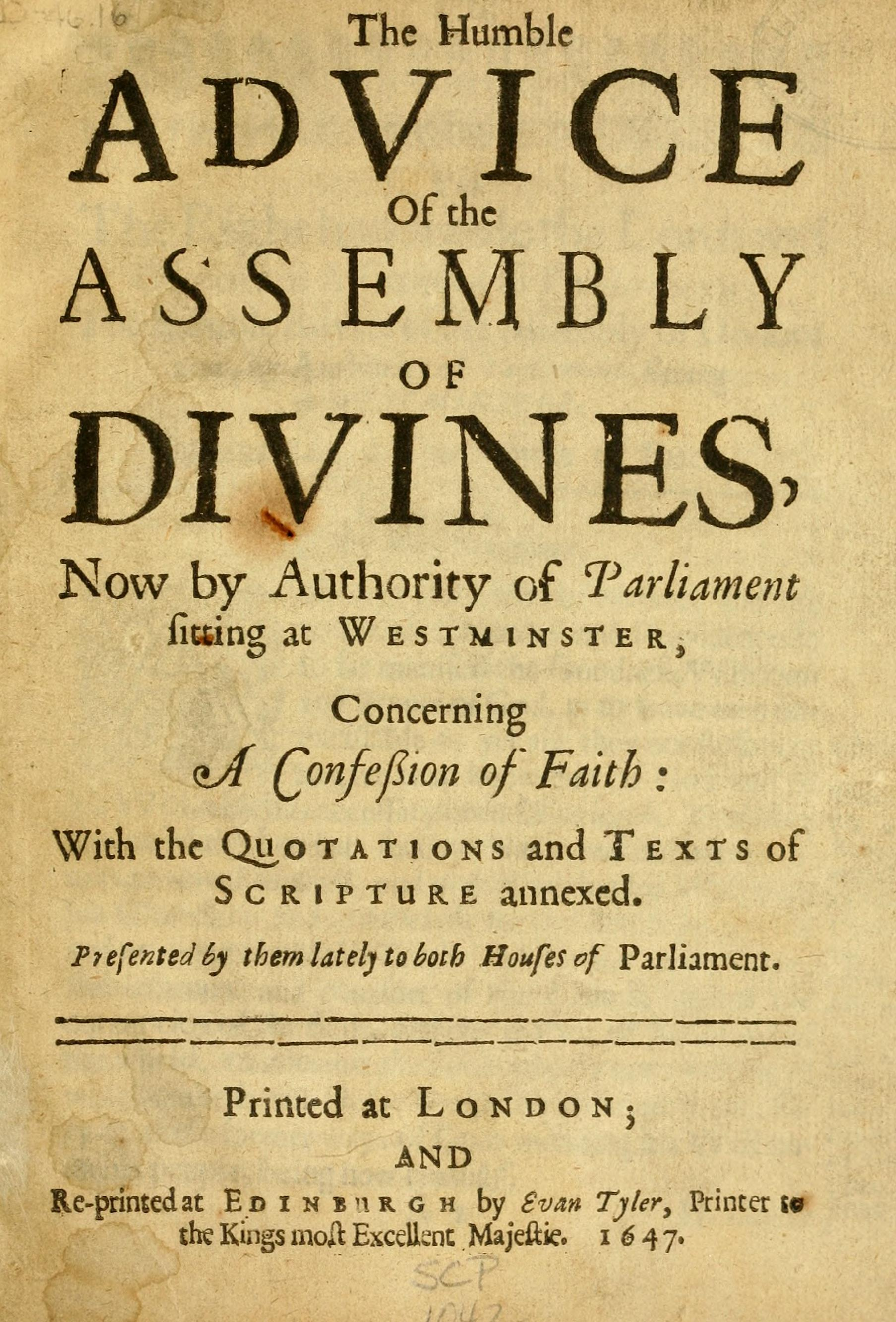
The Westminster Confession. Title page, 1st ed.

The reformed confessions of faith are the confessional documents of various Reformed churches. These express the doctrinal views of the churches adopting the confession. Confessions play a crucial part in the theological identity of reformed churches, either as standards to which ministers must subscribe, or more generally as accurate descriptions of their faith. Most confessions date to the 16th and 17th century.

Catechisms, canons, theses and other such documents may not be confessions per se, yet these still serve as symbols of the reformed faith.

== Confessions ==
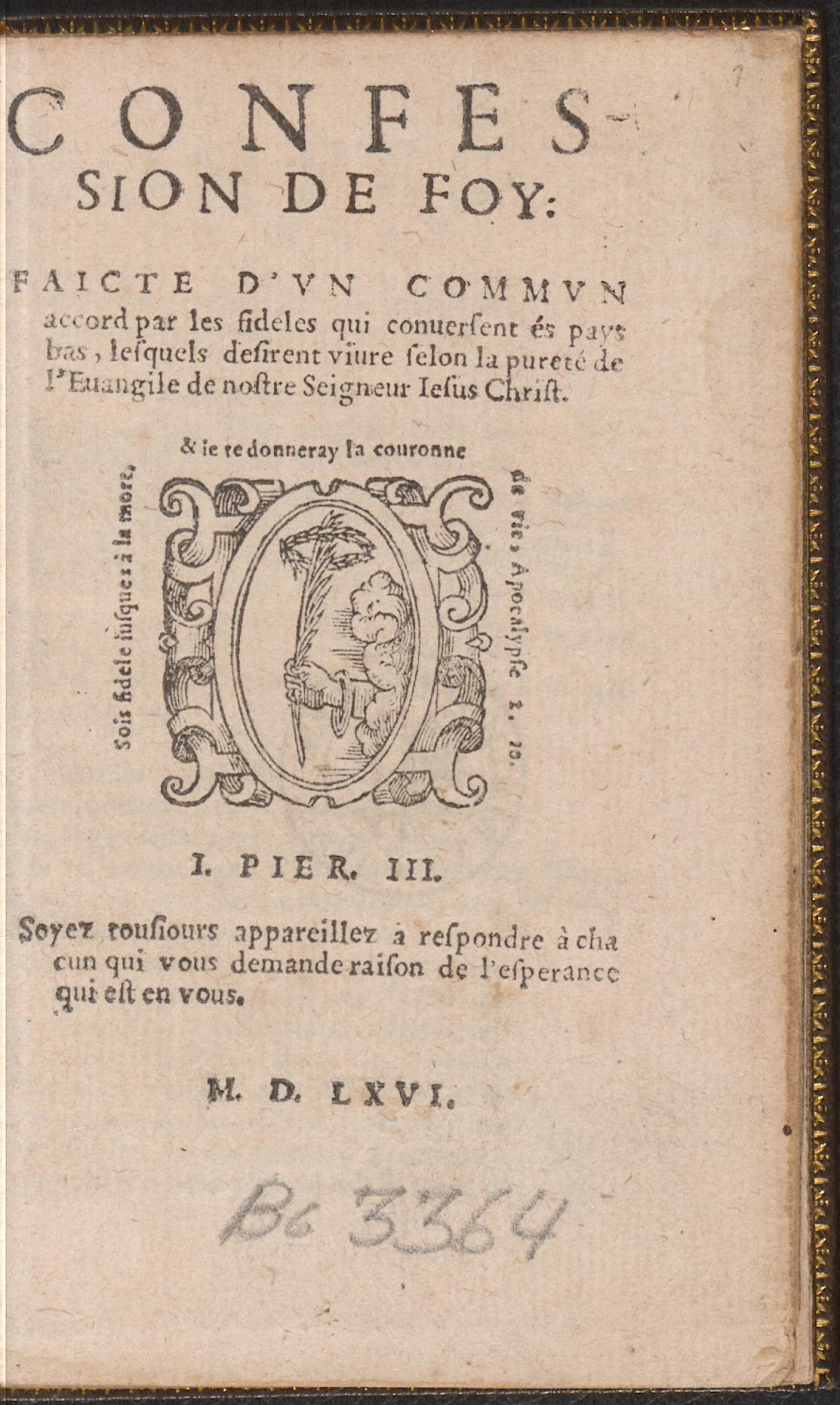
The Belgic Confession.

Confessions state that church's beliefs in a full, while not exhaustive, way.

=== Continental Reformed ===
- Confession of the East Friesland Preachers (1528)
- Tetrapolitan Confession (1530)
- Synodical Declaration of Bern (1532)
- First Confession of Basel (1534)
- First Helvetic Confession/Second Confession of Basel (1536)
- Geneva Confession (1536)
- Altered Augsburg Confession (1540)
- Confession of the English Congregation at Geneva (1556)
- Guanabara Confession of Faith (1558)
  - Authored by Huguenots in South America
- French Confession of Faith (1559)
- Confession of the Christian Faith (1559)
- Belgic Confession (1561)
- Second Helvetic Confession (1562)
- Erlauthal Confession (1562)
- Hungarian Confession (1562)
- Confession of Nassau (1578)
- Bremen Consensus (1595)
- Sigismund Confession (1614)
- Theological Declaration of Barmen (1934)
- Belhar Confession (1986)
  - First adopted in South Africa and since adopted by many mainline Reformed churches.

=== Presbyterian ===
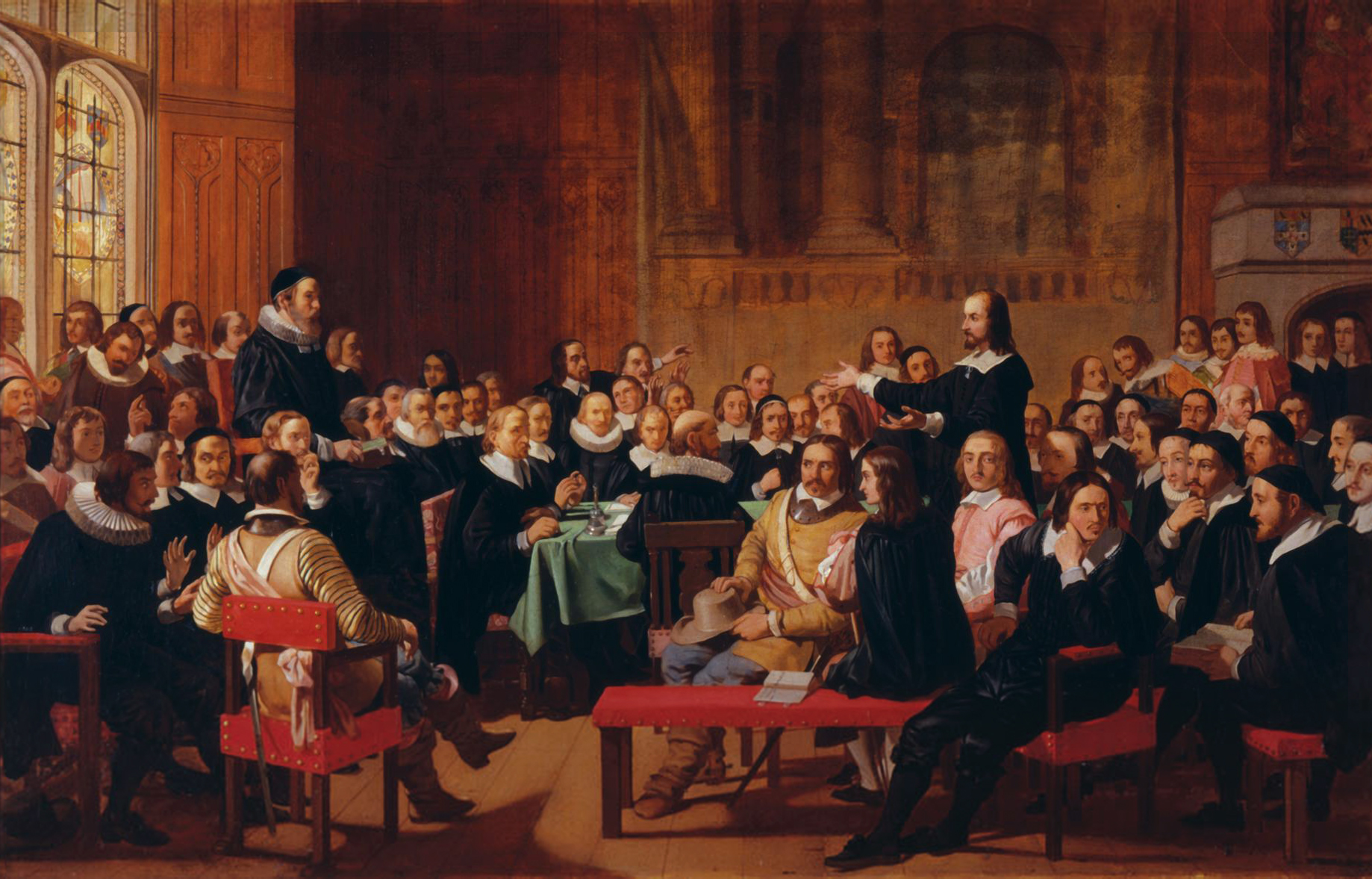
The Westminster Confession and catechisms were produced by a committee rather than a single author.

- Scots Confession (1560)
- Westminster Confession of Faith (1646)
- Confession of Faith Ratification Act (1690)
- Confession of 1967
- Brief Statement of Faith (1991)

=== Congregationalist ===
The presbyterians' Westminster was formed by an assembly of ministers called by parliament for use in the established churches of England and Scotland. For congregationalists, this was not the case. The difference in application of the congregationalists' primary confession, Savoy, is that it was written as a declaration of consensus, and as such it was not treated as morally binding upon church officers like Westminster for presbyterians (called subscriptionism).

Local congregational churches are historically formed around covenants (e.g. the Dedham Covenant), often unique to that church, another kind of confession.

- Westminster Confession of Faith (1646)
  - Though not produced by congregationalists, the Synod of Cambridge (1648) adopted the WCF without revision, only referring to their own Cambridge Platform regarding church government (ch. XXV., XXX., and XXXI)
- Savoy Declaration (1658)
  - Adopted in America as the Saybrook (1708)
- The Declaration of 1833
- Declaration of Faith (1865)

=== Baptist ===
Baptist confessions, like the Congregationalists, are statements of agreement rather than enforceable rules. They "have never been held as tests of orthodoxy, as of any authoritative or binding force; they merely reflect the existing harmony of views and the scriptural interpretations of the churches assenting to them."

Only confessional Particular Baptists regard themselves to be "Reformed", since orthodox and historic Reformed theology is inherently paedobaptistic. Part of the Baptist movement finds its origin in the nonconformist movement in England, observing Calvinistic theology with the Presbyterians and Congregationalists. Baptists subscribing to Calvinist soteriology are called Particular Baptists or Reformed Baptist. There are further subdivisions of Particular Baptists, such as Regular and Primitive.

Baptist churches, like the Congregationalists with whom they share views of polity, compose church covenants for the local congregation.

- First London Baptist Confession (1644)
- The Confession of Somerset (1656)
- Second London Baptist Confession (1689)
  - Adopted in America as the Philadelphia Confession (1742)
- New Hampshire Confession (1833 or 1844)
- Baptist Affirmation of Faith 1966

=== Anglican ===
Anglican churches are not confessional in the same strict sense as in Lutheran churches. Anglican doctrine is most defined by Lex orandi, lex credendi ("the law of praying [is] the law of believing").

- Forty-two Articles (1553)
- Thirty-Nine Articles (1562/63)
- Irish Articles of Religion (1615)

=== Methodist ===
- Calvinistic Methodist Confession of Faith (1823)

== Catechisms ==
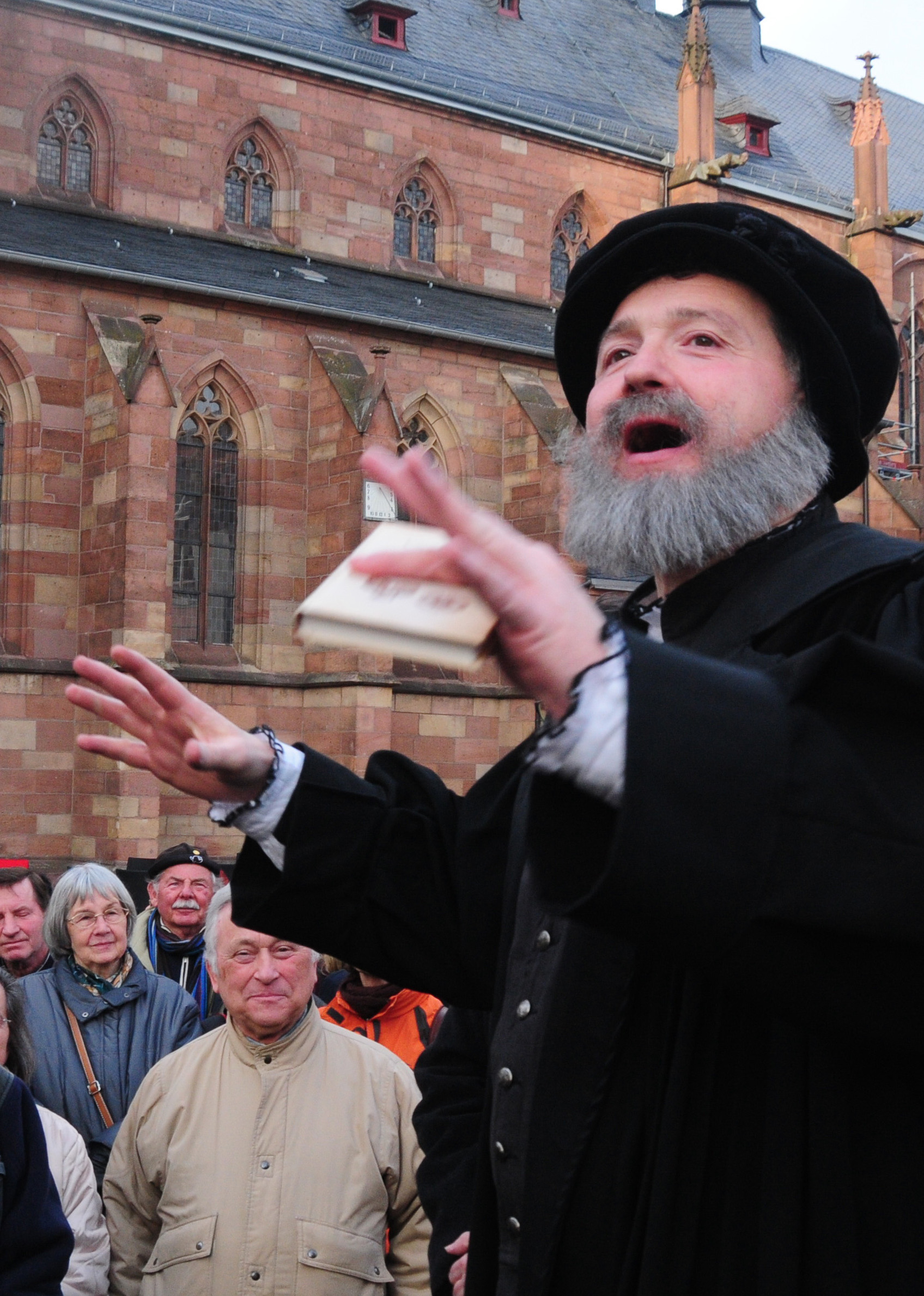
German Theologian Michael Landgraf portraying a reenactment of Zacharias Ursinus, principal author of the Heidelberg Catechism.

Catechisms are teaching tools in the church, usually in a question and answer format.

=== Continental ===
- Genevan Catechism (1541)
- Emden Catechism (1554)
- Heidelberg Catechism (1563)
- Wittenberg Catechism (1571)

=== Presbyterian ===
- Westminster Shorter Catechism (1649)
- Westminster Larger Catechism (1649)

=== Congregationalist ===
- Spiritual Milk for Boston Babes (1656)

=== Baptist ===
- Keach's Catechism (1677)

=== Anglican ===
- Anglican Catechism (1549)
  - Found within the Book of Common Prayer

== Constitutions, ordinals, and platforms of church order ==
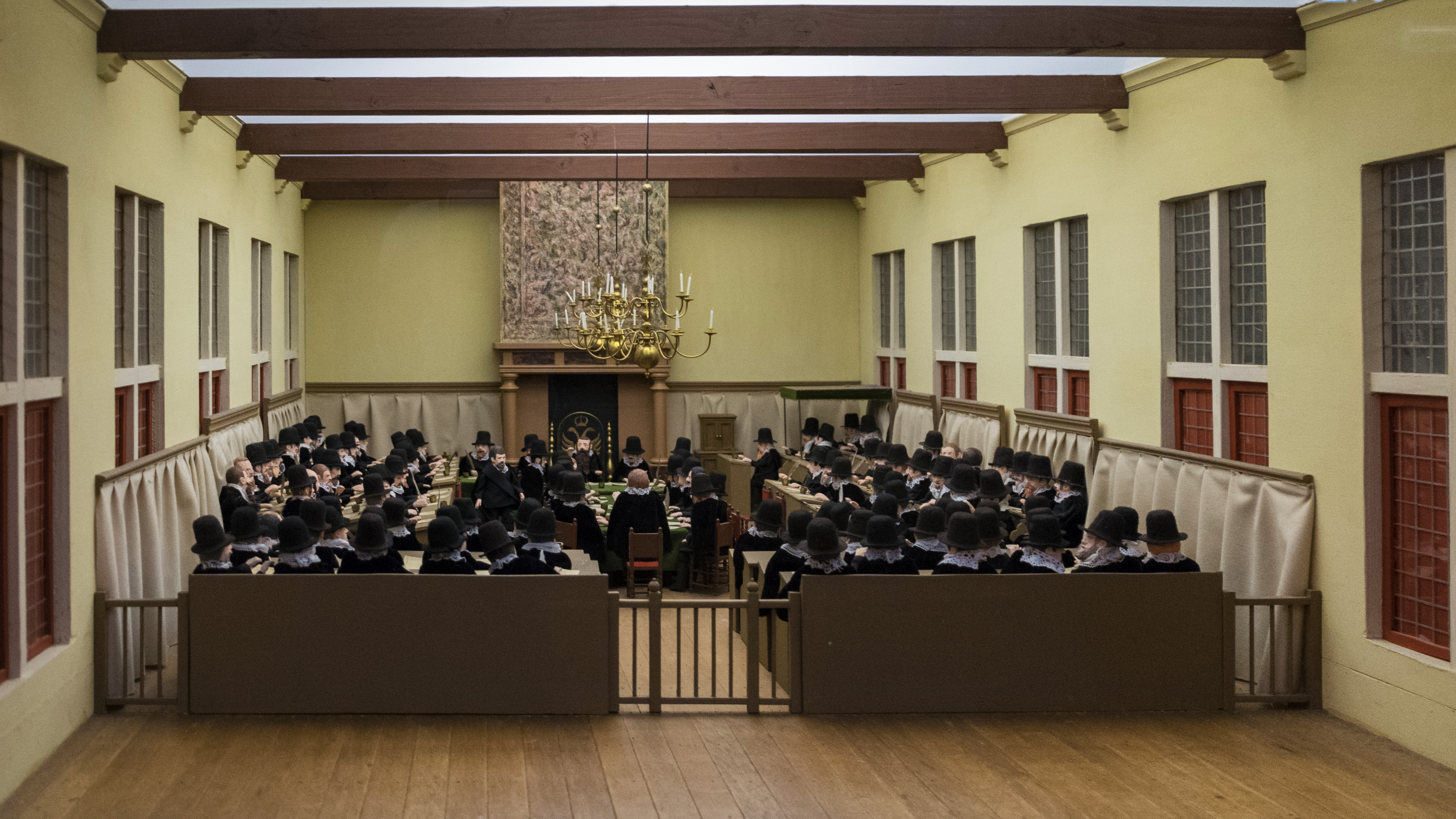
The Synod of Dort was convened to respond to the Remonstrants.

These documents relate to the ecclesiastical polity of the church.

=== Continental ===
- Church Order of Dort (1618)
- Ecclesiastical Ordinances (1641)

=== Presbyterian ===
- Form of Presbyterial Church Government (1645)

=== Congregationalist ===
- Cambridge Platform (1648)
- Platform of Discipline of the Savoy Declaration (1658)
  - Full title: Of the Institution of Churches, and the Order appointed in them by Jesus Christ
- Fifteen Articles of the Saybrook Platform (1708)
- Boston Platform (1865)

== Occasional documents ==
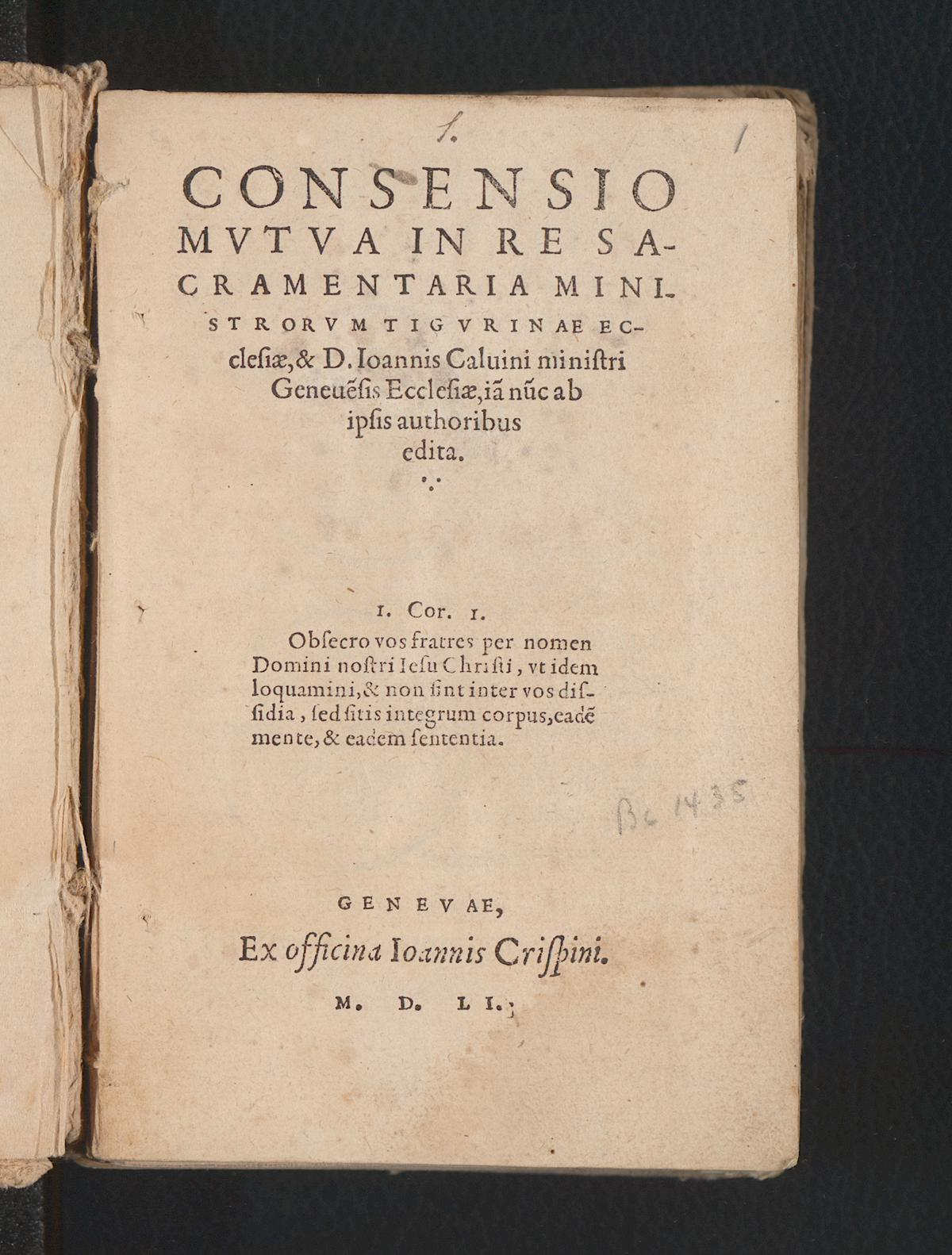
The Consensus Tigurinus found common ground between Calvin in Geneva and Bullinger in Zurich.

These documents are less general in scope than a usual confession. They may confess that church's response to a theological controversy (e.g. the Canons of Dort) or seek to find common ground between discrete churches (e.g. the Consensus Tigurinus).

- Zwingli's Sixty-Seven Articles (1523)
- Ten Theses of Berne (1528)
- Lausanne Articles (1536)
- Zurich Consensus (1549)
- Sendomir Consensus (1570)
- Harmony of the Confessions of Faith (1581), a response to the Lutheran Formula of Concord.
- Canons of Dort (1619)
- Helvetic Consensus (1675)
- Conclusions of Utrecht (1905)
