= Nicolas Colladon =

Nicolas Colladon (Bourges, France, c. 1530 – Lausanne, 1586) was a French Calvinist pastor.

Colladon was the son of French parents who in 1536 took shelter in the Republic of Geneva for religious reasons. He studied theology at Lausanne and Geneva. He became citizen (burgher) of the Republic of Geneva in 1557. He was a friend of John Calvin and pastor at Vandœuvres and Geneva. In 1564 he became chancellor of the Genevan Academy where he taught theology until the death of Calvin. With Theodore Beza, he wrote a famous biography of the French reformer in 1565. He came into conflict with the magistrates of Geneva, and in 1571 he moved to Lausanne and taught at the local Academy.

He was the nephew of the Genevan legislator Germain Colladon; Nicolas and Germain are listed as possible witnesses in the prosecution case against the theologian Jérôme-Hermès Bolsec.

Colladon married Marthe Le Breton in 1553. Calvin was godfather to their children, Abdias and Marthe.

== Written works ==
- Colladon, N. (1581). Methodus facilima ad explicationem sacrosanctae apocalypseos Ioannis theologi: ex ipso libro desumpta. Switzerland: LePreux.
- Life of Calvin (with Théodore de Bèze) (1565)
- De Haereticis Gladio Puniendis (1560) (translation of Bèze’s work)
