= Theodore Beza =

French Calvinist theologian, reformer and scholar (1519–1605)

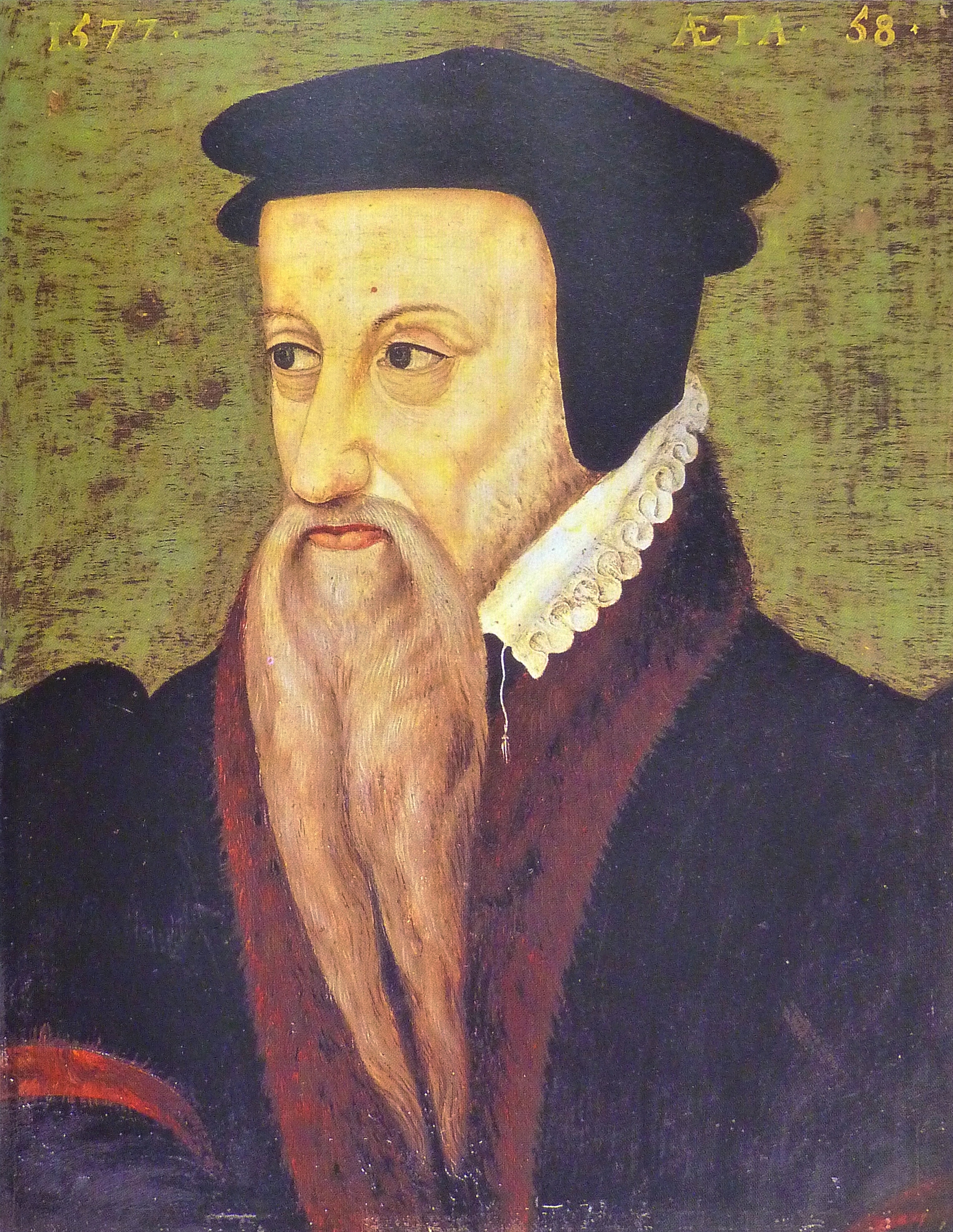
- Portrait of Beza at age 58, 1577
- Born: Théodore de Bèze; 24 June 1519; Vézelay, Kingdom of France
- Died: 13 October 1605 (aged 86); Geneva, Republic of Geneva
- Occupations: Theologian, author
- Notable work: Right of Magistrates (1574)
- Theological work
- Era: Reformation
- Tradition or movement: Calvinism
- Main interests: Systematic theology
- Notable ideas: Supralapsarianism

Theodore Beza (Latin: Theodorus Beza; French: Théodore de Bèze or de Besze; 24 June 1519 – 13 October 1605) was a French Calvinist Protestant theologian, reformer and scholar who played an important role in the Protestant Reformation. He was a disciple of John Calvin and lived most of his life in Geneva. Beza succeeded Calvin as the spiritual leader of the Republic of Geneva.

== Biography ==
=== Early life ===
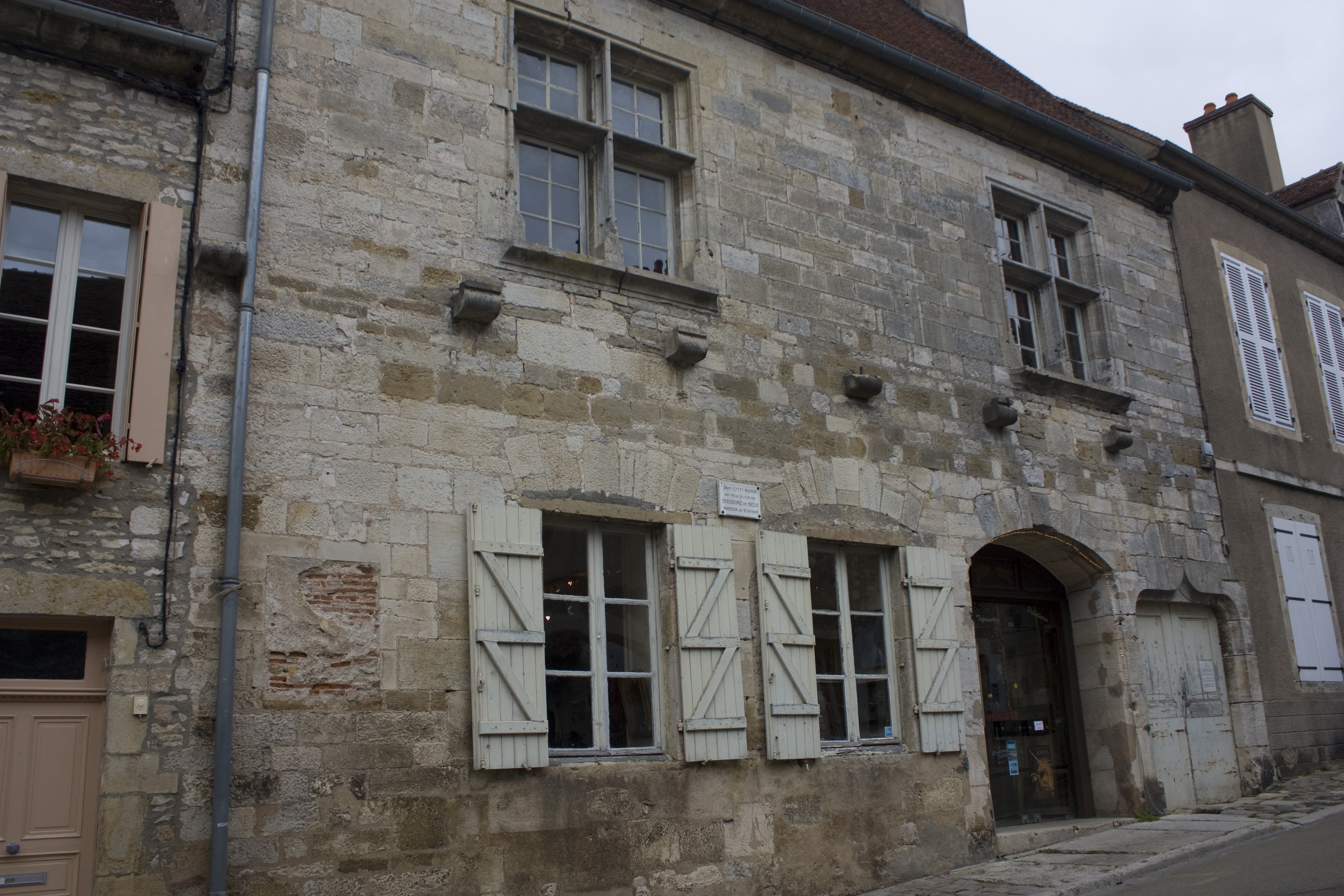
Theodore Beza's birthplace in Vézelay

Theodore Beza was born on 24 June 1519 in Vézelay, in the province of Burgundy, France. His father, Pierre de Bèze, bailiff of Vézelay, descended from a Burgundian noble family; his mother, Marie Bourdelot, was known for her generosity. Beza's father had two brothers; Nicolas, who was member of the parlement of Paris, and Claude, who was abbot of the Cistercian monastery of Froimont in the diocese of Beauvais. Nicolas, who was unmarried, during a visit to Vézelay was so pleased with Theodore that, with the permission of his parents, he took him to Paris to educate him there.

From Paris, Theodore was sent to Orléans in December 1528 to receive instruction from the German humanist Melchior Wolmar. He was received into Wolmar's house, and the day on which this took place was afterward celebrated as a second birthday. Beza soon followed his teacher to Bourges, where the latter was called by Duchess Margaret of Angoulême, sister of King Francis I. At the time, Bourges was the focus of the Reformation movement in France. In 1534, after Francis I issued his edict against ecclesiastical innovations, Wolmar returned to Germany. Beza, in accordance with the wish of his father, went back to Orléans and studied law from 1535 to 1539. The pursuit of law had little attraction for him; he enjoyed more the reading of the ancient classics, especially Ovid, Catullus, and Tibullus.

He received a licentiate in law on 11 August 1539, and, as his father desired, went to Paris, where he began to practice. To support him, his relatives had obtained for him two benefices, the proceeds of which amounted to 700 golden crowns a year; and his uncle had promised to make him his successor. Beza spent two years in Paris and gained a prominent position in literary circles. To escape the many temptations to which he was exposed, with the knowledge of two friends, he became engaged in the year 1544 to a young girl of humble descent, Claudine Denosse, promising to publicly marry her as soon as his circumstances would allow it.

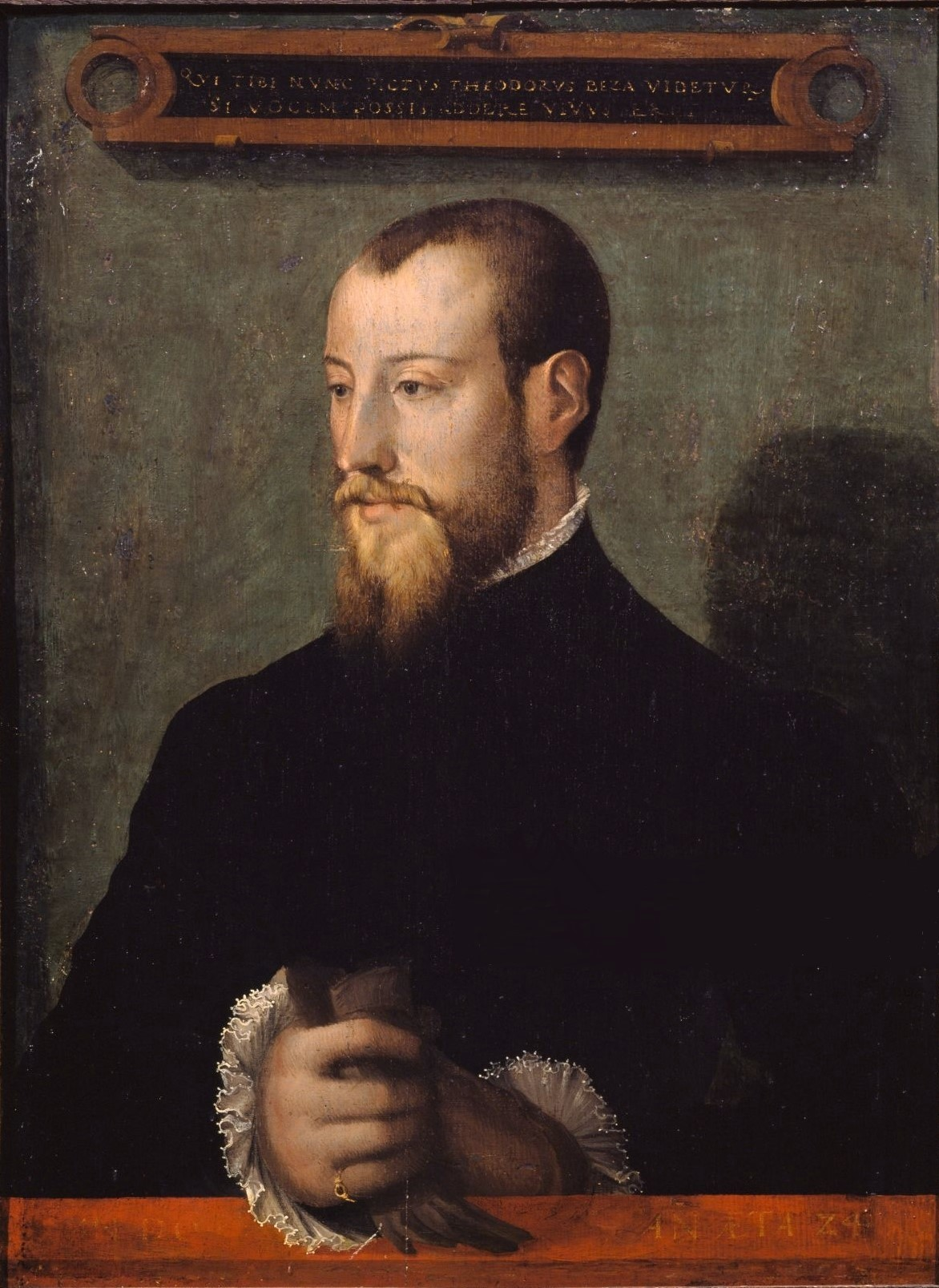
Beza at age 24, 16th-century portrait

In 1548, Beza published a collection of Latin poetry, Juvenilia, which made him famous, and he was considered one of the best writers of Latin poetry of his time. But his work attracted unexpected criticism; as Philip Schaff says, "Prurient minds ... read between his lines what he never intended to put there, and imagined offences of which he was not guilty even in thought". Shortly after the publication of his book, Beza fell ill with plague and his illness, it is reported, revealed to him his spiritual needs. Following his recovery, Beza adhered to the Reformed faith, a decision which resulted in a condemnation from the parlement of Paris, the loss of part of his property and the need to leave France. He then resolved to sever his connections of the time, and went to the Republic of Geneva, which, with the Genevan Reformation, had become a place of refuge for adherents of the Reformation. He arrived in Geneva with Claudine on 23 October 1548.

=== Teacher at Lausanne ===
Theodore Beza was received in Geneva by John Calvin, who had met him already in Wolmar's house, and was at once married to Claudine. Beza was at a loss for immediate occupation so he went to Tübingen to see his former teacher Wolmar. On his way home, he visited Pierre Viret at Lausanne, who brought about his appointment as professor of Greek at the Academy of Lausanne in November 1549. Beza served as rector of the academy from 1552 to 1554.

Beza found time to write a Biblical drama, Abraham Sacrifiant, in which he contrasted Catholicism with Protestantism. The work was well-received. The text of some verses includes directions for musical performance, but no music survives.

In 1551, Beza was asked by Calvin to complete the French metrical translations of the Psalms begun by Clément Marot. Thirty-four of his translations were published in the 1551 edition of the Genevan Psalter, and six more were added to later editions. About the same time he published Passavantius, a satire directed against Pierre Lizet, the former president of the Parlement of Paris, and principal originator of the "fiery chamber" (chambre ardente), who, at the time (1551), was abbot of St. Victor near Paris and publishing a number of polemical writings.

Of a more serious character were two controversies in which Beza was involved at this time: The first concerned the doctrine of predestination and the controversy of Calvin with Jerome Hermes Bolsec and the second referred to the execution of Michael Servetus at Geneva on 27 October 1553. In defense of Calvin and the Genevan magistrates, Beza published, in 1554, the work De haereticis a civili magistratu puniendis (translated into French in 1560).

=== Journeys on behalf of the Protestants ===
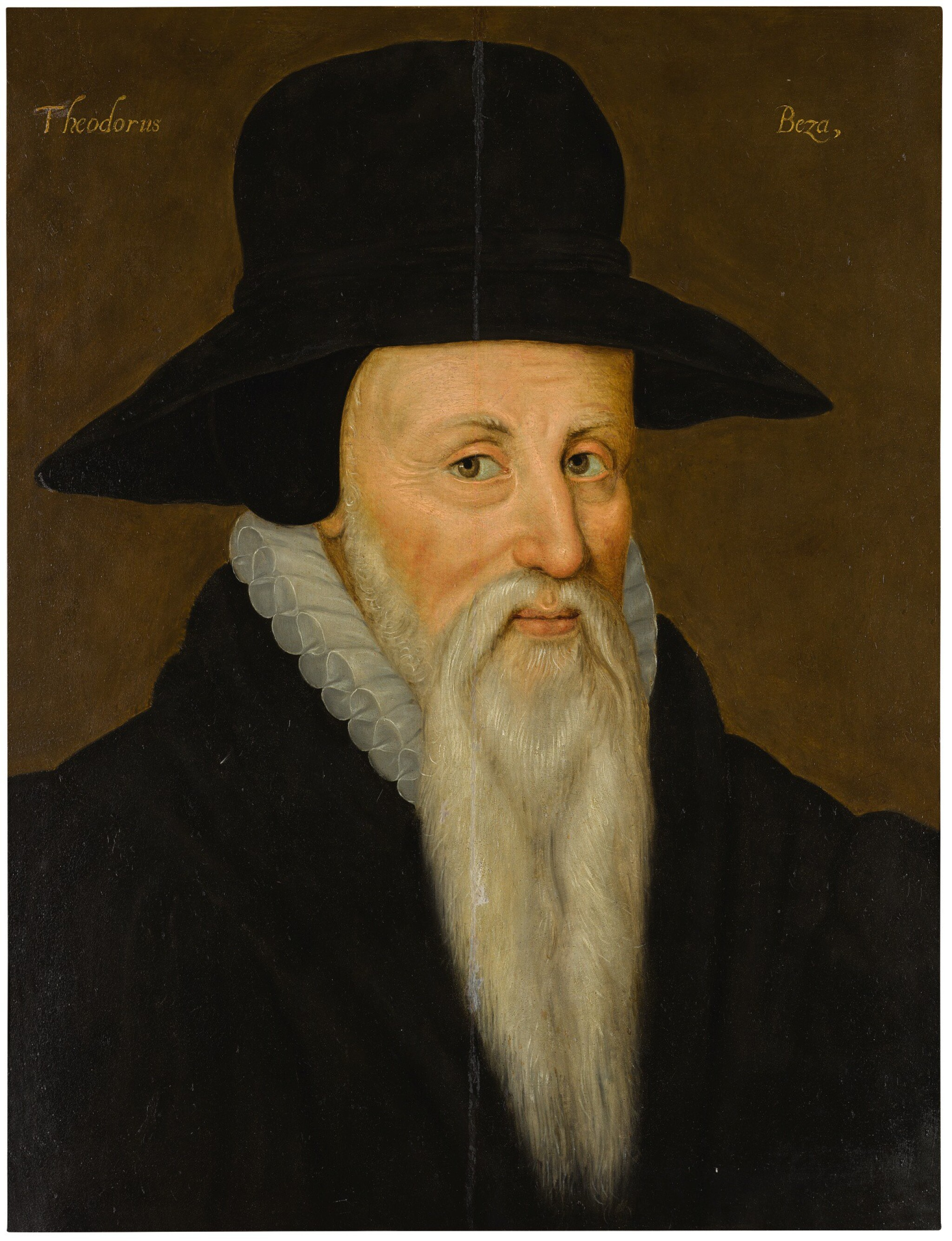
Portrait of Theodore Beza, by English School, 17th century

In 1557, Beza took a special interest in the Waldensians of Piedmont, Italy, who were being harassed by the French government. On their behalf, he went with William Farel to Bern, Zürich, Basel, and Schaffhausen, then to Strasburg, Mömpelgard, Baden, and Göppingen. In Baden and Göppingen, Beza and Farel made a declaration concerning the Waldensians' views on the sacrament on 14 May 1557. The written declaration clearly stated their position and was well received by the Lutheran theologians, but was strongly disapproved of in Bern and Zurich.

In the autumn of 1558, Beza undertook a second journey with Farel to Worms by way of Strasburg in the hopes of bringing about an intercession by the Evangelical princes of the empire in favor of the persecuted brethren at Paris. With Melanchthon and other theologians then assembled at the Colloquy of Worms, Beza proposed a union of all Protestant Christians, but the proposal was decidedly denied by Zurich and Bern.

False reports reached the German princes that the hostilities against the Huguenots in France had ceased and no embassy was sent to the court of France. As a result, Beza undertook another journey with Farel, Johannes Buddaeus, and Gaspard Carmel to Strasburg and Frankfurt, where the sending of an embassy to Paris was resolved upon.

=== Settling in Geneva ===
Upon his return to Lausanne, Beza was greatly disturbed. In union with many ministers and professors in city and country, Viret at last thought of establishing a consistory and of introducing a church discipline which should apply excommunication especially at the celebration of the communion. But the Bernese, then in control of Lausanne, would have no Calvinistic church government. This caused many difficulties, and Beza thought it best in 1558 to settle at Geneva. Here he was given chair of Greek in the newly established academy, and after Calvin's death also that of theology. He was also obliged to preach.

He completed the revision of Pierre Olivetan's translation of the New Testament, begun some years before. In 1559, he undertook another journey in the interest of the Huguenots, this time to Heidelberg. At about the same time, he had to defend Calvin against Joachim Westphal in Hamburg and Tilemann Heshusius.

More important than this polemical activity was Beza's statement of his own confession. It was originally prepared for his father in justification of his actions and published in revised form to promote Evangelical knowledge among Beza's countrymen. It was printed in Latin in 1560 with a dedication to Wolmar. An English translation was published at London in 1563, 1572, and 1585. Translations into German, Dutch, and Italian were also issued.

=== Events of 1560–1563 ===
In the meantime, things took such shape in France that the happiest future for Protestantism seemed possible. King Antoine of Navarre, yielding to the urgent requests of Evangelical noblemen, declared his willingness to listen to a prominent teacher of the Church. Beza, a French nobleman and head of the academy in the metropolis of French Protestantism, was invited to Castle Nerac, but he could not plant the seed of Evangelical faith in the heart of the king.

In the following year, 1561, Beza represented the Evangelicals at the Colloquy of Poissy, and in an eloquent manner defended the principles of the Evangelical faith. The colloquy was without result, but Beza as the head and advocate of all Reformed congregations of France was revered and hated at the same time. The queen insisted upon another colloquy, which was opened at St. Germain 28 January 1562, eleven days after the proclamation of the famous January edict, which granted important privileges to those of the Reformed faith. But the colloquy was broken off when it became evident that the Catholic party was preparing (after the Massacre of Vassy, on 1 March) to overthrow Protestantism.

Beza hastily issued a circular letter (25 March) to all Reformed congregations of the empire, and went to Orléans with the Huguenot leader Conde and his troops. It was necessary to proceed quickly and energetically. But there were neither soldiers nor money. At the request of Conde, Beza visited all Huguenot cities to obtain both. He also wrote a manifesto in which he argued the justice of the Reformed cause. As one of the messengers to collect soldiers and money among his coreligionists, Beza was appointed to visit England, Germany, and Switzerland. He went to Strasburg and Basel, but met with failure. He then returned to Geneva, which he reached on 4 September. He had hardly been there fourteen days when he was called once more to Orléans by D'Andelot. The campaign was becoming more successful; but the publication of the unfortunate edict of pacification which Conde accepted (12 March 1563) filled Beza and all Protestant France with horror.

=== Calvin's successor ===
For 22 months Beza had been absent from Geneva, and the interests of school and Church there and especially the condition of Calvin made it necessary for him to return, as there was no one to take the place of Calvin, who was sick and unable to work. Calvin and Beza arranged to perform their duties jointly in alternate weeks, but the death of Calvin occurred soon afterward (27 May 1564). As a matter of course Beza was his successor.

Until 1580, Beza was not only moderator of the Company of Pastors, but also the real soul of the Academy of Geneva which Calvin had founded in 1559. As long as he lived, Beza was interested in higher education. The Protestant youth for nearly forty years thronged his lecture-room to hear his theological lectures, in which he expounded the purest Calvinistic orthodoxy. As a counselor he was listened to by both magistrates and pastors. He founded the Academy's law faculty in which notable jurists such as François Hotman, Giulio Pace, Lambert Daneau, and Denis Godefroy, lectured in turn.

=== Course of events after 1564 ===
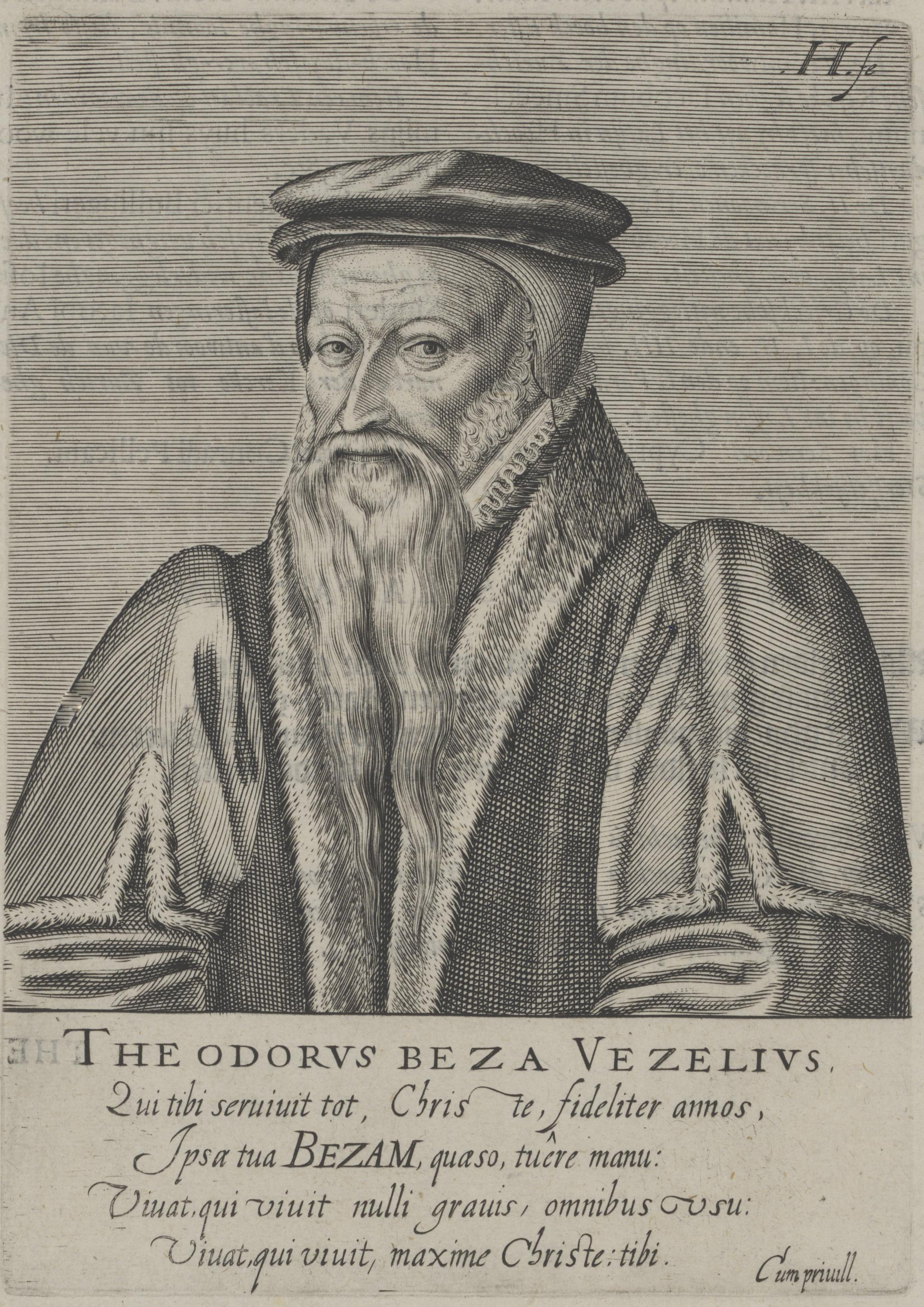
Woodcut of Theodore Beza

Beza successfully continued Calvin’s work within the Genevan church, helped by the city authorities having largely adopted Calvin’s ideas by this time with no major doctrinal disputes, though there were debates on more practical issues such as the authority of magistrates over pastors, freedom in preaching, and the balance between ministerial freedom and the authority of the Company of Pastors. Beza on his part was less protective of the independence of the church from the city authorities than Calvin had been.

Beza did not believe it wise for the Company of Pastors to have a permanent head. He convinced the Company to petition the Small Council to have limited terms for the position of moderator. In 1580 the Council agreed to a weekly rotating presidency. He mediated between the compagnie and the magistracy; the latter continually asked his advice even in political questions. He corresponded with all the leaders of the Reformed party in Europe. After the St. Bartholomew's Day Massacre (1572), he used his influence to give to the refugees a hospitable reception at Geneva.

In 1574, he wrote his De jure magistratuum (Right of Magistrates), in which he emphatically protested against tyranny in religious matters, and affirmed that it is legitimate for a people to oppose an unworthy magistracy in a practical manner and if necessary to use weapons and depose them.

Without being a great dogmatician like his master, nor a creative genius in the ecclesiastical realm, Beza had qualities which made him famous as humanist, exegete, orator, and leader in religious and political affairs, and qualified him to be the guide of the Calvinists in all Europe. In the various controversies into which he was drawn, Beza often showed an excess of irritation and intolerance, from which Bernardino Ochino, pastor of the Italian congregation at Zurich (on account of a treatise which contained some objectionable points on polygamy), and Sebastian Castellio at Basel (on account of his Latin and French translations of the Bible) had especially to suffer.

Beza continued to maintain the closest relations with Reformed France. He was the moderator of the general synod which met in April 1571 at La Rochelle and decided not to abolish church discipline or to acknowledge the civil government as head of the Church, as the Paris minister Jean Morel and the philosopher Pierre Ramus demanded; it also decided to confirm anew the Calvinistic doctrine of the Lord's Supper (by the expression: "substance of the body of Christ") against Zwinglianism, which caused a dispute between Beza and Ramus and Heinrich Bullinger.

In May 1572 he took an important part in the national synod at Nîmes. He was also interested in the controversies which concerned the Augsburg Confession in Germany, especially after 1564, on the doctrine of the Person of Christ and the sacrament, and published several works against Joachim Westphal, Tilemann Heshusius, Nikolaus Selnecker, Johannes Brenz, and Jakob Andrea. This caused him to be hated by all those who adhered to Lutheranism in opposition to Melanchthon, especially after 1571.

=== The Colloquy of Montbéliard ===
The last polemical conflict of importance Beza encountered from the Lutherans was at the Colloquy of Montbéliard, 14–27 March 1586, (which is also called the Mompelgard Colloquium) to which he had been invited by the Lutheran Count Frederick of Württemberg at the wish of the French-speaking and Reformed residents as well as by French noblemen who had fled to Montbéliard. As a matter of course the intended union which was the purpose of the colloquy was not brought about; nevertheless it called forth serious developments within the Reformed Church.

On the Lutheran side appeared Andrea and Lucas Osiander, assisted by the two political counsellors, Hans Wolf von Anweil and Frederich Schiitz; on the part of the Reformed, Beza, Abraham Musculus (pastor at Berne), Anton Fajus (deacon at Geneva), Peter Hybner (professor of the Greek language at Berne), Claudius Alberius (professor of philosophy at Lausanne), and the two counsellors, Samuel Meyer, of Berne, and Anton Marisius, of Geneva.

When the edition of the acts of the colloquy, as prepared by Jakob Andrea, was published, Samuel Huber, of Burg near Bern, who belonged to the Lutheranizing faction of the Swiss clergy, took so great offense at the supralapsarian doctrine of predestination propounded at Montbéliard by Beza and Musculus that he felt it to be his duty to denounce Musculus to the magistrates of Bern as an innovator in doctrine. To adjust the matter, the magistrates arranged a colloquy between Huber and Musculus (2 September 1587), in which the former represented the universalism, the latter the particularism, of grace.

As the colloquy was resultless, a debate was arranged at Bern on 15–18 April 1588, at which the defense of the accepted system of doctrine was at the start put into Beza's hands. The three delegates of the Swiss cantons who presided at the debate declared in the end that Beza had substantiated the teaching propounded at Montbéliard as the orthodox one, and Huber was dismissed from his office.

=== Later years ===
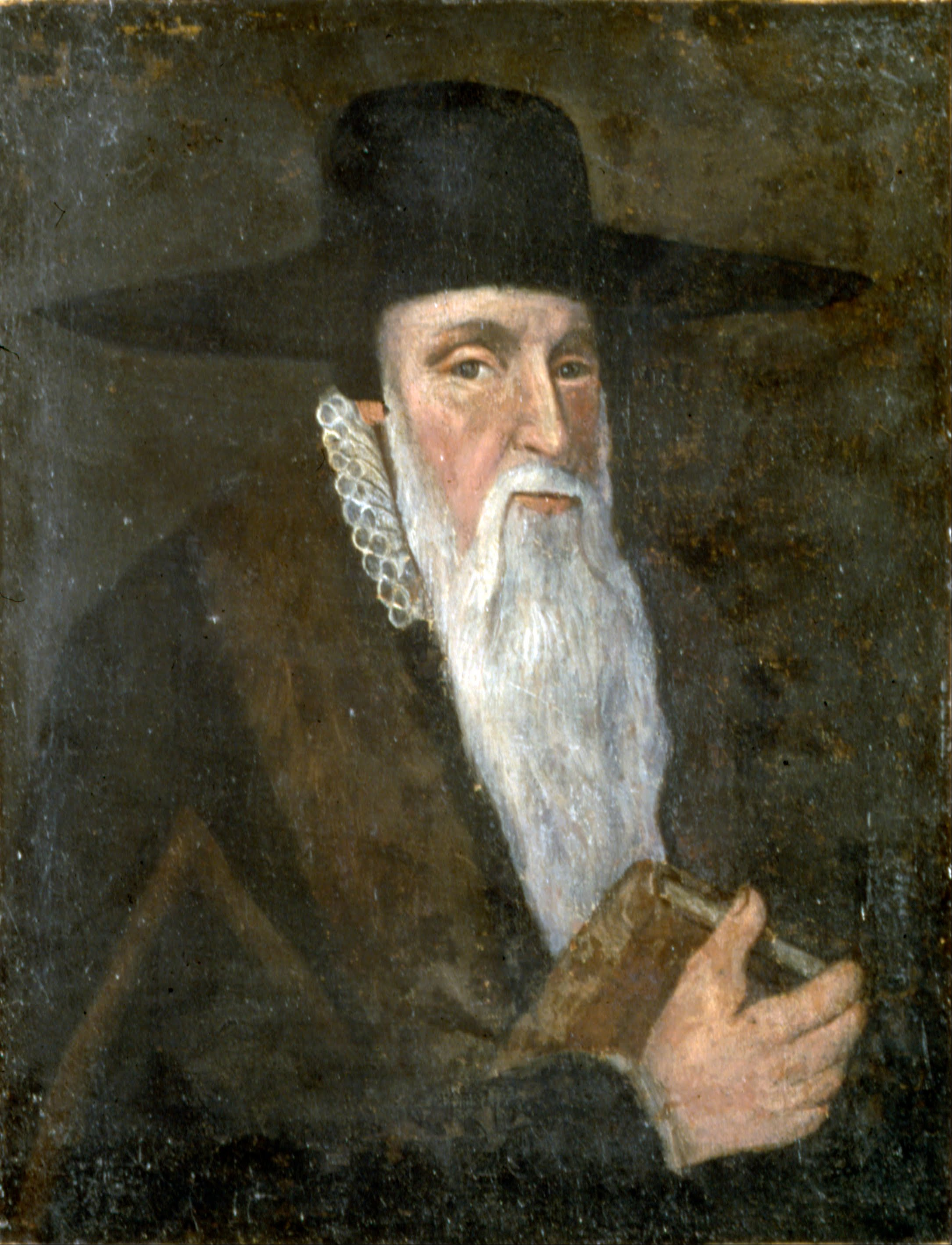
Théodore De Beza by an unknown artist, inscribed in 1605

After that time Beza's activity was confined more and more to the affairs of his home. His wife Claudine had died childless in 1588 after forty years of marriage, a few days before he went to the Bern Disputation. He contracted, on the advice of his friends, a second marriage with the widow Caterina del Piano, a Protestant refugee from Asti, Piedmont, in order to have a helpmate in his declining years. Up to his sixty-fifth year he enjoyed excellent health, but after that a gradual sinking of his vitality became perceptible. He was active in teaching until January 1597.

The saddest experience in his old days was the conversion of King Henry IV of France to Catholicism, in spite of his most earnest exhortations (1593). In 1596, a false report was spread by the Jesuits in Germany, France, England, and Italy that Beza and the Church of Geneva had returned into the bosom of Rome, and Beza replied in a satire which showed that he still possessed his old fire of thought and vigor of expression.

Beza died on 13 October 1605 in Geneva. He was not buried, like Calvin, in the general cemetery at Plainpalais (for the Savoyards had threatened to abduct his body to Rome), but, at the direction of the magistrates, at Saint-Pierre Cathedral in Geneva.

== Literary works ==
=== Humanistic and historical writings ===
In Beza's literary activity as well as in his life, distinction must be made between the period of the humanist (which ended with the publication of his Juvenilia) and that of the ecclesiastic. Combining his pastoral and literary gifts, Beza wrote the first drama produced in French, Abraham Sacrifiant; a play that is an antecedent to the work of Racine and is still occasionally produced today. Later productions like the humanistic, biting, satirical Passavantius and his Complainte de Messire Pierre Lizet... prove that in later years he occasionally went back to his first love. In his old age he published his Cato censorius (1591), and revised his Poemata, from which he purged juvenile eccentricities.

Of his historiographical works, aside from his Icones (1580), which have only an iconographical value, mention may be made of the famous Histoire ecclesiastique des Eglises reformes au Royaume de France (1580), and his biography of Calvin, with which must be named his edition of Calvin's Epistolae et responsa (1575).

=== Theological works ===
But all these humanistic and historical studies are surpassed by his theological productions (contained in Tractationes theologicae). In these Beza appears the perfect pupil or the alter ego of Calvin. His view of life is deterministic and the basis of his religious thinking is the predestinate recognition of the necessity of all temporal existence as an effect of the absolute, eternal, and immutable will of God, so that even the fall of the human race appears to him essential to the divine plan of the world. Beza, in tabular form, thoroughly elucidates the religious views which emanated from a fundamental supralapsarian mode of thought. This he added to his highly instructive treatise Summa totius Christianismi.

Beza's De vera excommunicatione et Christiano presbyterio (1590), written as a response to Thomas Erastus's Explicatio gravissimae quaestionis utrum excommunicatio (1589) contributed an important defense of the right of ecclesiastical authorities (rather than civil authorities) to excommunicate.

=== Beza's Greek New Testament ===
Of no less importance are the contributions of Beza to Biblical scholarship. In 1565 he issued an edition of the Greek New Testament, accompanied in parallel columns by the text of the Vulgate and a translation of his own (already published as early as 1556, though our earliest extant edition dates to 1559). Annotations were added, also previously published, but now he greatly enriched and enlarged them.

In the preparation of this edition of the Greek text, but much more in the preparation of the second edition which he brought out in 1582, Beza may have availed himself of the help of two very valuable manuscripts. One is known as the Codex Bezae or Cantabrigensis, and was later presented by Beza to the University of Cambridge, where it remains in the Cambridge University Library; the second is the Codex Claromontanus, which Beza had found in Clermont (now in the Bibliothèque Nationale de France in Paris).

It was not, however, to these sources that Beza was chiefly indebted, but rather to the previous edition of the eminent Robert Estienne (1550), itself based in great measure upon one of the later editions of Erasmus. Beza's labours in this direction were exceedingly helpful to those who came after. The same thing may be asserted with equal truth of his Latin version and of the copious notes with which it was accompanied. The former is said to have been published over a hundred times.

Although some contend that Beza's view of the doctrine of predestination exercised an overly dominant influence upon his interpretation of the Scriptures, there is no question that he added much to a clear understanding of the New Testament.

== See also ==
- Franciscus Junius (the elder)
- Immanuel Tremellius
- Monarchomachs
- Supralapsarianism

== Notes ==
Religious titles
Preceded by John Calvin	Moderator of the Genevan Company of Pastors; 1564–1580	Vacant Replaced by weekly presidency Title next held by Simon Goulart
Academic offices
Preceded by John Calvin	Chair of theology at the Genevan Academy; 1558–1599; With: John Calvin (1558-1564); Nicolas Colladon (1566-1571); Charles Perrot (1572, 1586, 1598); Lambert Daneau (1572, 1576-1581)	Succeeded by Giovanni Diodati
