= Pierre Lizet =

French magistrate

Pierre Lizet (1482 – 17 June 1554) was a French magistrate.

He received his education in civil law and canon law. From 1529 to 1549, he was the president of the Parlement of Paris.

During the spread of Protestantism in France, the French Parliament started to evaluate appeals against sentences written by the Roman Catholic diocesan courts. In selected cases, bishops were censored by the civil legislative assembly when their decisions were declared to be heretical. In 1525, Guillaume Poyet, future lawyer of the king of France, asked the Parliament to suspend the bishop of Angers Francis de Rohan (1480–1536) from its functions. It was the first case discussed in France. The bishop was guilty of simony because he had allowed his priests to be paid by Christian believers in order to administer sacraments to them. Lizet compared simoniac bishops to the heretics and asked the royal court to replace the ecclesiastical jurisdiction in similar cases. Jean Guibert was the first French citizen to be locked up in a monastery by order of the king and then to be liberated in 1527. Two years before, his judicial case was instrumental to attribute to the king the power of interdicting Roman Catholic bishops from their local jurisdiction in the cases of heresy.

At the time of his death, Theodore Beza wrote the following French epitaph for him:

Hercules desconfit iadis
Serpens, geans, & autres bestes.
Roland, Oliuier, Amadis
Feirent voler lances & testes.
Mais, n'en desplaise a leurs conquestes,
Liset, tout sot & ignorant,
A plus faict que le demourant
Des preux de nations quelconques,
Car il feit mourir en mourant
La plus grand'beste qui fut oncques.
