= Consensus Tigurinus =

Pan-reformed document on the sacraments

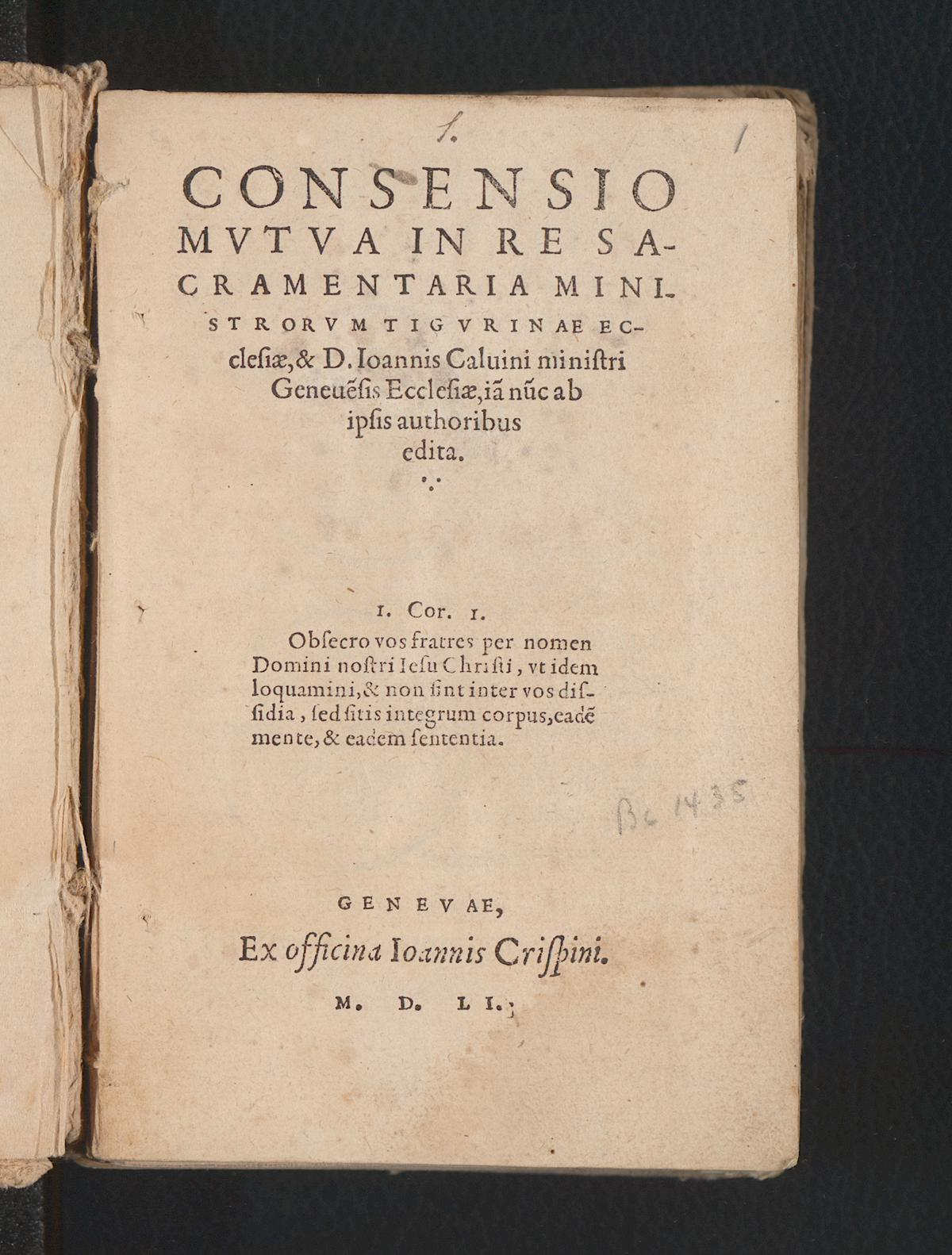
Title page of 1551 Geneva edition

The Consensus Tigurinus or Consensus of Zurich was a Protestant document written in 1549 by John Calvin and Heinrich Bullinger.

The document was intended to bring unity to the Protestant churches on their doctrines of the sacraments, particularly the Lord's Supper. Calvin’s views stood between the Lutheran view of Real Presence and the Zwinglian view of symbolism. He wrote the first draft of the document in November 1548, with notes by Bullinger.

== Content ==
The document covered 26 Articles of Reformed Sacramentology. Calvin emphasized that there is great meaning in sacramental symbols but it does not have power to act on its own.

The document taught:

that the Sacraments are not in and of themselves effective and conferring grace, but that God, through the Holy Spirit, acts through them as means; that the internal effect appears only in the elect; that the good of the Sacraments consists in leading us to Christ, and being instruments of the grace of God, which is sincerely offered to all; that in baptism we receive the remission of sins, although this proceeds primarily not from baptism, but from the blood of Christ; that in the Lord's Supper we eat and drink the body and blood of Christ, not, however, by means of a carnal presence of Christ's human nature, which is in heaven, but by the power of the Holy Spirit and the devout elevation of our soul to heaven.

== Reception ==
Calvin sent the document to the Swiss churches, but the Synod at Bern opposed Calvin's view strongly and continued to do so until after Calvin's death. In May 1549, Calvin met with William Farel and Bullinger in Zürich, and the three revised the document into its final form, which was published in Zürich and Geneva in 1551. The Latin original was translated into German by Bullinger and French by Calvin.

The Consensus Tigurinus attempted to coalesce the Calvinist and the advanced Zwinglian doctrines while standing opposed to transubstantiation, the Roman Catholic view, and sacramental union, the Lutheran view. It was accepted by the churches in Zürich, Geneva, St. Gallen, Schaffhausen, the Grisons, Neuchâtel, and eventually by Basel, and brought them into harmony with one another. It was "favorably received" in France and parts of Germany, but while Melanchthon said that he understood the Swiss for the first time and would no longer write against them, it was attacked by the Gnesio-Lutheran Joachim Westphal and "became the innocent occasion of the second sacramental war."

The Consensus was well received in England, with Martin Bucer praising it and Peter Martyr Vermigli endorsing it.

Calvin refused to answer the published attacks until these started to strain the Lutheran-Reformed relations, particularly Westphal's claim that those writing in support of the document were Sacramentarians. According to Westphal in his Farrago of Confused and Divergent Opinions on the Lord's Supper, Zwingli and Calvin were heretics since they rejected the position of the literal eating of Christ's body in the Lord's Supper.
