= Jérôme-Hermès Bolsec =

French theologian

Jérôme-Hermès Bolsec, also known as Hieronymus Bolsec (? – c. 1584) was a French Carmelite theologian and physician, who became a Protestant and controversialist, later returning to the Catholic Church.

== Life ==
A sermon which he preached at Paris aroused misgivings in Catholic circles regarding the soundness of his ideas, and Bolsec left Paris. Having separated from the Catholic Church around 1545, he took refuge at the Court of Renée, duchess of Ferrara, who was favourably disposed towards persons holding Protestant views. Here he married, and began the study of medicine around 1550, settling as a physician at Veigy, near Geneva.

The 1913 Catholic Encyclopedia describes a 1551 confrontation between Bolsec and John Calvin. Bolsec, attending a regular Friday lecture series in Geneva, interrupted Jean de Saint André's discussion of predestination to argue with him on the topic. Calvin, who also happened to be in attendance, joined in the dispute. The Catholic Encyclopedia attributes Bolsec's later arrest and exile from Geneva to Calvin's influence.

In 1555 he was also driven from Thonon, in the Bernese territory, where he had retired. He went to Paris and sought admission into the ministry of the Reformed Church. However, his opinions were not deemed sufficiently orthodox from a reformed perspective. He was asked for a declaration of faith, but refused.

He went to Lausanne in c. 1563, but as the signing of the Confession of Bern was made a condition of his residence there, he preferred to return to France. Shortly after this, he recanted his Protestant beliefs, and was reconciled with the Catholic Church.

== Works ==
He published biographies of the two Genevan reformers, Calvin and Theodore Beza (1519–1605). These works are violent in tone, and their historical statements cannot always be relied on. They are "Histoire de la vie, des moeurs . . . de Jean Calvin" (Lyon and Paris, 1577; published in Latin at Cologne in 1580; German tr. 1581); "Histoire de la vie et des mœurs de Th. de Bèze" (Paris, 1582). The life of Calvin was edited by L. F. Chastel in 1875 with extracts from the life of Beza.

In Alister McGrath's biography of Calvin, he states,

"... Jerome Bolsec, with whom Calvin crossed swords in 1551... published his Vie de Calvin at Lyons in June 1577. Calvin, according to Bolsec, was irredeemably tedious and malicious, bloodthirsty and frustrated. He treated his own words as if they were the word of God, and allowed himself to be worshipped as God. In addition to frequently falling victim to his homosexual tendencies, he had a habit of indulging himself sexually with any female within walking distance. According to Bolsec, Calvin resigned his benefices at Noyon on account of the public exposure of his homosexual activities. Bolsec's biography makes much more interesting reading than those of Theodore Beza and Nicolas Colladon; nevertheless, his work rests largely upon unsubstantiated anonymous oral reports deriving from 'trustworthy individuals' (personnes digne de foy), which modern scholarship has found of questionable merit."

Thomas Henry Dyer's biography of Calvin offers the following context,

Bolsec ... affirms that the real cause of M. de Fallals' leaving Geneva was, that Calvin had solicited the chastity of his wife ... Calvin appeared before the council of that city (Berne) on the 17th of February, 1552, for the purpose of clearing himself from certain calumnies.
No provocation can excuse Bolsec for bringing these infamous charges; yet he was probably incited by Beza's "Life of Calvin" to insert them in his own biography of Calvin. In the work alluded to, Beza charges Bolsec, after he had returned to the Roman Catholic communion, with prostituting his wife to the canons of Autun; an imputation, the truth of which is liable to considerable suspicion, from the virulence displayed by Beza in persecuting Bolsec, and from the fact that that writer, and even Calvin himself, were not always very scrupulous in ascertaining the truth of what they alleged against their adversaries. It is certain that Beza's "Life of Calvin" appeared before Bolsec's, which was not published till many years after Calvin's death.
