= Franco-Gallia =

Franco-Gallia: Or, An Account of the Ancient Free State of France, and Most Other Parts of Europe, Before the Loss of Their Liberties is a French constitutional history treatise published by François Hotman in 1573 that argued for representative government and an elective monarchy.

== Publication ==
Hotman was a Protestant Huguenot refugee in Geneva where he was professor of Roman law. The French speaking but Protestant city was still strongly influenced by the recently deceased John Calvin. The book was written in response to the St. Bartholomew's Day massacre and published in Latin in Geneva in 1573. In 1574 a French translation by Simon Goulart was issued in Cologne under the title La Gaule françoise.

It was translated into English by Robert Molesworth.

== Content ==
The book represents an early foundation of the developing theory of representative democracy. It was the first “political program” of the Huguenots in the event of their rise to power. In it, he presents an ideal of Protestant statesmanship and argues that the crown of France is not hereditary but elective, and that the people have the right to depose and create kings.

Hotman maintained that sovereignty originated with the people rather than the king with the Carolingians being an elected monarchy, meaning that the people had delegated part of their authority but had not surrendered their sovereignty. The lending of power meant that it was essential that the king regularly consult the Estates General who had a line of continuity with the Carolingian assemblies in which sovereignty resided. If the king fails to govern with the Estates, he no longer governs for the common good, and the social pact is broken. The rebellion of subjects is therefore legitimate. This theory of popular sovereignty challenged the theory of the divine right of kings.

== Political impact ==
The book was controversial from the time it was published and there were several responses and refutations, notably Ad Franc. Hotomani... Responsio, attributed either to Jean Papire Masson or to Antoine Matharel in 1575, and Contra Othomani Francogalliam Libellus by Pierre Turrel in 1576. At first it was not popular with either the Catholic or Protestants, although both would cite it if it suited their arguments - for example the Jesuits cited it in their pamphlet war against Henry IV of France.

His theory has been compared with Rousseau’s Social Contract.

Fidel Castro's 1953 speech History Will Absolve Me cited Hotman: “The French writer, François Hotman, maintained that between the government and its subjects there is a bond or contract, and that the people may rise in rebellion against the tyranny of government when the latter violates that pact."

== Sources ==
- Castro, Fidel (16 October 1953). "History Will Absolve Me". Marxists Internet Archive. Marxists.org.
- Gordon, Alexander (1911). "Hotman, François" . In Chisholm, Hugh (ed.). Encyclopædia Britannica. Vol. 13 (11th ed.). Cambridge University Press. p. 804.
- François Hotman, "Of the Constable and Peers of France", Franco-Gallia: Or, An Account of the Ancient Free State of France, and Most Other Parts of Europe, Before the Loss of Their Liberties.[1574], 2nd ed. 1721 English translation from the original Latin. Project Gutenberg e-text # 17894.
- Robbins, Caroline (1959). The Eighteenth-Century Commonwealthman: Studies in the Transmission, Development, and Circumstance of English Liberal Thought from the Restoration of Charles II until the War with the Thirteen Colonies (1961 ed.).
