= Right of Magistrates =

1574 work by Theodore Beza

The Right of Magistrates (French: Du droit des magistrats; Latin: De jure magistratuum) is a 1574 work written by Theodore Beza, and anonymously "published by those from Magdeburg of 1550", as a polemical contribution to the pamphlet literature of the French Wars of Religion. It emphatically protested against French state tyranny in religious matters, and affirmed the resistance theory that it is legitimate for a people to oppose an unworthy magistracy in a practical manner and if necessary to use weapons and depose them.

== See also ==
- Lesser magistrate
