= Confession of the Unity of the Bohemian Brethren of 1535 =

Doctrinal statement of the Moravian Church

Confession of the Unity of the Bohemian Brethren of 1535 or Brethren's confession is doctrinal statement of the Unity of the Brethren.

The confession was introduced to the king Ferdinand I in 1535 and published in Czech in 1536 and in Latin with Martin Luther's preface in 1538.

The confession consists of a long apologetic preface and of twenty articles. It represents traditional theological concerns of the Unity, but is inspired by the Augsburg Confession too.

In later editions the brethren made some changes, reflecting the theological drift of the Unity (significant changes had been done especially in Latin Wittenberg edition from 1573).

The Brethren's confession is sometimes referred as Bohemian Confession. It should not be merged with the Bohemian Confession from 1575, which is different text.

== Bibliography ==
- Craig D. Atwood: The Theology of the Czech Brethren from Hus to Comenius. Pennsylvania State University Press, 2009, p. 273-294.
