= Lambert Daneau =

French jurist and theologian

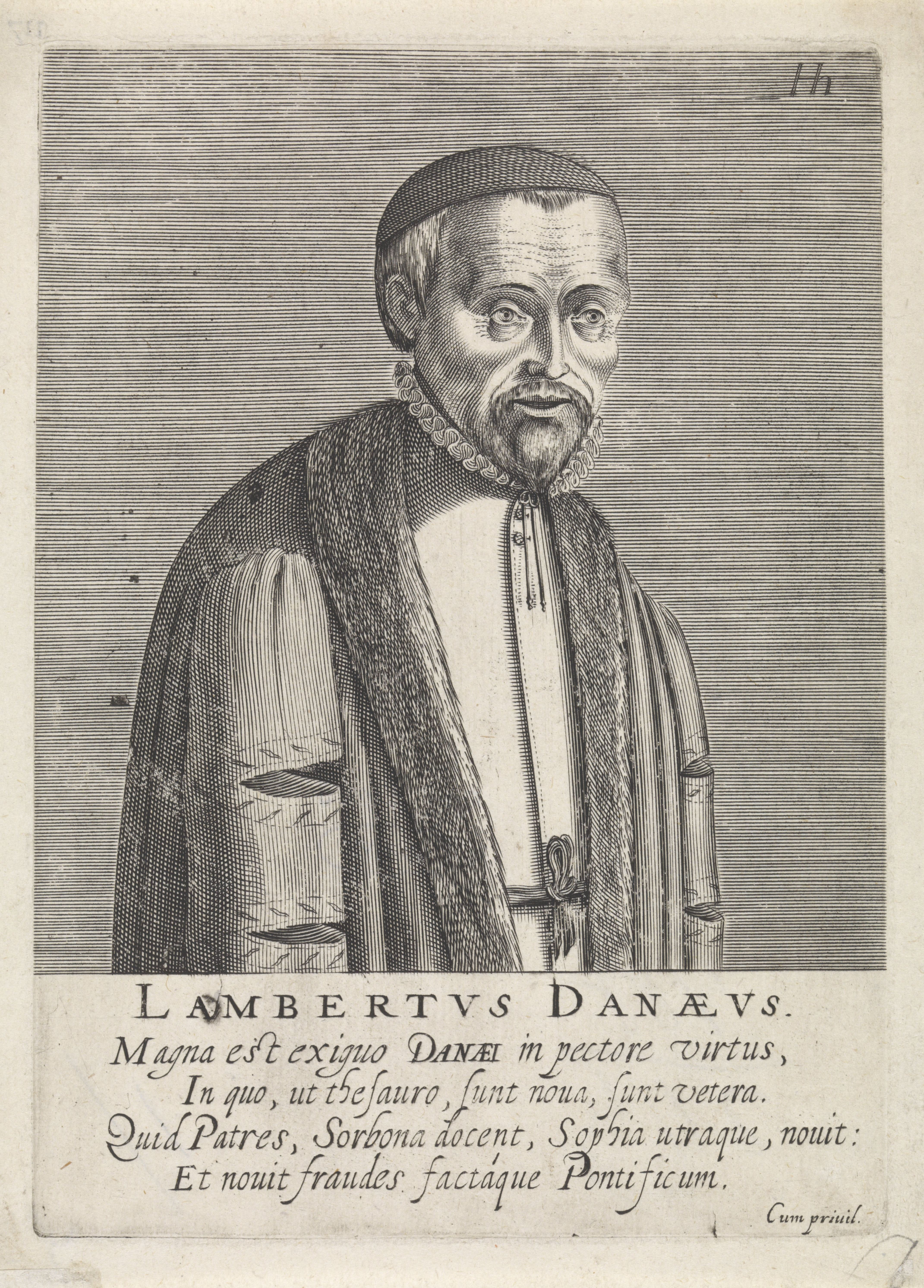

Lambert Daneau (c. 1530 – c. 1590) was a French jurist and Calvinist theologian.

== Life ==
He was born at Beaugency-sur-Loire, and educated at Orléans. He studied Greek under Adrianus Turnebus, and then law in Orléans from 1553. He moved to Bourges in 1559; he was particularly influenced by François Hotman, and by Anne du Bourg, who was executed in that year for heresy.

He went to Geneva first in 1560, and studied at the Genevan Academy. He then became a pastor in Gien. After eight fruitful further years in Geneva from 1572, he made a reputation as preacher and theological writer. He left for a position in the University of Leiden. He taught also in Ghent, Orthez, Lescar, and Castres.

== Views ==
Scott Manetsch describes Daneau as a "champion of Calvinist orthodoxy, with the expansive vision of expanding and extending the domains of secular knowledge... on the basis of Scripture through the use of the scholastic method of dialectic." Daneau wrote on many subjects, including a commentary on Peter Lombard's Sentences, and a political treatise justifying armed resistance against tyranny.

Daneau wrote a book on witchcraft in French, "Les sorciers"(1574) that was translated into Latin the following year as Dialogus de veneficiis (1575) and into English by Thomas Twyne as A Dialogue of Witches (1575). His writing on the topic of witchcraft caused trouble for him in Leiden.

His Physica christiana (1576) argued for a Scriptural basis for physics. It was translated by Twyne as The Wonderfull Workmanship of the World (1578).

== Notes ==
- Olivier Fatio, "Lambert Daneau 1530-1595" in Jill Raitt, ed., Shapers of Religious Traditions in Germany, Switzerland, and Poland, 1560-1600 (New Haven: Yale University Press, 1981), pages 105-119.
