= François Hotman =

French lawyer and writer (1524–1590)

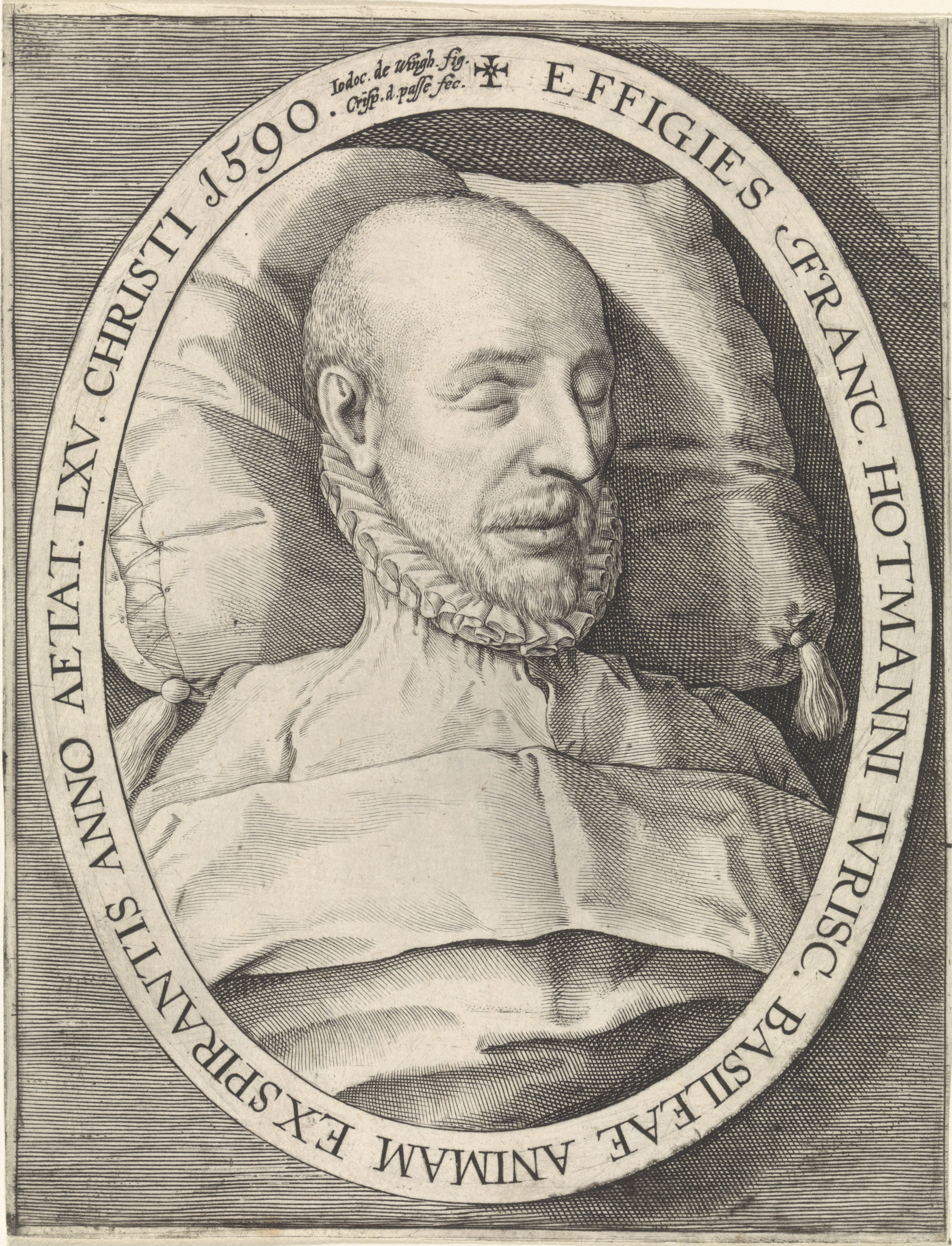
François Hotman on his deathbed, after Joos van Winghe

François Hotman (23 August 1524 – 12 February 1590) was a French lawyer and writer, associated with the legal humanists and with the monarchomaques, who struggled against absolute monarchy. His first name is often written 'Francis' in English. His surname is Latinized by himself as Hotomanus, by others as Hotomannus and Hottomannus. He has been called "one of the first modern revolutionaries".

== Biography ==
He was born in Paris, the eldest son of Pierre Hotman (1485–1554), Seigneur de Villers-St-Paul, jure uxoris and Paule de Marle, heiress of the Seigneurie de Vaugien and Villers-St-Paul. His grandfather Lambert Hotman, a Silesian burgher, emigrating from Emmerich, (in the Duchy of Cleves), had left his native country to go to France with Engelbert, Count of Nevers. His father Pierre was a lawyer, practising at the Paris Bar. Around the time of Francois' birth, Pierre was appointed to an official position in the Department of Woods and Forests (known as the 'Marble Table'). By this time, the Hotman family, that is, Pierre, his brothers and uncles, were one of the most important legal families in France.

Pierre, a zealous Catholic and a counsellor of the parlement of Paris, intended his son for the law, and sent him at the age of fifteen to the University of Orléans. He obtained his doctorate in three years, and returned to Paris. The work of a practising lawyer was not to his taste; he turned to jurisprudence and literature, and in 1546 was appointed lecturer in Roman Law at the University of Paris. The fortitude of Anne Dubourg under torture made him a Huguenot Protestant.

Giving up a career on which he had entered with high repute, he went in 1547 to Lyon. In the summer of 1548, at Bourges, he married Claude Aubelin (daughter of Guillaume Aubelin, Sieur de La Rivière and Françoise de Brachet). She and her father, like himself, were refugees. In October 1548, he moved to Geneva to be John Calvin's secretary. He went to Lausanne, and was elected to that university in February 1550. There, on the recommendation of Calvin, he was appointed professor of belles lettres and history. He was made a citizen of Geneva in 1553, his eldest child Jean was born there in 1552. On the invitation of the magistracy, he lectured at Strasbourg on law in October 1555, and became professor in June 1556, superseding François Baudouin, who had been his colleague in Paris. He was a member, from Strasbourg, to the Colloquy of Worms on 11 September 1557.

His fame was such that overtures were made to him by the courts of Prussia and Hesse, and by Elizabeth I of England. Twice he visited Germany, in 1556 accompanying Calvin to the Diet of Frankfurt. He was entrusted with confidential missions from the Huguenot leaders to German potentates, carrying at one time credentials from Catherine de' Medici. In 1560 he was one of the principal instigators of the Amboise conspiracy; in September of that year he was with Antoine of Navarre at Nérac. In 1562 he attached himself to Louis, prince of Condé. In 1564 he became professor of civil law at Valence, retrieving by his success the reputation of its university. In 1567 he succeeded Jacques Cujas in the chair of jurisprudence at Bourges.

Five months later his house and library were wrecked by a Catholic mob; he fled by Orléans to Paris, where Michel de l'Hôpital made him historiographer to king Charles IX. As agent for the Huguenots, he was sent to Blois to negotiate the peace of 1568. He returned to Bourges, but was driven away by the outbreak of hostilities. At Sancerre, during its siege, he composed his Consolatio (published in 1593). The peace of 1570 restored him to Bourges. In 1572 the St. Bartholomew's Day massacre created a wave of Huguenot refugees including his family who left France for Geneva where he became professor of Roman law. On the approach of the duke of Savoy he removed to Basel in 1579. In 1580 he was appointed councillor of state to Henry of Navarre. The plague sent him in 1582 to Montbéliard, where his wife Claude died in 1583. Returning to Geneva in 1584 he developed a kind of scientific turn, dabbling in alchemy and the research for the philosopher's stone. He was admitted to the Privy Council of King Henry in December 1585. In 1589, he finally retired to Basel, where he died, leaving two sons and four daughters; he was buried in the cathedral.

== Work ==
François Hotman was a home-loving and genuinely pious man (as his Consolatio shows). His constant removals were inspired less by fear for himself than for his family, and he had a constitutional desire for peace. He did much for 16th century jurisprudence, having a critical knowledge of Roman sources, and a fine Latin style. He broached the idea of a national code of French law. His works were very numerous, beginning with his De gradibus cognationis (1546), and including a treatise on the Eucharist (1566); a treatise (Anti-Tribonian, 1567) to show that French law could not be based on Justinian; a life of Coligny (1575); a polemic (Brutum fulmen, 1585) directed against a bull of Sixtus V, with many other works on law, history, politics, and classical learning.

His most important work, the Franco-Gallia was published in 1573 when he was in Geneva. It argued for representative government and an elective monarchy, drawing comparisons with Rousseau's Social Contract.

== Family ==
He had seven children with his wife:

1. Jean Hotman, Marquis de Villers-St-Paul, Count de Hotman d 1634. He married Renée de St-Martin, the former lady-in-waiting to Penelope Devereux, Lady Rich
2. Theages
3. Daniel, Prêtre de l'Oratoire
4. Marie Strausbourg
5. Pierre, Counsellor to the King
6. Suzanne married first to John Menteith of Scotland, and secondly to Antoine d'Ailleboust, counsellor to Henri II, Prince of Condé. Their son Louis d'Ailleboust de Coulonge, was the governor of New France 1648–1651.
7. Theodora m Jean Burquenon, Secretary of this same Prince of Condé.

== Bibliography ==
- A recent reprint of the 1705 English translation of Franco-Gallia:

François Hotman [1574] (2007). Franco-Gallia (Large Print Edition): Or An Account of the Ancient Free State of France. BiblioBazaar. ISBN 978-1-4346-1376-9.

- A modern English translation and the original Latin text of Franco-Gallia:

Salmon, J. H. M.; Hotman, François; Giesey, Ralph E. (1972). Francogallia. Cambridge, UK: Cambridge University Press. ISBN 0-521-08379-6.

- François Hotman (1980). Antitribonian, ou, Discours d'un grand et renomme iurisconsulte de nostre temps sur l'estude des loix (Images et temoins de l'age classique). [Saint-Etienne]: Université de Saint-Etienne. ISBN 2-86724-008-5.

== See also ==
- Monarchomaques
