= Simon Goulart =

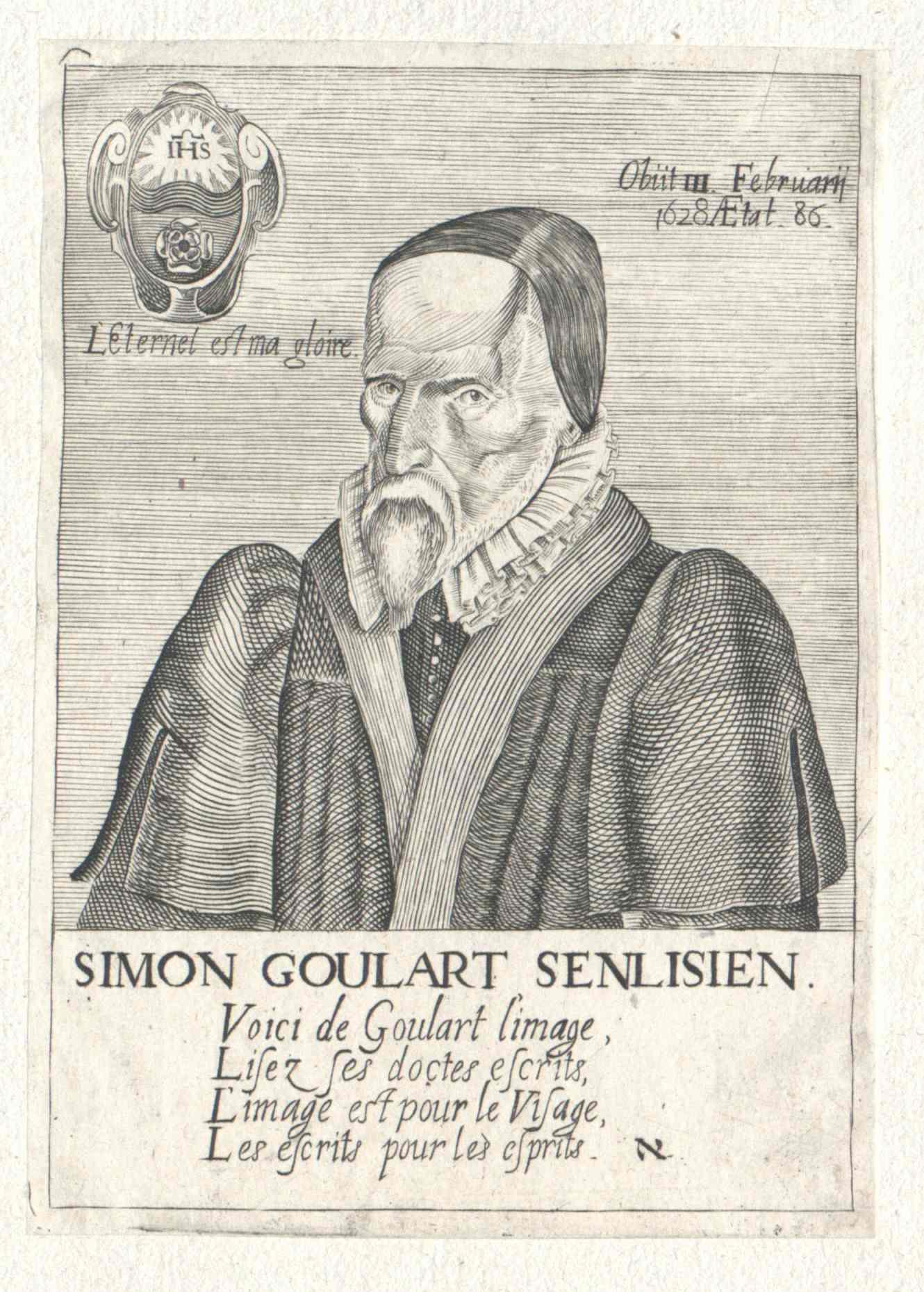

Simon Goulart (20 October 1543 – 3 February 1628) was a French Reformed theologian, humanist and poet.

== Life ==
Goulart was born at Senlis in northern France. He first studied law, then adopted the Reformed faith and became one of the pastors at Geneva in the Republic of Geneva (1566). He was called to Antwerp, to Orange, to Montpellier and to Nîmes as minister, and to Lausanne as professor; but remained at Geneva and became a citizen.

According to Scott Manetsch, Goulart was an "eloquent but controversial preacher, unafraid to speak out against the ills of society, whether they be promiscuous styles of clothing, miscarriages of public justice, or the hypocrisy of public officials." In 1595 he preached aggressively against Gabrielle d'Estrées, the favorite of Henry IV of France. He was put in prison by order of the Council of Geneva; after eight days he was released, although the French ambassador had demanded a more severe punishment.

When Theodore Beza died in 1605, Goulart took over as leader of the Company of Pastors. He died at Geneva.

== Works ==
Simon Goulart wrote a number of books on history and theology. He made additions to Jean Crespin's Histoire des Martyrs (Geneva, 1608); he wrote also Recueil contenant les choses les plus mémorables advenues sous la Ligue (6 vols., 1590–99), and Recueil des choses mémorables sous le régne de Henri IV (1598).

Religious titles
Preceded by Theodore Beza	President of the Genevan Company of Pastors; 1607–1612	Office abolished, replaced by weekly rotating presidency
