= Geneva =

City in Switzerland

Geneva Genève (French)
- Municipality
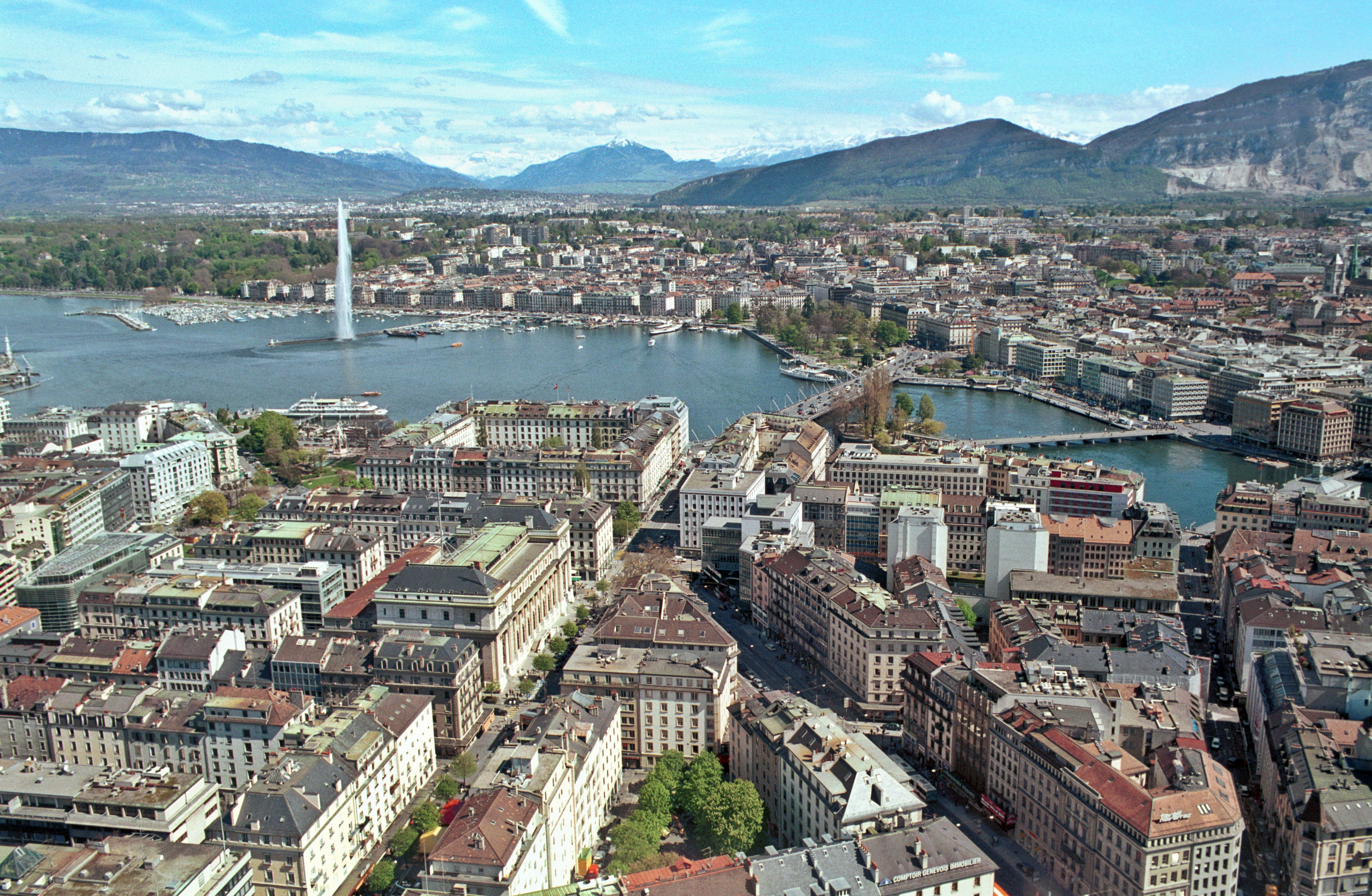
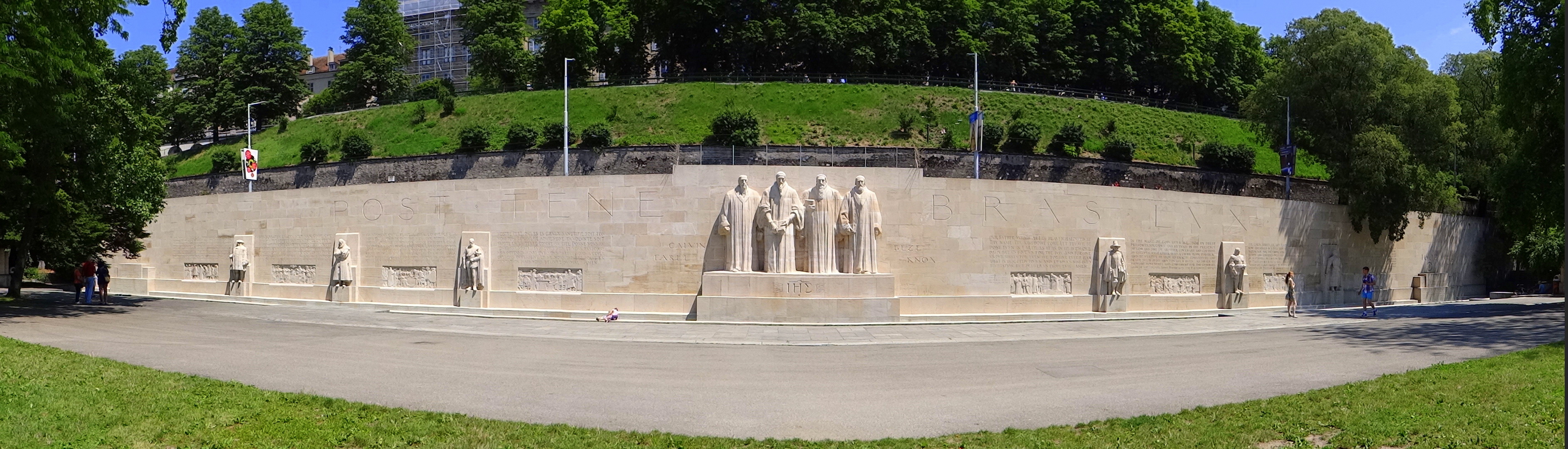
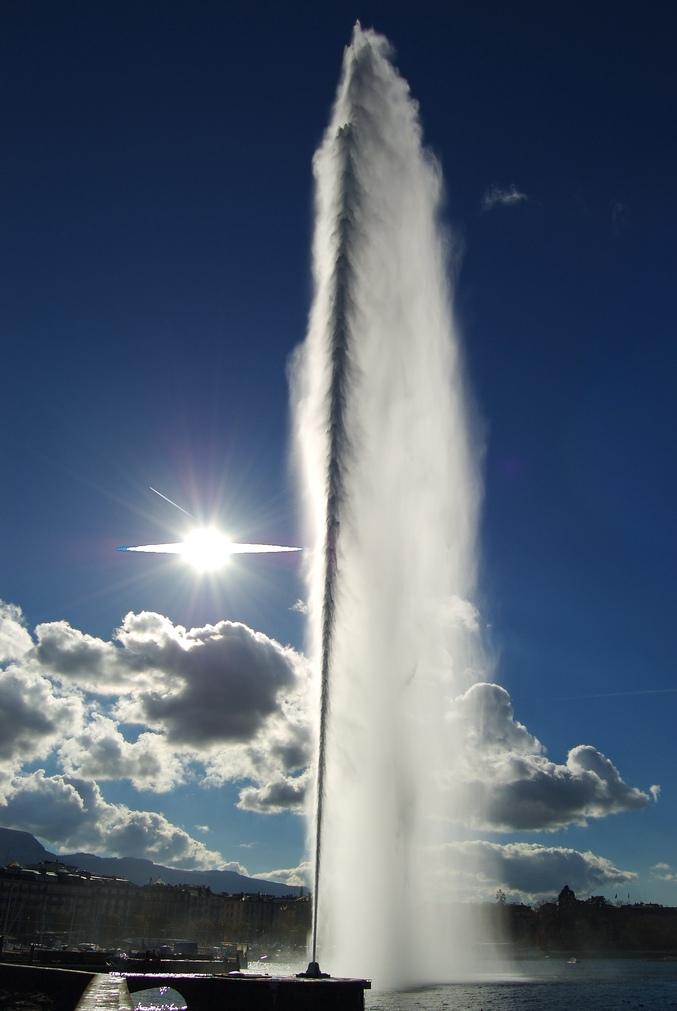
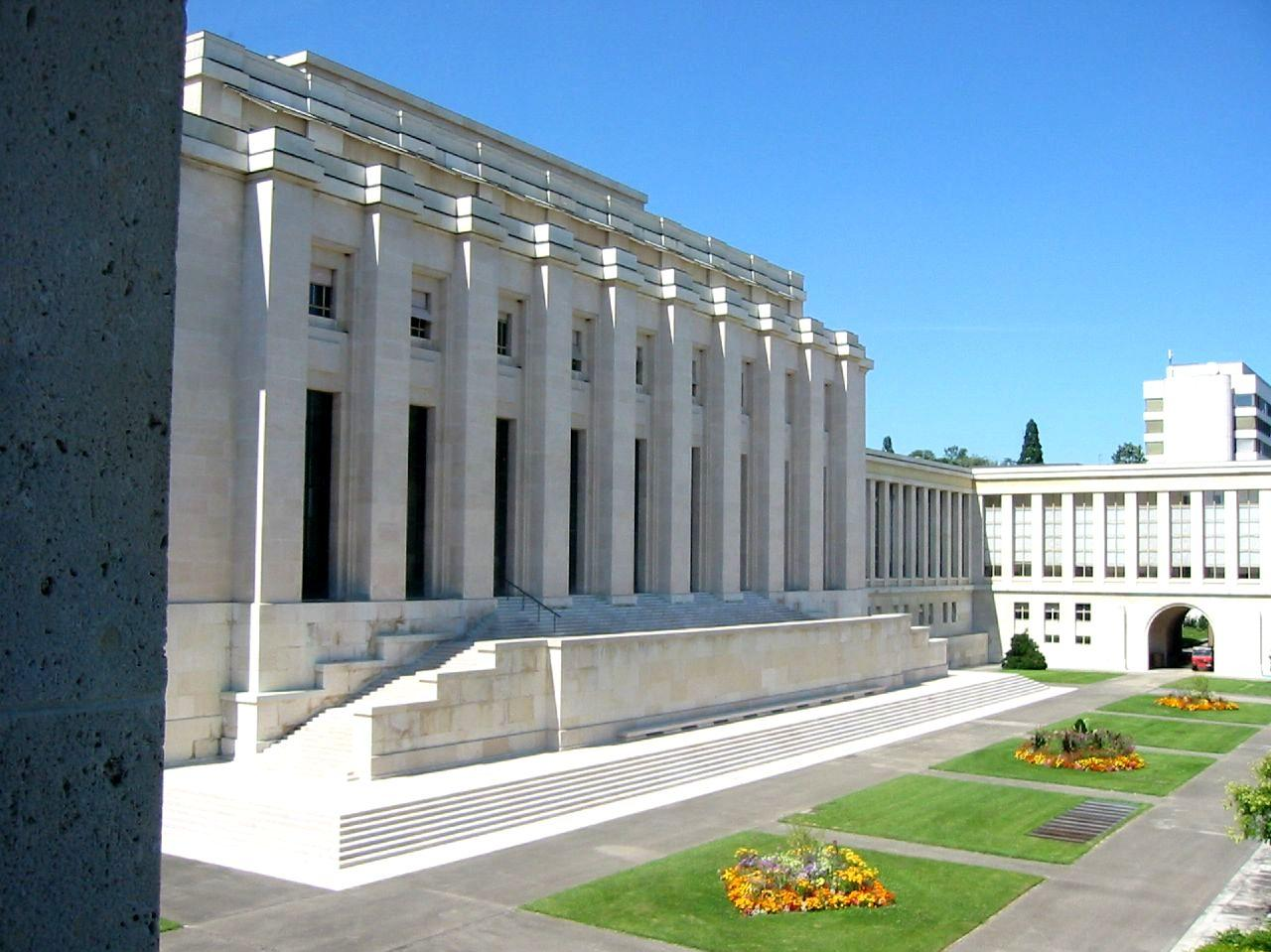
- Geneva and Lake Geneva Reformation Wall Jet d'Eau Palace of Nations Logo Flag Coat of arms
- Location of Geneva
- Location within Switzerland Location within Canton of Geneva
- Coordinates: 46°12′06″N 06°08′49″E
- Country: Switzerland
- Canton: Geneva
- District: None

Government
  - Executive: Conseil administratif with 5 members
  - Mayor: La Mairie (list); Alfonso Gomez Green Party of Switzerland (as of June 2023)
  - Parliament: Conseil municipal with 80 members

Area
  - Total: 15.86 km^{2} (6.12 sq mi)
- Elevation (Pont du Mont Blanc): 375 m (1,230 ft)
- Highest elevation (Chemin du Pommier): 457 m (1,499 ft)
- Lowest elevation (Le Rhône): 370 m (1,210 ft)

Population (December 2020)
  - Total: 203,856
  - Rank: 2nd
  - Density: 12,850/km^{2} (33,290/sq mi)
- Demonym(s): Genevan or Genevese; French: Genevois(e)
- Time zone: UTC+01:00 (CET)
  - Summer (DST): UTC+02:00 (CEST)
- Postal codes: 1200, or 1201–09 Genève, 1213 Petit-Lancy, 1227 Les Acacias
- SFOS number: 6621
- ISO 3166 code: CH-GE
- Surrounded by: Carouge, Chêne-Bougeries, Cologny, Lancy, Le Grand-Saconnex, Pregny-Chambésy, Vernier, Veyrier
- Twin towns: None
- Website: geneve.ch

Geneva (/dʒɪˈniːvə/ jin-EE-və; French: Genève [ʒ(ə)nɛv]) (Note: Arpitan: Genèva [dzəˈnɛva], with variant spellings; German: Genf [ɡɛnf]; Italian: Ginevra [dʒiˈneːvra]; Romansh: Genevra.) is the second-most populous city in Switzerland and the most populous in French-speaking Romandy. Situated in the southwest of the country, where the Rhône leaves Lake Geneva, it is the capital of the Republic and Canton of Geneva. Geneva is a global city, an international financial centre, and a worldwide centre for diplomacy, which has led to it being called the "Peace Capital".

It hosts the highest number of international organisations in the world, including the headquarters of many agencies of the United Nations, the International Committee of the Red Cross and the International Federation of Red Cross and Red Crescent Societies. It was where the Geneva Conventions on humanitarian treatment in war were signed, and, in the aftermath of World War I, it hosted the League of Nations. It shares a unique distinction with municipalities such as New York City, Bonn, Basel, and Strasbourg as a city which serves as the headquarters of at least one critical international organisation without being the capital of a country.

The city of Geneva (Ville de Genève) had a population of 203,856 in January 2021 within its municipal territory of 16 square kilometres (6.2 sq mi). The Geneva metropolitan area as officially defined by Eurostat, including suburbs and exurbs in Vaud and the French departments of Ain and Haute-Savoie, extends over 2,292 km^{2} (885 sq mi) and had a population of 1,053,436 in 2021. The Canton of Geneva, the Nyon District, and the ''Pôle métropolitain du Genevois français'' (a federation of eight French intercommunal councils), form the Grand Genève ("Greater Geneva"), a Local Grouping of Transnational Cooperation in charge of organising cooperation within the cross-border metropolitan area of Geneva. The Grand Genève GLCT extends over 1,996 km^{2} (771 sq mi) and had a population of 1,046,168, with 58.3% of them living in Switzerland, and 41.7% in France.

In 2025, Geneva was ranked as the world's fifteenth most important financial centre by the Global Financial Centres Index, and fourth in Europe behind London, Frankfurt and Dublin. In 2024, Geneva was ranked as the third most liveable city in the world by Mercer, as well as the fourth most expensive city in the world. In a UBS ranking of global cities in 2018, Geneva was ranked first for gross earnings, and fourth in purchasing power, and was also the second most expensive city.

== Etymology ==
The city was mentioned in Latin texts, by Caesar, with the spelling Genava, probably from the Celtic *genawa- from the stem *genu- ("mouth"), in the sense of an estuary, an etymology shared with the Italian port city of Genoa (in Italian Genova).

The medieval county of Geneva in Middle Latin was known as pagus major Genevensis or Comitatus Genevensis (also Gebennensis). After 1400 it became the Genevois province of Savoy (albeit not extending to the city proper, until the reformation of the seat of the Bishop of Geneva).

== History ==
Geneva was an Allobrogian border town, fortified against the Helvetii tribe, when the Roman Republic took it in 121 BC. It became Christian under the Late Roman Empire, and acquired its first bishop in the 5th century, having been connected to the Bishopric of Vienne in the 4th.

In the Middle Ages, Geneva was ruled by a count under the Holy Roman Empire until the late 14th century, when it was granted a charter giving it a high degree of self-governance. Around this time, the House of Savoy came to at least nominally dominate the city. In the 15th century, an oligarchic republican government emerged with the creation of the Grand Council. In the first half of the 16th century, the Protestant Reformation reached the city, causing religious strife, during which Savoy rule was thrown off and Geneva allied itself with the Swiss Confederacy. In 1541, with Protestantism on the rise, John Calvin, the Protestant Reformer and proponent of Calvinism, became the spiritual leader of the city and established a "Protestant Rome". By the 18th century, Geneva had come under the influence of Catholic France, which cultivated the city as its own. France tended to be at odds with the ordinary townsfolk, which inspired the failed Geneva Revolution of 1782, an attempt to win representation in the government for men of modest means. In 1798, Revolutionary France under the Directory annexed Geneva. France lost Geneva, which recovered its independence, at the end of the Napoleonic Wars. On 19 May 1815, Geneva joined the Swiss Confederation. In 1907, the separation of Church and State was adopted. Geneva flourished in the 19th and 20th centuries, becoming the seat of many international organisations.

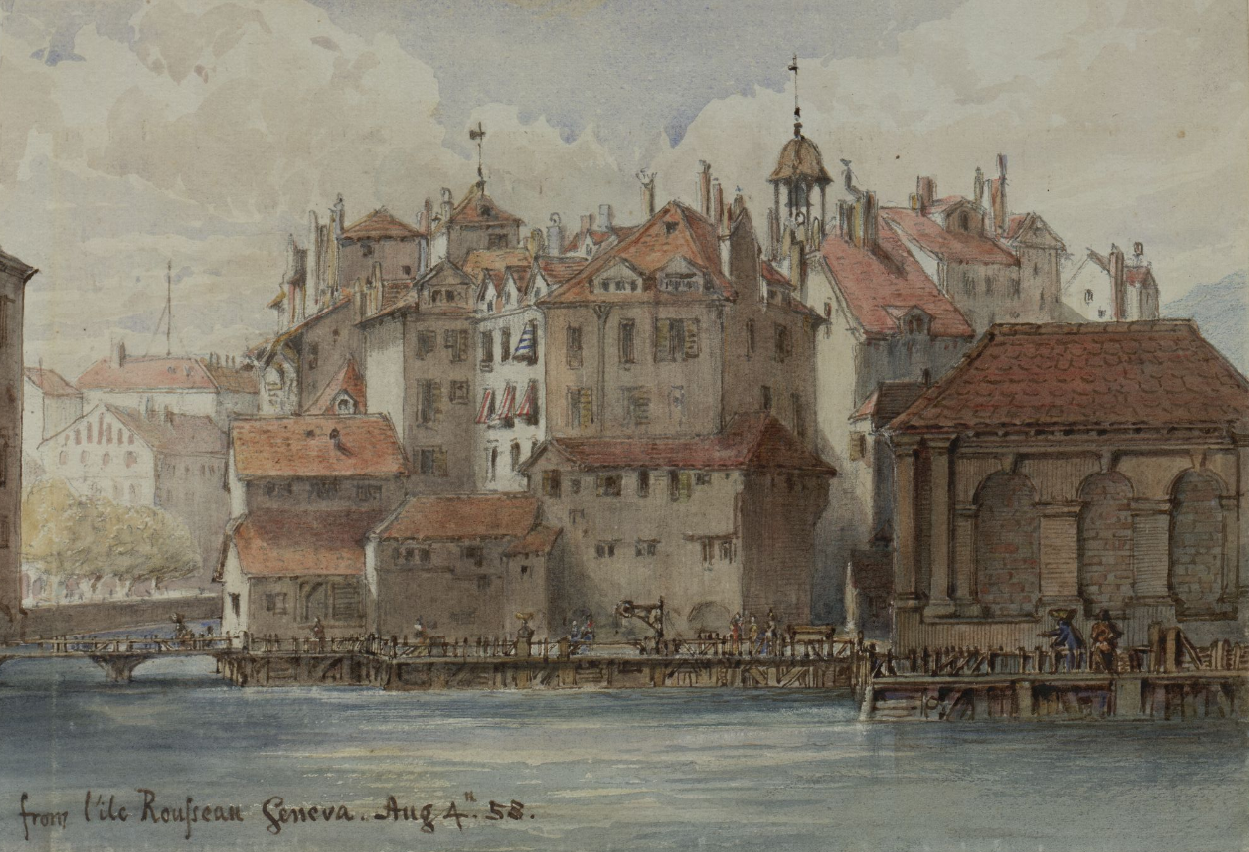
A view of Geneva by Frances Elizabeth Wynne, 4 August 1858

Place Neuve, 1908

Aerial view, 1966

== Geography ==
=== Topography ===
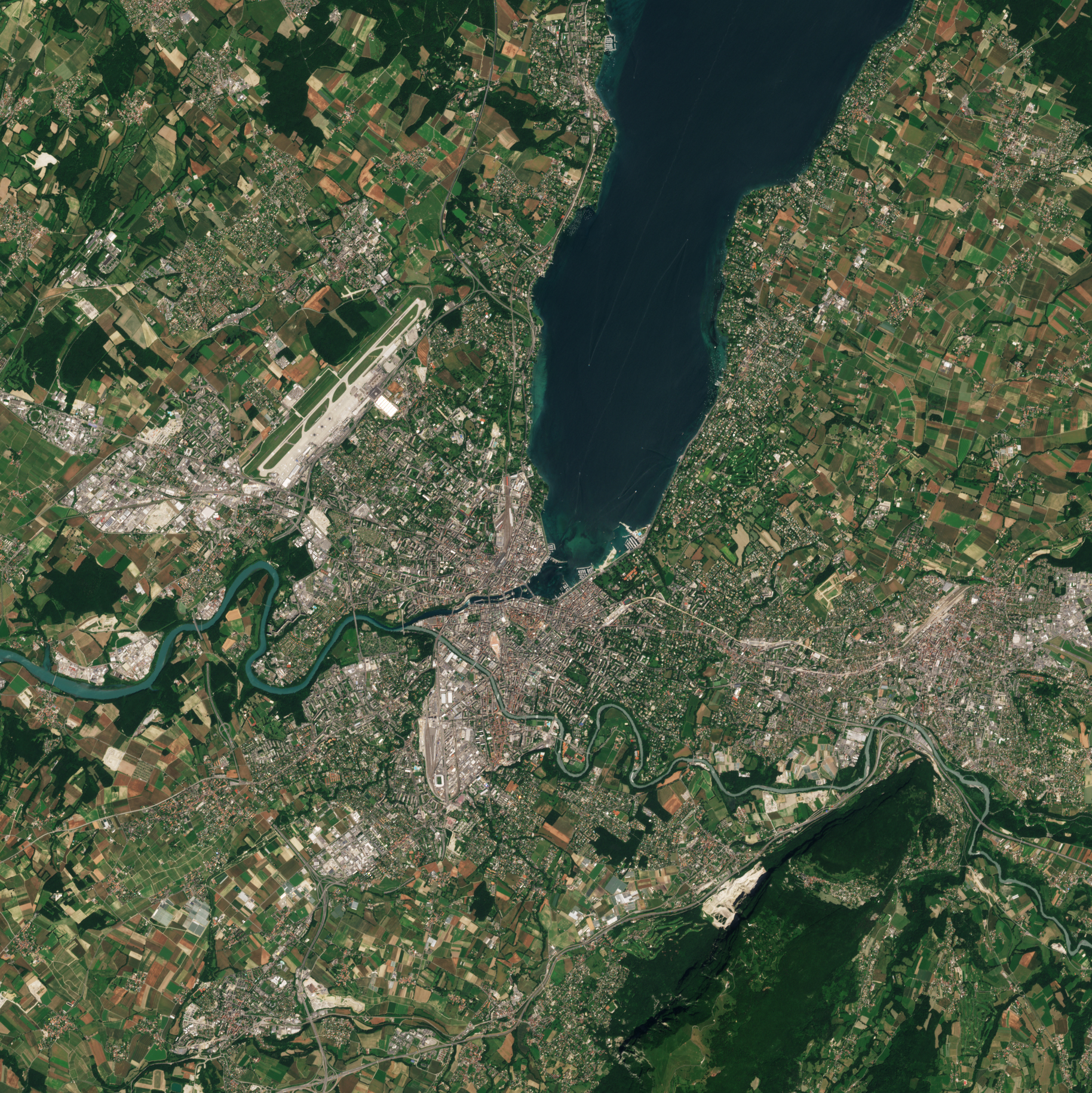
Satellite view of Geneva; Cointrin Airport is centre left. The Salève (in France) is the large area of green at the bottom right.

Map of Geneva, 1:50,000

Geneva is located at 46°12' North, 6°09' East, at the south-western end of Lake Geneva, where the Rhône flows out. It is surrounded by three mountain chains, each belonging to the Jura: the Jura main range lies north-westward, the Vuache southward, and the Salève south-eastward.

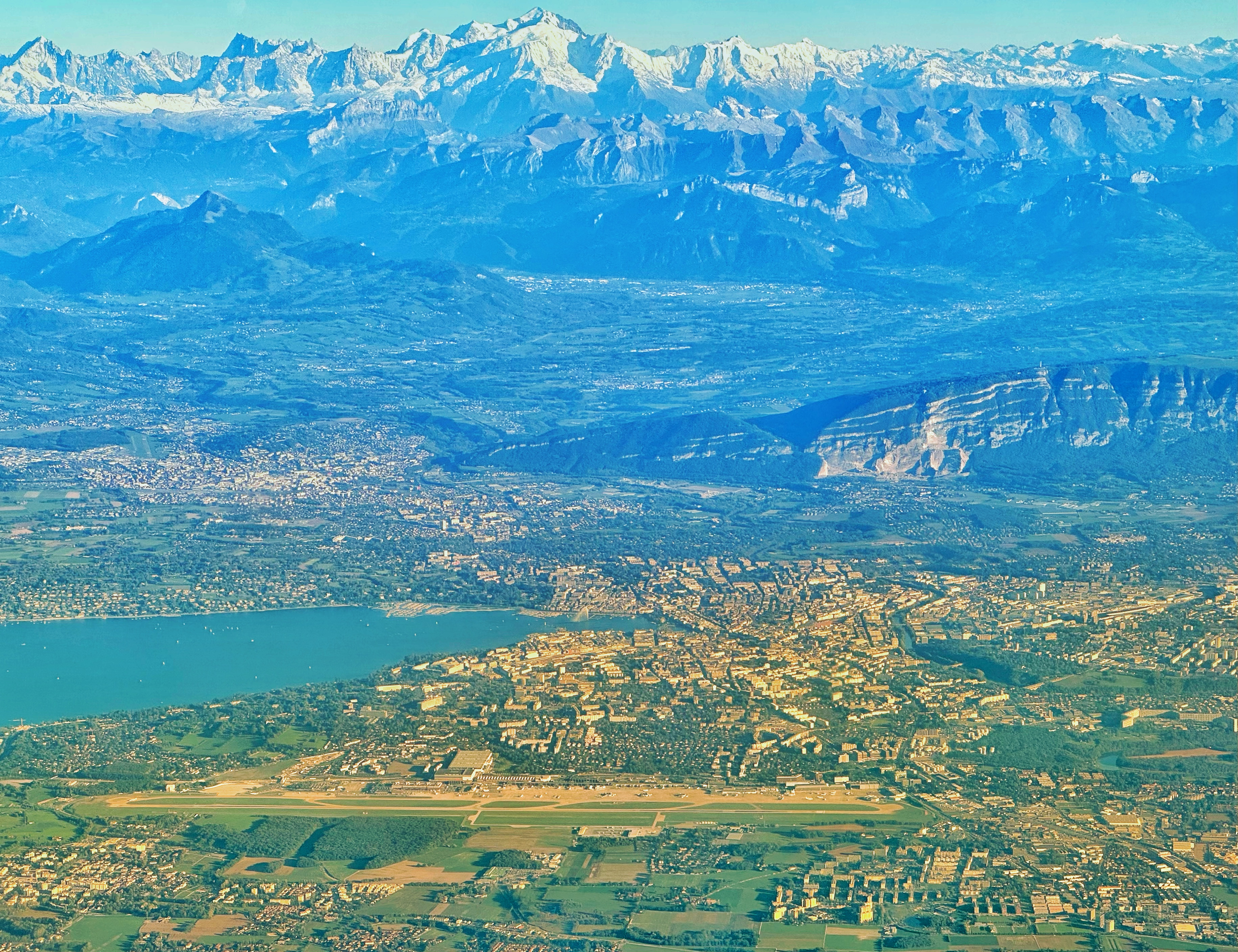
The Geneva area seen from above the Jura mountain chain, with the International airport in the foreground, and the Mont Blanc mountain range in the background

The city covers an area of 15.93 km^{2} (6.2 sq mi), while the area of the canton is 282 km^{2} (108.9 sq mi), including the two small exclaves of Céligny in Vaud. The part of the lake that is attached to Geneva has an area of 38 km^{2} (14.7 sq mi) and is sometimes referred to as petit lac ('small lake'). The canton has only a 4.5 km-long (2.8 mi) border with the rest of Switzerland. Of 107.5 km (66.8 mi) of the border, 103 are shared with France, the department of Ain to the north and west and the department of Haute-Savoie to the south and east.

Of the land in the city, 0.24 km^{2} (0.093 sq mi), or 1.5%, is used for agricultural purposes, while 0.5 km^{2} (0.19 sq mi), or 3.1%, is forested. The rest of the land, 14.63 km^{2} (5.65 sq mi), or 91.8%, is built up (buildings or roads), 0.49 km^{2} (0.19 sq mi), or 3.1%, is either rivers or lakes and 0.02 km^{2} (4.9 acres), or 0.1%, is wasteland.

Of the built-up area, industrial buildings made up 3.4%, housing and buildings made up 46.2% and transportation infrastructure 25.8%, while parks, green belts and sports fields made up 15.7%. Of the agricultural land, 0.3% is used for growing crops. Of the water in the municipality, 0.2% is composed of lakes and 2.9% is rivers and streams.

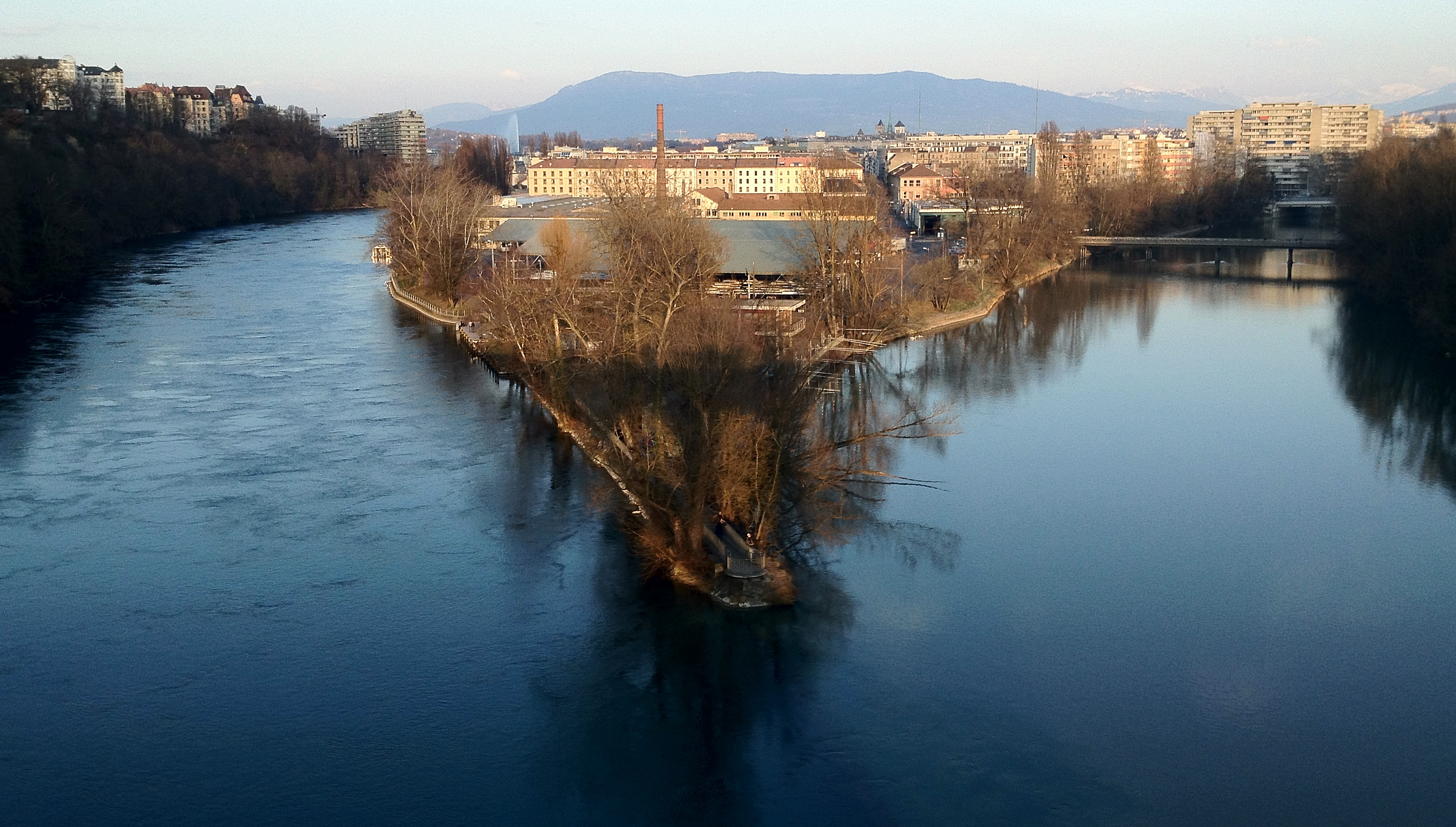
Confluence of the Rhône and the Arve

The altitude of Geneva is 373.6 m (1,225.7 ft) and corresponds to the altitude of the largest of the Pierres du Niton, two large rocks emerging from the lake which date from the last ice age. This rock was chosen by General Guillaume Henri Dufour as the reference point for surveying in Switzerland. The second main river of Geneva is the Arve, which flows into the Rhône just west of the city centre. Mont Blanc can be seen from Geneva and is an hour's drive from the city.

=== Climate ===
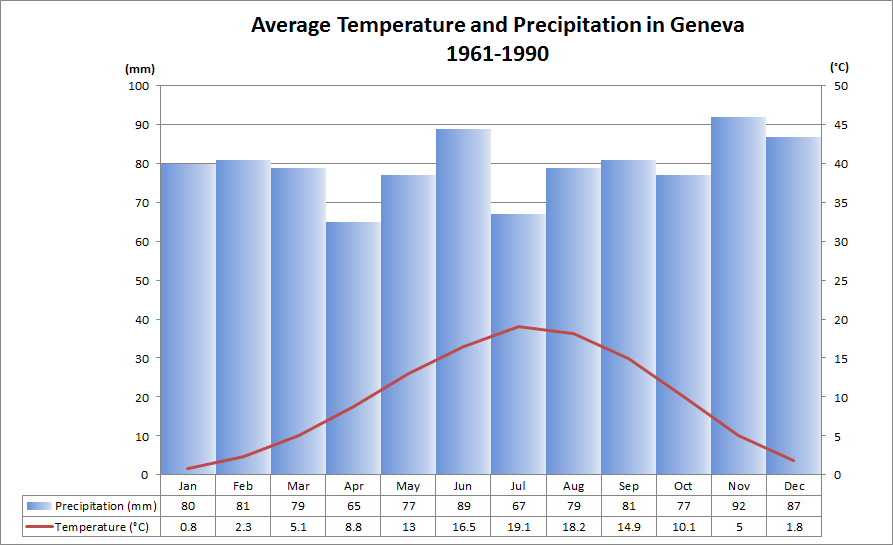
Average temperature and precipitation 1961–1990

The climate of Geneva is a temperate climate, more specifically an oceanic climate (Köppen climate classification: Cfb). Winters are cool, usually with light frosts at night and thawing conditions during the day. Summers are relatively warm. Precipitation is adequate and is relatively well-distributed throughout the year, although autumn is slightly wetter than other seasons. Ice storms near Lac Léman are normal in the winter: Geneva can be affected by the Bise, a north-easterly wind. This can lead to severe icing in winter.

In summer, many people swim in the lake and patronise public beaches such as Genève Plage and the Bains des Pâquis. The city, in certain years, receives snow during colder months. The nearby mountains are subject to substantial snowfall and are suitable for skiing. Many world-renowned ski resorts such as Verbier and Crans-Montana are less than three hours away by car. Mont Salève (1,379 m (4,524 ft)), just across the border in France, dominates the southerly view from the city centre, and Mont Blanc, the highest of the Alpine range, is visible from most of the city, towering high above Chamonix, which, along with Morzine, Le Grand Bornand, La Clusaz, and resorts of the Grand Massif such as Samoens, Morillon, and Flaine, are the closest French skiing destinations to Geneva.

During the years 2000–2009, the mean yearly temperature was 11 °C and the mean number of sunshine-hours per year was 2003.

The highest temperature recorded in Genève–Cointrin was 39.7 °C (103.5 °F) in July 2015, and the lowest temperature recorded was −20.0 °C (−4.0 °F) in February 1956.

Climate data for Geneva (GVA), elevation: 412 m (1,352 ft), 1991–2020 normals, extremes 1901–present
| Month | Jan | Feb | Mar | Apr | May | Jun | Jul | Aug | Sep | Oct | Nov | Dec | Year |
|---|---|---|---|---|---|---|---|---|---|---|---|---|---|
| Record high °C (°F) | 18.1 (64.6) | 20.6 (69.1) | 24.9 (76.8) | 27.5 (81.5) | 33.8 (92.8) | 36.5 (97.7) | 39.7 (103.5) | 39.3 (102.7) | 34.8 (94.6) | 27.3 (81.1) | 23.2 (73.8) | 20.8 (69.4) | 39.7 (103.5) |
| Mean daily maximum °C (°F) | 5.1 (41.2) | 7.0 (44.6) | 11.8 (53.2) | 15.9 (60.6) | 20.1 (68.2) | 24.2 (75.6) | 26.7 (80.1) | 26.2 (79.2) | 21.1 (70.0) | 15.5 (59.9) | 9.3 (48.7) | 5.6 (42.1) | 15.7 (60.3) |
| Daily mean °C (°F) | 2.1 (35.8) | 2.9 (37.2) | 6.7 (44.1) | 10.5 (50.9) | 14.5 (58.1) | 18.4 (65.1) | 20.6 (69.1) | 20.0 (68.0) | 15.7 (60.3) | 11.3 (52.3) | 6.0 (42.8) | 2.8 (37.0) | 11.0 (51.8) |
| Mean daily minimum °C (°F) | −1.1 (30.0) | −1.1 (30.0) | 1.7 (35.1) | 5.0 (41.0) | 9.1 (48.4) | 12.7 (54.9) | 14.6 (58.3) | 14.2 (57.6) | 10.7 (51.3) | 7.2 (45.0) | 2.6 (36.7) | −0.2 (31.6) | 6.3 (43.3) |
| Record low °C (°F) | −19.9 (−3.8) | −20.0 (−4.0) | −13.3 (8.1) | −5.2 (22.6) | −2.2 (28.0) | 1.3 (34.3) | 3.0 (37.4) | 4.9 (40.8) | 0.2 (32.4) | −4.7 (23.5) | −10.9 (12.4) | −17.0 (1.4) | −20.0 (−4.0) |
| Average precipitation mm (inches) | 72.8 (2.87) | 55.9 (2.20) | 62.1 (2.44) | 67.1 (2.64) | 78.5 (3.09) | 83.2 (3.28) | 79.2 (3.12) | 81.2 (3.20) | 90.7 (3.57) | 96.5 (3.80) | 88.6 (3.49) | 89.9 (3.54) | 945.7 (37.23) |
| Average snowfall cm (inches) | 7.5 (3.0) | 5.3 (2.1) | 2.5 (1.0) | 0.3 (0.1) | 0.0 (0.0) | 0.0 (0.0) | 0.0 (0.0) | 0.0 (0.0) | 0.0 (0.0) | 0.0 (0.0) | 3.0 (1.2) | 5.3 (2.1) | 23.9 (9.4) |
| Average precipitation days (≥ 1.0 mm) | 9.5 | 7.9 | 8.2 | 8.6 | 10.2 | 9.1 | 8.1 | 7.8 | 8.3 | 9.7 | 9.9 | 10.3 | 107.6 |
| Average snowy days (≥ 1.0 cm) | 2.0 | 1.5 | 0.8 | 0.1 | 0.0 | 0.0 | 0.0 | 0.0 | 0.0 | 0.0 | 0.8 | 1.8 | 7.0 |
| Average relative humidity (%) | 81 | 75 | 68 | 65 | 68 | 66 | 64 | 67 | 73 | 80 | 82 | 82 | 73 |
| Mean monthly sunshine hours | 60.9 | 95.9 | 161.2 | 186.6 | 212.0 | 245.8 | 269.2 | 241.6 | 184.0 | 116.3 | 65.4 | 48.0 | 1,886.9 |
| Percentage possible sunshine | 25 | 38 | 50 | 51 | 50 | 57 | 62 | 62 | 56 | 40 | 27 | 21 | 48 |
Source 1: NOAA
Source 2: MeteoSwissKNMI

Climate data for Geneva (GVA), elevation: 420 m (1,378 ft), 1961–1990 normals and extremes
| Month | Jan | Feb | Mar | Apr | May | Jun | Jul | Aug | Sep | Oct | Nov | Dec | Year |
|---|---|---|---|---|---|---|---|---|---|---|---|---|---|
| Record high °C (°F) | 15.5 (59.9) | 18.0 (64.4) | 22.3 (72.1) | 25.8 (78.4) | 28.6 (83.5) | 33.9 (93.0) | 36.6 (97.9) | 35.5 (95.9) | 32.9 (91.2) | 27.5 (81.5) | 21.1 (70.0) | 16.4 (61.5) | 36.6 (97.9) |
| Mean maximum °C (°F) | 11.0 (51.8) | 13.3 (55.9) | 18.1 (64.6) | 21.5 (70.7) | 25.3 (77.5) | 29.9 (85.8) | 33.1 (91.6) | 32.6 (90.7) | 28.0 (82.4) | 22.1 (71.8) | 15.9 (60.6) | 12.5 (54.5) | 33.1 (91.6) |
| Mean daily maximum °C (°F) | 3.5 (38.3) | 5.3 (41.5) | 9.2 (48.6) | 13.5 (56.3) | 17.6 (63.7) | 21.8 (71.2) | 24.6 (76.3) | 23.7 (74.7) | 20.3 (68.5) | 13.9 (57.0) | 8.0 (46.4) | 4.2 (39.6) | 13.8 (56.8) |
| Daily mean °C (°F) | 0.7 (33.3) | 2.0 (35.6) | 5.0 (41.0) | 8.8 (47.8) | 12.8 (55.0) | 16.5 (61.7) | 19.1 (66.4) | 18.1 (64.6) | 14.9 (58.8) | 9.9 (49.8) | 5.0 (41.0) | 1.8 (35.2) | 9.6 (49.2) |
| Mean daily minimum °C (°F) | −2.3 (27.9) | −1.2 (29.8) | 0.3 (32.5) | 3.5 (38.3) | 7.1 (44.8) | 10.3 (50.5) | 11.8 (53.2) | 11.3 (52.3) | 9.0 (48.2) | 5.4 (41.7) | 1.8 (35.2) | −1.1 (30.0) | 4.7 (40.4) |
| Mean minimum °C (°F) | −9.6 (14.7) | −7.5 (18.5) | −5.7 (21.7) | −2.0 (28.4) | 1.0 (33.8) | 4.9 (40.8) | 6.3 (43.3) | 6.1 (43.0) | 3.6 (38.5) | −0.1 (31.8) | −3.9 (25.0) | −7.7 (18.1) | −9.6 (14.7) |
| Record low °C (°F) | −19.5 (−3.1) | −17.4 (0.7) | −13.4 (7.9) | −4.9 (23.2) | −2.3 (27.9) | 1.3 (34.3) | 2.5 (36.5) | 4.3 (39.7) | −0.2 (31.6) | −2.1 (28.2) | −9.2 (15.4) | −16.7 (1.9) | −19.5 (−3.1) |
| Average precipitation mm (inches) | 73 (2.9) | 74 (2.9) | 74 (2.9) | 61 (2.4) | 72 (2.8) | 84 (3.3) | 65 (2.6) | 78 (3.1) | 80 (3.1) | 73 (2.9) | 88 (3.5) | 82 (3.2) | 904 (35.6) |
| Average precipitation days (≥ 1.0 mm) | 10.0 | 9.0 | 10.0 | 9.0 | 11.0 | 10.0 | 8.0 | 9.0 | 8.0 | 8.0 | 9.0 | 10.0 | 111 |
| Average relative humidity (%) | 82 | 77 | 72 | 69 | 70 | 67 | 64 | 67 | 73 | 79 | 79 | 81 | 73 |
| Mean monthly sunshine hours | 49.8 | 76.2 | 130.8 | 161.2 | 180.5 | 212.3 | 255.2 | 225.5 | 184.9 | 114.9 | 60.9 | 42.0 | 1,694.2 |
Source: NOAA

== Politics ==
=== Coat of arms ===
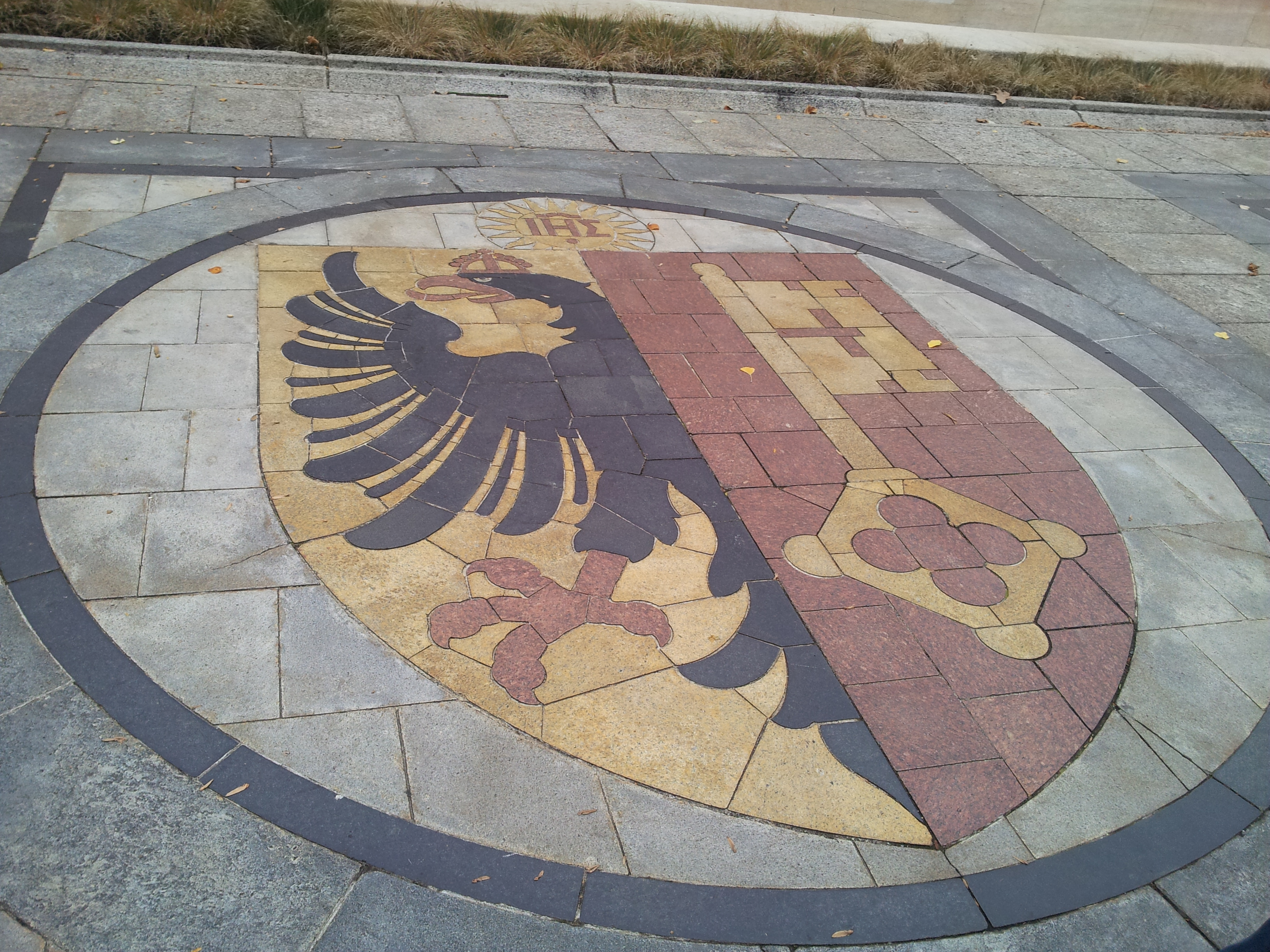
Coat of arms of Geneva as part of the pavement in front of the Reformation Wall, 2013

=== Administrative divisions ===
The city is divided into eight quartiers, or districts, sometimes composed of several neighbourhoods. On the left bank are: (1) Jonction, (2) Centre, Plainpalais, and Acacias; (3) Eaux-Vives; and (4) Champel. The right bank includes: (1) Saint-Jean and Charmilles; (2) Servette and Petit-Saconnex; (3) Grottes and Saint-Gervais; and (4) Paquis and Nations.

=== Government ===
The Administrative Council (French: Conseil administratif) constitutes the executive government of the city of Geneva and operates as a collegiate authority. It is composed of five councilors (Conseiller administratif / Conseillère administrative), each presiding over a department. The president of the executive department acts as mayor (la maire/le maire). In the governmental year 2021–2022, the Administrative Council is presided over by Madame la maire de Genève Frédérique Perler. Departmental tasks, coordination measures and implementation of laws decreed by the Municipal Council are carried out by the Administrative Council. Elections for the Administrative Council are held every five years. The current term of office is from 1 June 2020 to 31 May 2025. The delegates take office due to a winner-takes-all election (French: scrutin majoritaire, Swiss Standard German: Majorzwahl or Majorz). The mayor and vice change each year, while the heads of the other departments are assigned by the collegiate. The executive body holds its meetings in the Palais Eynard, near the Parc des Bastions.

As of 2020, Geneva's Administrative Council is made up of two representatives each of the Social Democratic Party (PS) and the Green Party (PES), and one member of the Christian Democratic Party (PDC). This gives the left-wing parties four out of the five seats and, for the first time in history, a female majority in the election held on 15 March / 5 April 2020. Except for the mayor, all other councillors have been elected for the first time.

Le Conseil administratif of Geneva
| Councillor (Note: French: M. Conseiller administratif for men; M^{me} Conseillère administrative for women) | Party | Departmental responsibility (since year) | Elected in |
|---|---|---|---|
| Marjorie de Chastonay | Greens | Planning, Construction, and Mobility (de l'aménagement, des constructions et de la mobilité, 2020) | 2025 |
| Marie Barbey-Chappuis (Note: Vice President (Vice-présidente) 2021/22) | Christian Democrats | Security and Sport (de la sécurité et des sports, 2020) | 2020 |
| Sami Kanaan | Social Democrats | Culture and Digital Change (de la culture et de la transition numérique, 2020) | 2011 |
| Alfonso Gomez (Note: Mayor (la maire de Genève) 2025/26) | Greens | Finance, Environment and Housing (des finances, de l'environnement et du logement, 2020) | 2020 |
| Christina Kitsos | Social Democrats | Social Cohesion and Solidarity (de la cohésion sociale et de la solidarité, 2020) | 2020 |

=== Parliament ===
Le Conseil municipal of Geneva for the mandate period of 2020–2025
1. Ensemble à gauche (PST-POP & Sol) (8.80%)
2. PS (23.8%)
3. Les Verts (PES) (22.5%)
4. PDC (10.0%)
5. PLR (17.5%)
6. UDC (8.80%)
7. MCG (8.80%)

The Municipal Council (French: Conseil municipal) holds legislative power. It is made up of 80 members, with elections held every five years. The Municipal Council makes regulations and by-laws that are executed by the Administrative Council and the administration. The delegates are selected by means of a system of proportional representation with a seven percent threshold. The sessions of the Municipal Council are public. Unlike members of the Administrative Council, members of the Municipal Council are not politicians by profession, and they are paid a fee based on their attendance. Any resident of Geneva allowed to vote can be elected as a member of the Municipal Council. The Council holds its meetings in the Town Hall (Hôtel de Ville), in the old city.

The last election of the Municipal Council was held on 15 March 2020 for the term 2020–2025. Currently, the Municipal Council consists of: 19 members of the Social Democratic Party (PS), 18 Green Party (PES), 14 Les Libéraux-Radicaux (PLR), 8 Christian Democratic People's Party; (PDC) 7 Geneva Citizens' Movement (MCG), 7 Ensemble à Gauche (an alliance of the left parties PST-POP (Parti Suisse du Travail – Parti Ouvrier et Populaire) and solidaritéS, 6 Swiss People's Party (UDC).

=== Elections ===
==== National Council ====
In the 2019 federal election for the Swiss National Council the most popular party was the Green Party which received 26% (+14.6) of the vote. The next seven most popular parties were the PS (17.9%, -5.9), PLR (15.1%, -2.4), the UDC (12.6%, -3.7), the PdA/solidaritéS (10%, +1.3), the PDC (5.4%, -5.3), the pvl (5%, +2.9), and MCR (4.9%, -2.7). In the federal election a total of 34,319 votes were cast, and the voter turnout was 39.6%.

In the 2015 federal election for the Swiss National Council the most popular party was the PS which received 23.8% of the vote. The next five most popular parties were the PLR (17.6%), the UDC (16.3%), the Green Party (11.4%), the PDC (10.7%), and the solidaritéS (8.8%). In the federal election a total of 36,490 votes were cast, and the voter turnout was 44.1%.

=== Metropolitan cooperation ===
The city centre of Geneva is located only 1.9 km (1.2 mi) from the border of France. As a result, the urban area and the metropolitan area largely extend across the border on French territory. Due to the small size of the municipality of Geneva (16 km^{2} (6 sq mi)) and extension of the urban area over an international border, official bodies of transnational cooperation were developed as early as the 1970s to manage the cross-border Greater Geneva area at a metropolitan level.

In 1973, a Franco-Swiss agreement created the Comité régional franco-genevois ('Franco-Genevan Regional Committee', CRFG). In 1997 an 'Urban planning charter' of the CRFG defined for the first time a planning territory called agglomération franco-valdo-genevoise ('Franco-Vaud-Genevan urban area'). 2001 saw the creation of a Comité stratégique de développement des transports publics régionaux ('Strategic Committee for the Development of Regional Public Transports', DTPR), a committee which adopted in 2003 a 'Charter for Public Transports', first step in the development of a metropolitan, cross-border commuter rail network (see Léman Express).

In 2004, a public transnational body called Projet d’agglomération franco-valdo-genevois ('Franco-Vaud-Genevan urban area project') was created to serve as the main body of metropolitan cooperation for the planning territory defined in 1997, with more local French councils taking part in this new public body than in the CRFG created in 1973. Finally in 2012 the Projet d’agglomération franco-valdo-genevois was renamed Grand Genève ('Greater Geneva'), and the following year it was transformed into a Local Grouping of Transnational Cooperation (GLCT), a public entity under Swiss law, which now serves as the executive body of the Grand Genève.

The Grand Genève GLCT is made up of the Canton of Geneva, the Nyon District (in the canton of Vaud), and the Pôle métropolitain du Genevois français (literally 'Metropolitan hub of the French Genevan territory'), this last one a federation of eight French intercommunal councils in Ain and Haute-Savoie. The Grand Genève GLCT extends over 1,996 km^{2} (771 sq mi) and had a population of 1,046,168 in Jan. 2021 (Swiss estimates and French census), 58.3% of them living on Swiss territory, and 41.7% on French territory.

=== International relations ===
Geneva does not have any sister relationships with other cities. It declares itself related to the entire world.

== Demographics ==
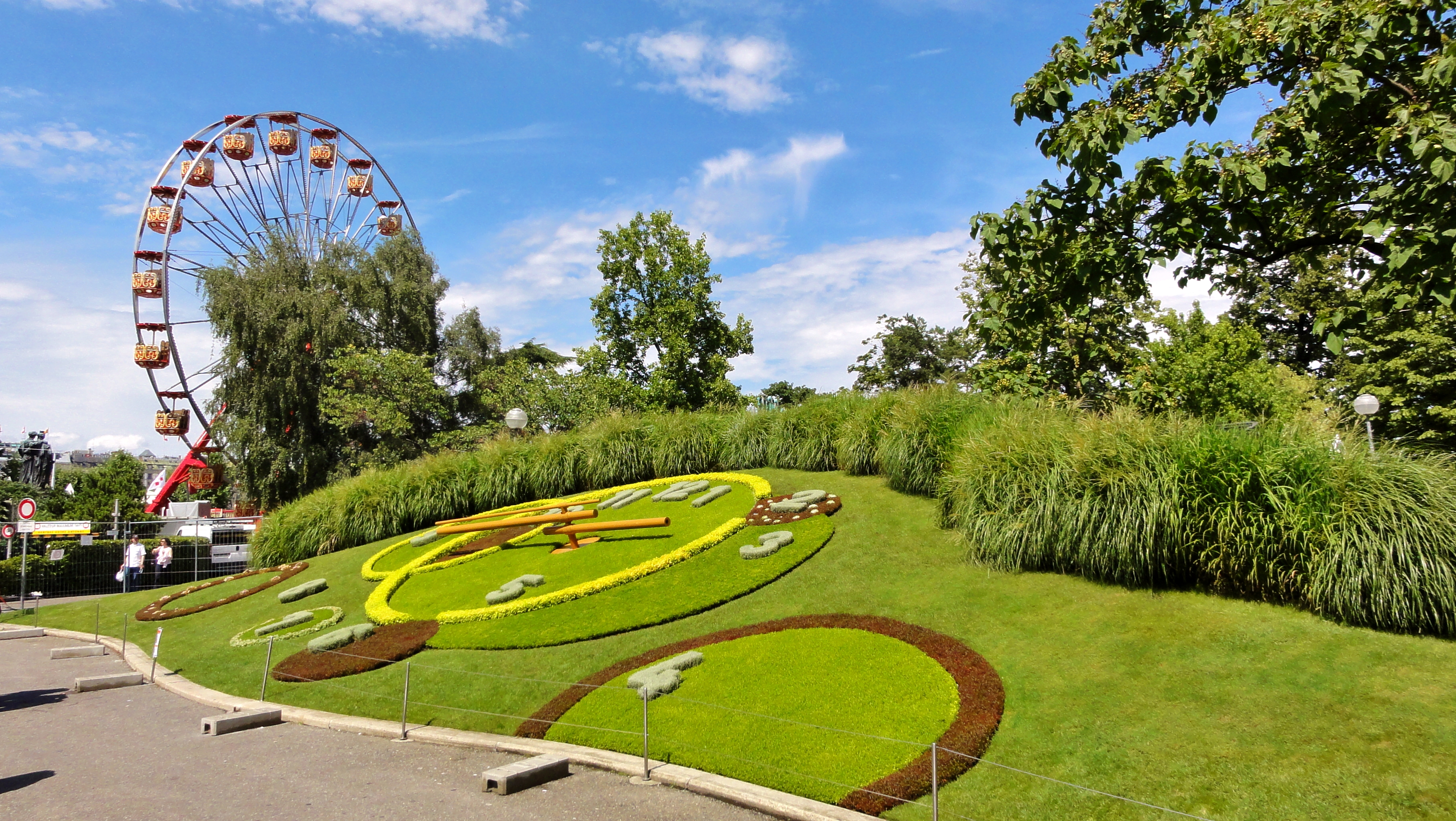
The Flowered Clock at the Quai du Général-Guisan (English Garden), during the 2012 Geneva Festival

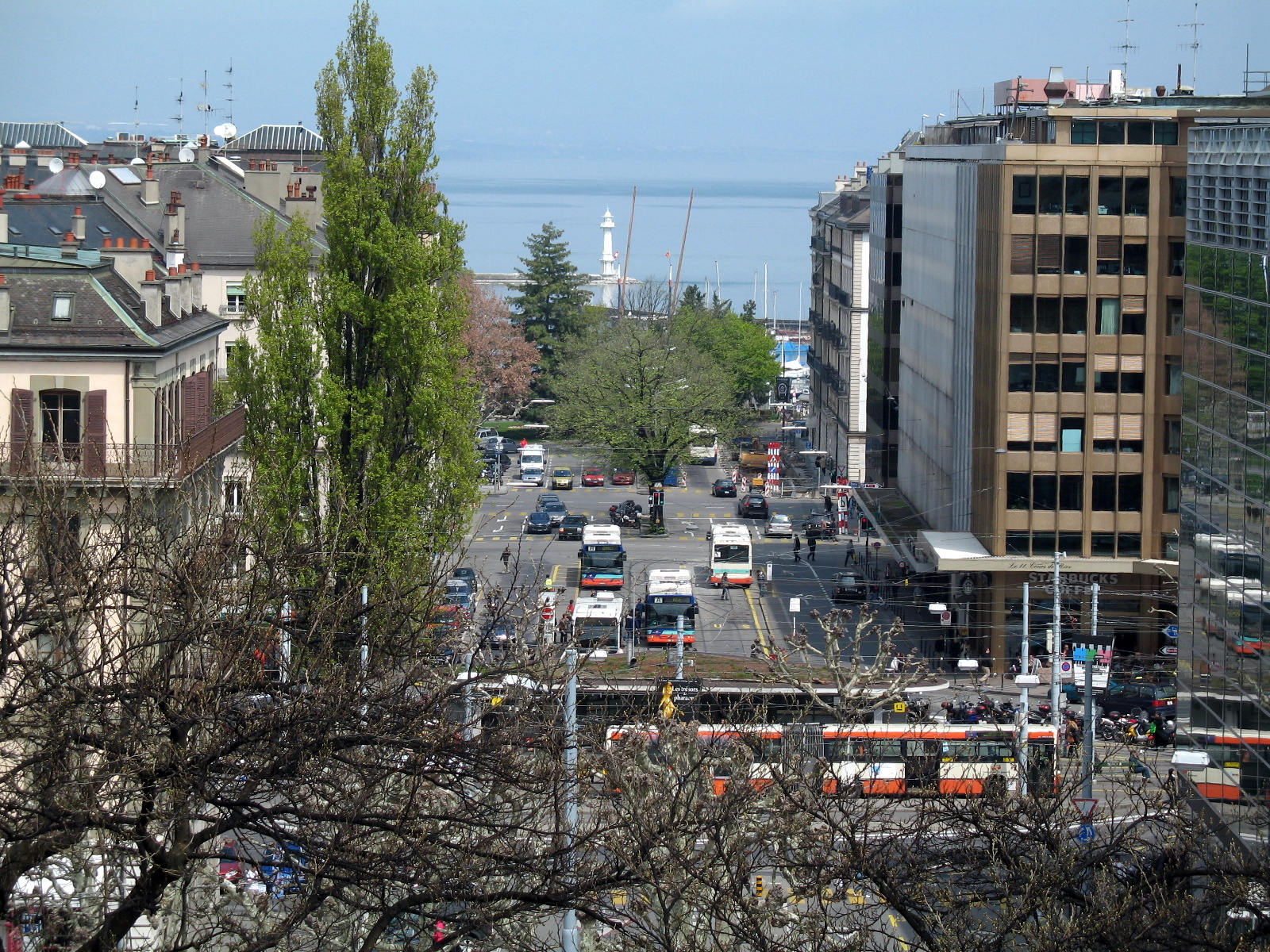
Rue Pierre-Fatio in Geneva

Historical population
| Year | Pop. | ±% |
|---|---|---|
| 1850 | 37,724 | — |
| 1860 | 54,009 | +43.2% |
| 1870 | 60,004 | +11.1% |
| 1880 | 70,355 | +17.3% |
| 1888 | 75,709 | +7.6% |
| 1900 | 97,359 | +28.6% |
| 1910 | 115,243 | +18.4% |
| 1920 | 126,626 | +9.9% |
| 1930 | 124,121 | −2.0% |
| 1941 | 124,431 | +0.2% |
| 1950 | 145,473 | +16.9% |
| 1960 | 176,183 | +21.1% |
| 1970 | 173,618 | −1.5% |
| 1980 | 156,505 | −9.9% |
| 1990 | 171,042 | +9.3% |
| 2000 | 177,964 | +4.0% |
| 2010 | 187,470 | +5.3% |
| 2020 | 203,856 | +8.7% |

The city of Geneva (ville de Genève) had a population of 203,856 in 2021 (January estimate) within its small municipal territory of 16 km^{2} (6 sq mi). The city of Geneva is at the centre of the Geneva metropolitan area, a Functional Urban Area (as per Eurostat methodology) which extends over Swiss territory (entire Canton of Geneva and part of the canton of Vaud) and French territory (parts of the departments of Ain and Haute-Savoie). The Geneva Functional Urban Area covers a land area of 2,292 km^{2} (885 sq mi) (24.2% in Switzerland, 75.8% in France) and had 1,053,436 inhabitants in January 2021 (Swiss estimates and French census), 57.8% of them on Swiss territory and 42.2% on French territory.

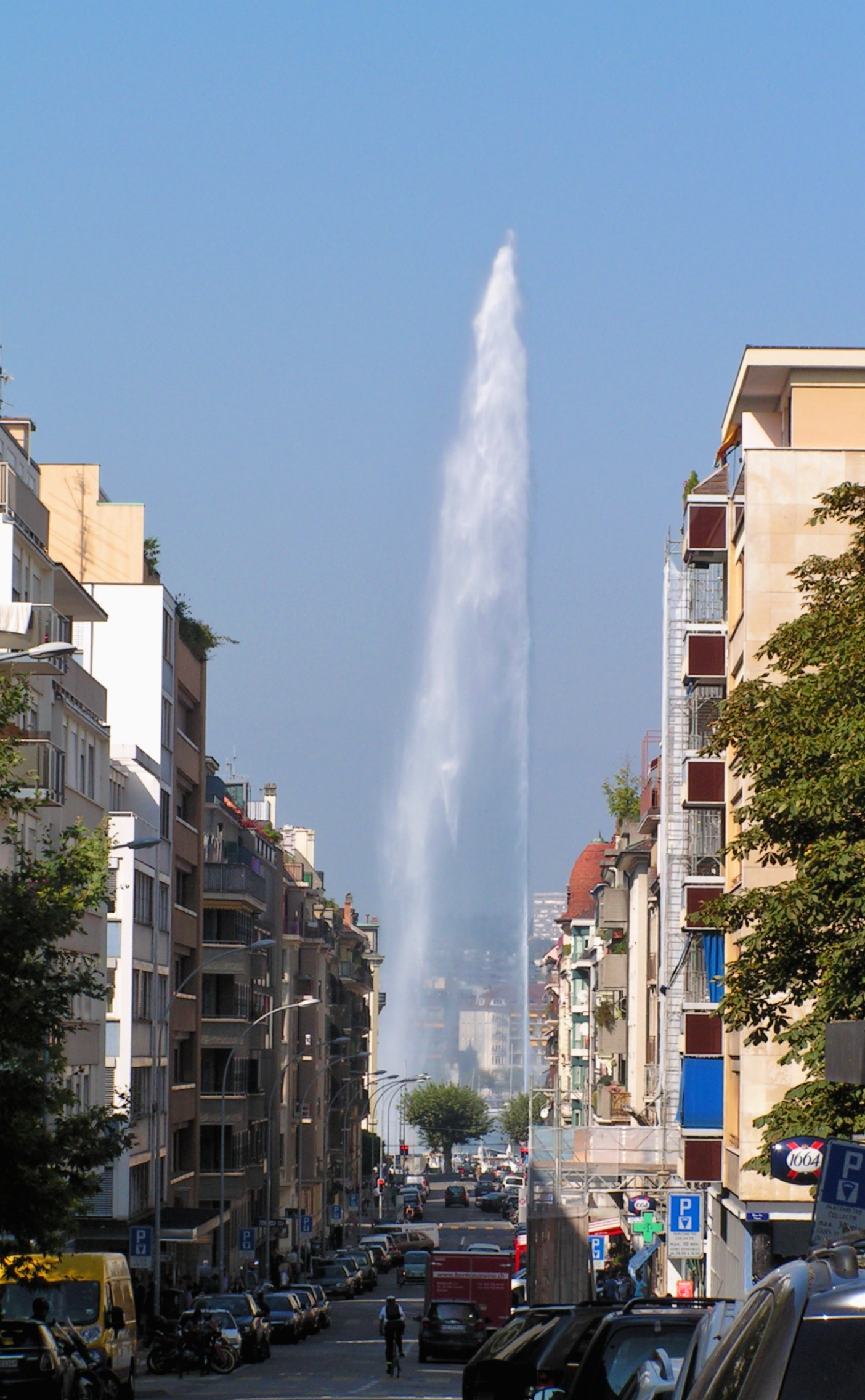
View of the Jet d'eau from Rue du 31 Décembre.

The Geneva metropolitan area is one of the fastest growing in Europe. Its population rose from 906,603 in January 2010 to 1,053,436 in January 2021, which means the metropolitan area registered a population growth rate of +1.39% per year during those 11 years. Growth is higher in the French part of the metropolitan area (+1.80% per year between 2010 and 2021) than in the Swiss part (+1.10% per year between 2010 and 2021), as Geneva attracts many French commuters due to high Swiss salaries and a favourable Franco-Swiss tax regime for French residents working in Switzerland.

=== Language ===
The official language of Geneva (both the city and the canton) is French. English is also common due to a high number of Anglophone residents working in international institutions and the bank sector. In 2000 there were 128,622 residents, or 72.3% of the population, who spoke French as a first language. English was the second most common (7,853 or 4.4%), followed by Spanish (7,462 or 4.2%), Italian (7,320 or 4.1%), and German (7,050 or 4.0%); 113 spoke Romansh, an official language in Switzerland.

=== Population by birthplace ===
In the city of Geneva, as of 2013, 48% of the population are resident foreign nationals. For a list of the largest groups of foreign residents see the cantonal overview. Over the last 10 years (1999–2009), the population has changed at a rate of 7.2%; a rate of 3.4% due to migration and at a rate of 3.4% due to births and deaths.

=== Gender ===
As of 2008, the gender distribution of the population was 47.8% male and 52.2% female. The population was made up of 46,284 Swiss men (24.2% of the population) and 45,127 (23.6%) non-Swiss men. There were 56,091 Swiss women (29.3%) and 43,735 (22.9%) non-Swiss women. As of 2000 approximately 24.3% of the population of the municipality were born in Geneva and lived there in 2000 – 43,296. A further 11,757 or 6.6% who were born in the same canton, while 27,359 or 15.4% were born elsewhere in Switzerland, and 77,893 or 43.8% were born outside of Switzerland.

=== Birth rate ===
In 2008, there were 1,147 live births to Swiss citizens and 893 births to non-Swiss citizens, and in the same time span there were 1,114 deaths of Swiss citizens and 274 non-Swiss citizen deaths. Ignoring immigration and emigration, the population of Swiss citizens increased by 33, while the foreign population increased by 619. There were 465 Swiss men and 498 Swiss women who emigrated from Switzerland. At the same time, there were 2933 non-Swiss men and 2662 non-Swiss women who immigrated from another country to Switzerland. The total Swiss population change in 2008 (from all sources, including moves across municipal borders) was an increase of 135 and the non-Swiss population increased by 3181 people. This represents a population growth rate of 1.8%.

=== Age, status and households ===
As of 2000, children and teenagers (0–19 years old) made up 18.2% of the population, while adults (20–64 years old) made up 65.8% and seniors (over 64 years old) make up 16%.

As of 2000, there were 78,666 people who were single and never married in the municipality. There were 74,205 married individuals, 10,006 widows or widowers and 15,087 individuals who are divorced.

As of 2000, there were 86,231 private households in the municipality, and an average of 1.9 persons per household. There were 44,373 households that consist of only one person and 2,549 households with five or more people. Out of a total of 89,269 households that answered this question, 49.7% were households made up of just one person and there were 471 adults who lived with their parents. Of the rest of the households, there are 17,429 married couples without children, 16,607 married couples with children. There were 5,499 single parents with a child or children. There were 1,852 households that were made up of unrelated people and 3,038 households that were made up of some sort of institution or another collective housing.

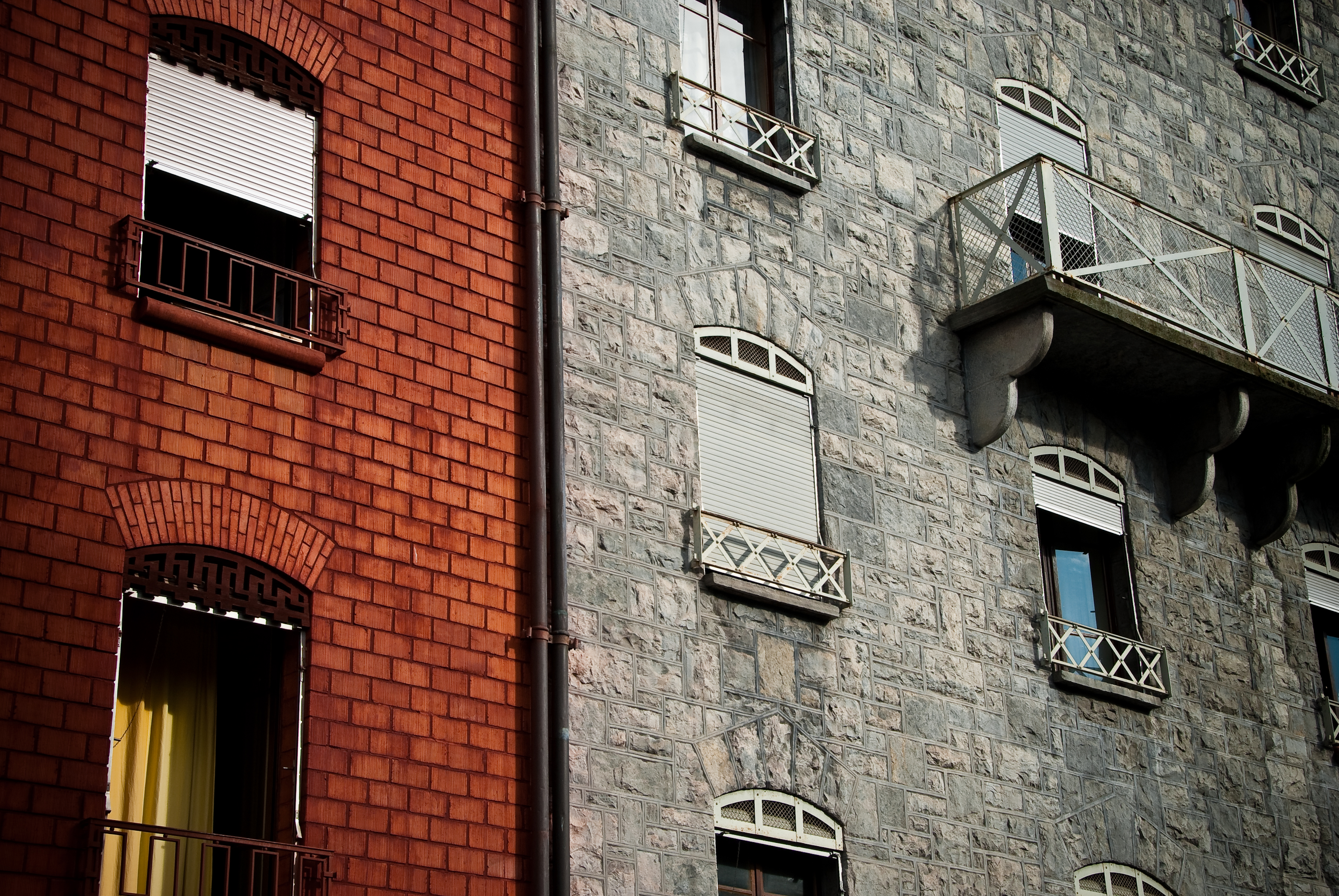
Apartment buildings in the Quartier des Grottes

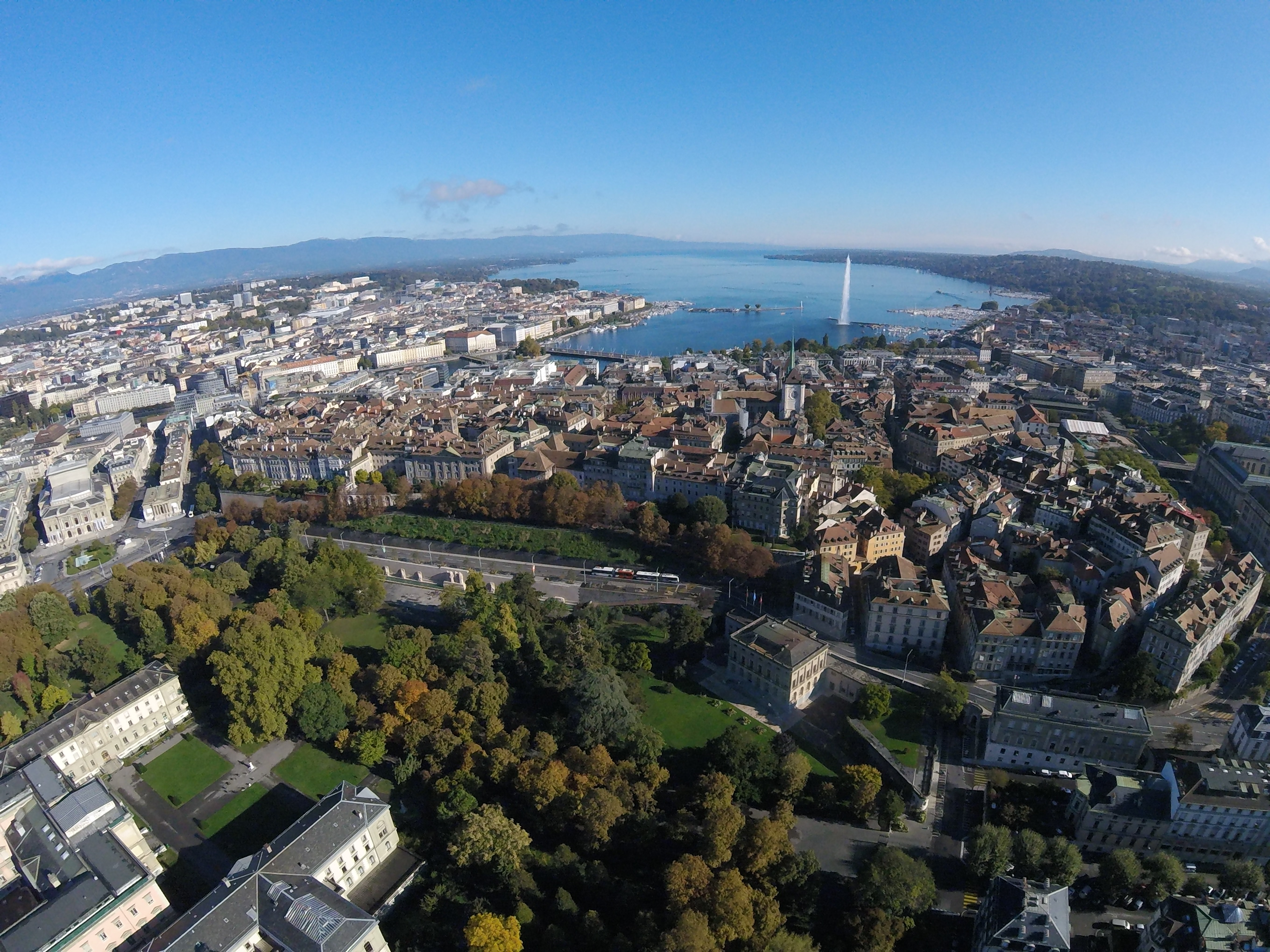
Geneva, with Lake Geneva in the background

In 2000, there were 743 single family homes (or 10.6% of the total) out of a total of 6,990 inhabited buildings. There were 2,758 multi-family buildings (39.5%), along with 2,886 multi-purpose buildings that were mostly used for housing (41.3%) and 603 other use buildings (commercial or industrial) that also had some housing (8.6%). Of the single family homes, 197 were built before 1919, while 20 were built between 1990 and 2000. The greatest number of single family homes (277) were built between 1919 and 1945.

In 2000, there were 101,794 apartments in the municipality. The most common apartment size was 3 rooms of which there were 27,084. There were 21,889 single room apartments and 11,166 apartments with five or more rooms. Of these apartments, a total of 85,330 apartments (83.8% of the total) were permanently occupied, while 13,644 apartments (13.4%) were seasonally occupied and 2,820 apartments (2.8%) were empty. As of 2009, the construction rate of new housing units was 1.3 new units per 1000 residents.

As of 2003, the average price to rent an average apartment in Geneva was 1163.30 Swiss francs (CHF) per month (US$930, £520, €740 approx. exchange rate from 2003). The average rate for a one-room apartment was 641.60 CHF (US$510, £290, €410), a two-room apartment was about 874.46 CHF (US$700, £390, €560), a three-room apartment was about 1126.37 CHF (US$900, £510, €720) and a six or more room apartment cost an average of 2691.07 CHF (US$2150, £1210, €1720). The average apartment price in Geneva was 104.2% of the national average of 1116 CHF. The vacancy rate for the municipality, in 2010, was 0.25%.

In June 2011, the average price of an apartment in and around Geneva was 13,681 CHF per square metre (11 sq ft). The average can be as high as 17,589 Swiss francs (CHF) per square metre (11 sq ft) for a luxury apartment and as low as 9,847 Swiss francs (CHF) for an older or basic apartment. For houses in and around Geneva, the average price was 11,595 Swiss francs (CHF) per square metre (11 sq ft) (June 2011), with a lowest price per square metre (11 sq ft) of 4,874 Swiss francs (CHF), and a maximum price of 21,966 Swiss francs (CHF).

=== Historical population ===
William Monter calculates that the city's total population was 12,000–13,000 in 1550, doubling to over 25,000 by 1560.

The historical population is given in the following chart:

Historic population data
| Year | Total population | German-speaking | French-speaking | Catholic | Protestant | Other | Jewish | Islamic | No religion given | Swiss | Non-Swiss |
|---|---|---|---|---|---|---|---|---|---|---|---|
| 1850 | 37,724 | | | 11,123 | 26,446 | | | | | 29,203 | 8,521 |
| 1870 | 60,004 | | | 27,092 | 35,064 | | | | | 39,012 | 24,507 |
| 1888 | 75,709 | 10,806 | 61,429 | 32,168 | 41,605 | 1,330 | 654 | | | 47,482 | 28,227 |
| 1900 | 97,359 | 11,703 | 77,611 | 44,958 | 49,875 | 1,918 | 1,055 | | | 58,376 | 38,983 |
| 1910 | 115,243 | 14,566 | 86,697 | 53,248 | 55,474 | 4,267 | 2,170 | | | 67,430 | 47,813 |
| 1930 | 124,121 | 18,717 | 93,058 | 49,531 | 66,016 | 4,584 | 2,224 | | | 92,693 | 31,428 |
| 1950 | 145,473 | 20,603 | 111,314 | 58,556 | 74,837 | 6,164 | 2,642 | | | 118,863 | 26,610 |
| 1970 | 173,618 | 19,657 | 111,553 | 90,555 | 65,393 | 22,591 | 3,128 | 959 | 6,164 | 115,107 | 58,511 |
| 1990 | 171,042 | 9,610 | 112,419 | 79,575 | 34,492 | 39,227 | 2,444 | 4,753 | 29,747 | 98,812 | 72,230 |
| 2000 | 177,964 | 7,050 | 128,622 | 66,491 | 26,020 | 34,972 | 2,601 | 8,698 | 41,289 | 99,935 | 78,029 |

=== Religion ===
Religions in Geneva (2023)
1. Catholic (26.3%)
2. Protestant (5.90%)
3. Other christians (6.29%)
4. Jewish (1.29%)
5. Muslim (7.32%)
6. Other religious groups (1.72%)
7. Irreligious (48.8%)
8. Unknown (2.36%)

In 2023, the religious composition of Geneva’s permanent resident population aged 15 years and older reflected significant secularism and religious diversity. According to the Federal Statistical Office (OFS), the largest share of the population, 51.1%, identified as either having no religious affiliation (48.8%) or as having an unknown affiliation (2.36%). Christianity, as a whole, accounted for 38.5% of the population, with 26.3% identifying as Catholic, 5.90% as Protestant, and 6.29% belonging to other Christian communities. Among other religious groups, 7.32% of the population identified as Muslim, 1.29% as Jewish, and 1.72% adhered to other religions.

The 2000 census recorded 66,491 residents (37.4% of the population) as Catholic, while 41,289 people (23.20%) belonged to no church or were agnostic or atheist, 24,105 (13.5%) belonged to the Swiss Reformed Church, and 8,698 (4.89%) were Muslim. There were also 3,959 members of an Orthodox church (2.22%), 220 individuals (or about 0.12% of the population) who belonged to the Christian Catholic Church of Switzerland, 2,422 (1.36%) who belonged to another Christian church, and 2,601 people (1.46%) who were Jewish. There were 707 individuals who were Buddhist, 474 who were Hindu and 423 who belonged to another church. 26,575 respondents (14.93%) did not answer the question.

According to 2012 statistics by Swiss Bundesamt für Statistik 49.2% of the population were Christian, (34.2% Catholic, 8.8% Swiss Reformed (organised in the Protestant Church of Geneva) and 6.2% other Christians, mostly other Protestants), 38% of Genevans were non-religious, 6.1% were Muslim and 1.6% were Jews.

Geneva has historically been considered a Protestant city and was known as the Protestant Rome due to it being the base of John Calvin, William Farel, Theodore Beza and other Protestant reformers. Over the past century, substantial immigration from France and other predominantly Catholic countries, as well as general secularization, has changed its religious landscape. As a result, three times as many Roman Catholics as Protestants lived in the city in 2000, while a large number of residents were members of neither group. Geneva forms part of the Roman Catholic Diocese of Lausanne, Geneva and Fribourg.

The World Council of Churches and the Lutheran World Federation both have their headquarters at the Ecumenical Centre in Grand-Saconnex, Geneva. The World Communion of Reformed Churches, a worldwide organisation of Presbyterian, Continental Reformed, Congregational and other Calvinist churches gathering more than 80 million people around the world was based here from 1948 until 2013. The executive committee of the World Communion of Reformed Churches voted in 2012 to move its offices to Hanover, Germany, citing the high costs of running the ecumenical organisation in Geneva, Switzerland. The move was completed in 2013. Likewise, the Conference of European Churches have moved their headquarters from Geneva to Brussels.

==== "Protestant Rome" ====
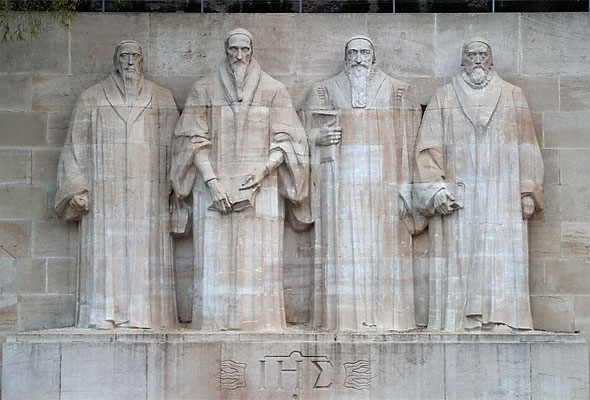
Reformation Wall in Geneva; from left to right: William Farel, John Calvin, Theodore Beza, and John Knox

Prior to the Protestant Reformation the city was de jure and de facto Catholic. Reaction to the new movement varied across Switzerland. John Calvin went to Geneva in 1536 after William Farel encouraged him to do so. In Geneva, the Catholic bishop had been obliged to seek exile in 1532. Geneva became a stronghold of Calvinism. Some of the tenets created there influenced Protestantism as a whole. St. Pierre Cathedral was where Calvin and his Protestant reformers preached. It constituted the epicentre of the newly developing Protestant thought that would later become known as the Reformed tradition. Many prominent Reformed theologians operated there, including William Farel and Theodore Beza, Calvin's successor who progressed Reformed thought after his death.

Geneva was a haven for Calvinists, while Roman Catholics and others considered heretics were persecuted. The case of Michael Servetus, an early Nontrinitarian, is notable. Condemned by both Catholics and Protestants alike, he was arrested in Geneva and burnt at the stake as a heretic by order of the city's Protestant governing council. John Calvin and his followers denounced him, and possibly contributed to his sentence.

In 1802, during its annexation to France under Napoleon I, the Diocese of Geneva was united with the Diocese of Chambéry, but the 1814 Congress of Vienna and the 1816 Treaty of Turin stipulated that in the territories transferred to a now considerably extended Geneva, the Catholic religion was to be protected and that no changes were to be made in existing conditions without an agreement with the Holy See. Napoleon's common policy granted civil rights to Catholics in Protestant-majority areas, as well as the reverse, and also emancipated Jews. In 1819, the city of Geneva and 20 parishes were united to the Diocese of Lausanne by Pope Pius VII and in 1822, the non-Swiss territory was made into the Diocese of Annecy. A variety of concord with the civil authorities came as a result of the separation of church and state, enacted with strong Catholic support in 1907.

=== Crime ===
In 2014 the incidence of crimes listed in the Swiss Criminal Code in Geneva was 143.9 per thousand residents. During the same period the rate of drug crimes was 33.6 per thousand residents. The rate of violations of immigration, visa and work permit laws was 35.7 per thousand residents.

== Cityscape ==
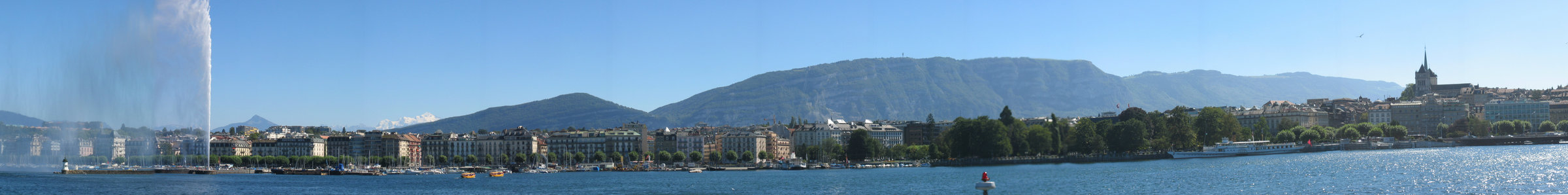
View of Geneva to the south. Mont Salève (in France) looms large behind the city, with the white summit of Mont Blanc just visible behind it 70 km (43 mi) away to the southeast. To the left of Mont Blanc is the point of Le Môle, with the Jet d'Eau in the foreground.
View of Geneva from the Salève

== Heritage sites of national significance ==
There are 82 buildings or sites in Geneva that are listed as Swiss heritage sites of national significance, and the entire old city of Geneva is part of the Inventory of Swiss Heritage Sites.

Religious buildings: Cathédrale St-Pierre et Chapelle des Macchabées, Notre-Dame Church, Russian church, St-Germain Church, Temple de la Fusterie, Temple de l'Auditoire

Civic buildings: Former Arsenal and Archives of the City of Genève, Former Crédit Lyonnais, Former Hôtel Buisson, Former Hôtel du Résident de France et Bibliothèque de la Société de lecture de Genève, Former école des arts industriels, Archives d'État de Genève (Annexe), Bâtiment des forces motrices, Bibliothèque de Genève, Library juive de Genève «Gérard Nordmann», Cabinet des estampes, Centre d'Iconographie genevoise, Collège Calvin, École Geisendorf, University Hospital of Geneva (HUG), Hôtel de Ville et tour Baudet, Immeuble Clarté at Rue Saint-Laurent 2 and 4, Immeubles House Rotonde at Rue Charles-Giron 11–19, Immeubles at Rue Beauregard 2, 4, 6, 8, Immeubles at Rue de la Corraterie 10–26, Immeubles at Rue des Granges 2–6, Immeuble at Rue des Granges 8, Immeubles at Rue des Granges 10 and 12, Immeuble at Rue des Granges 14, Immeuble and Former Armory at Rue des Granges 16, Immeubles at Rue Pierre Fatio 7 and 9, House de Saussure at Rue de la Cité 24, House Des arts du Grütli at Rue du Général-Dufour 16, House Royale et les deux immeubles à côté at Quai Gustave Ador 44–50, Tavel House at Rue du Puits-St-Pierre 6, Turrettini House at Rue de l'Hôtel-de-Ville 8 and 10, Brunswick Monument, Palais de Justice, Palais de l'Athénée, Palais des Nations with library and archives of the SDN and ONU, Palais Eynard et Archives de la ville de Genève, Palais Wilson, Parc des Bastions avec Mur des Réformateurs, Place de Neuve et Monument du Général Dufour, Pont de la Machine, Pont sur l'Arve, Poste du Mont-Blanc, Quai du Mont-Blanc, Quai et Hôtel des Bergues, Quai Général Guisan and English Gardens, Quai Gustave-Ador and Jet d'eau, Télévision Suisse Romande, University of Geneva, Victoria Hall.

Archeological sites: Foundation Baur and Museum of the arts d'Extrême-Orient, Parc et campagne de la Grange and Library (neolithic shore settlement/Roman villa), Bronze Age shore settlement of Plonjon, Temple de la Madeleine archeological site, Temple Saint-Gervais archeological site, Old City with Celtic, Roman and medieval villages.

Museums, theaters, and other cultural sites: Conservatoire de musique at Place Neuve 5, Conservatoire et Jardin botaniques, Fonds cantonal d'art contemporain, Ile Rousseau and statue, Institut et Musée Voltaire with Library and Archives, Mallet House and Museum international de la Réforme, Musée Ariana, Museum of Art and History, Museum d'art moderne et contemporain, Museum d'ethnographie, Museum of the International Red Cross, Musée Rath, Natural History Museum, Plainpalais Commune Auditorium, Pitoëff Theatre, Villa Bartholoni at the Museum of History and Science (see also: List of museums in Geneva).

International organisations: CERN, International Labour Organization (ILO), International Committee of the Red Cross, United Nations High Commissioner for Refugees (UNHCR), World Meteorological Organization, World Trade Organization, International Telecommunication Union, World YMCA.

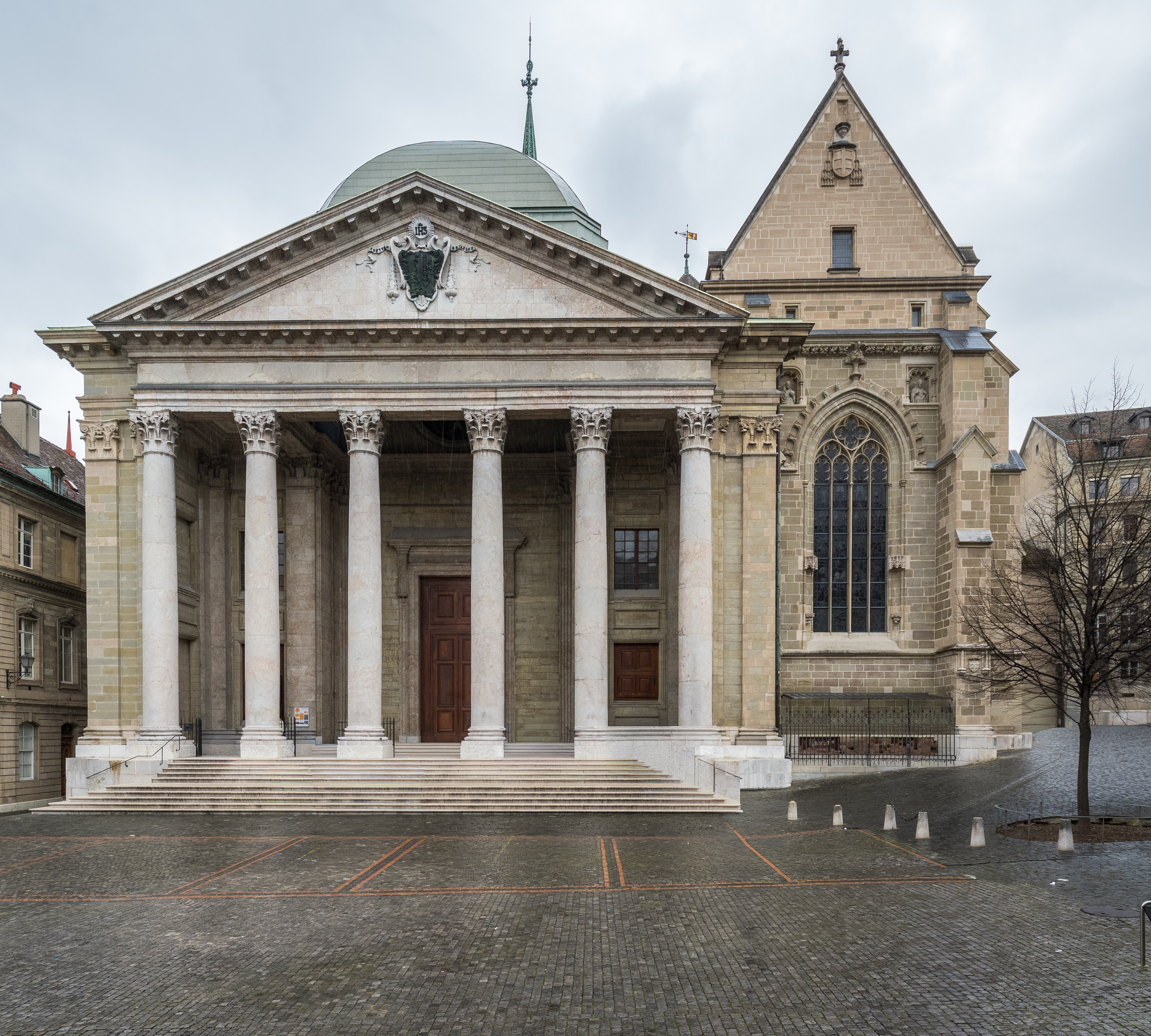
St. Pierre Cathedral

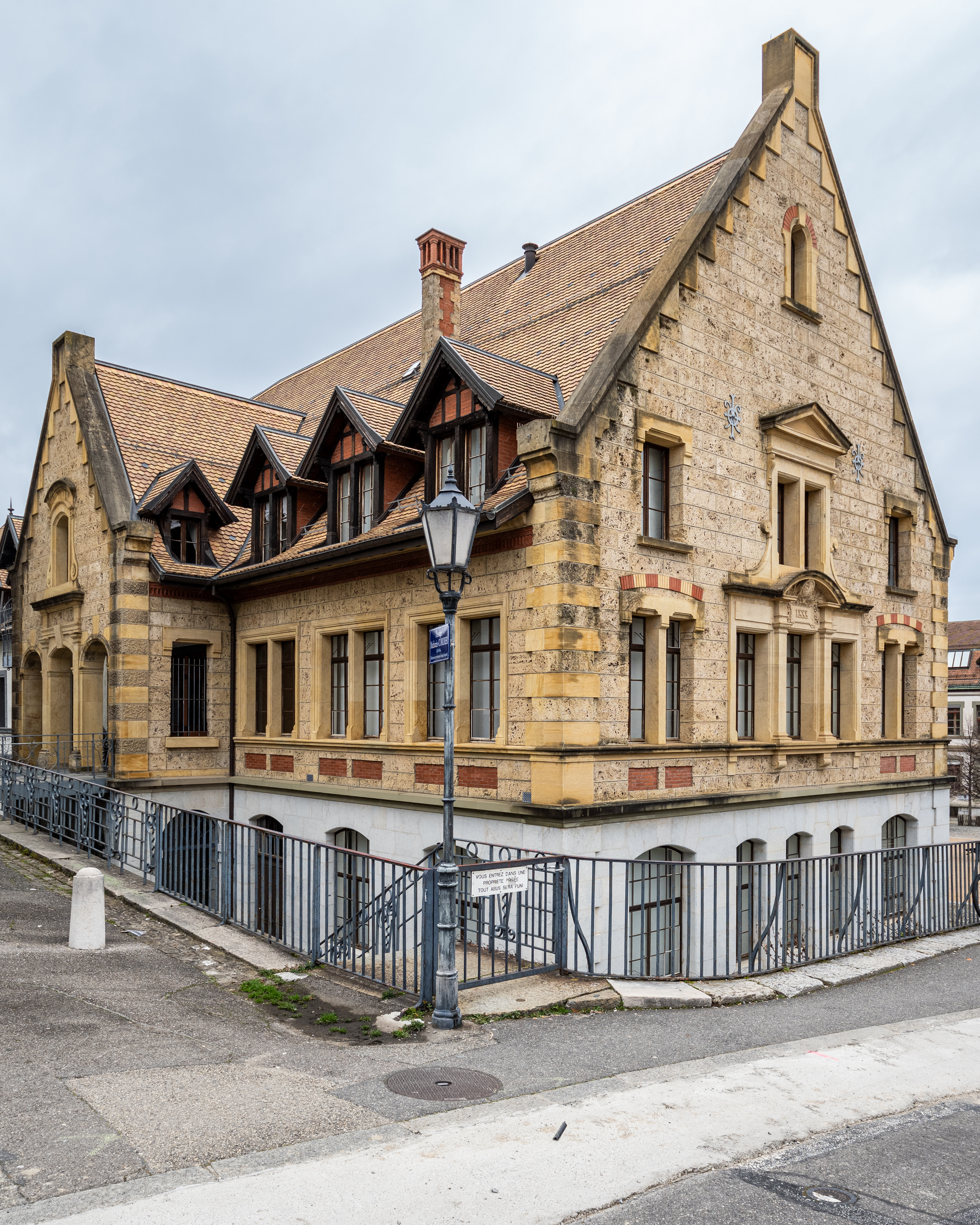
Collège Calvin

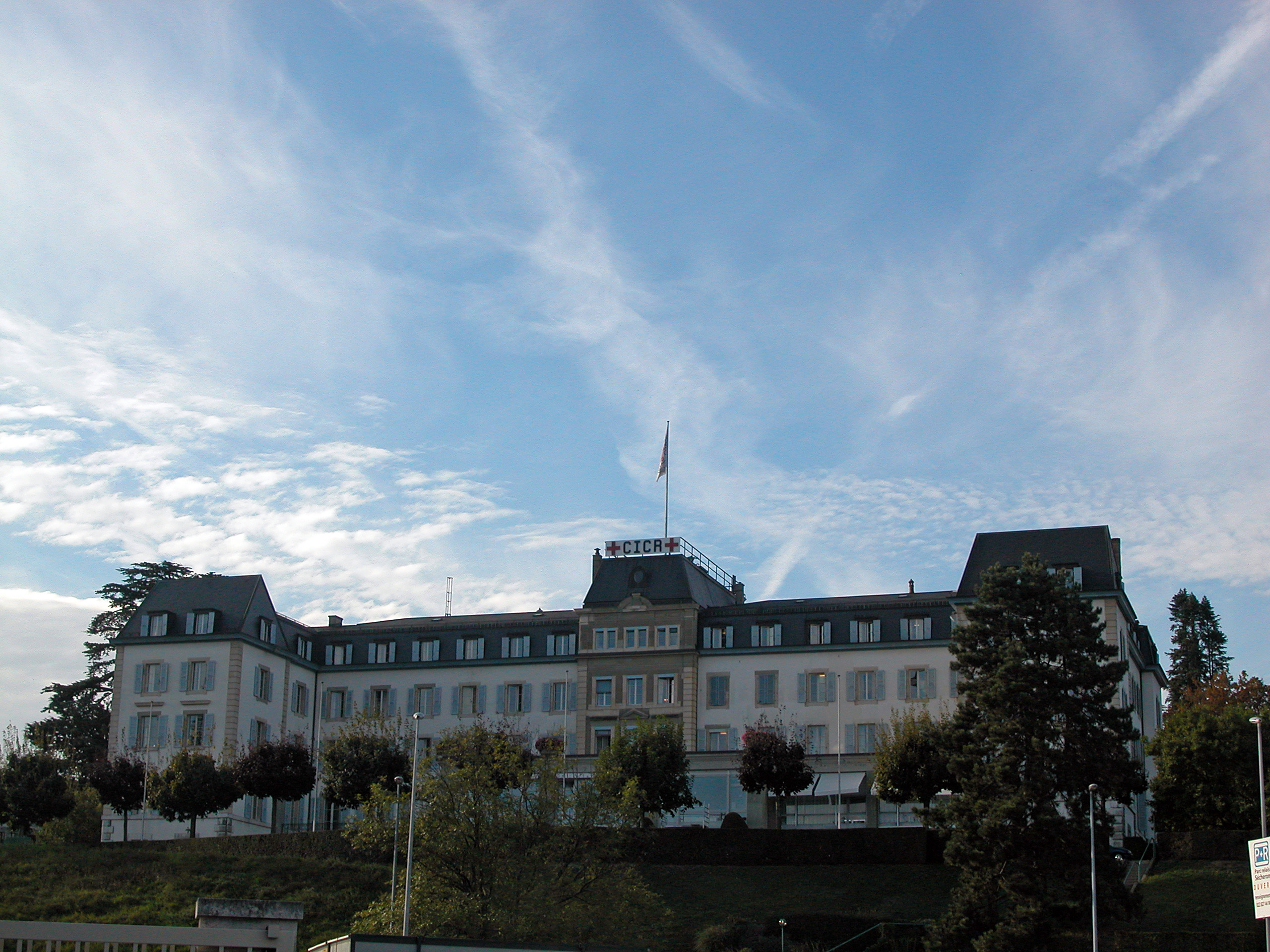
International Committee of the Red Cross (CICR)

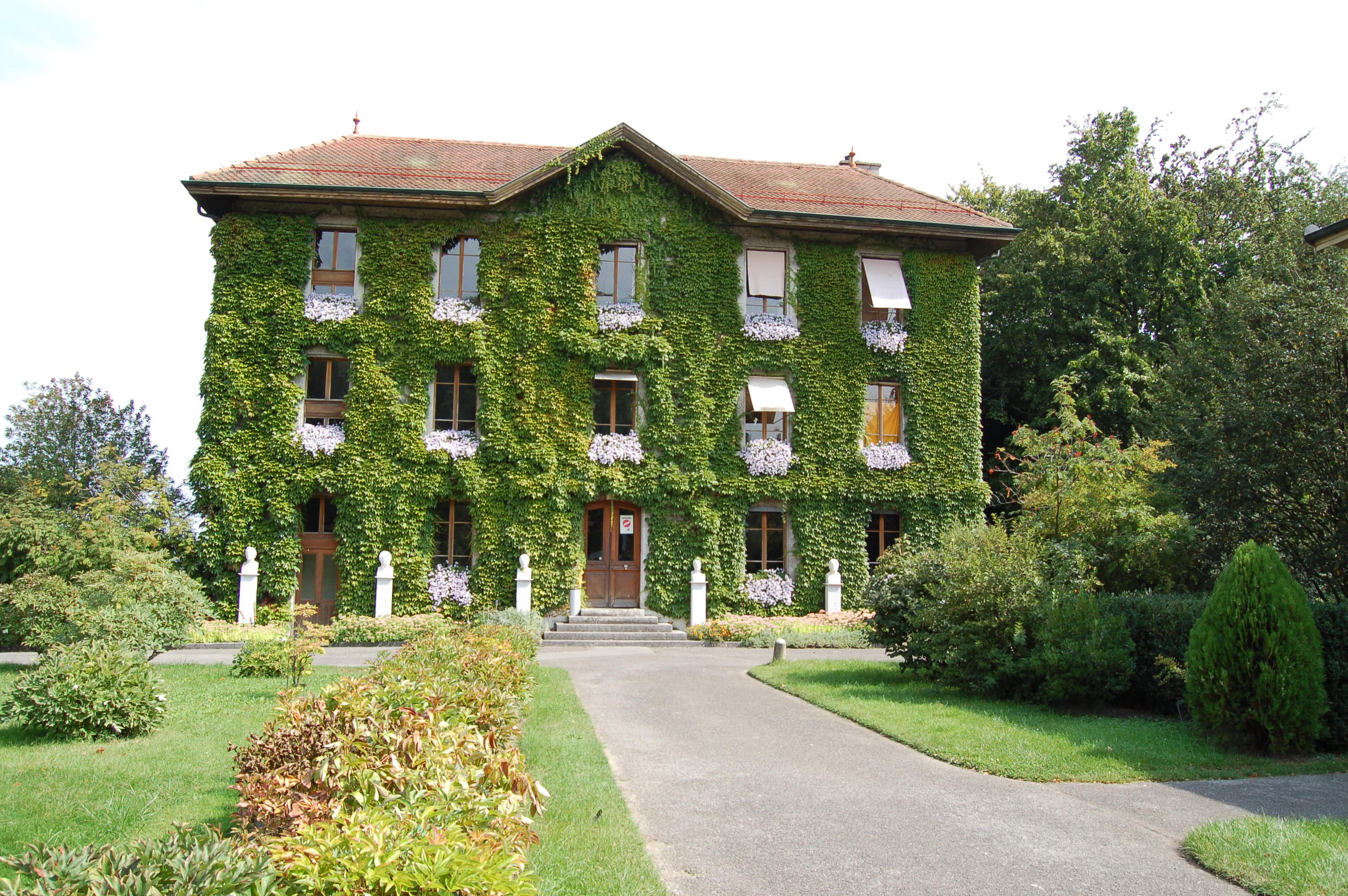
Geneva Botanical Garden

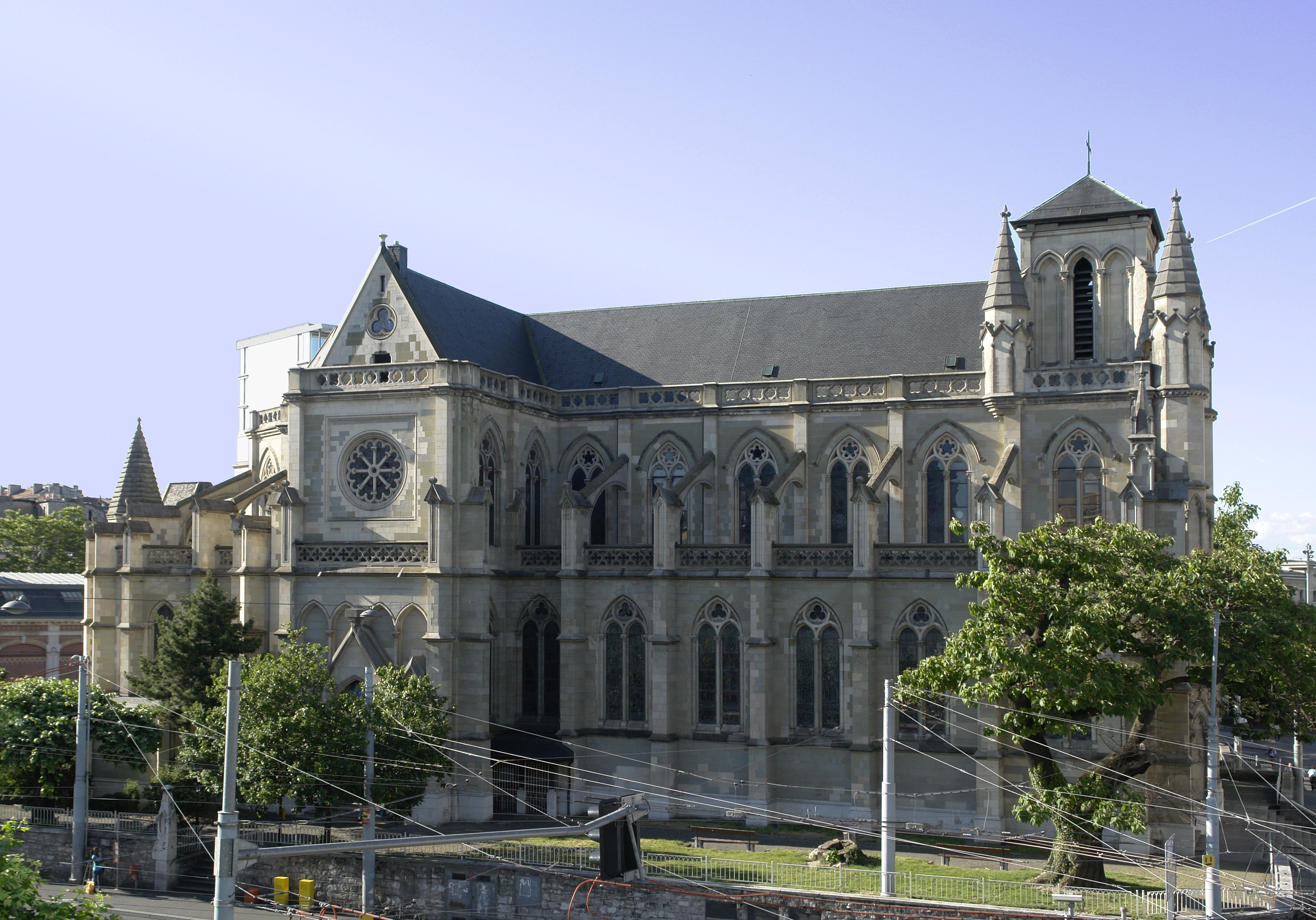
Notre-Dame Church

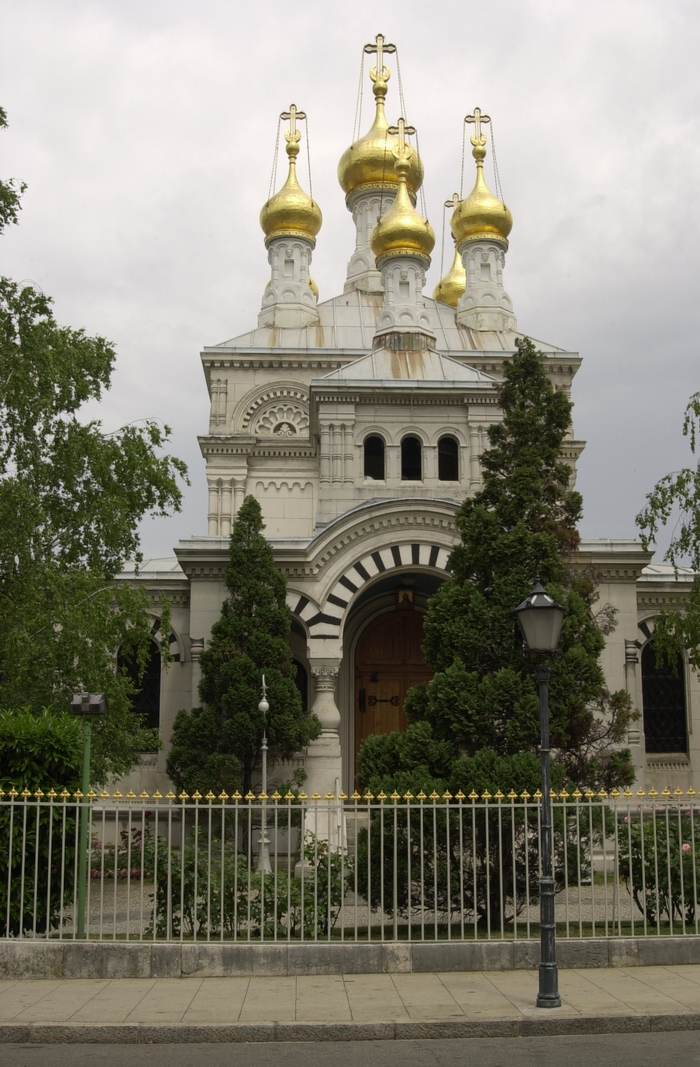
Russian Orthodox Church

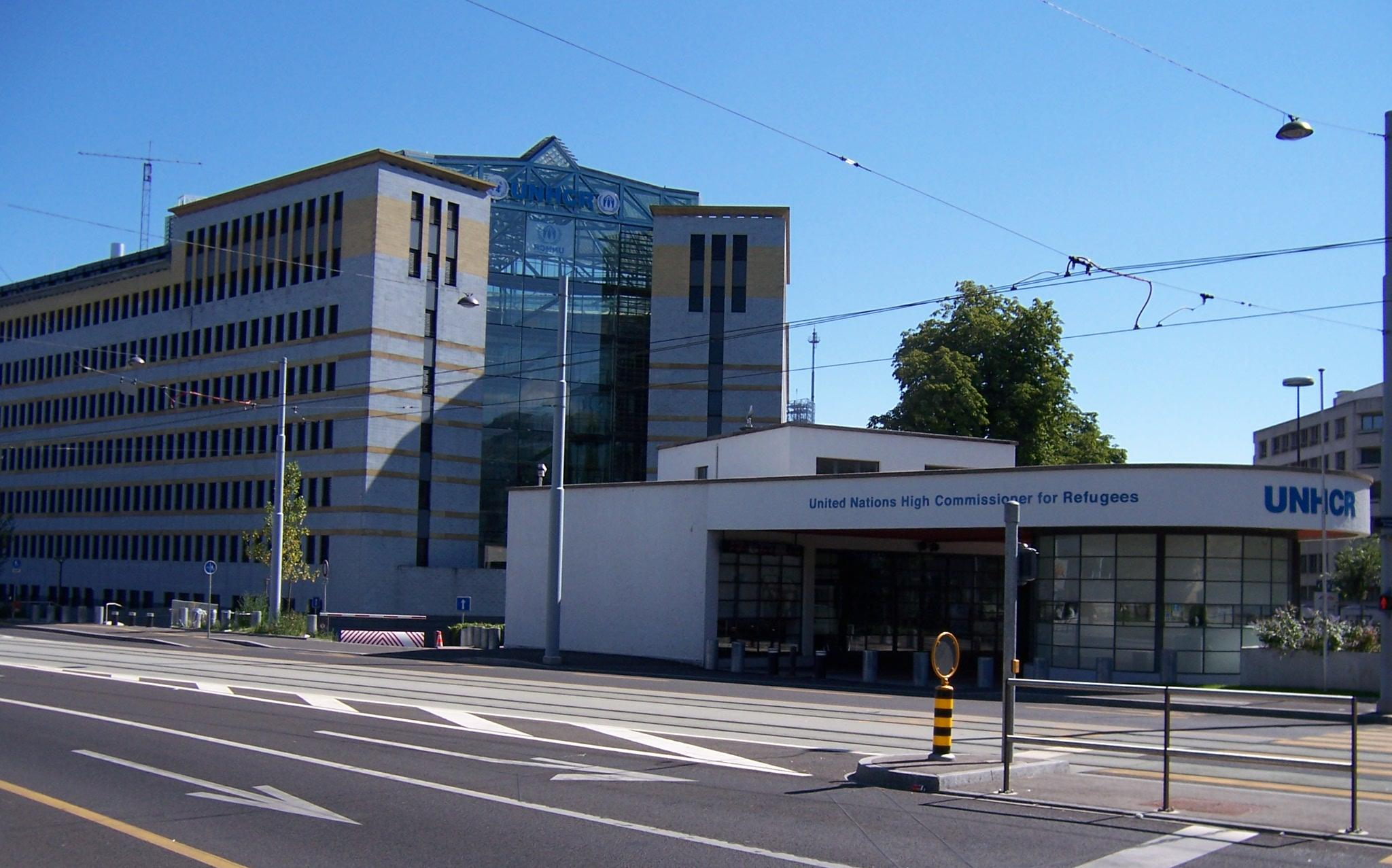
United Nations High Commissioner for Refugees (UNHCR)

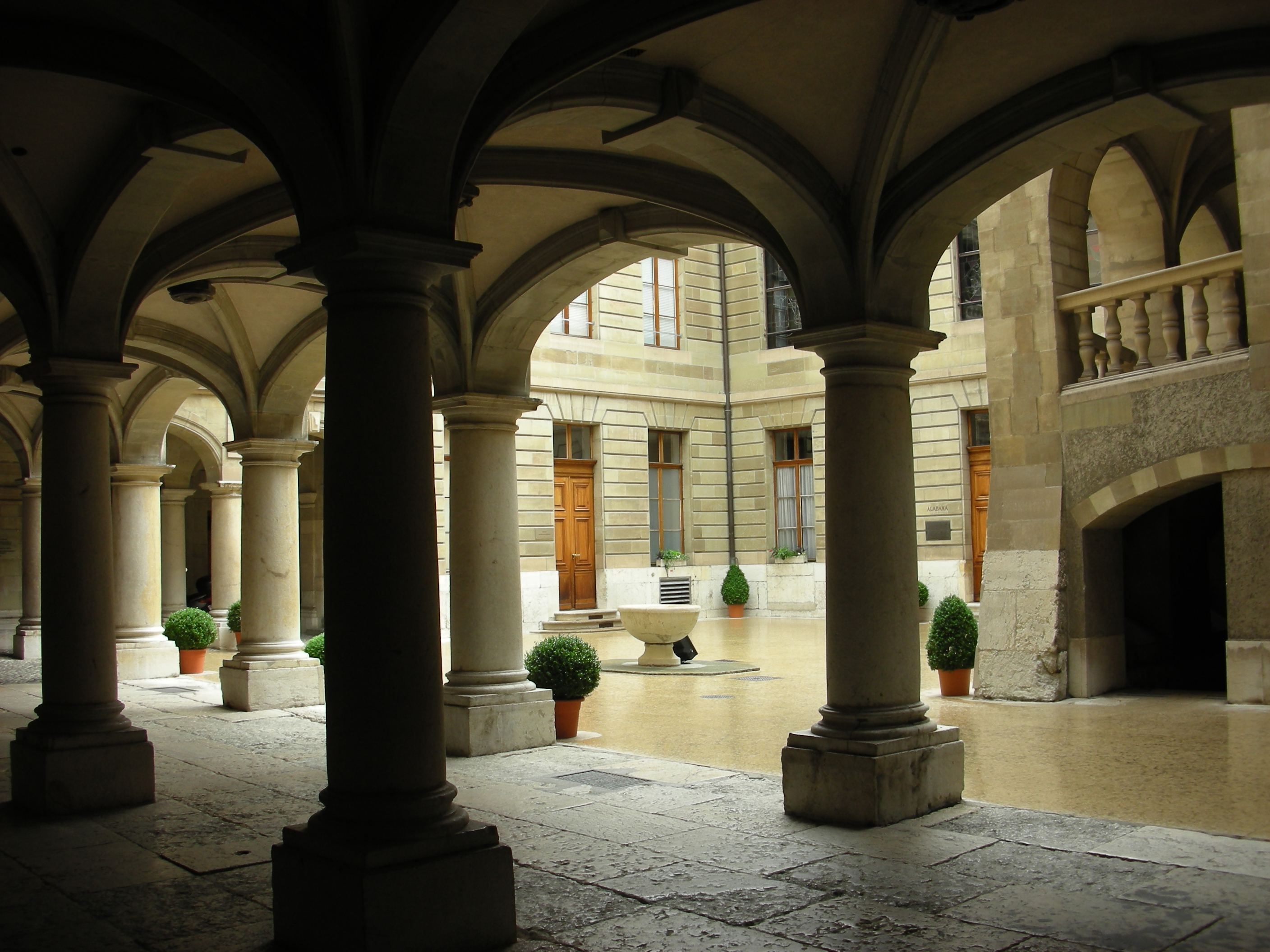
Hôtel de Ville and the Tour Baudet

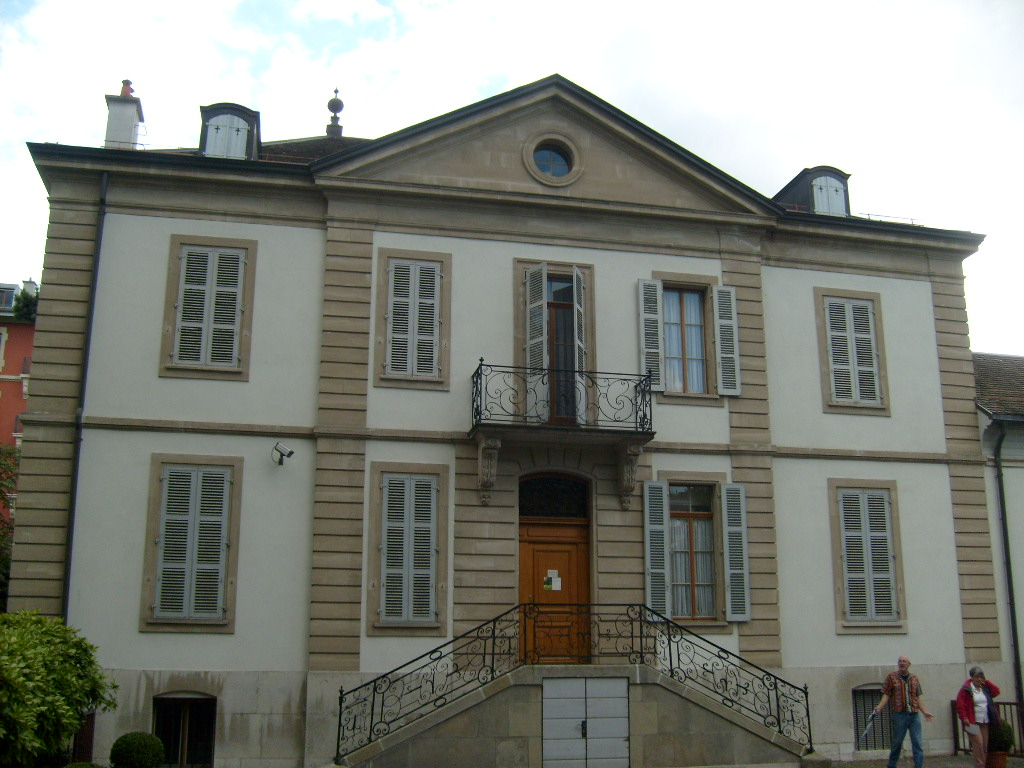
Institut et Musée Voltaire

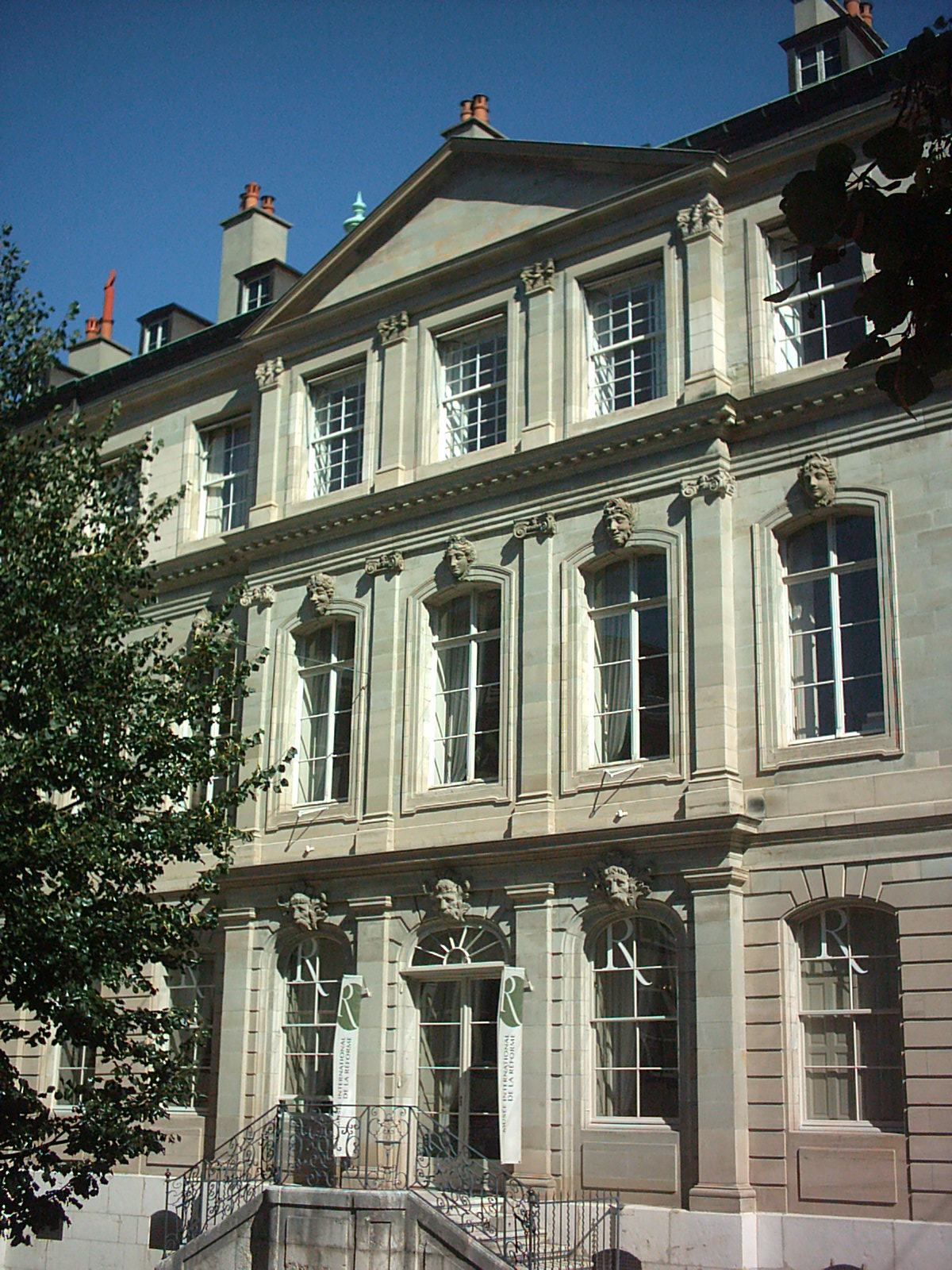
Mallet House and Museum international de la Réforme

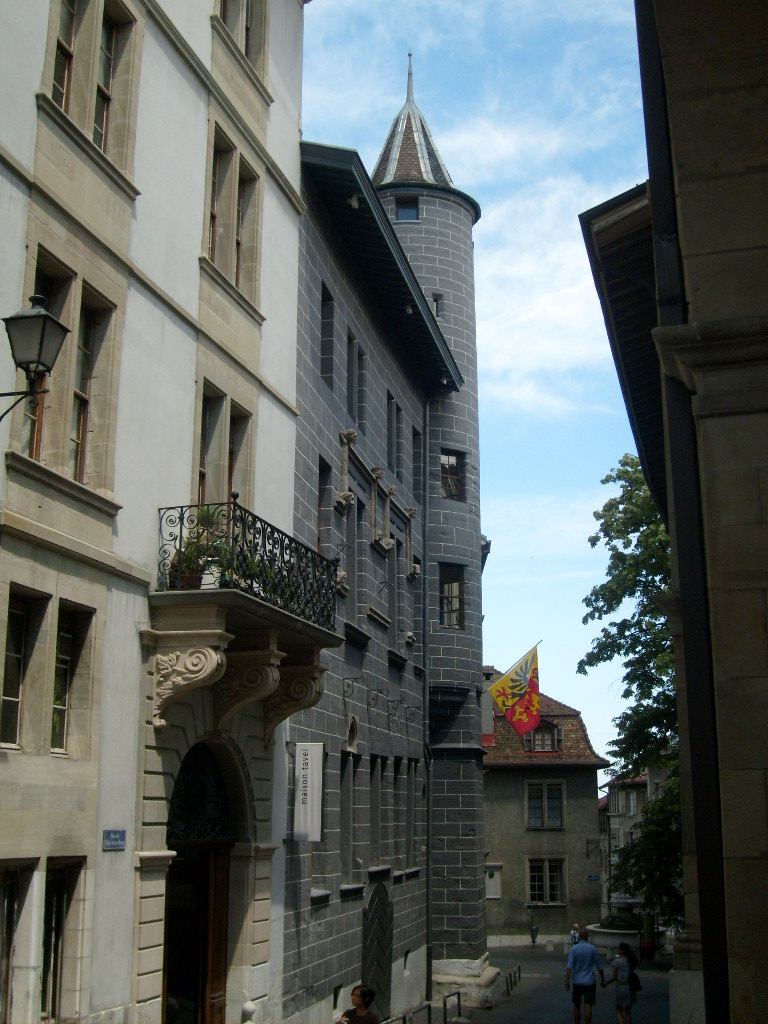
Tavel House

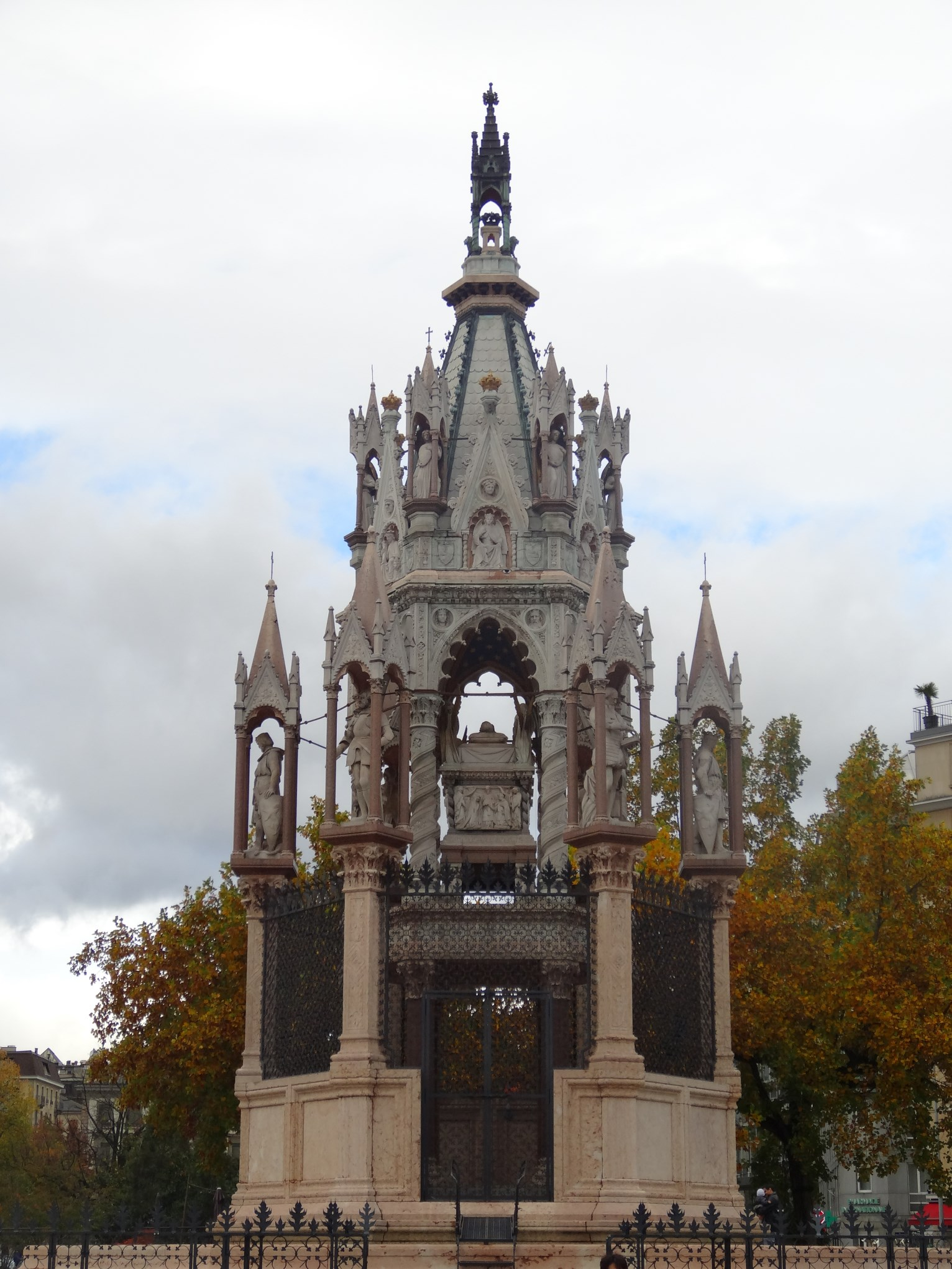
Brunswick Monument

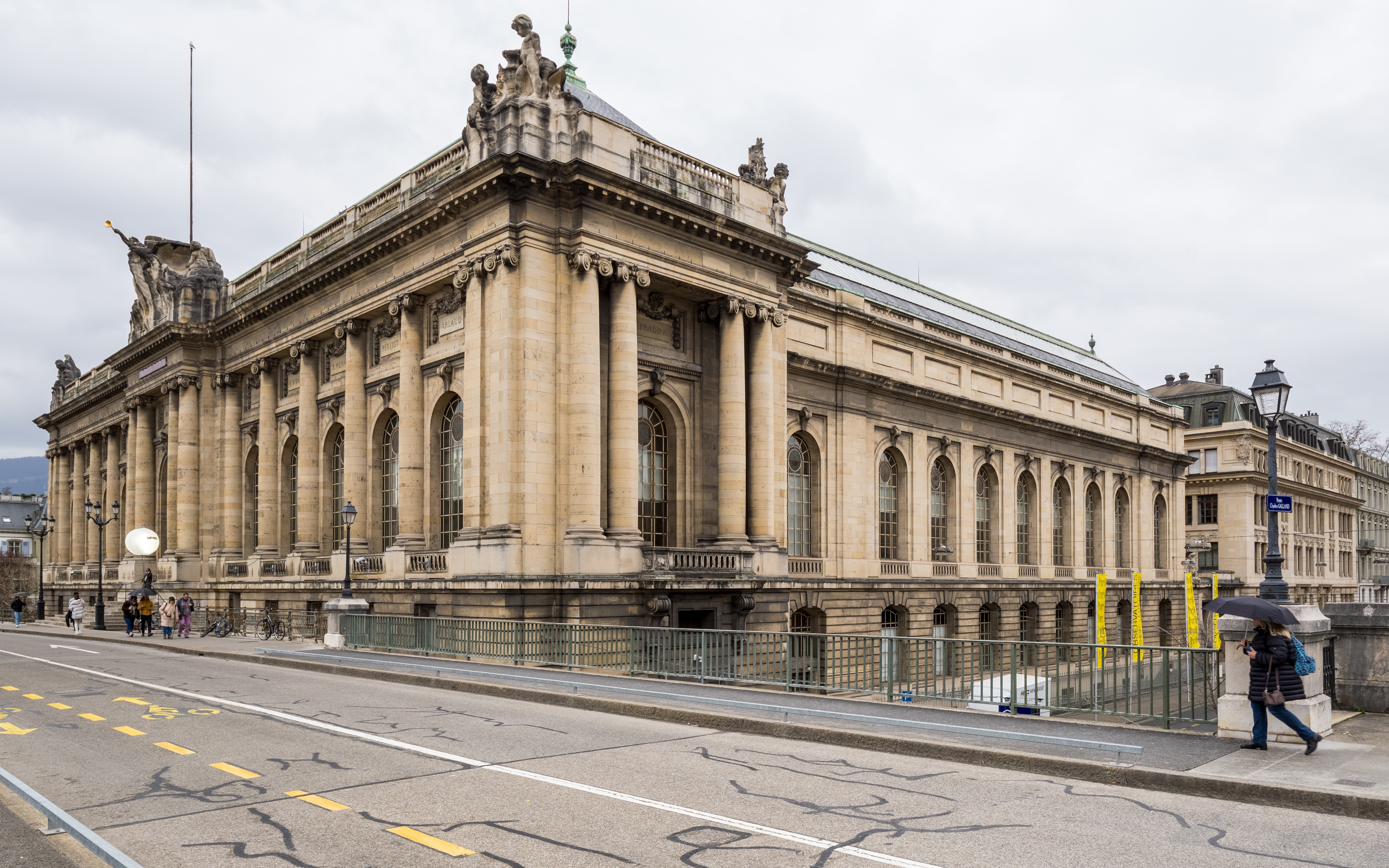
Musée d'Art et d'Histoire

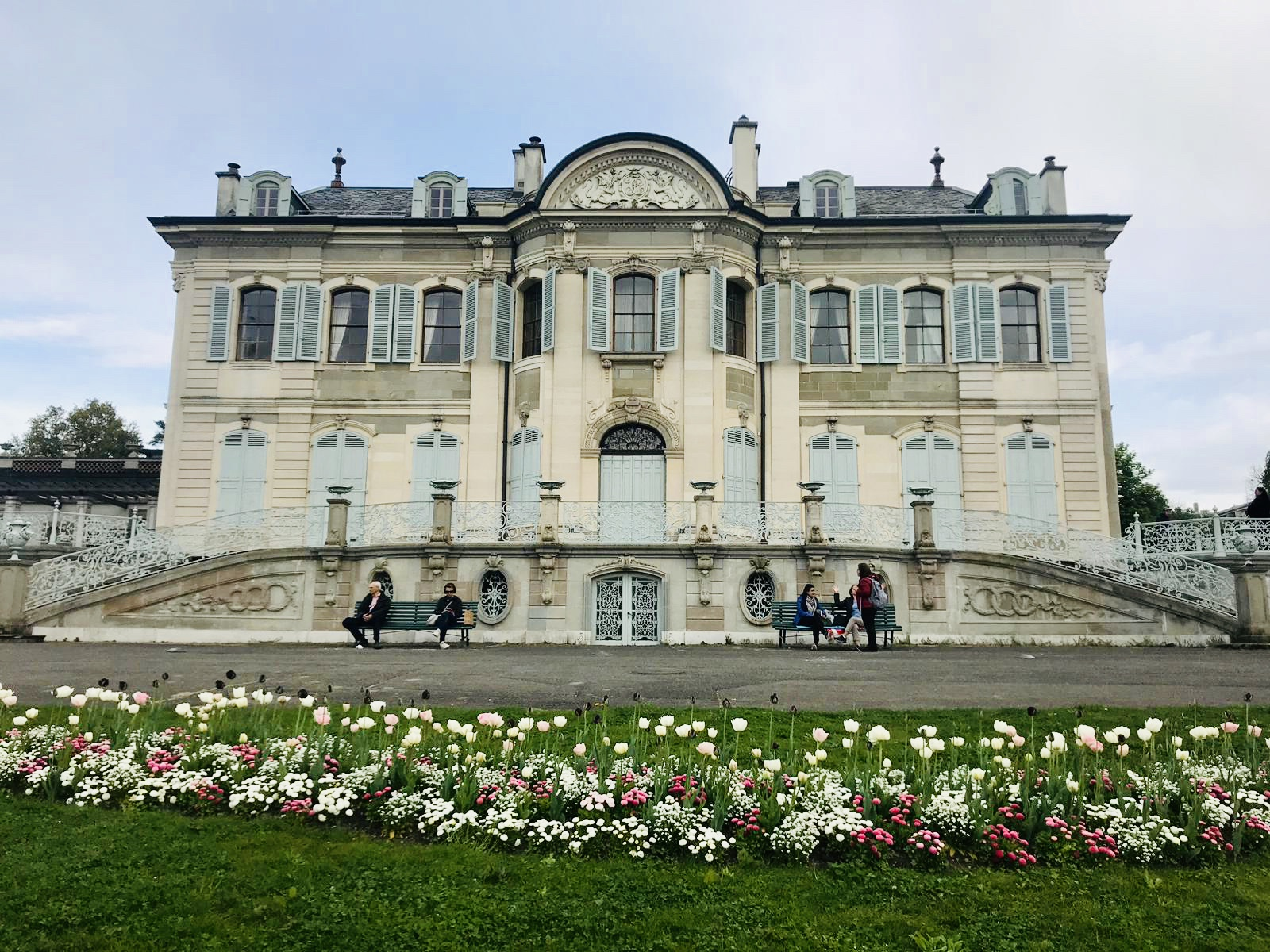
The Villa La Grange

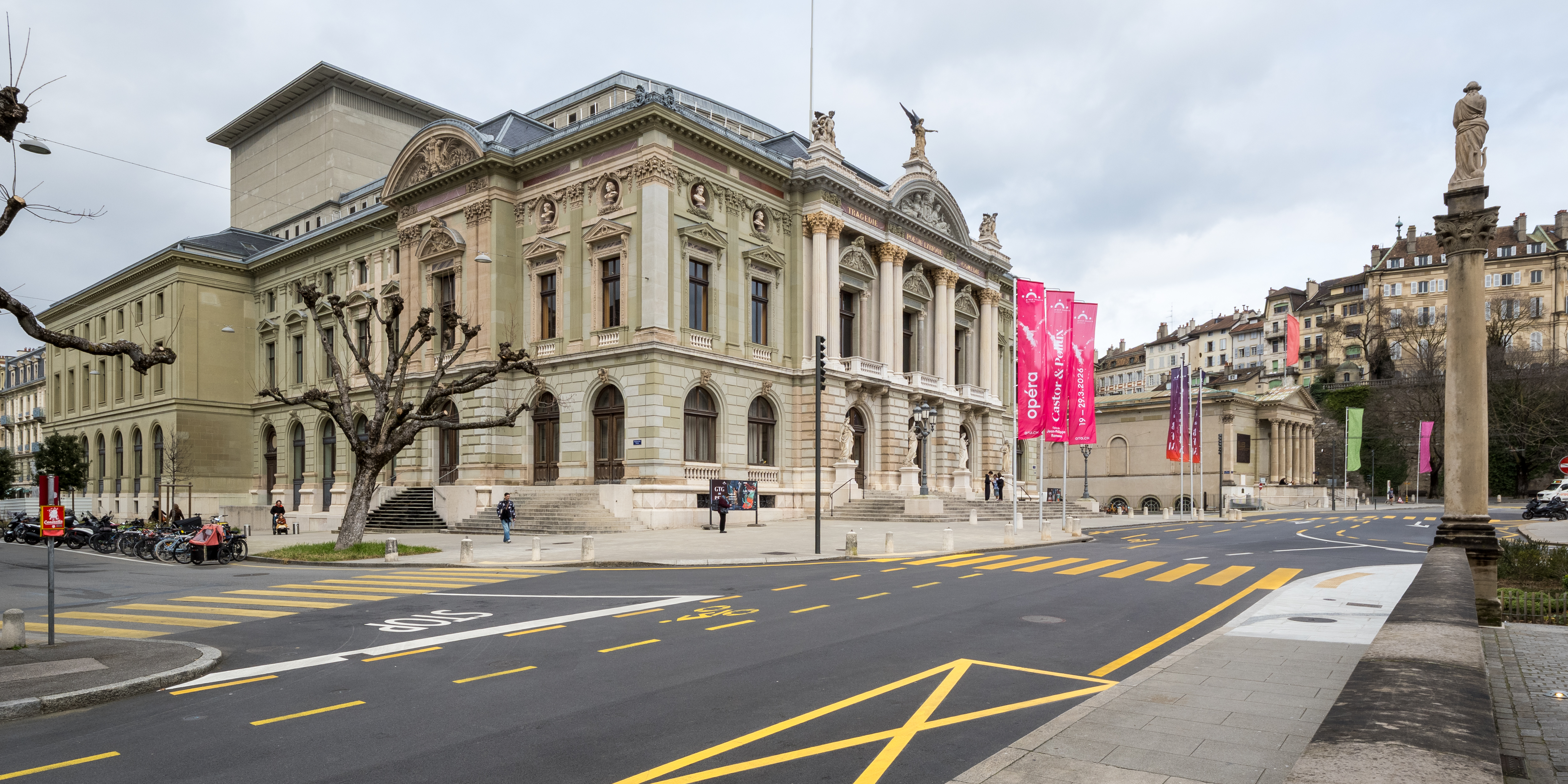
Grand Théâtre and Musée Rath

== Society and culture ==
=== Media ===
The city's main newspaper is the daily Tribune de Genève, with a readership of about 187,000. Le Courrier mainly focuses on Geneva. Both Le Temps (headquartered in Geneva) and Le Matin are widely read in Geneva, but cover the whole of the Romandy.

Geneva is the main media center for French-speaking Switzerland. It is the headquarters for the numerous French language radio and television networks of the Swiss Broadcasting Corporation, known collectively as Radio Télévision Suisse. While both networks cover the whole Romandy, special programs related to Geneva are sometimes broadcast on some of the local radio frequencies. Other local radio stations broadcast from the city, including YesFM (FM 91.8 MHz), Radio Cité (non-commercial radio, FM 92.2 MHz), OneFM (FM 107.0 MHz, also broadcast in Vaud), and World Radio Switzerland (FM 88.4 MHz). Léman Bleu is a local TV channel, founded in 1996 and distributed by cable. Due to the proximity to France, many French television channels are also available.

=== Traditions and customs ===
Geneva observes Jeûne genevois on the first Thursday following the first Sunday in September. By local tradition, this commemorates the date news of the St. Bartholomew's Day massacre of Huguenots reached Geneva.

Geneva celebrates L'Escalade on the weekend nearest 12 December, celebrating the defeat of the surprise attack of troops sent by Charles Emmanuel I, Duke of Savoy during the night of 11–12 December 1602. Festive traditions include chocolate cauldrons filled with vegetable-shaped marzipan treats and the Escalade procession on horseback in seventeenth century armour. Geneva has also been organising a Escalade race, usually during the first week-end of December. This race takes place around Geneva's Old Town, and with more that 50,000 participants is the largest in the country. Non-competitive racers dress up in fancy costumes, while walking in the race.

The Société des Vieux-Grenadiers is a local gentlemen's club founded in 1749 and regroups the local political and economical elite. The society has a military branch performing during official events since the late XIXth century.

Since 1818, a particular chestnut tree has been used as the official "herald of the spring" in Geneva. The sautier (secretary of the Parliament of the Canton of Geneva) observes the tree and notes the day of arrival of the first bud. While this event has no practical effect, the sautier issues a formal press release and the local newspaper will usually mention the news.

As this is one of the world's oldest records of a plant's reaction to climatic conditions, researchers have been interested to note that the first bud has been appearing earlier and earlier in the year. During the 19th century many dates were in March or April. In recent years, they have usually been in late February (sometimes earlier). In 2002, the first bud appeared unusually early, on 7 February, and then again on 29 December of the same year. The following year, one of the hottest years recorded in Europe, was a year with no bud. In 2008, the first bud also appeared early, on 19 February.

=== Music and festivals ===
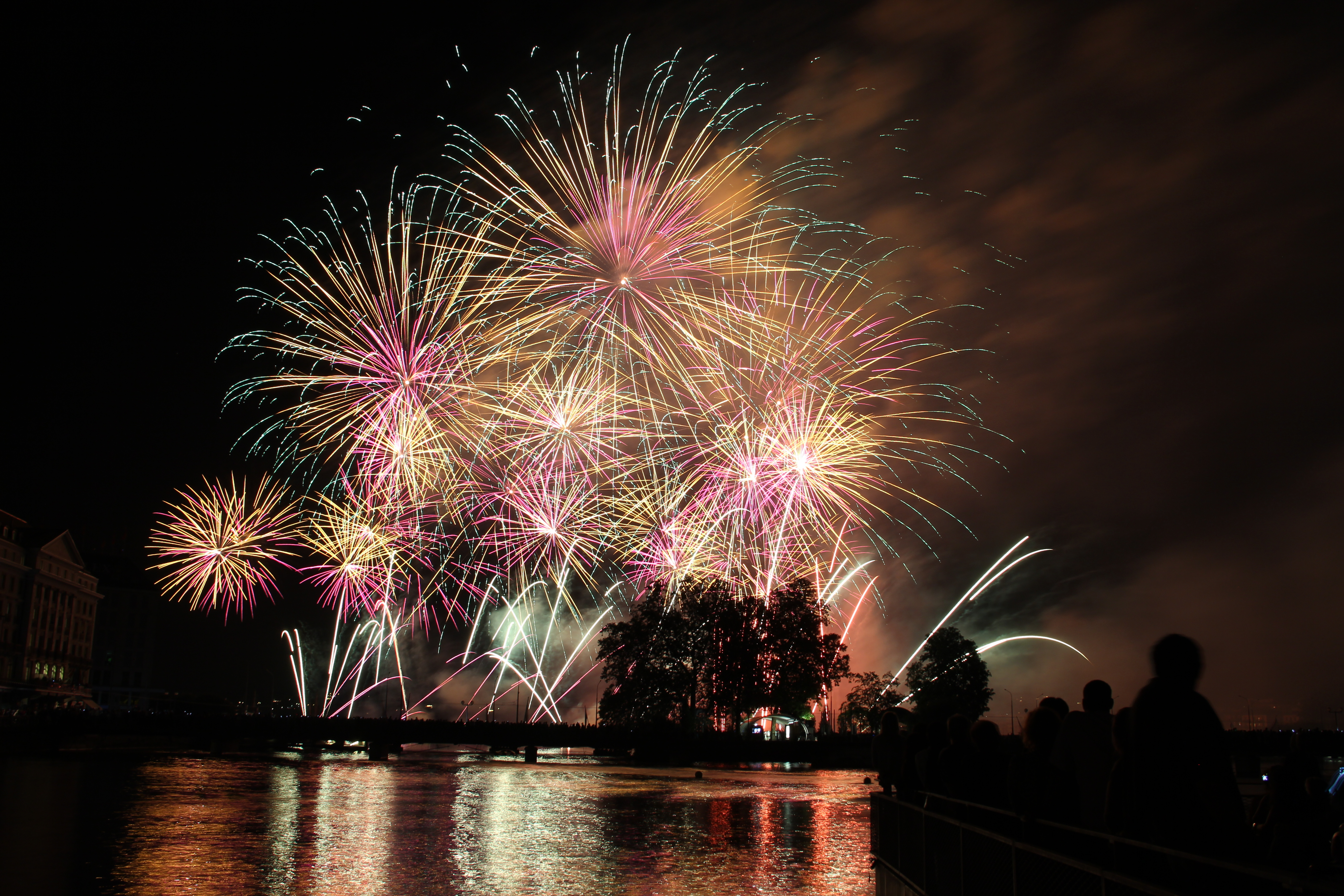
Fireworks at the Fêtes de Genève, 2012

The opera house, the Grand Théâtre de Genève, which officially opened in 1876, was partly destroyed by a fire in 1951 and reopened in 1962. It has the largest stage in Switzerland. It features opera and dance performances, recitals, concerts and, occasionally, theatre. The Victoria Hall is used for classical music concerts. It is the home of the Orchestre de la Suisse Romande.

Every summer the Fêtes de Genève (Geneva Festival) are organised in Geneva. According to Radio Télévision Suisse in 2013 hundreds of thousands of people came to Geneva to see the annual hour-long grand firework display of the Fêtes de Genève.

An annual music festival takes place in June. Groups of artists perform in different parts of the city. In 2016 the festival celebrated its 25th anniversary.

Further annual festivals are the Fête de l'Olivier, a festival of Arabic music, organised by the ICAM since 1980, and the Genevan Brass Festival, founded by Christophe Sturzenegger in 2010.

== Education ==
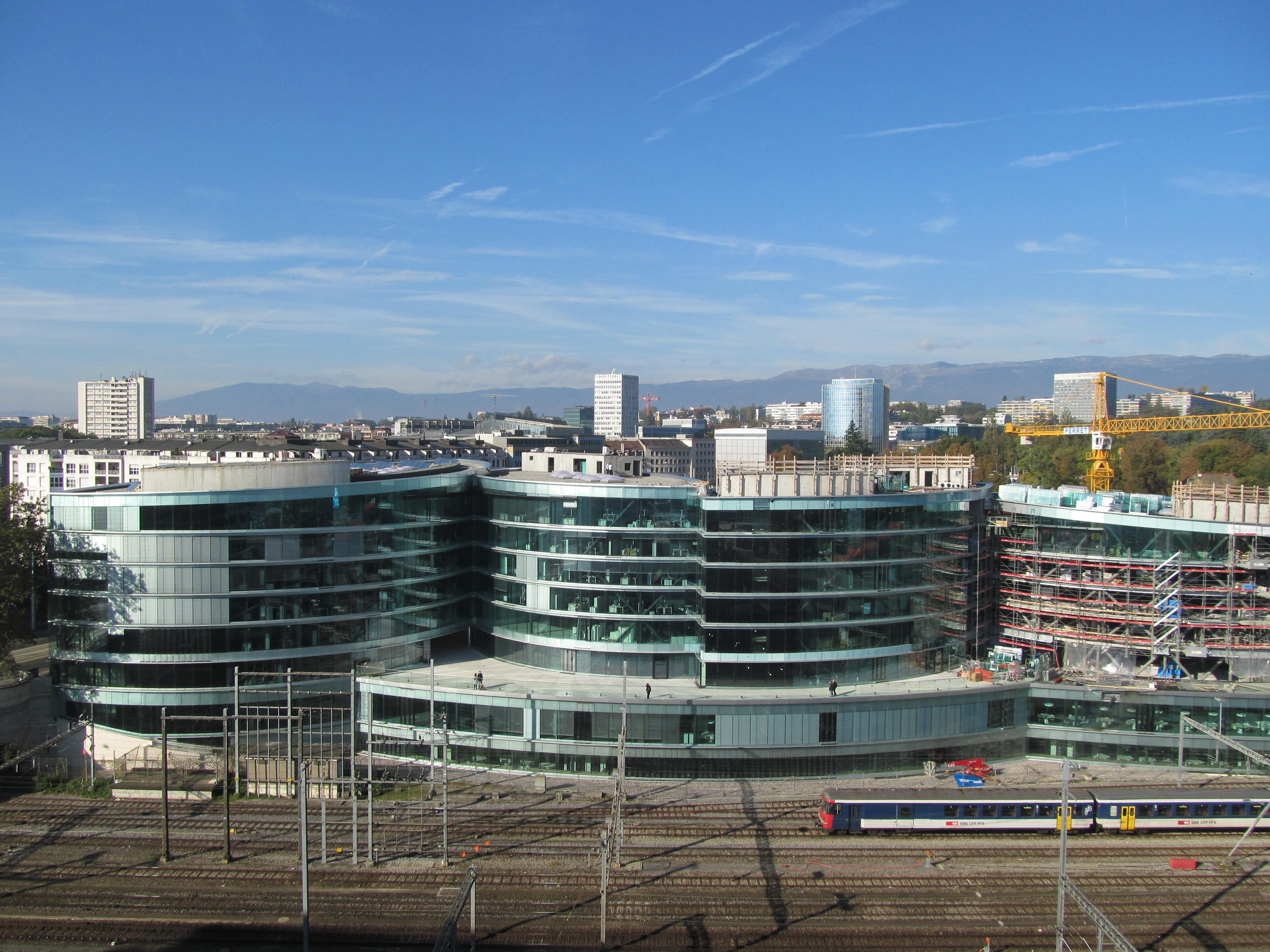
Geneva Graduate Institute

The Canton of Geneva's public school system has écoles primaires (ages 4–12) and cycles d'orientation (ages 12–15). Students can leave school at 15, but secondary education is provided by collèges (ages 15–19), the oldest of which is the Collège Calvin, which could be considered one of the oldest public schools in the world, écoles de culture générale (15–18/19) and the écoles professionnelles (15–18/19). The écoles professionnelles offer full-time courses and part-time study as part of an apprenticeship. Geneva also has a number of private schools.

In 2011 89,244 (37.0%) of the population had completed non-mandatory upper secondary education, and 107,060 or (44.3%) had completed additional higher education (either university or a Fachhochschule). Of the 107,060 who completed tertiary schooling, 32.5% were Swiss men, 31.6% were Swiss women, 18.1% were non-Swiss men and 17.8% were non-Swiss women.

During the 2011–2012 school year, there were a total of 92,311 students in the Geneva school system (primary to university). The education system in the Canton of Geneva has eight years of primary school, with 32,716 students. The secondary school program consists of three lower, obligatory years of schooling, followed by three to five years of optional, advanced study. There were 13,146 lower-secondary students who attended schools in Geneva. There were 10,486 upper-secondary students from the municipality along with 10,330 students who were in a professional, non-university track program. An additional 11,797 students were attending private schools.

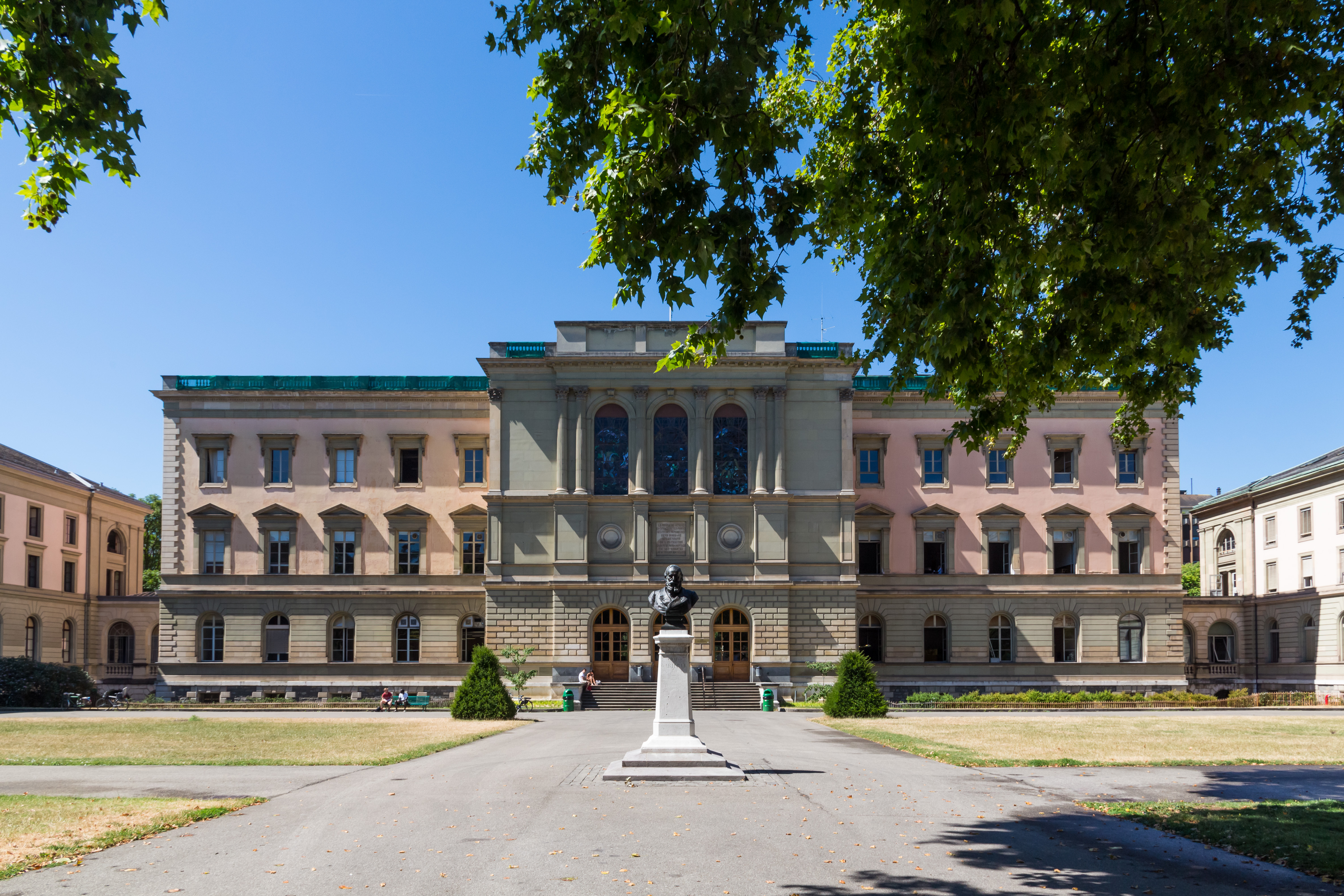
The University of Geneva

Geneva is home to a large university, the University of Geneva, and several smaller, for the most part highly specialized universities, including the Geneva Graduate Institute, the Geneva University of Art and Design, the Geneva University of Music, the Haute école du Paysage, d'Ingénierie et d'Architecture, the Haute école de gestion de Genève, the Haute école de santé de Genève, the Haute école de travail social de Genève, the International University in Geneva and Webster University's Geneva campus.

The University of Geneva's student enrolls 16,500 students. It was founded in 1559 by John Calvin as the Geneva Academy, a theological and humanist seminary. In the 19th century the academy lost its ecclesiastic links, and in 1873, with the addition of a medical faculty, it acquired its current name. In 2011 it was ranked 35th European university.

The Geneva Graduate Institute, with a student body of nearly 1,100 students studying the main social science disciplines and international law, is the largest of the city's smaller universities. It is among Europe's oldest institutions dedicated to the study of international relations. Its departments of international relations and international law are highly regarded globally.

Geneva is also home to more than a dozen for-profit private universities whose activities have come under scrutiny for offering degrees that are not recognized by standard higher education accreditation regulators, and have been accused in the media of engaging in "unscrupulous practices". These schools include the Geneva School of Diplomacy and International Relations, the Geneva Business School and IFM Business School.

At the secondary school level, Geneva is home to the world's oldest international school: the International School of Geneva, founded in 1924 along with the League of Nations.

Founded in 1954, CERN was one of Europe's first joint ventures and has developed as the world's largest particle physics laboratory. Physicists from around the world travel to CERN to research matter and explore the fundamental forces and materials that form the universe. It hosts the Large Hadron Collider.

Geneva is home to six major libraries, the Bibliothèques municipales Genève, the Haute école de travail social, the Institut d'études sociales, the Haute école de santé, the École d'ingénieurs de Genève, the Haute école d'art et de design and Kathryn and Shelby Cullom Davis Library at the Geneva Graduate Institute. There were (as of 2008) 877,680 books or other media in the libraries, and in the same year 1,798,980 items were loaned.

== Economy ==
Geneva's economy is largely service-driven and closely linked to the rest of the canton. The city is one of the global leaders in financial centres. Three main sectors dominate the financial sector: commodity trading; trade finance, and wealth management.

Around a third of the world's free traded oil, sugar, grains and oil seeds is traded in Geneva. Approximately 22% of the world's cotton is traded in the Lake Geneva region. Other major commodities traded in the canton include steel, electricity, or coffee. Large trading companies have their regional or global headquarters in the canton, such as Bunge, Cargill, Vitol, Gunvor, BNP Paribas, Trafigura or Mercuria Energy Group, in addition to being home to the world's largest shipping company, Mediterranean Shipping Company. Commodity trading is sustained by a strong trade finance sector, with large banks such as BCGE, BCP, BNP Paribas, BCV, Crédit Agricole, Credit Suisse, ING, Société Générale, and UBS, all having their headquarters in the area for this business.

Wealth management is dominated by non-publicly listed banks and private banks, particularly Pictet, Lombard Odier, Edmond de Rothschild Group, Union Bancaire Privée, Mirabaud Group, Dukascopy Bank, Bordier & Cie, Banque SYZ, or REYL & Cie. In addition, the canton is home to the largest concentration of foreign-owned banks in Switzerland, such as HSBC Private Bank, JPMorgan Chase, or Arab Bank.

Behind the financial sector, the next largest major economic sector is watchmaking, dominated by luxury firms such as Patek Philippe, Vacheron Constantin, Chopard, Piaget, Rolex, Roger Dubuis, Franck Muller, F. P. Journe and others, whose factories are concentrated in the Les Acacias neighbourhood, as well as the neighbouring municipalities of Plan-les-Ouates, Satigny, and Meyrin.

Trade finance, wealth management, and watchmaking, approximately contribute two thirds of the corporate tax paid in the canton

Other large multinationals are also headquartered in the city and canton, such as Firmenich (in Satigny), and Givaudan (in Vernier), the world's two largest manufacturers of flavours, fragrances and active cosmetic ingredients; SGS, the world's largest inspection, verification, testing and certification services company; Temenos, a large banking software provider; or the local headquarters for Procter & Gamble, Japan Tobacco International, or L'Oréal (in Vernier).

The city of Geneva is also host to one of the world's largest concentrations of international organisations and UN agencies, such as the Red Cross, the World Health Organization, the World Trade Organization, the International Telecommunication Union, the World Intellectual Property Organization, the World Meteorological Organization, and the International Labour Organization, as well as the European headquarters of the United Nations.

The citys international mindedness, well-connected airport, and centrality in the continent, also make Geneva a popular destination for congresses and trade fairs, of which the largest was the Geneva Motor Show held in Palexpo.

Agriculture is commonplace in the hinterlands of Geneva, particularly wheat and wine. Despite its relatively small size, the canton produces around 10% of the Swiss wine and has the highest vineyard density in the country. The largest strains grown in Geneva are gamay, chasselas, pinot noir, gamaret, and chardonnay.

As of 2019, Geneva had an unemployment rate of 3.9%. 9,783 people were employed in the secondary sector and there were 1,200 businesses in this sector. 134,429 people were employed in the tertiary sector, with 12,489 businesses in this sector. There were 91,880 residents of the municipality who were employed in some capacity, with women making up 47.7% of the workforce.

In 2008, the total number of full-time equivalent jobs was 124,185. The number of jobs in the primary sector was four, all of which were in agriculture. The number of jobs in the secondary sector was 9,363 of which 4,863 or (51.9%) were in manufacturing and 4,451 (47.5%) were in construction. The number of jobs in the tertiary sector was 114,818. In the tertiary sector; 16,573 or 14.4% were in wholesale or retail sales or the repair of motor vehicles, 3,474 or 3.0% were in the movement and storage of goods, 9,484 or 8.3% were in a hotel or restaurant, 4,544 or 4.0% were in the information industry, 20,982 or 18.3% were the insurance or financial industry, 12,177 or 10.6% were technical professionals or scientists, 10,007 or 8.7% were in education and 15,029 or 13.1% were in health care.

In 2000, there were 95,190 workers who commuted into the municipality and 25,920 workers who commuted away. The municipality is a net importer of workers, with about 3.7 workers entering the municipality for every one leaving. About 13.8% of the workforce coming into Geneva are coming from outside Switzerland, while 0.4% of the locals commute out of Switzerland for work. Of the working population, 38.2% used public transportation to get to work, and 30.6% used a private car.

== Sport ==
Ice hockey is one of the most popular sports in Geneva. Geneva is home to Genève-Servette HC, which plays in the National League (NL). They play their home games in the 7,135-seat Patinoire des Vernets. In 2008, 2010 and 2021 the team made it to the league finals but lost to the ZSC Lions, SC Bern and EV Zug respectively. The team eventually won its first championship in 2023. They won game 7 at home against EHC Biel in a packed Patinoire des Vernets and with an estimated 7,000 more fans watching the game on a giant TV screen in front of the arena. The following season, the team went on to win the Champions Hockey League in February 2024. They won their first European title in a packed Patinoire des Vernets and with an estimated 5,000 more fans watching the game in a fanzone in front of the arena. Historically, the team was by far the most popular one in both the city and the canton of Geneva, drawing three times more spectators than the football team in 2017.

Football is also popular and the town is home to Servette FC, a club founded in 1890 and named after a borough on the right bank of the Rhône. It is the most successful football club in Romandy, and the third in Switzerland overall, with 17 league titles and 8 Swiss Cups. The home of Servette FC is the 30,000-seat Stade de Genève. Servette FC plays in the Credit Suisse Super League. Its women's team, Servette FC Chênois Féminin, plays in the top tier AXA Women's Super League. They play their home games in the 4,000-seat Stade des Trois-Chêne. Its latest achievement is the Swiss championship title in 2024. Étoile Carouge FC is another football team that currently competes in the second tier Challenge League. They play their home games in the 3,600-seat Stade de la Fontenette.

Geneva is also home to a semi-pro basketball team, Lions de Genève, 2013 and 2015 champions of the Swiss Basketball League. The team plays its home games in the Pavilion des Sports.

Additionally, Geneva is home to an amateur rugby team, Servette RC, that currently competes in the fourth tier of French rugby.

The Geneva Seahawks, established in 1986, are an amateur American football team that currently plays in the Nationalliga A. The Seahawks have reached the Swiss Bowl final six times winning the championship in 1991. The team currently plays home games at Vessy Sports Center.

== Infrastructure ==
=== Transportation ===
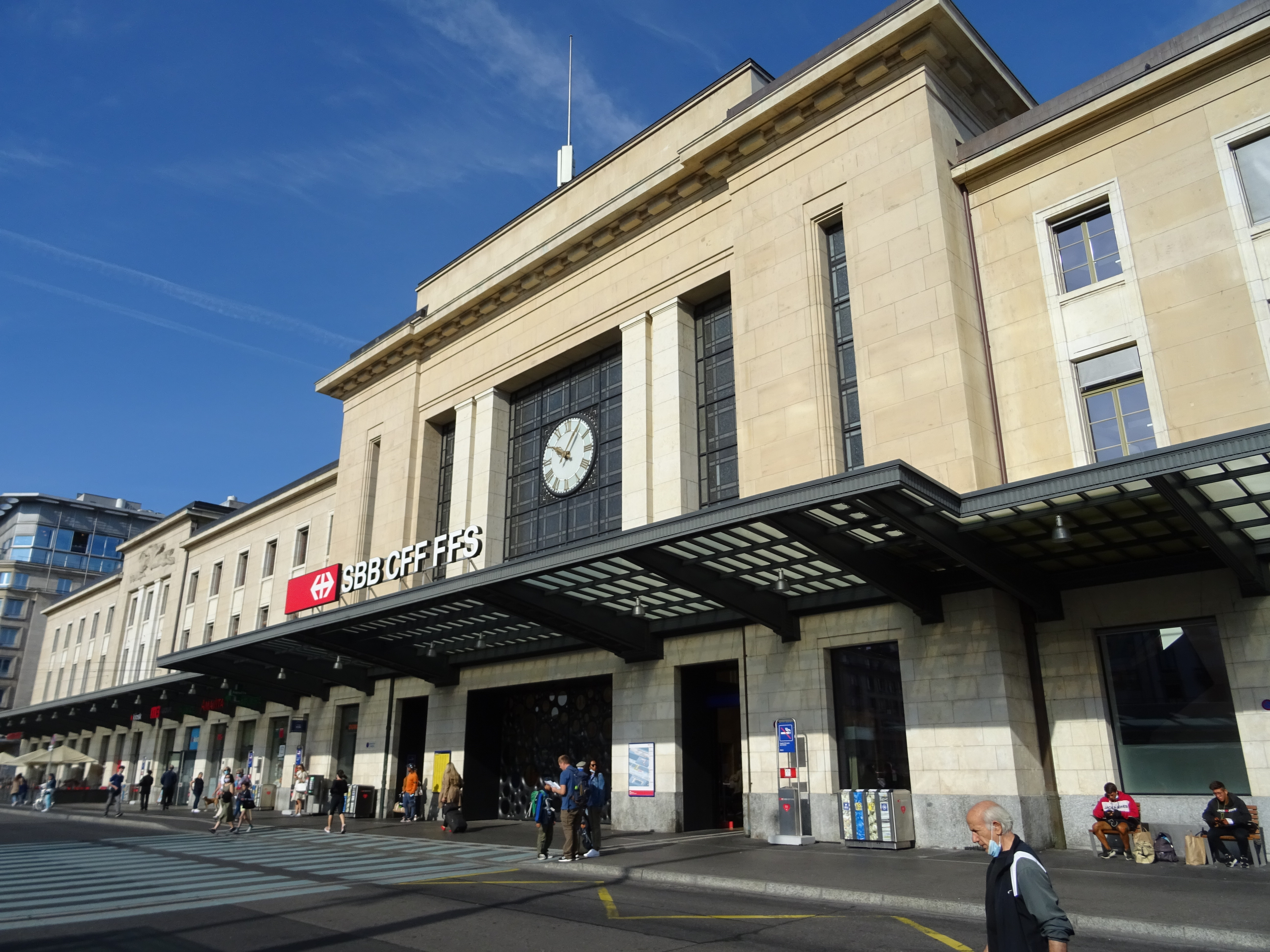
Geneva railway station

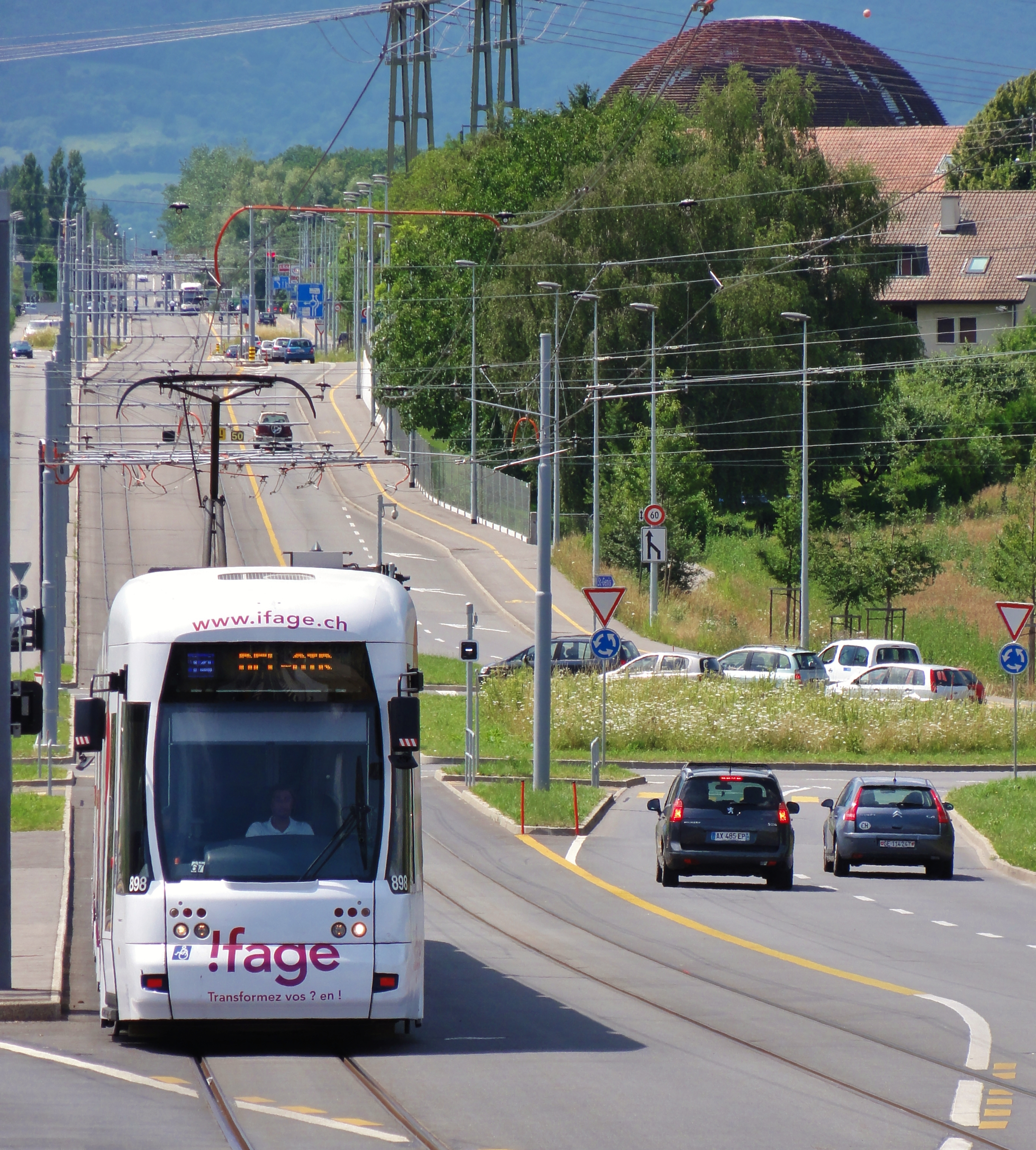
TCMC (Tramway Cornavin – Meyrin – CERN)

The city is served by the Geneva Airport. It is connected by Geneva Airport railway station (French: Gare de Genève-Aéroport) to both the Swiss Federal Railways network and the French SNCF network, including links to Paris, Lyon, Marseille and Montpellier by TGV. Geneva is connected to the motorway systems of both Switzerland (A1 motorway) and France.

Public transport by bus, trolleybus or tram is provided by Transports Publics Genevois (commonly referred to as TPG). In addition to an extensive coverage of the city centre, the network extends to most of the municipalities of the Canton, with, as of 2026, 14 bus, tram, and trolleybus lines going into France to service towns in which many cross-border workers reside. Public transport by boat is provided by the Mouettes Genevoises, which link the two banks of the lake within the city, and by the Compagnie Générale de Navigation sur le lac Léman which serves more distant destinations such as Nyon, Yvoire, Thonon, Évian, Lausanne and Montreux using both modern diesel vessels and vintage paddle steamers.

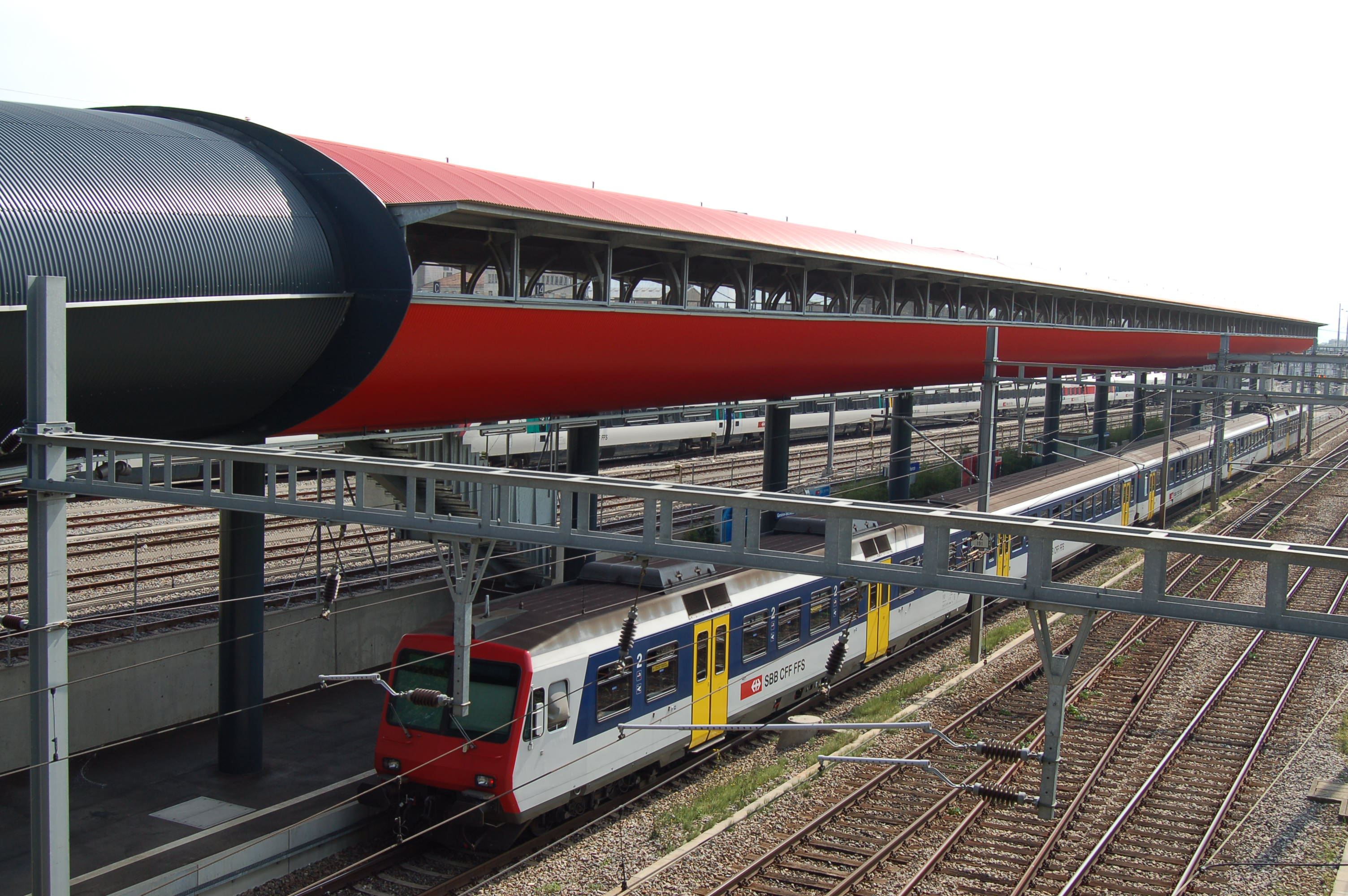
Geneva Sécheron railway station

Trains operated by Swiss Federal Railways connect the airport to the main station of Cornavin in six minutes. Regional train services have been developed to Coppet and Bellegarde. At the city limits two new railway stations have been opened since 2002: Genève-Sécheron (close to the UN and the Botanical Gardens) and Lancy-Pont-Rouge.

In 2011 work started on the CEVA rail (Cornavin – Eaux-Vives – Annemasse) project, first planned in 1884, which connects Cornavin with the Cantonal hospital, Eaux-Vives railway station and Annemasse, in France. The link between the main railway station and the classification yard of La Praille already exists; from there, the line runs mostly underground to the Hospital and Eaux-Vives, where it links to the existing line to France. The line fully opened in December 2019, as part of the Léman Express regional rail network.

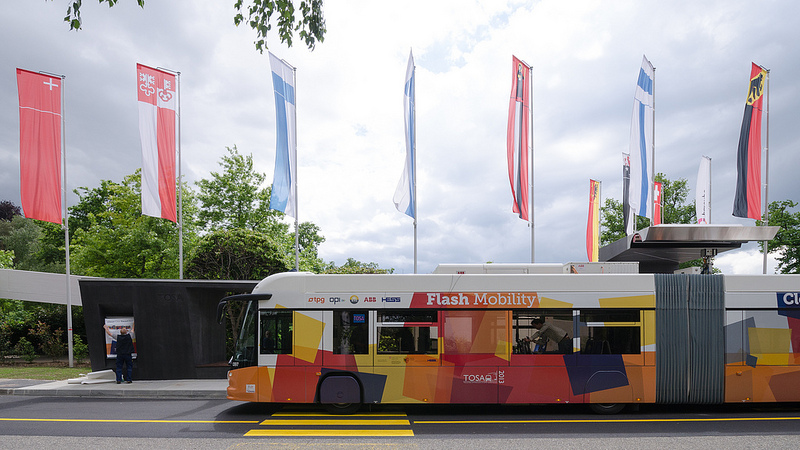
TOSA Bus at PALEXPO Flash bus stops

In May 2013, the demonstrator electric bus system with a capacity of 133 passengers commenced between Geneva Airport and Palexpo. The project aims to introduce a new system of mass transport with electric "flash" recharging of the buses at selected stops while passengers are disembarking and embarking.

Taxis in Geneva can be difficult to find, and may need to be booked in advance, especially in the early morning or at peak hours. Taxis can refuse to take babies and children because of seating legislation.

An ambitious project to close 200 streets in the centre of Geneva to cars was approved by the Geneva cantonal authorities in 2010 and was planned to be implemented over a span of four years (2010–2014), though as of 2018, work on the project has yet to be started.

=== Utilities ===
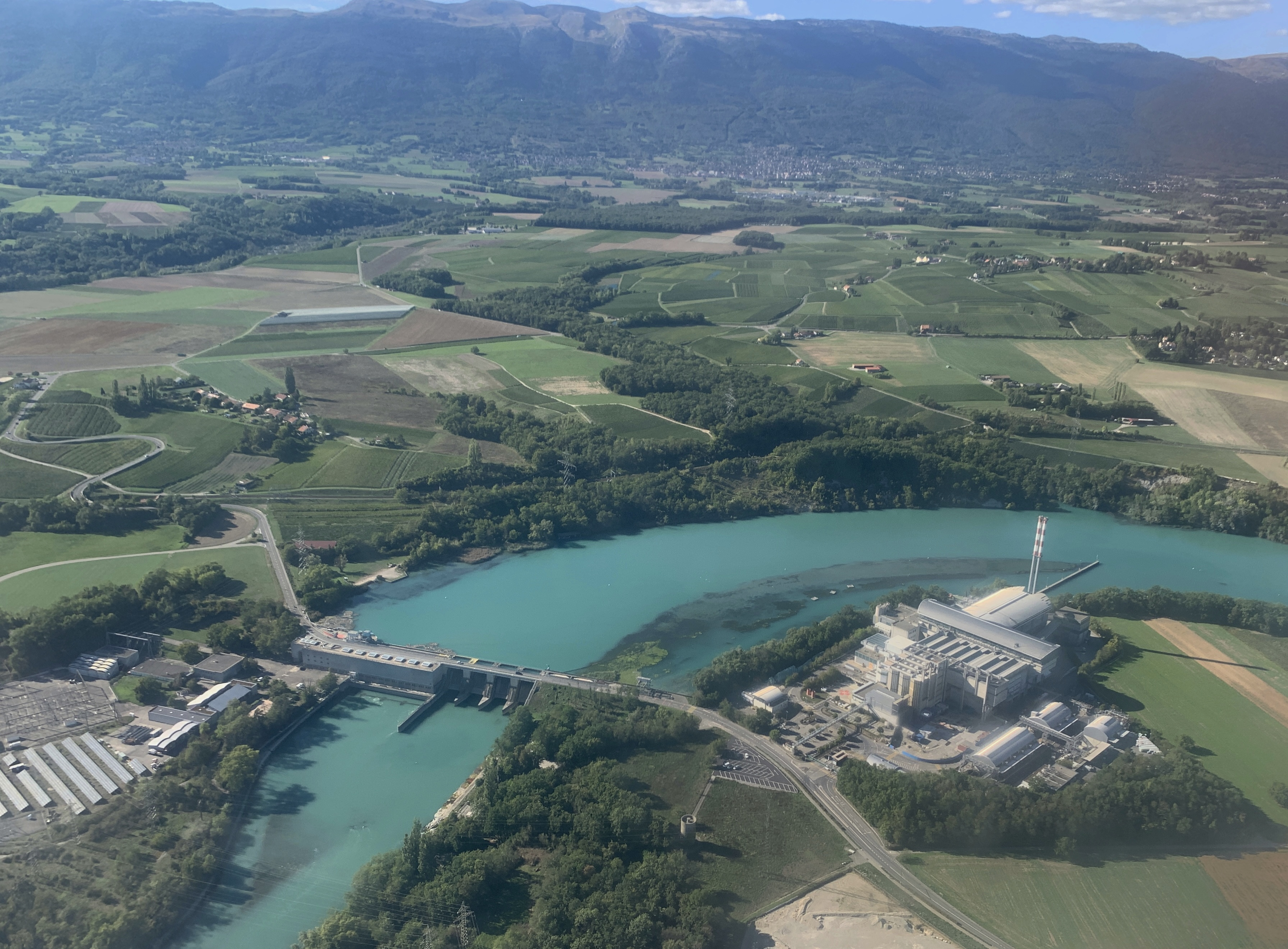
The SIG-owned incinerator of Cheneviers, Verbois dam, and the solar farm

Water, natural gas and electricity are provided to the municipalities of the Canton of Geneva by the state-owned Services Industriels de Genève, known as SIG. Most of the drinking water (80%) is extracted from the lake; the remaining 20% is provided by groundwater, originally formed by infiltration from the Arve. 30% of the Canton's electricity needs is locally produced, mainly by three hydroelectric dams on the Rhône (Seujet, Verbois and Chancy-Pougny). In addition, 13% of the electricity produced in the Canton is from the burning of waste at the waste incineration facility of Les Cheneviers. The remaining needs (57%) are covered by imports from other cantons in Switzerland or other European countries; SIG buys only electricity produced by renewable methods, and in particular does not use electricity produced using nuclear reactors or fossil fuels. Natural gas is available in the City of Geneva, as well as in about two-thirds of the municipalities of the canton, and is imported from Western Europe by the Swiss company Gaznat. SIG also provides telecommunication facilities to carriers, service providers and large enterprises. From 2003 to 2005, "Voisin, voisine" a fibre-to-the-home pilot project with a triple play offering was launched to test the end-user market in the Charmilles district.

=== Ecological infrastructure ===
In the context of the city's Climate Strategy, Geneva's Office cantonal de l'agriculture et de la nature (OCAN) has developed and sustained a network of ecological infrastructure, mainly constituted by biological corridors. Its 2021 revision of the Lighting Plan (Plan Lumière) further introduces dark infrastructure in the form of black corridors (Trame Noire). In 2024, the metropolitan area Geneva created an open data light pollution map encompassing a "dark grid".

== International organisations ==
The World Intellectual Property Organization

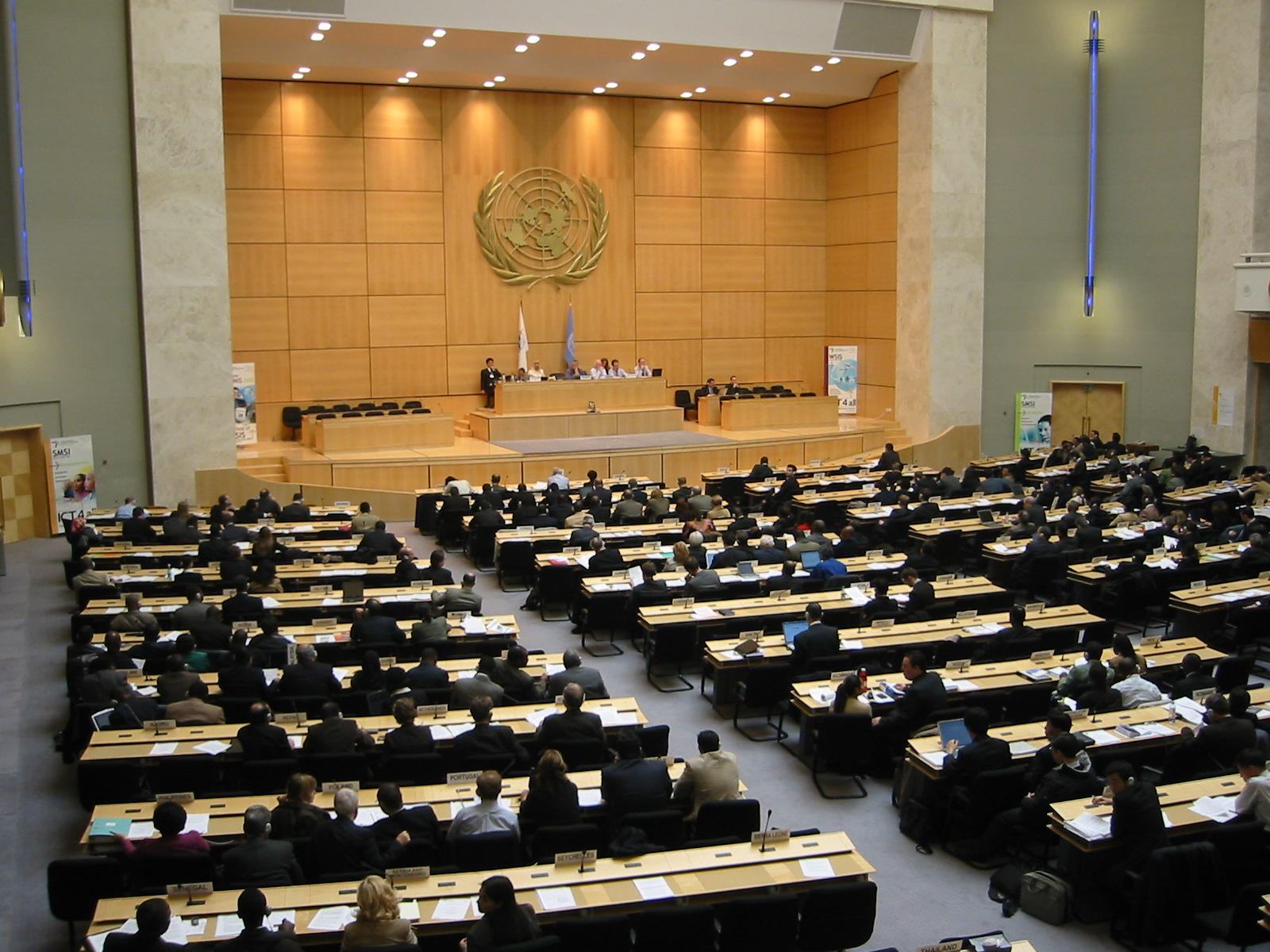
The assembly hall of the Palais des nations

Geneva is the European headquarters of the United Nations, in the Palace of Nations building, up the hill from the headquarters of the former League of Nations. Several agencies are headquartered in Geneva, including the United Nations High Commissioner for Refugees, the UN Office of the High Commissioner for Human Rights, the World Health Organization, the International Labour Organization, International Telecommunication Union, the International Baccalaureate Organization, the World Meteorological Organization, and the World Intellectual Property Organization.

Apart from the UN agencies, Geneva hosts many inter-governmental organisations, such as the World Trade Organization, the South Centre, the World Economic Forum, the International Organization for Migration, the International Federation of Red Cross and Red Crescent Societies and the International Committee of the Red Cross.

The Maison de la Paix building hosts the three Geneva centres supported by the Swiss Confederation: the International Centre for Humanitarian Demining, the Centre for the Democratic Control of Armed Forces and the Geneva Centre for Security Policy, as well as other organisations active in the field of peace, international affairs and sustainable development.

Organisations on the European level include the European Broadcasting Union (EBU) and CERN (the European Organization for Nuclear Research) which is the world's largest particle physics laboratory.

The Geneva Environment Network (GEN) publishes the Geneva Green Guide, an extensive listing of Geneva-based global organisations working on environmental protection and sustainable development. A website, jointly run by the Swiss Government, the World Business Council for Sustainable Development, the United Nations Environment Programme and the International Union for Conservation of Nature, includes accounts of how NGOs, business, government and the UN cooperate. By doing so, it attempts to explain why Geneva has been picked by so many NGOs and UN bodies as their headquarters' location.

The World Organization of the Scout Movement and the World Scout Bureau Central Office are headquartered in Geneva.

== Notable people ==
=== A–C ===
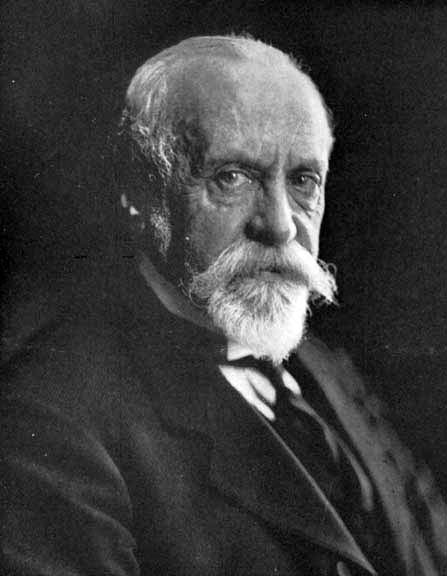
Gustave Ador

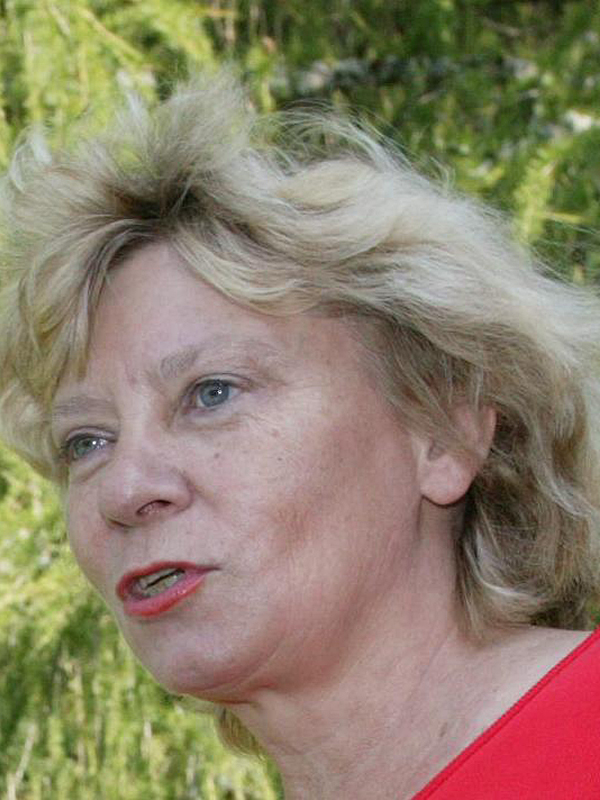
Christiane Brunner

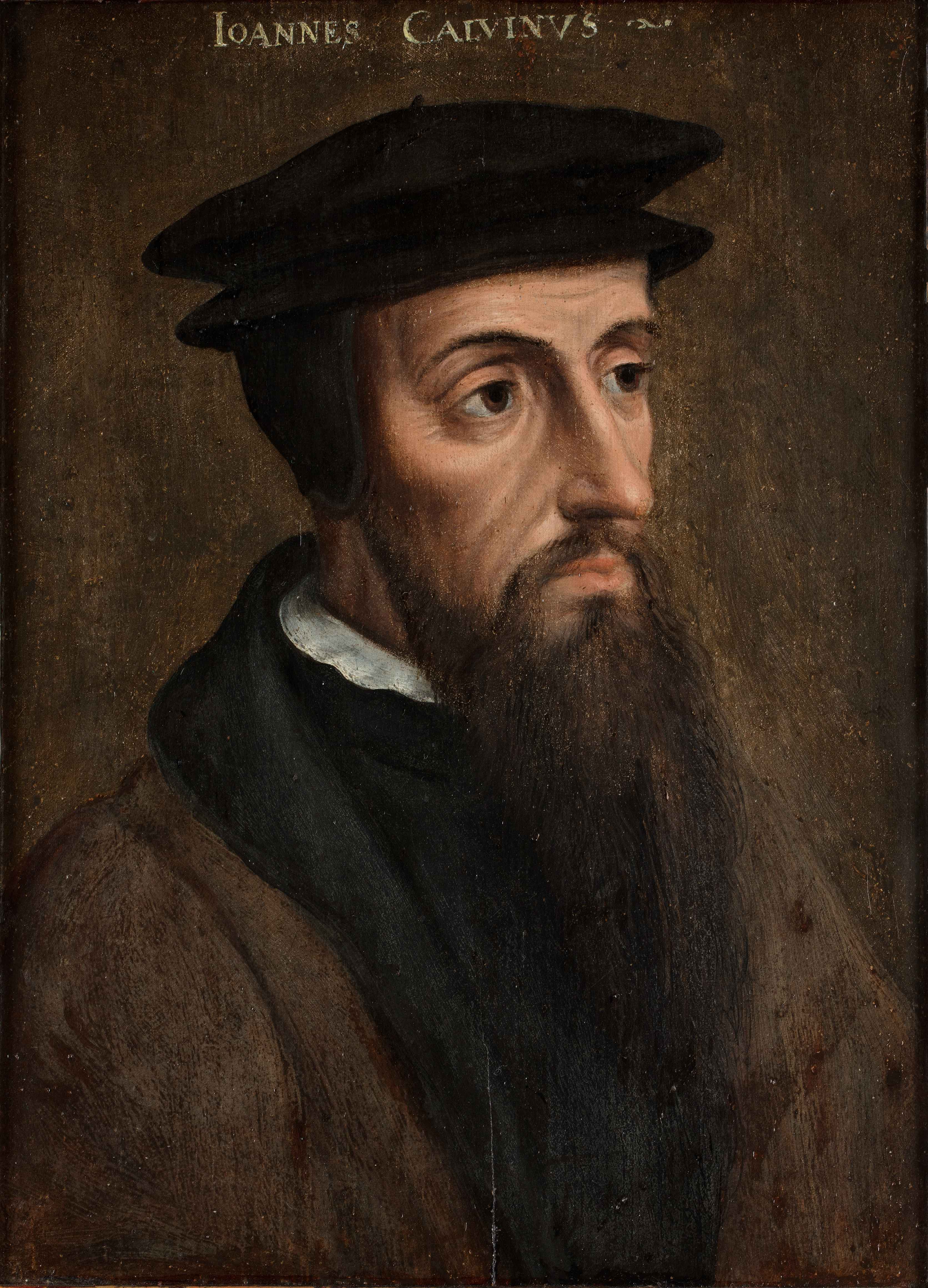
John Calvin, c. 1550

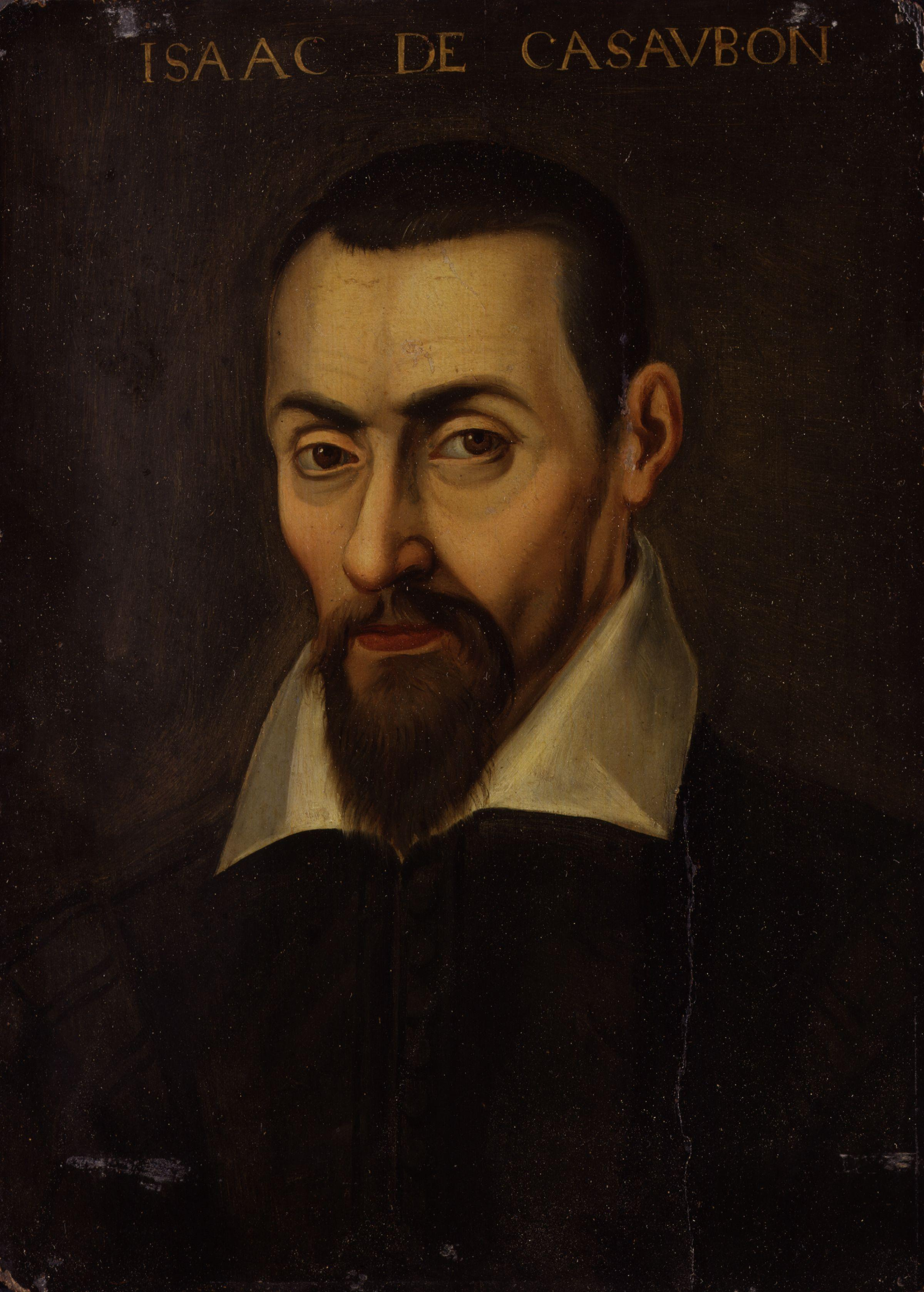
Isaac Casaubon

- Alfredo Aceto (born 1991), visual artist
- Gustave Ador (1845–1928), statesman, President of the Red Cross (ICRC)
- David Aebischer (born 1978), ice hockey goaltender, 2001 Stanley Cup champion
- Jacques-Laurent Agasse (1767–1849), animal and landscape painter
- Jeff Agoos (born 1968), retired American soccer defender, 134 caps for the US team
- Henri-Frédéric Amiel (1821–1881), moral philosopher, poet and critic
- Gustave Amoudruz (1885–1963), sports shooter, bronze medallist at the 1920 Summer Olympics
- Adolphe Appia (1862–1928), architect and theorist of stage lighting and décor.
- Ecaterina Arbore (1873–1937), Romanian communist and feminist, People's Commissar for Health of the Moldavian ASSR between 1924 and 1929.
- Philip Arditti (born c. 1980), British/Jewish Sephardic theatre and television actor
- Aimé Argand (1750–1803), physicist and chemist, invented the Argand lamp
- Jean-Robert Argand (1768–1822), amateur mathematician, published the Argand diagram
- Martha Argerich (born 1941), Argentine classical concert pianist
- John Armleder (born 1948), performance artist, painter, sculptor, critic and curator
- Germaine Aussey (1909–1979), née Agassiz, an actress of Swiss origin who settled in Geneva in 1960
- Alexandre Bardinon (born 2002), racing driver
- Pierre Bardinon (1931–2012), businessman and car collector
- Jean-Pierre Berenger (1737–1807), editor, writer and historian
- Mathias Beche (born 1986), racing driver
- Jean-Luc Bideau (born 1940), film actor
- Celia von Bismarck (1971–2010), humanitarian and ambassador of the Swiss Red Cross
- Ernest Bloch (1880–1959), US composer of Swiss origin
- Roger Bocquet (1921–1994), footballer who won 48 caps for Switzerland
- Raoul Marie Joseph Count de Boigne (1862–1949), a French sports shooter, bronze medallist at the 1908 Summer Olympics
- Caroline Boissier-Butini (1786–1836), pianist and composer
- François Bonivard (1493–1570), Geneva ecclesiastic, historian and libertine
- Charles Bonnet (1720–1793), naturalist and philosophical writer
- Jorge Luis Borges (1899–1986), Argentine short-story writer, studied at the Collège de Genève
- Marc-Théodore Bourrit (1739–1819), traveller and writer
- Nicolas Bouvier (1929–1998), writer and photographer
- Clotilde Bressler-Gianoli (1875–1912), an Italian opera singer
- Christiane Brunner (1947-2025), politician, lawyer and trade union champion
- Mickaël Buffaz (born 1979), French cyclist
- Jean-Jacques Burlamaqui (1694–1748), Genevan legal and political theorist
- Cécile Butticaz (1884–1966), engineer
- Kate Burton (born 1957), actress, the daughter of actor Richard Burton
- John Calvin (1509–1564), influential theologian, reformer
- Augustin Pyramus de Candolle (1778–1841), botanist, worked on plant classification
- Clint Capela (born 1994), professional basketball player
- Jean de Carro (1770–1857), Vienna-based physician, promoted vaccination against smallpox
- Isaac Casaubon (1559–1614), a classical scholar and philologist
- Méric Casaubon (1599–1671), son of Isaac Casaubon, a French-English classical scholar
- Mike Castro de Maria (born 1972), electronic music composer
- Jean-Jacques Challet-Venel (1811–1893), politician, on the Swiss Federal Council 1864–1872
- Alfred Edward Chalon RA (1780–1860), portrait painter
- John James Chalon RA (1778–1854), painter of landscapes, marine scenes and animal life
- Marguerite Champendal (1870–1928), first Genevan to have obtained her doctorate in medicine at the University of Geneva (1900)
- Henri Christiné (1867–1941), French composer of sparkling, witty, jazzy musical plays
- Victor Cherbuliez (1829–1899), novelist and author
- Étienne Clavière (1735–1793), banker and politician of the French revolution
- Paulo Coelho (born 1947), Brazilian lyricist and novelist, author of The Alchemist, residing in Geneva
- Renée Colliard (1933–2022), former alpine skier, gold medallist at the 1956 Winter Olympics
- Gabriel Cramer (1704–1752), Genevan mathematician

=== D–G ===
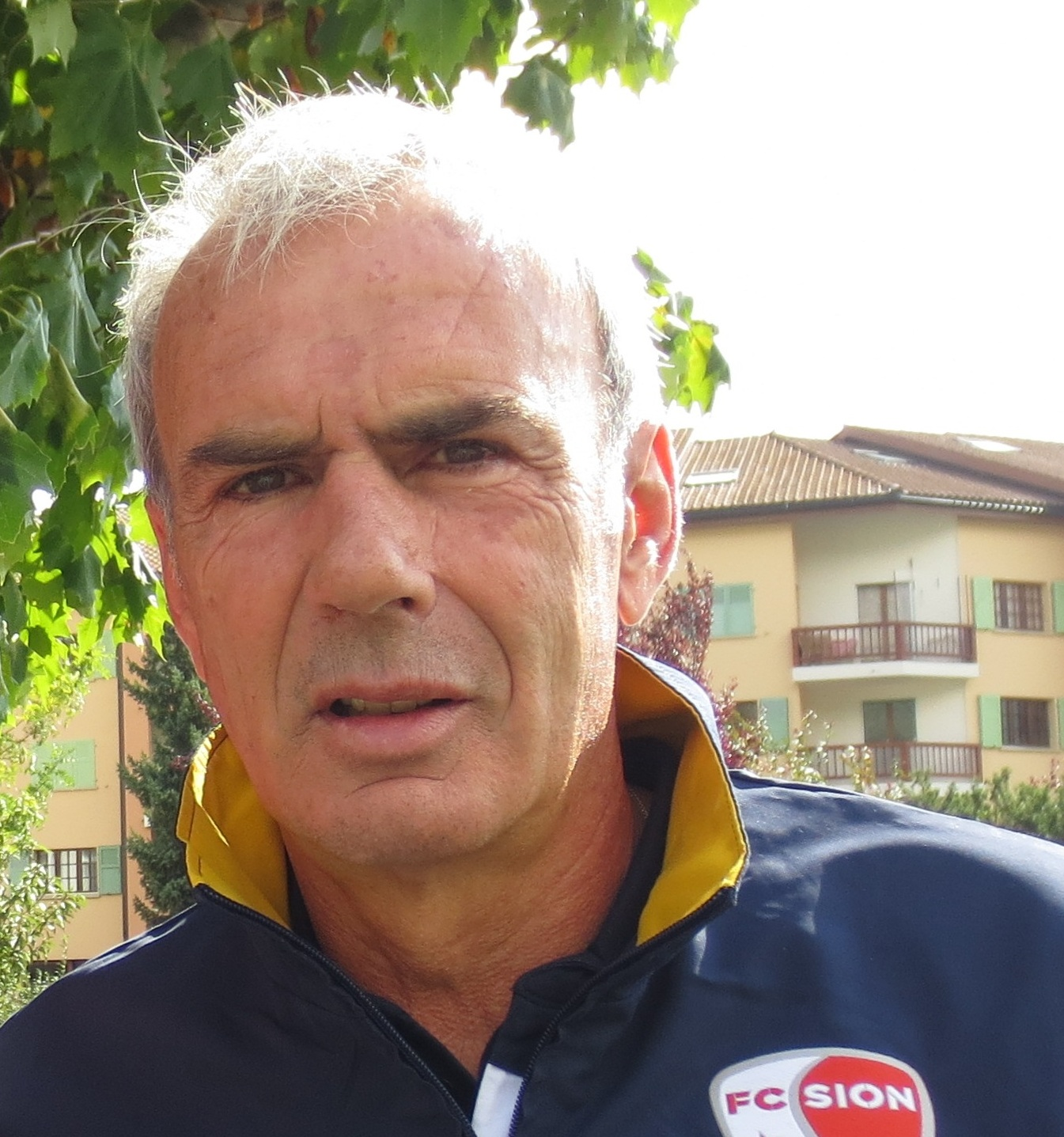
Michel Decastel, 2012

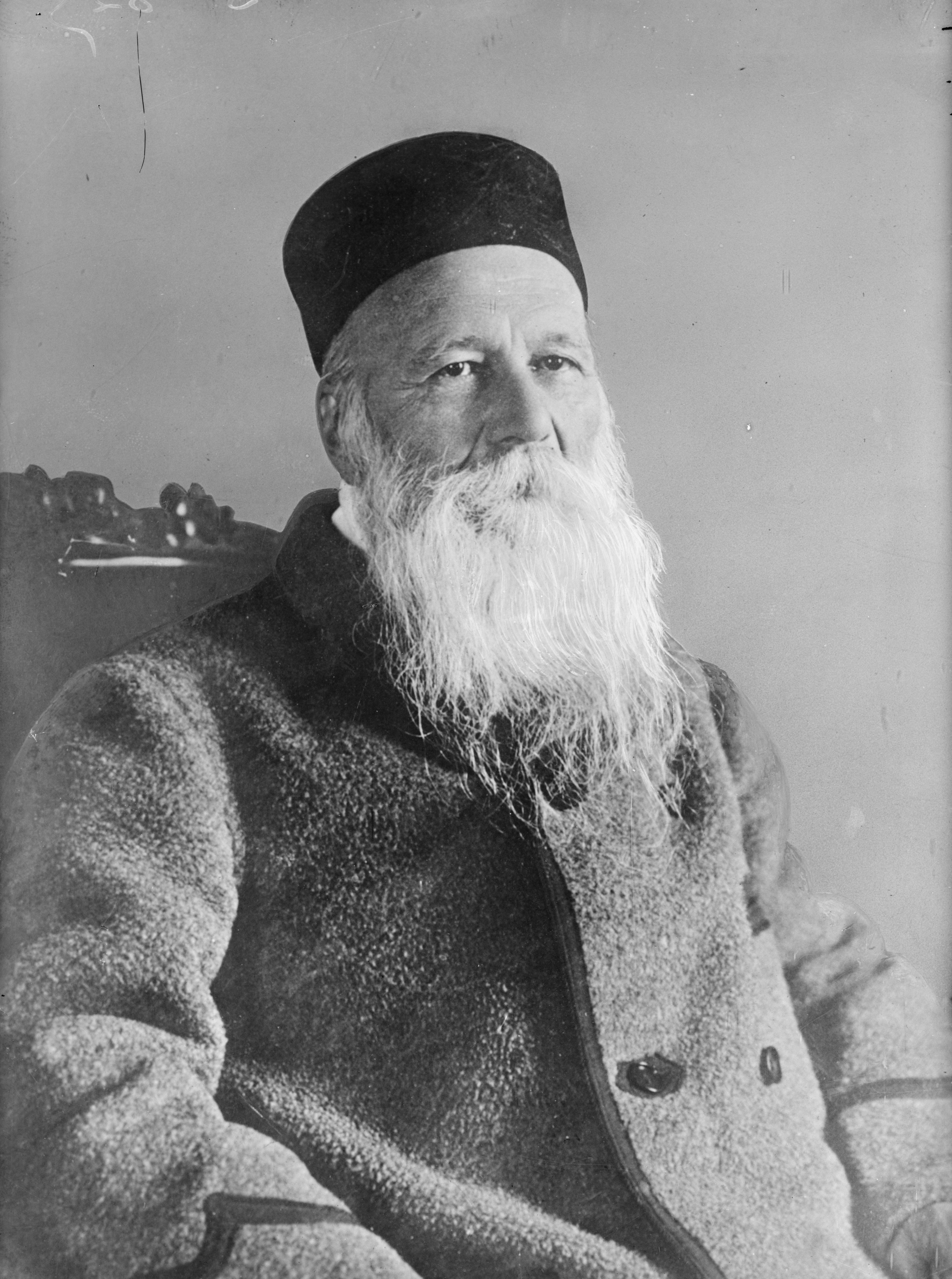
Jean Henri Dunant, 1901

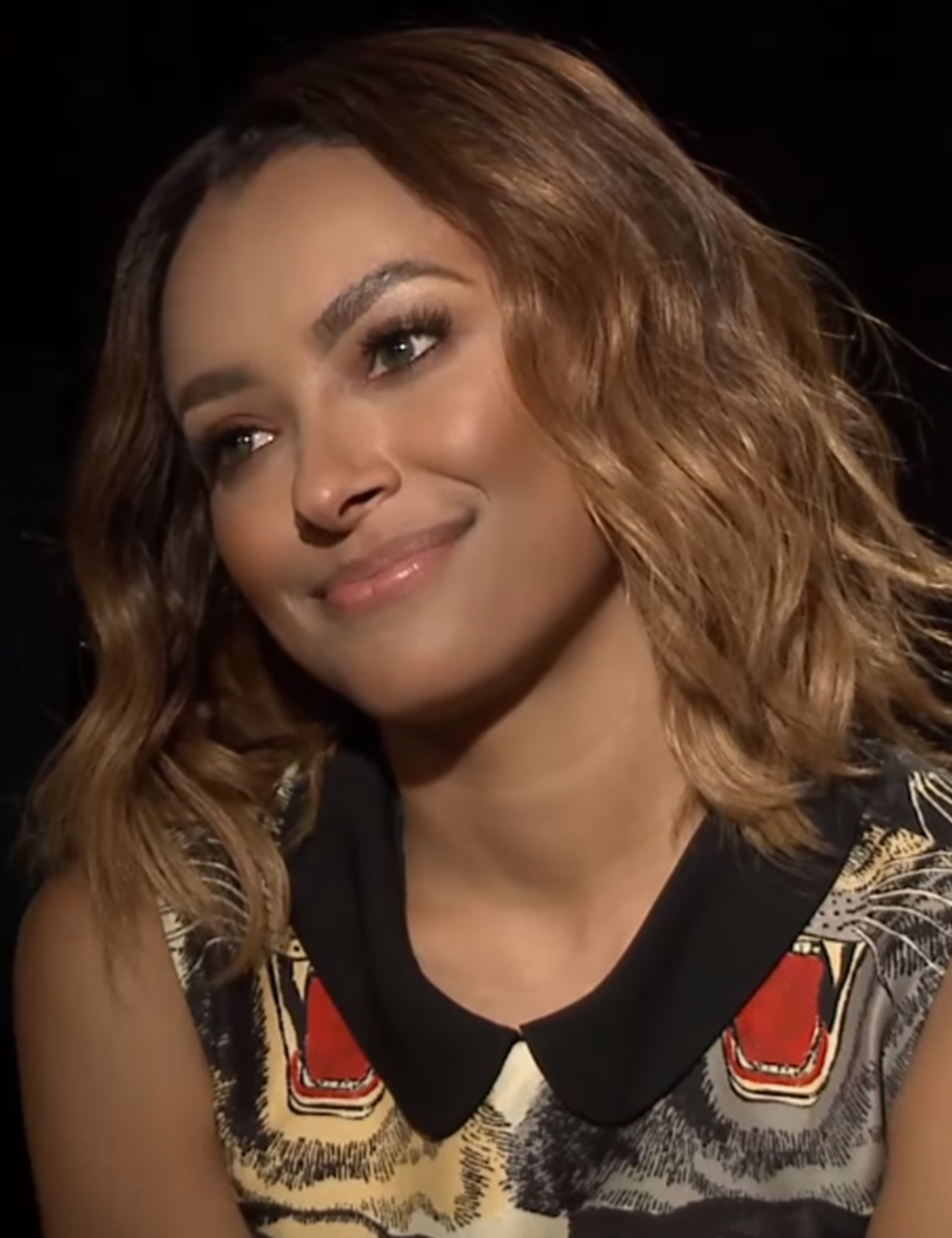
Kat Graham, 2017

- Maryam d'Abo (born 1960), English film and TV actress and Bond girl
- Jacques-Antoine Dassier (1715–1759), a Genevan medallist, active in London
- Michel Decastel (born 1955), football manager and midfielder, 314 club caps, 19 for Switzerland
- Jean-Denis Delétraz (born 1963), racing driver
- Louis Delétraz (born 1997), racing driver
- Jean-Louis de Lolme (1740–1806), lawyer and constitutional writer
- Jean-André Deluc (1727–1817), geologist, natural philosopher and meteorologist
- Joël Dicker (born 1985), author and novelist
- Giovanni Diodati (1576–1649), Italian Calvinist theologian and Bible translator
- Élie Ducommun (1833–1906), peace activist, 1902 Nobel Peace Prize winner
- Armand Dufaux (1833–1941), aviation pioneer, flew the length of Lake Geneva in 1910
- Henri Dufaux (1879–1980), French-Swiss aviation pioneer, inventor, painter and politician
- Pierre Étienne Louis Dumont (1759–1829), Genevan political writer
- Henry Dunant (1828–1910), founded the Red Cross, first recipient of Nobel Peace Prize in 1901
- Emmanuel-Étienne Duvillard (1775–1832), Swiss economist
- Isabelle Eberhardt (1877–1904), Russian-Swiss explorer and travel writer
- Empress Elisabeth of Austria (1837–1898), Empress of Austria and Queen of Hungary
- Emanuele Filiberto of Savoy, Prince of Venice (born 1972), a member of the House of Savoy
- Louis Favre (1826–1879), engineer, responsible for the construction of the Gotthard Tunnel
- Philippe Favre (1961–2013), racing driver
- Henri Fazy (1842–1920), politician and historian
- Edmond Fleg, born Flegenheimer (1874–1963), a Swiss-French writer, thinker, novelist, essayist and playwright
- Ian Fleming (1908–1964), author (James Bond), studied psychology briefly in Geneva in 1931
- Sylvie Fleury (born 1961), a contemporary object artist of installation art and mixed media
- Sir Augustus Wollaston Franks KCB FRS FSA (1826–1897), English antiquary and museum administrator
- Pierre-Victor Galland (1822–1892), painter
- Albert Gallatin (1761–1849), an American politician of Genevan origin, diplomat, ethnologist and linguist
- Agénor de Gasparin (1810–1871), French statesman and author, also researched table-turning
- Valérie de Gasparin (1813–1894), woman of letters, regards freedom, equality and creativity
- François Gaussen (1790–1863), Protestant divine
- Victor Gautier (1824–1890), Swiss physician
- Marcel Golay (1927–2015), astronomer
- Claude Goretta (1929–2019), film director and television producer
- Emilie Gourd (1879–1946), journalist and activist for Women's suffrage in Switzerland
- Isabelle Graesslé (born 1959), theologian, feminist and former museum director, moderator of ministers and deacons at the Protestant Church of Geneva
- Kat Graham (born 1989), actress, singer, and model, she plays Bonnie Bennett in The Vampire Diaries
- Cédric Grand (born 1976), bobsledder, competed in four Winter Olympics, bronze medallist at the 2006 Winter Olympics
- Romain Grosjean (born 1986), former Formula 1 racing driver, currently racing for Andretti Autosport in the IndyCar Series. He is mainly known for his massive crash at the 2020 Bahrain Grand Prix.

=== H–M ===
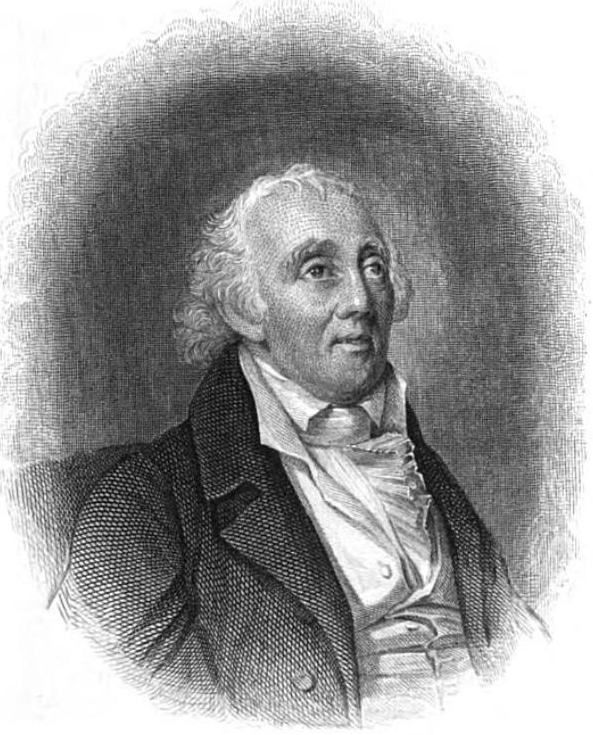
Francois Huber

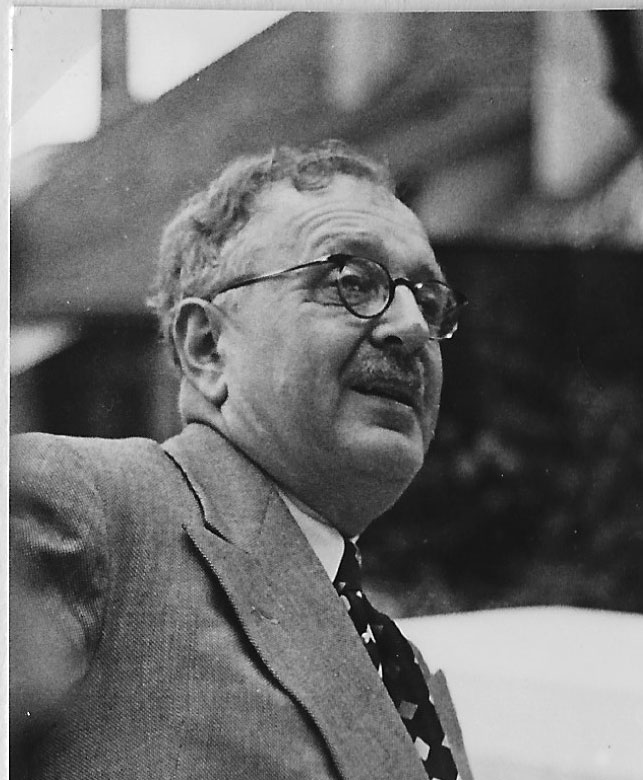
Paul Lachenal, 1939

Lenin in Switzerland, 1916

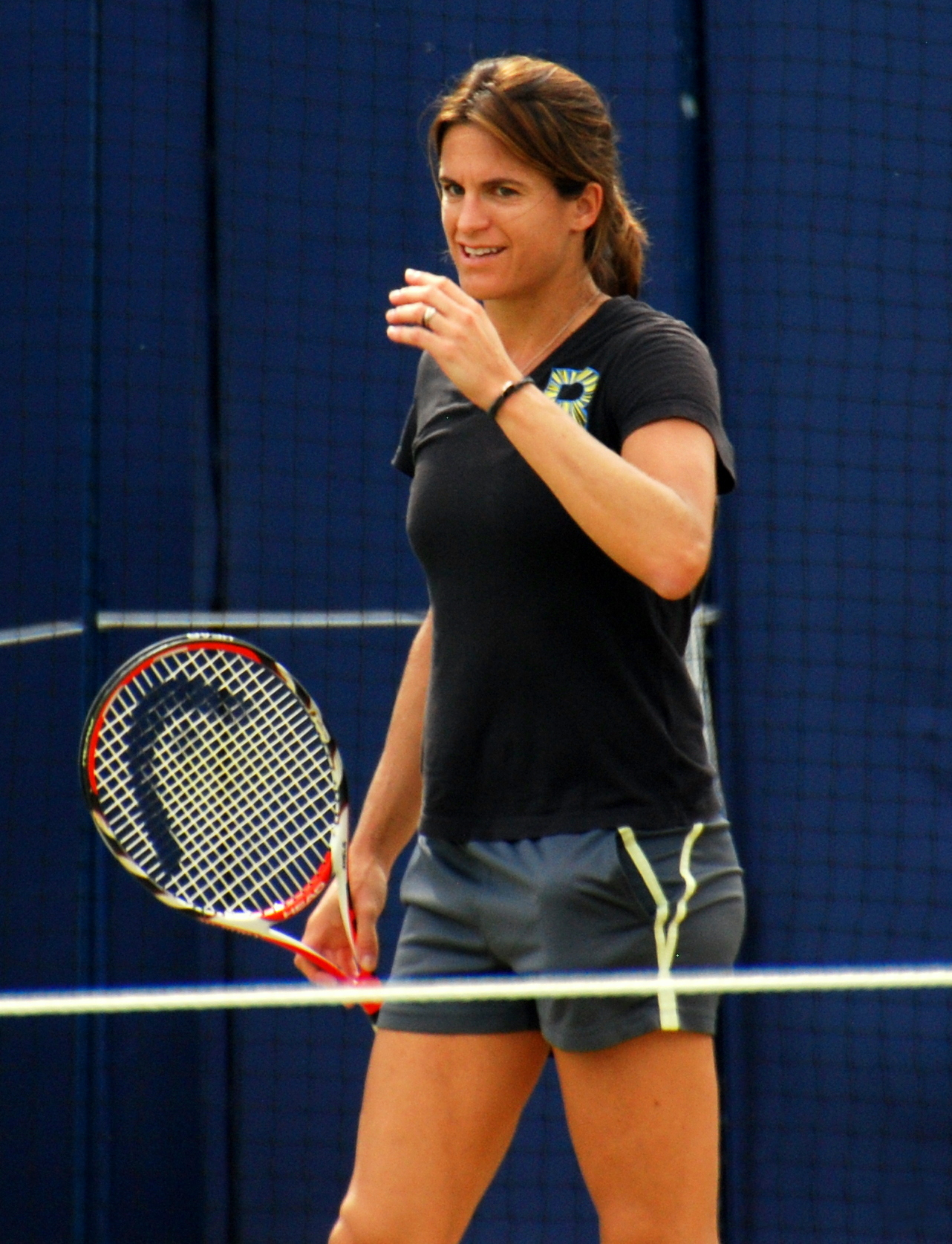
Amelie Mauresmo, 2014

- Admiral of the Fleet Lord John Hay GCB (1827–1916), Royal Navy officer and politician
- Abraham Hermanjat (1862–1932), painter who worked in the Fauvist and Divisionist styles
- Germain Henri Hess (1802–1850), Swiss-Russian chemist and doctor, formulated Hess's law
- Gary Hirsch (born 1987), racing driver
- Hector Hodler (1887–1920), Esperantist
- Fulk Greville Howard (1773–1846), English politician
- Jean Huber (1721–1786), painter, silhouettiste, soldier and author
- François Huber (1750–1831), naturalist, studied the respiration of bees
- Marie Huber (1695–1753), translator, editor and author of theological works
- Pierre Jeanneret (1896–1967), architect, collaborated with his cousin Le Corbusier
- Thomas Jouannet (born 1970), actor
- Charles Journet (1891–1975), cardinal of the Roman Catholic Church
- Louis Jurine (1751–1819), physician, surgeon, naturalist and entomologist
- Sonia Kacem (born 1985), Swiss-born visual artist
- Michael Krausz (1942–2025), American philosopher, an artist and orchestral conductor
- Adrien Lachenal (1849–1918), politician, Federal Council of Switzerland 1892–1899
- François Lachenal (1918–1997), publisher and diplomat
- Paul Lachenal (1884–1955), politician, co-founded Orchestre de la Suisse Romande
- Marie Laforêt (1939–2019), French singer and actress
- Sarah Lahbati (born 1993), actress and singer
- François Le Fort (1656–1699), first Russian Admiral
- Georges-Louis Le Sage (1724–1803), physicist, Le Sage's theory of gravitation
- Jean Leclerc (1657–1736), theologian and biblical scholar, promoted exegesis
- Henri Leconte (born 1963), former French professional tennis player, men's singles finalist, French Open 1988
- Philippe Le Royer (1816–1897), French and Swiss politician and lawyer, served France as the Minister of Justice and President of the Senate
- Vladimir Lenin (1870–1924), lived in Geneva 1902–1905 as an exile from the Russian Empire
- Jean-Étienne Liotard (1702–1789), painter, art connoisseur and dealer
- Corinne Maier (born 1963), psychoanalyst, economist, and best-selling writer
- Ella Maillart (1903–1997), adventurer, travel writer and photographer, as well as a sportswoman
- Solomon Caesar Malan (1812–1894), oriental linguist and biblical scholar
- Jacques Mallet du Pan (1749–1800), Genevan-French royalist journalist
- Alexander Marcet FRS (1770–1822), physician who became a British citizen in 1800
- Jane Marcet (1769–1858), innovative writer of popular introductory science books
- Sebastian Marka (born 1978), German film director and editor
- Frank Martin (1890–1974), composer, editor of The Statesman's Year Book
- Nicolas Maulini (born 1981), racing driver
- Théodore Maunoir (1806–1869), co-founder of the International Committee of the Red Cross
- Amélie Mauresmo (born 1979), former professional tennis player and former world No.1
- Barthélemy Menn (1815–1893), landscape painter, introduced painting en plein air
- Alain Menu (born 1963), racing driver
- Heinrich Menu von Minutoli (1772–1846), Prussian Generalmajor, explorer and archaeologist
- Nancy Mérienne (1793–1860), Swiss painter
- Roman Mityukov (born 2000), Swiss 2020 Olympic swimmer
- Jacques-Barthélemy Micheli du Crest (1690–1766), military engineer, physicist and cartographer
- Giorgio Mondini (born 1980), racing driver
- Stephanie Morgenstern (born 1965), Canadian actress, filmmaker and screenwriter
- Edoardo Mortara (born 1987), Swiss-Italian racing driver
- Thierry Moutinho (born 1991), Swiss-Portuguese footballer
- Gustave Moynier (1826–1910), lawyer and co-founder of the Red Cross

=== N–R ===
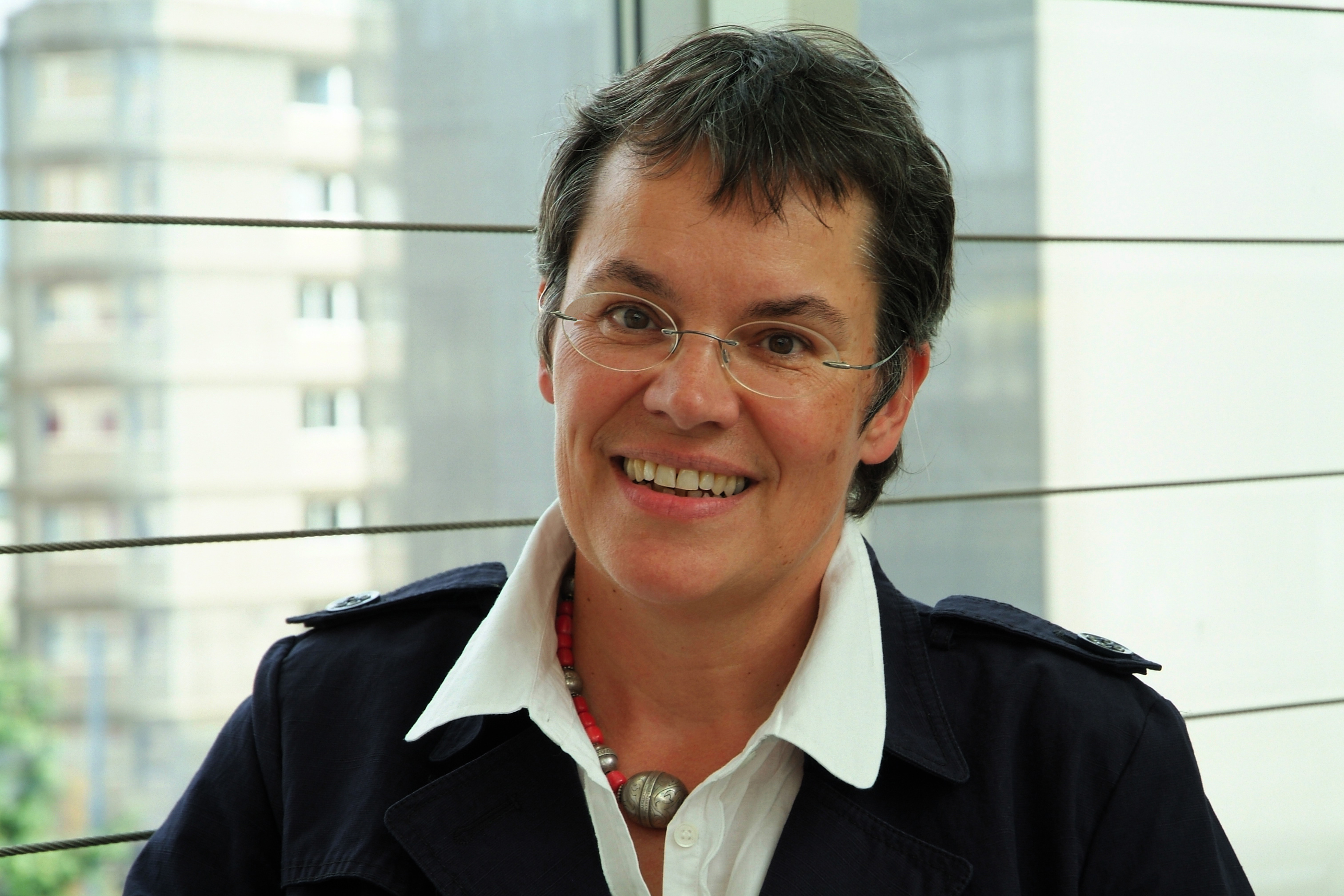
Liliane Maury Pasquier, 2007

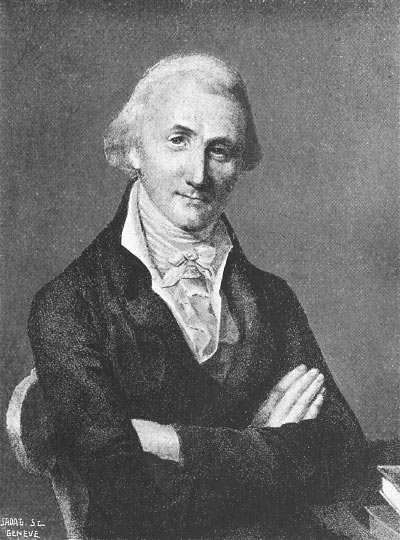
Pierre Prévost

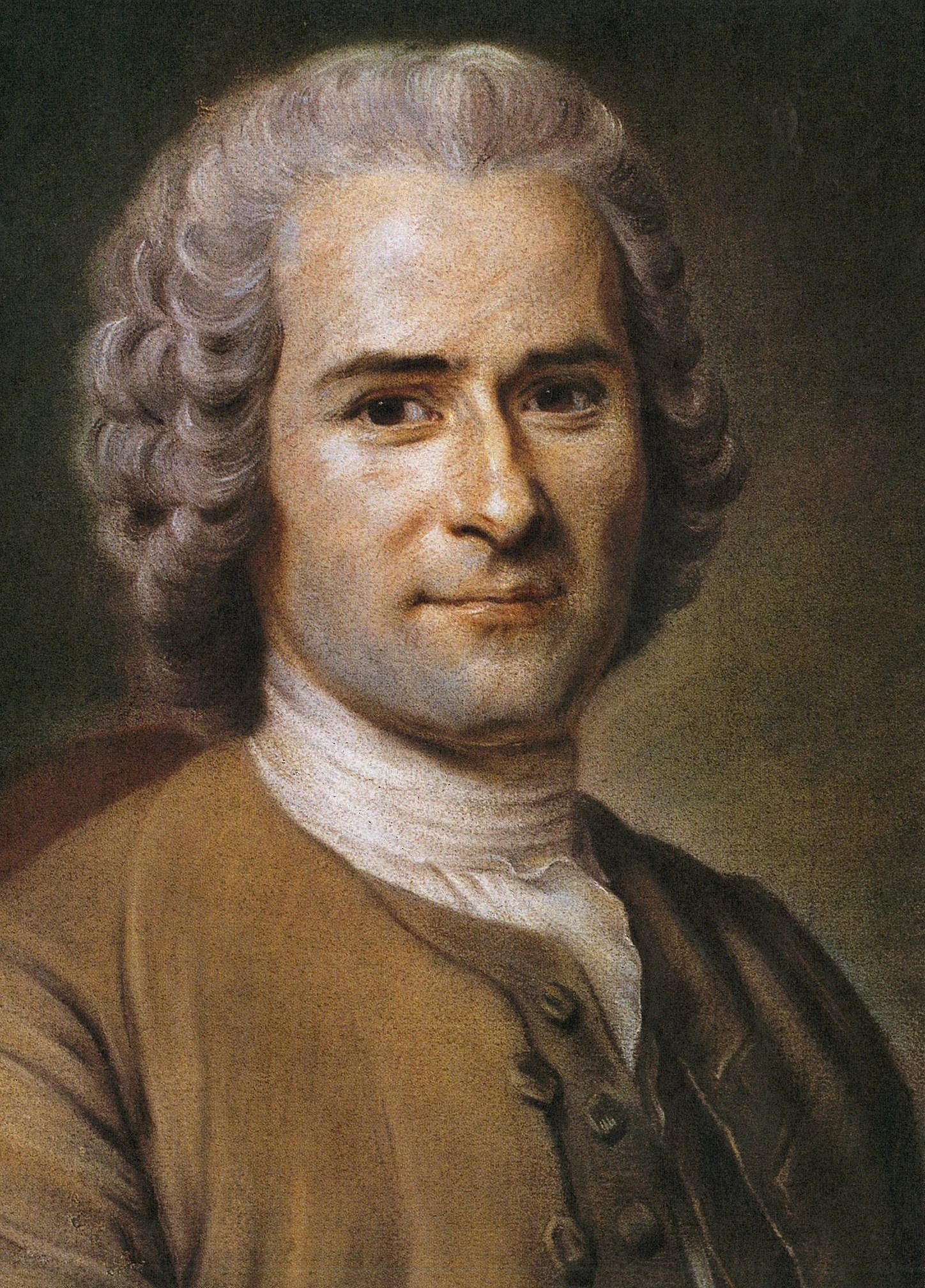
Jean-Jacques Rousseau

- Jacques Necker (1732–1804), banker and finance minister for Louis XVI
- Louis Albert Necker (1786–1861), crystallographer and geographer, devised the Necker cube
- Felix Neff (1798–1829), Protestant divine and philanthropist
- Alfred Newton FRS HFRSE (1829–1907), English zoologist and ornithologist
- Karim Ojjeh (born 1965), Saudi Arabian businessman and racing driver
- Julie Ordon (born 1984), model and actress
- Rémy Pagani (born 1954), politician, Mayor of Geneva 2009/10 and 2012/13
- Liliane Maury Pasquier (born 1956), politician
- PATjE (born 1970), birth name Patrice Jauffret, singer-songwriter, and musician
- Faule Petitot (1572–1629), sculptor, cabinetmaker and architect, citizen of Geneva since 1615
- Jean Petitot (1607–1691), enamel painter, son of Faule
- Carmen Perrin (born 1953), Bolivian-born Swiss visual artist, designer, and educator
- Jean Piaget (1896–1980), clinical psychologist, devised genetic epistemology
- Robert Pinget (1919–1997), avant-garde French modernist nouveau roman writer
- George Pitt, 1st Baron Rivers (1721–1803), English diplomat and politician
- Barbara Polla (born 1950), medical doctor, gallery owner, art curator and writer
- James Pradier (1790–1852), Genevan and then Swiss sculptor, neoclassical style
- Jean-Louis Prévost (1838–1927), neurologist and physiologist
- Pierre Prévost (1751–1839), philosopher, physicist wrote the law of exchange in radiation
- Tariq Ramadan (born 1962), Swiss Muslim academic, philosopher and writer
- Marcel Raymond (1897–1981), literary critic of French literature of the "Geneva School"
- Flore Revalles (1889–1966), singer, dancer and actress
- Charles Pierre Henri Rieu (1820–1902), Orientalist and Professor of Arabic
- Auguste Arthur de la Rive (1801–1873), physicist, worked on the heat of gases
- Charles-Gaspard de la Rive (1770–1834), physicist, psychiatrist and politician
- François Jules Pictet de la Rive (1809–1872), zoologist and palaeontologist
- Andree Aeschlimann Rochat (1900–1990), composer and music critic
- Suzanne Rohr (born 1939), watch enameller
- Tibor Rosenbaum (1923–1980), rabbi and businessman
- Marc Rosset (born 1970), former pro tennis player, gold medallist at the 1992 Olympic Games
- Jean-Jacques Rousseau (1712–1778), writer and philosopher
- Jean Rousset (1910–2002), literary critic and early structuralism writer of the Geneva School
- Xavier Ruiz (born 1970), film producer and director

=== S–Z ===
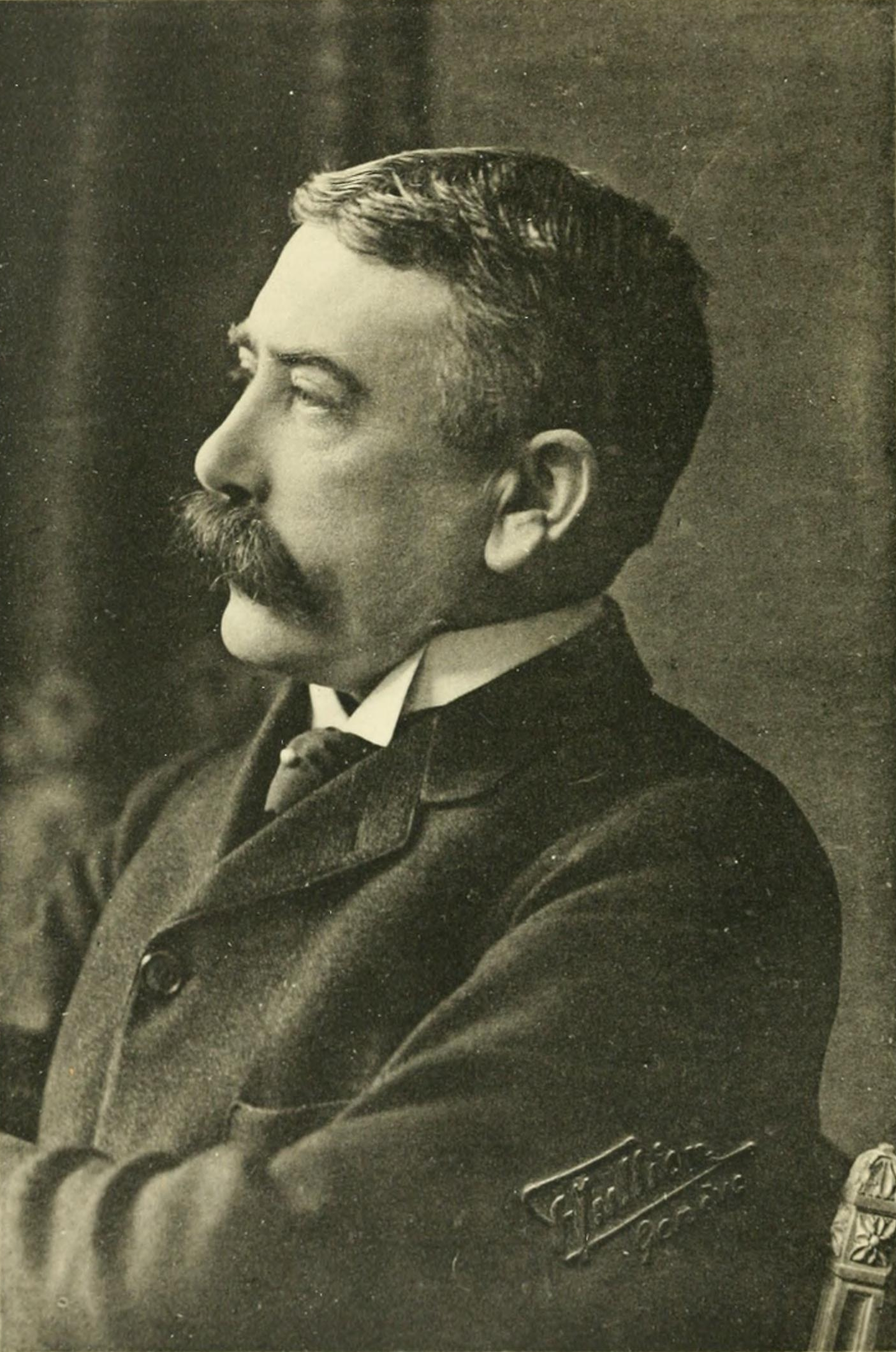
Ferdinand de Saussure

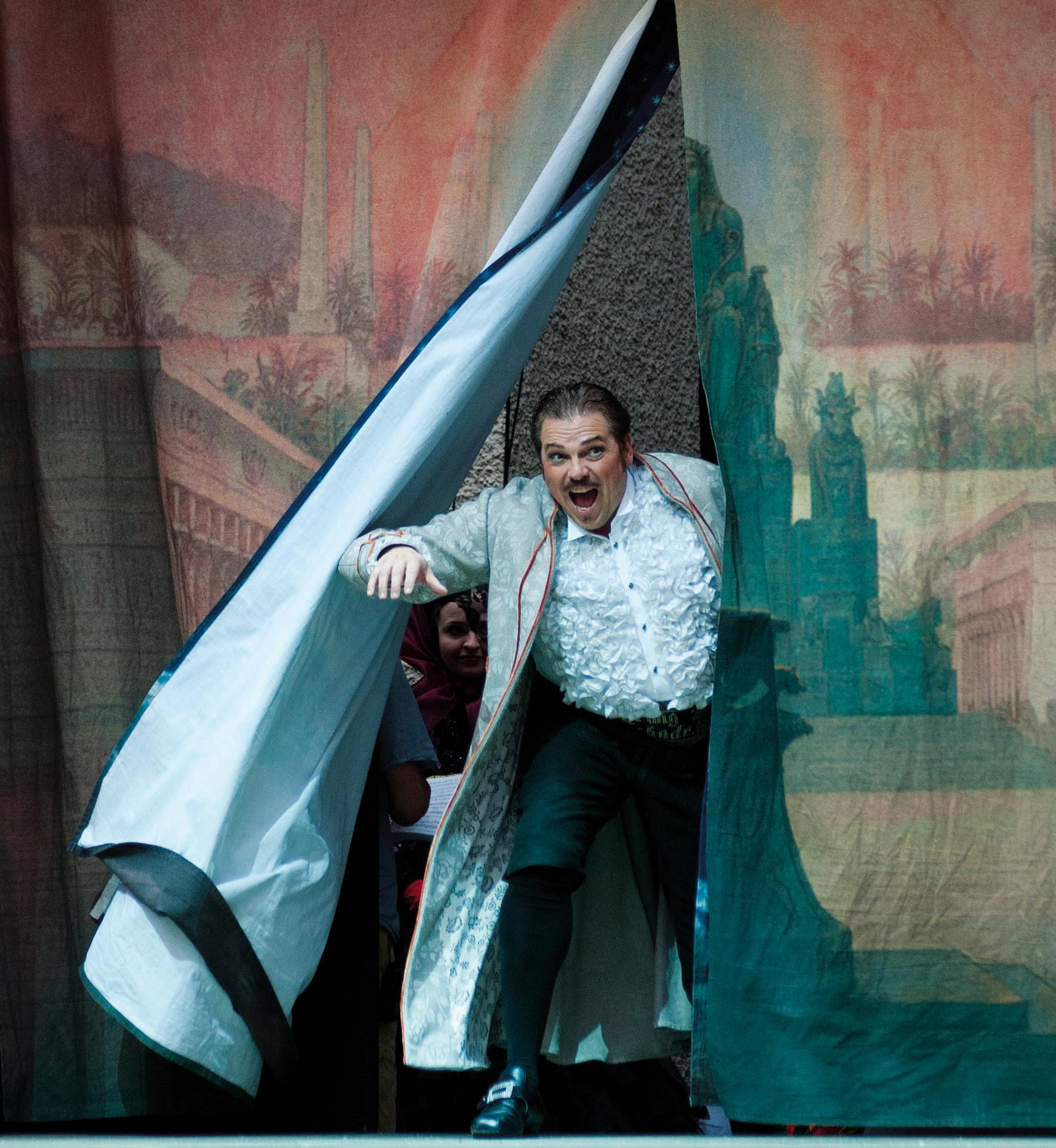
Michael Schade, 2012

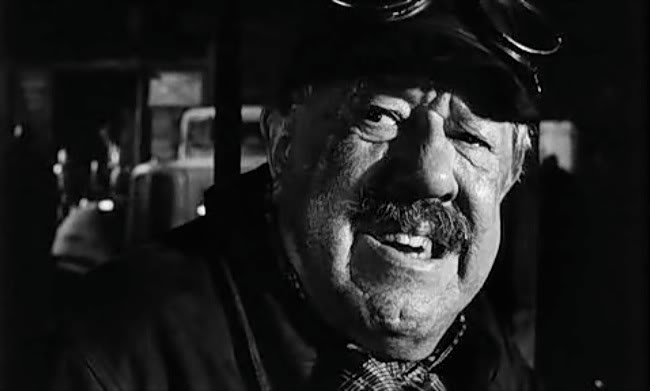
Michel Simon, 1964

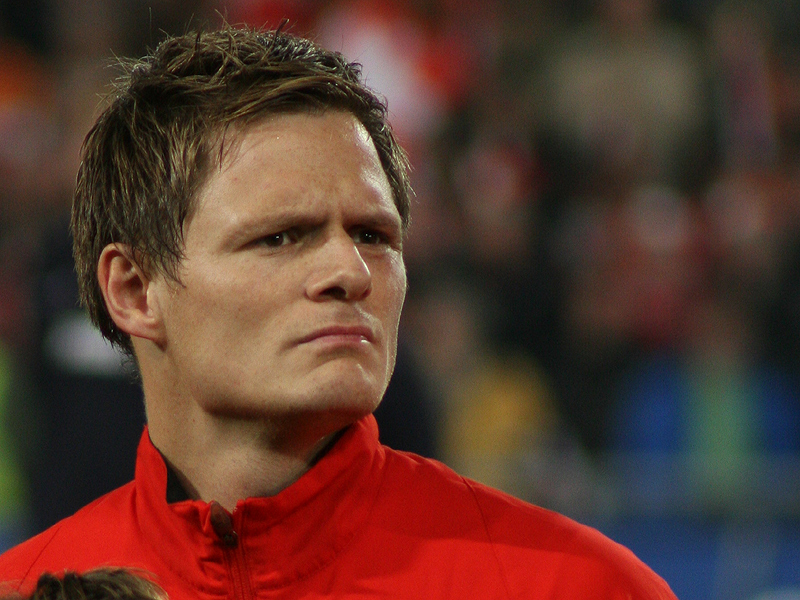
Johann Vogel, 2006

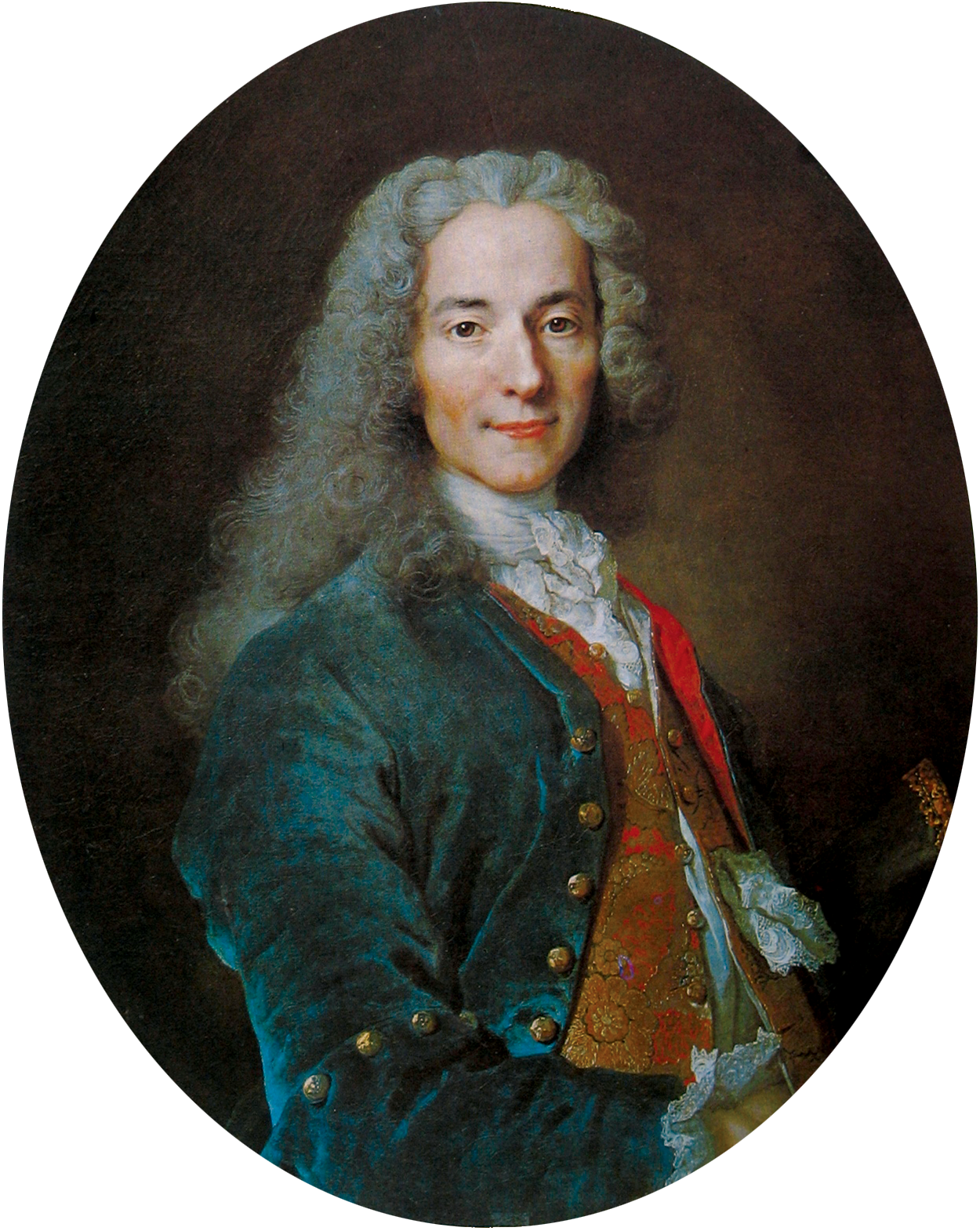
Voltaire

- Ferdinand de Saussure (1857–1913), linguist and semiotician
- Horace Bénédict de Saussure (1740–1799), geologist, meteorologist, physicist, and Alpine explorer
- Nicolas-Théodore de Saussure (1767–1845), chemist, studied plant physiology, advanced phytochemistry
- Léon Savary (1895–1968), writer and journalist
- Michael Schade (born 1965), Canadian operatic tenor
- Johann Jacob Schweppe (1740–1821), watchmaker developed Schweppes bottled carbonated water
- Marguerite Sechehaye (1887–1965), psychotherapist, treated people with schizophrenia
- Louis Segond (1810–1885), theologian and translator, pastor in Chêne-Bougeries
- Philippe Senderos (born 1985), footballer, over 200 club caps and 57 for Switzerland
- Jean Senebier (1742–1809), pastor and voluminous writer on vegetable physiology
- Liberato Firmino Sifonia (1917–1996), Italian composer
- Pierre Eugene du Simitiere (1737–1784), naturalist, American patriot and portrait painter.
- Michel Simon (1895–1975), actor
- Jean Charles Léonard de Sismondi (1773–1842), historian and political economist
- Edward Snowden (born 1983), lived in Geneva between 2007 and 2009, while working for the CIA
- Pierre Soubeyran (1706–1775), engraver, etcher and Encyclopédiste
- Terry Southern (1924–1995), American author, essayist and screenwriter; lived in Geneva 1956–59
- Ezekiel Spanheim (1629–1710), Prussian diplomat
- Friedrich Spanheim (1632–1701), Calvinistic theology professor at the University of Leiden
- George Steiner (1929–2020), Franco-American essayist, taught comparative literature at the University of Geneva (1974–94)
- Jacques Charles François Sturm (1803–1855), French mathematician
- Émile Taddéoli (1879–1920), Swiss aviation pioneer
- Alain Tanner (1929–2022), film director
- Sigismund Thalberg (1812–1871), Austrian composer and pianist
- Max Thurian (1921–1996), theologian, known as Frère Max
- Pierre Tirard (1827–1893), French politician
- Rodolphe Töpffer (1799–1846), teacher, author, painter, cartoonist and caricaturist
- Wolfgang-Adam Töpffer (1766–1847), painter of landscapes and watercolors
- Vico Torriani (1920–1998), singer, actor, show host
- Georges Trombert (1874–1949), French fencer, silver and bronze medallist at the 1920 Summer Olympics
- Théodore Tronchin (1709–1781), Genevan physician
- François Turrettini (1623–1687), Genevan-Italian Reformed scholastic theologian
- Jean Alphonse Turrettini (1671–1737), reformed theologian
- Princess Vittoria of Savoy (2003), heir to the Italian throne
- François Vivares (1709–1780), French landscape-engraver, active in England
- Johann Vogel (born 1977), former footballer, played 94 games for Switzerland
- Bailey Voisin (born 2003), British racing driver
- Callum Voisin (born 2006), British racing driver
- Prince Andrei Volkonsky (1933–2008), Russian composer of classical music and harpsichordist
- Voltaire (1694–1778), French philosopher, historian, dramatist and man of letters; lived at Les Délices 1755–1760
- Nedd Willard (1926–2018), writer
- R. Norris Williams (1891–1968), American tennis player and RMS Titanic survivor
- Pierre Wissmer (1915–1992), Swiss-French composer, pianist and music teacher
- Jean Ziegler (born 1934), politician and sociologist
- Reto Ziegler (born 1986), footballer, has played 35 games for Switzerland

== See also ==
- Outline of Geneva
- Bibliothèque Publique et Universitaire (Geneva)
- Boule de Genève
- Calvin Auditory, a chapel that played a significant role in the Reformation
- Circuit des Nations, the historic racetrack
- Franco-Provençal language
- Geneva Freeport
- Geneva Summit for Human Rights and Democracy
- History of Savoy in the Middle Ages

== Bibliography ==
- "Geneva (municipality)" in German, French and Italian in the online Historical Dictionary of Switzerland.
- Joëlle Kuntz, Geneva and the call of internationalism. A history, éditions Zoé, 2011, 96 pages (ISBN 978-2-88182-855-3).
