= Georges-Louis Le Sage =

Genevan physicist and inventor (1724–1803)

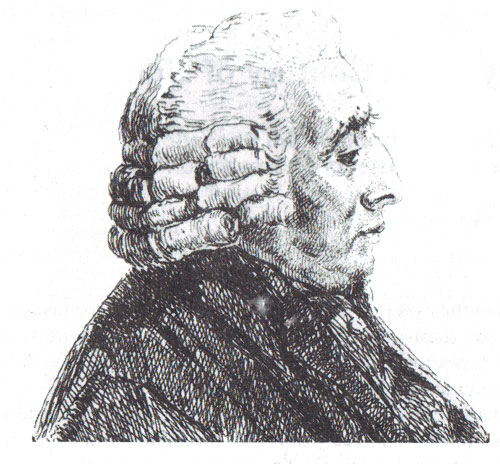
- Georges-Louis Le Sage
- Born: 13 June 1724; Geneva, Republic of Geneva
- Died: 20 November 1803 (aged 79); Geneva, Léman, Revolutionary France
- Known for: Le Sage's theory of gravitation
- Scientific career
- Academic advisors: Jean-Louis Calandrini; Gabriel Cramer
- Notable students: F. H. Jacobi

Georges-Louis Le Sage (French: [lə saʒ]; 13 June 1724 – 20 November 1803) was a Genevan physicist and is most known for his theory of gravitation, for his invention of an electric telegraph and his anticipation of the kinetic theory of gases. He was a contributor to Diderot's Encyclopédie.

== Life and education ==
Le Sage was born in Geneva, his father, a descendant of Théodore Agrippa d'Aubigné, was Georges-Louis Le Sage from Couches in Burgundy, and his mother Anne Marie Camp. His father, who was the author of many papers on various subjects, occupied his son of his own studies early, including the works of the Roman poet Lucretius at the age of 13. According to Pierre Prévost and some notices of Le Sage, the education by his parents in his early years was very strict, and Le Sage reacted to this by isolating himself and with meditation on various subjects. Contrary to his father, who allegedly only accepted facts and had little interest in generalisation, Le Sage was primarily interested in general and abstract principles.

Le Sage took the first regular education at the college of Geneva, where he was friendly connected with Jean-André Deluc. Besides philosophy, he studied mathematics under Gabriel Cramer, and physics under Jean-Louis Calandrini. Later he decided to study medicine in Basel, where he also gave private lessons in mathematics. Here, Le Sage also met Daniel Bernoulli, whose work on the kinetic nature of gases was very influential to him. Then Le Sage left Basel and continued to study medicine in Paris. After he came back to Geneva, Le Sage tried to work as a physician, but it was denied because his father was a native from France. There, he was friendly connected with Charles Bonnet.

Against the will of his father Le Sage devoted his life to mathematics and, in particular, a search for the mechanisms of gravity. He tried to become a professor for mathematics in Geneva, but he couldn't get the position.

Although Le Sage published few papers in his life, he had extensive letter exchanges with people like Jean le Rond d'Alembert, Leonhard Euler, Paolo Frisi, Roger Joseph Boscovich, Johann Heinrich Lambert, Pierre Simon Laplace, Daniel Bernoulli, Firmin Abauzit, Lord Stanhope etc..

He gave private lessons in mathematics, and his pupils, including La Rochefoucauld, Simon Lhuilier, Pierre Prévost, were deeply impressed by his personality. He was a correspondent of the French Academy of Sciences and also became a Fellow of the Royal Society. Le Sage died at the age of 79 in Geneva.

== Character and health ==
Le Sage described his manner of thinking and working by saying:

I have been born with four dispositions well adapted for making progress in science, but with two great defects in the faculties necessary for that purpose. 1. An ardent desire to know the truth; 2. Great activity of mind; 3. An uncommon (justesse) soundness of understanding; 4. A strong desire for precision and distinctness of ideas; 5. An excessive weakness of memory; 6. A great incapacity of continued attention.

Le Sage also suffered from insomnia, and as a result of this he often was unable to work for days. Additionally, in 1762 he had an accident which left him nearly blind.

To compensate the weakness of his memory, he wrote his thoughts on playing cards – over 35000 cards are still lying in the library of Geneva. As a consequence of his mental disposition, many of his papers remained unfinished and unpublished. For example: his main work on Gravitation; a history of theories of gravitation; a treatise on final causes; a biographical note on Nicolas Fatio de Duillier. However, some of them were posthumously published by his pupil Pierre Prévost.

== Telegraph ==
In 1774 he realised an early electric telegraph. The telegraph had a separate wire for each of the 26 letters of the alphabet and its range was only between two rooms of his home.

== Kinetic theory of gases ==
Le Sage also tried to explain the nature of gases. This attempt was appreciated by Rudolf Clausius and James Clerk Maxwell. Maxwell wrote: "His theory of impact is faulty, but his explanation of the expansive force of gases" [i.e., pressure] "is essentially the same as in the dynamical theory, as it now stands." Le Sage also clearly pointed out, that he was not the first one who described such a mechanism, and referred to Lucretius, Gassendi, Hermann and Bernoulli.

== Gravitation ==
=== History ===
In his early youth Le Sage was strongly influenced by the writings of the Roman poet Lucretius and incorporated some of Lucretius' ideas into a mechanical explanation of gravitation, which he subsequently worked on and defended throughout his life. Le Sage wrote in one of his cards, that he developed the basic features of the theory, which was later called Le Sage's theory of gravitation, already in 1743. Then on 15 January 1747 Le Sage wrote to his father:

Eureka, Eureka. Never have I had so much satisfaction as at this moment, when I have just explained rigorously, by the simple law of rectilinear motion, those of universal gravitation, which decreases in the same proportion as the squares of the distance increase.

The first exposition of his theory, "Essai sur l'origine des forces mortes", was created by him in 1748, but was never published. In 1756 one of Le Sage's expositions of the theory was published, and in 1758 he sent a more detailed exposition of the theory to another competition of the French Academy of Sciences. In this paper, entitled "Essai de Chymie Méchanique", he tried to explain both the nature of gravitation and chemical affinities. He shared the prize with one other entrant, but his theory of cohesion never gained acceptance, and only the gravitational portion of the theory was found to be of interest by a few of his contemporaries, including Euler. The exposition of the theory which became accessible to a broader public was "Lucrèce Newtonien" ("The Newtonian Lucretius"), in which the correspondence with Lucretius' concepts was fully developed. Another exposition of the theory was published from Le Sage's notes posthumously by Prévost in 1818, and was called "Physique Mécanique de George Louis Le Sage", but it does not contain anything which was not published in the earlier papers.

=== Le Sage's predecessors ===
Le Sage was not the first to propose what is now called "Le Sage's theory of gravity". Those who had described the theory previously include Fatio, Cramer, and Redeker. The extent to which Le Sage was influenced by these predecessors is a matter of controversy.

==== Fatio ====
The theory now called "Le Sage's theory of gravity" was originally proposed in the 1690s by Nicolas Fatio de Duillier, a friend of Sir Isaac Newton and Christiaan Huygens. Fatio was a well-known Swiss personage, and the kinetic theory of gravitation was his most notable scientific contribution, to which he devoted much of his life. Le Sage said that he heard of Fatio for the first time through his father, because his father had heard the prophecies of the cevénots (camisards), and told him that Fatio was among those prophets. Le Sage's father was well acquainted with the scientific fields in which Fatio worked, and he tutored Le Sage in the sciences. Nevertheless, Le Sage later claimed that his father never told him that Fatio had created a theory of gravitation essentially identical to his own. (Le Sage also admitted that he had a pathologically bad memory, so it is unclear if his recollection is accurate.) In any case, Le Sage stated that he knew nothing of Fatio's theory until he was informed by his teacher Gabriel Cramer in 1749.

A few years after Fatio's death (which occurred in 1753), Le Sage began trying to acquire Fatio's papers to – according to his own words – rescue them from oblivion, and also for a treatise he planned to write on the history of theories of gravitation. One of Fatio's papers was sent to Le Sage by Abauzit in 1758, and other papers were acquired by Le Sage in 1766, 1770 and 1785. He also started a biographical note on Fatio, although he did not complete it, and he tried without success to publish some of Fatio's papers. The Geneva manuscripts were deposited in the library of Geneva by Prévost after Le Sage's death and are still there.

Comparison of Fatio's papers: Zehe (1980), pp. 285–309 The Bopp edition is a full reprint of the only completely surviving manuscript of Fatio, which was preserved by Daniel Bernoulli and published by Karl Bopp in 1929. It contains every part of the Geneva manuscripts (including Problem 1, 2, 3 and 4). The Gagnebin edition from 1949 is based on three (of six) Geneva manuscripts (GM), which were preserved by Le Sage. It includes revisions made by Fatio as late as 1743, forty years after he composed the manuscript on which the Bopp edition was based. However, "Problems 2,3 and 4" contain the mathematically most advanced parts of Fatio's theory, and were not included by Gagnebin in his edition, because he ignored GM 4,5,6.
Geneva manuscripts	Corresponding sections in Gagnebin edition	Date of submission to Le Sage	Corresponding pages in Bopp edition
GM1	34–52	29 March 1766 by J.P. Mallet	pp. 38–45
GM2	1–24	17 October 1770 by F. Jallabert	pp. 22–30
GM3	16–35	Unknown	pp. 27–38
GM4	Not included	Unknown	pp. 50–56 (Problem 4)
GM5	Not included, but the first part is similar to 27–34 (Problem 1)	Unknown	pp. 32–35 (Problem 1), 47–50 (Problem 2 & 3), 53–58 (Problem 4)
GM6	Not included, but some parts are similar to 5, 7–10, 12–16, 19–23, 27–36	21 May 1758 by Firmin Abauzit	partially pp. 22–39 and pp. 47–49 (Problem 2)

Le Sage wrote to Lambert in 1768: "Nicolas Fatio de Duillier had created a theory in 1689, which is so similar to mine, that it only differed in the elasticity, which he has given his intensely agitated matter". There he outlined the great similarity of the theories, but incorrectly claimed that Fatio assumed elastic collisions, even though the loss of speed of the gravitational corpuscles was explicitly stressed by Fatio as a crucial element of his theory. Le Sage sent in a letter to Boscovich the beginning of Fatio's Latin poem (modeled on Lucretius) on the subject of his theory of gravitation, and told him that he wanted to publish it, but Boscovich did not agree, arguing that it would be too hard for most people to understand if it is published in Latin.

Le Sage was worried about the possibility that people might think he had gotten the idea for the gravitation theory from Fatio, because he went to the trouble of making a "certificate", and having it signed by the mathematician Pfleiderer and the astronomer Mallet (two friends of Le Sage), stating that, except for a copy made by Abauzit in 1758, Le Sage saw no papers of Fatio before 1766, and in these papers there was nothing which was not developed by Le Sage in a more detailed way.

In the "Physique Mécanique" published by Prevost after Le Sage's death, Fatio is mentioned in connection with the net structure of matter, but it goes on to claim that he (Le Sage) had developed the idea of the net structure already in 1763, before he was in possession of Fatio's original papers. However, according to Zehe's description of the Abauzit manuscript from 1758, this paper contains Fatio's description of the net structure of matter. In the same paper, Le Sage repeated the incorrect claim that Fatio assumed "elastic" collisions – and therefore did not really provide a valid explanation of gravity. Zehe attempted to account for Le Sage's puzzling claims that Fatio assumed "elastic" collisions by speculating that Le Sage must not have studied Fatio's papers very closely.

In general, Le Sage and Prévost claimed that Le Sage's theory was superior to that of Fatio, but a more recent and detailed analysis of Fatio's paper by Zehe shows that it is Fatio's theory which is more developed.

==== Gabriel Cramer, Franz Albert Redeker ====
According to Le Sage, after creating his first essay on gravitation, he was informed in 1748 by Firmin Abauzit about a very similar theory of Gabriel Cramer, who happens to have been Le Sage's teacher in Geneva. In later years Le Sage responded in two different ways to charges that his ideas on gravitation were only the result of studying Cramer's papers. First, he argued that his first essay was written before he knew of the theories of his predecessors. Second, he argued that even if he knew about Cramer's theory, it makes no difference, because Cramer's theory is too vague and scientifically not valuable. Le Sage did, however, accuse Cramer of plagiarising Fatio's theory. (Fatio himself had made the same accusation.)

In 1751 Le Sage also became aware of Franz Albert Redeker's theory. Le Sage began to write a history of theories of gravitation, in which he intended to describe the theories of Fatio and Redeker, but he never finished it.

==== Summary ====
Although Le Sage acknowledged that he was not the first one to propose such a theory, he always said that he was the first one who ever drew all consequences from the theory, even after coming into possession of Cramer's, Fatio's and Redeker's papers. For example, in his "Lucrece Newtonien" (1782) Le Sage did not mention any of his predecessors by name. He merely stated that it was "likely" such a simple idea had occurred to others previously, but if so, they had "presented it in a vague and ill-assured fashion". He went on to ask rhetorically why none of these supposed predecessors (of whom he professes to have no definite knowledge) "pushed these consequences to their conclusion and communicated their research". He suggested that the answer was that they had no clear view of the subject, had not firmly grasped the principles of the theory, had allowed themselves to be seduced by specious sophisms, had bowed to the authority of great names, or had "lacked sufficient love of truth or courage of their convictions to abandon easy pleasures and exterior advantages in order to devote themselves to researches at the time difficult and little welcome.".

Prévost praised his friend Le Sage for "scrupulously giving credit to his predecessors in all of his writings". However, although he sometimes referred to those predecessors, he often spoke in a derogatory way about them – see his comments in "Lucrece Newtonien", and his appraisal of Cramer as too vague and scientifically not valuable. Lord Kelvin and Aronson repeated Prevost's praise, based only on Prevost's account.
