= Le Sage's theory of gravitation =

Kinetic theory of gravity

Le Sage's theory of gravitation is a kinetic theory of gravity originally proposed by Nicolas Fatio de Duillier in 1690 and later by Georges-Louis Le Sage in 1748. The theory proposed a mechanical explanation for Newton's gravitational force in terms of streams of tiny unseen particles (which Le Sage called ultra-mundane corpuscles) impacting all material objects from all directions. According to this model, any two material bodies partially shield each other from the impinging corpuscles, resulting in a net imbalance in the pressure exerted by the impact of corpuscles on the bodies, tending to drive the bodies together. This mechanical explanation for gravity never gained widespread acceptance.

== Basic theory ==
P1: Single body – no net directional force

The theory posits that the force of gravity is the result of tiny particles (corpuscles) moving at high speed in all directions, throughout the universe. The intensity of the flux of particles is assumed to be the same in all directions, so an isolated object A is struck equally from all sides, resulting in only an inward-directed pressure but no net directional force (P1).

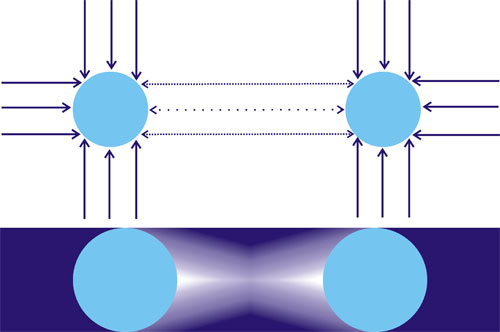
P2: Two bodies "attract" each other

With a second object B present, however, a fraction of the particles that would otherwise have struck A from the direction of B is intercepted, so B works as a shield, i.e. from the direction of B, A will be struck by fewer particles than from the opposite direction. Likewise B will be struck by fewer particles from the direction of A than from the opposite direction. One can say that A and B are "shadowing" each other, and the two bodies are pushed toward each other by the resulting imbalance of forces (P2). Thus the apparent attraction between bodies is, according to this theory, actually a diminished push from the direction of other bodies, so the theory is sometimes called push gravity or shadow gravity, although it is more widely referred to as Lesage gravity.

=== Nature of collisions ===
P3: Opposite streams

If the collisions of body A and the gravific particles are fully elastic, the intensity of the reflected particles would be as strong as of the incoming ones, so no net directional force would arise. The same is true if a second body B is introduced, where B acts as a shield against gravific particles in the direction of A. The gravific particle C which ordinarily would strike on A is blocked by B, but another particle D which ordinarily would not have struck A, is re-directed by the reflection on B, and therefore replaces C. Thus if the collisions are fully elastic, the reflected particles between A and B would fully compensate any shadowing effect. In order to account for a net gravitational force, it must be assumed that the collisions are not fully elastic, or at least that the reflected particles are slowed, so that their momentum is reduced after the impact. This would result in streams with diminished momentum departing from A, and streams with undiminished momentum arriving at A, so a net directional momentum toward the center of A would arise (P3). Under this assumption, the reflected particles in the two-body case will not fully compensate the shadowing effect, because the reflected flux is weaker than the incident flux.

=== Inverse square law ===
P4: Inverse square relation

Since it is assumed that some or all of the gravific particles converging on an object are either absorbed or slowed by the object, it follows that the intensity of the flux of gravific particles emanating from the direction of a massive object is less than the flux converging on the object. We can imagine this imbalance of momentum flow – and therefore of the force exerted on any other body in the vicinity – distributed over a spherical surface centered on the object (P4). The imbalance of momentum flow over an entire spherical surface enclosing the object is independent of the size of the enclosing sphere, whereas the surface area of the sphere increases in proportion to the square of the radius. Therefore, the momentum imbalance per unit area decreases inversely as the square of the distance.

=== Mass proportionality ===
From the premises outlined so far, there arises only a force which is proportional to the surface of the bodies. But gravity is proportional to the masses. To satisfy the need for mass proportionality, the theory posits that a) the basic elements of matter are very small so that gross matter consists mostly of empty space, and b) that the particles are so small, that only a small fraction of them would be intercepted by gross matter. The result is, that the "shadow" of each body is proportional to the surface of every single element of matter. If it is then assumed that the elementary opaque elements of all matter are identical (i.e., having the same ratio of density to area), it will follow that the shadow effect is, at least approximately, proportional to the mass (P5).

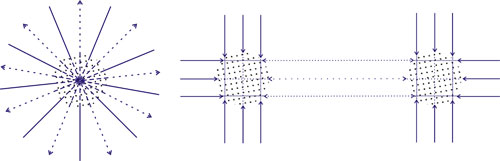
P5: Permeability, attenuation and mass proportionality

== Fatio ==
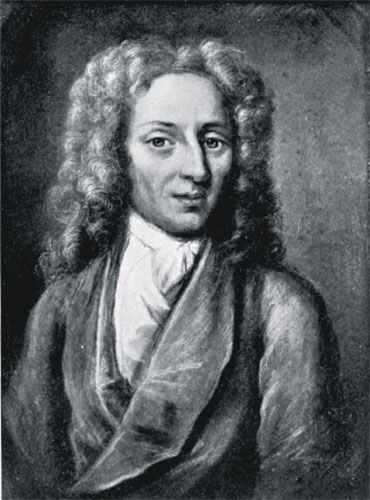
Nicolas Fatio

Nicolas Fatio presented the first formulation of his thoughts on gravitation in a letter to Christiaan Huygens in the spring of 1690. Two days later Fatio read the content of the letter before the Royal Society in London. In the following years Fatio composed several draft manuscripts of his major work De la Cause de la Pesanteur, but none of this material was published in his lifetime. In 1731 Fatio also sent his theory as a Latin poem, in the style of Lucretius, to the Paris Academy of Science, but it was dismissed. Some fragments of these manuscripts and copies of the poem were later acquired by Le Sage who failed to find a publisher for Fatio's papers. So it lasted until 1929, when the only complete copy of Fatio's manuscript was published by Karl Bopp, and in 1949 Gagnebin used the collected fragments in possession of Le Sage to reconstruct the paper. The Gagnebin edition includes revisions made by Fatio as late as 1743, forty years after he composed the draft on which the Bopp edition was based. However, the second half of the Bopp edition contains the mathematically most advanced parts of Fatio's theory, and were not included by Gagnebin in his edition. For a detailed analysis of Fatio's work, and a comparison between the Bopp and the Gagnebin editions, see Zehe. The following description is mainly based on the Bopp edition.

=== Features of Fatio's theory ===
==== Fatio's pyramid (Problem I) ====
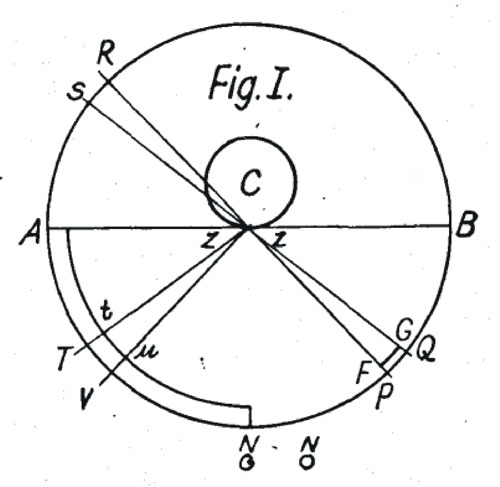
P6: Fatio's pyramid

Fatio assumed that the universe is filled with minute particles, which are moving indiscriminately with very high speed and rectilinearly in all directions. To illustrate his thoughts he used the following example: Suppose an object C, on which an infinite small plane zz and a sphere centered about zz is drawn. Into this sphere Fatio placed the pyramid PzzQ, in which some particles are streaming in the direction of zz and also some particles, which were already reflected by C and therefore depart from zz. Fatio proposed that the mean velocity of the reflected particles is lower and therefore their momentum is weaker than that of the incident particles. The result is one stream, which pushes all bodies in the direction of zz. So on one hand the speed of the stream remains constant, but on the other hand at larger proximity to zz the density of the stream increases and therefore its intensity is proportional to 1/r^{2}. And because one can draw an infinite number of such pyramids around C, the proportionality applies to the entire range around C.

==== Reduced speed ====
In order to justify the assumption, that the particles are traveling after their reflection with diminished velocities, Fatio stated the following assumptions:

- Either ordinary matter, or the gravific particles, or both are inelastic, or
- the impacts are fully elastic, but the particles are not absolutely hard, and therefore are in a state of vibration after the impact, and/or
- due to friction the particles begin to rotate after their impacts.

These passages are the most incomprehensible parts of Fatio's theory, because he never clearly decided which sort of collision he actually preferred. However, in the last version of his theory in 1742 he shortened the related passages and ascribed "perfect elasticity or spring force" to the particles and on the other hand "imperfect elasticity" to gross matter, therefore the particles would be reflected with diminished velocities. Additionally, Fatio faced another problem: What is happening if the particles collide with each other? Inelastic collisions would lead to a steady decrease of the particle speed and therefore a decrease of the gravitational force. To avoid this problem, Fatio supposed that the diameter of the particles is very small compared to their mutual distance, so their interactions are very rare.

==== Condensation ====
Fatio thought for a long time that, since corpuscles approach material bodies at a higher speed than they recede from them (after reflection), there would be a progressive accumulation of corpuscles near material bodies (an effect which he called "condensation"). However, he later realized that although the incoming corpuscles are quicker, they are spaced further apart than are the reflected corpuscles, so the inward and outward flow rates are the same. Hence there is no secular accumulation of corpuscles, i.e., the density of the reflected corpuscles remains constant (assuming that they are small enough that no noticeably greater rate of self-collision occurs near the massive body). More importantly, Fatio noted that, by increasing both the velocity and the elasticity of the corpuscles, the difference between the speeds of the incoming and reflected corpuscles (and hence the difference in densities) can be made arbitrarily small while still maintaining the same effective gravitational force.

==== Porosity of gross matter ====
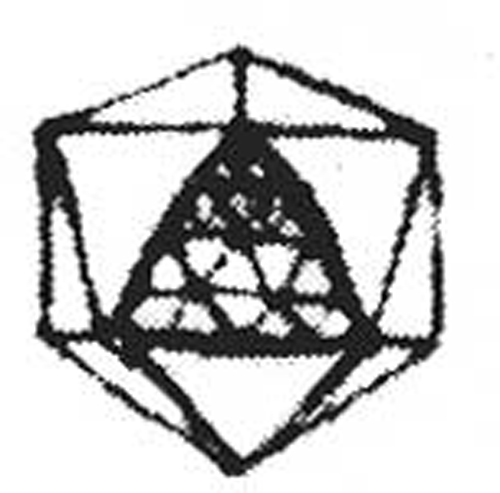
P7: Crystal lattice (icosahedron)

In order to ensure mass proportionality, Fatio assumed that gross matter is extremely permeable to the flux of corpuscles. He sketched 3 models to justify this assumption:

- He assumed that matter is an accumulation of small "balls" whereby their diameter compared with their distance among themselves is "infinitely" small. But he rejected this proposal, because under this condition the bodies would approach each other and therefore would not remain stable.
- Then he assumed that the balls could be connected through bars or lines and would form some kind of crystal lattice. However, he rejected this model too – if several atoms are together, the gravific fluid is not able to penetrate this structure equally in all direction, and therefore mass proportionality is impossible.
- At the end Fatio also removed the balls and only left the lines or the net. By making them "infinitely" smaller than their distance among themselves, thereby a maximum penetration capacity could be achieved.

==== Pressure force of the particles (Problem II) ====
Already in 1690 Fatio assumed, that the "push force" exerted by the particles on a plain surface is the sixth part of the force, which would be produced if all particles are lined up normal to the surface. Fatio now gave a proof of this proposal by determination of the force, which is exerted by the particles on a certain point zz. He derived the formula p = ρv^{2}zz/6. This solution is very similar to the formula known in the kinetic theory of gases p = ρv^{2}/3, which was found by Daniel Bernoulli in 1738. This was the first time that a solution analogous to the similar result in kinetic theory was pointed out – long before the basic concept of the latter theory was developed. However, Bernoulli's value is twice as large as Fatio's one, because according to Zehe, Fatio only calculated the value mv for the change of impulse after the collision, but not 2mv and therefore got the wrong result. (His result is only correct in the case of totally inelastic collisions.) Fatio tried to use his solution not only for explaining gravitation, but for explaining the behaviour of gases as well. He tried to construct a thermometer, which should indicate the "state of motion" of the air molecules and therefore estimate the temperature. But Fatio (unlike Bernoulli) did not identify heat and the movements of the air particles – he used another fluid, which should be responsible for this effect. It is also unknown, whether Bernoulli was influenced by Fatio or not.

==== Infinity (Problem III) ====
In this chapter Fatio examines the connections between the term infinity and its relations to his theory. Fatio often justified his considerations with the fact that different phenomena are "infinitely smaller or larger" than others and so many problems can be reduced to an undetectable value. For example, the diameter of the bars is infinitely smaller than their distance to each other; or the speed of the particles is infinitely larger than those of gross matter; or the speed difference between reflected and non-reflected particles is infinitely small.

==== Resistance of the medium (Problem IV) ====
This is the mathematically most complex part of Fatio's theory. There he tried to estimate the resistance of the particle streams for moving bodies. Supposing u is the velocity of gross matter, v is the velocity of the gravific particles and ρ the density of the medium. In the case v ≪ u and ρ = constant Fatio stated that the resistance is ρu^{2}. In the case v ≫ u and ρ = constant the resistance is 4/3ρuv. Now, Newton stated that the lack of resistance to the orbital motion requires an extreme sparseness of any medium in space. So Fatio decreased the density of the medium and stated, that to maintain sufficient gravitational force this reduction must be compensated by changing v "inverse proportional to the square root of the density". This follows from Fatio's particle pressure, which is proportional to ρv^{2}. According to Zehe, Fatio's attempt to increase v to a very high value would actually leave the resistance very small compared with gravity, because the resistance in Fatio's model is proportional to ρuv but gravity (i.e. the particle pressure) is proportional to ρv^{2}.

=== Reception of Fatio's theory ===
Fatio was in communication with some of the most famous scientists of his time.

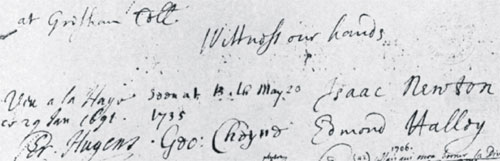
P8: Signatures of Newton, Huygens and Halley on Fatio's manuscript

There was a strong personal relationship between Isaac Newton and Fatio in the years 1690 to 1693. Newton's statements on Fatio's theory differed widely. For example, after describing the necessary conditions for a mechanical explanation of gravity, he wrote in an (unpublished) note in his own printed copy of the Principia in 1692:The unique hypothesis by which gravity can be explained is however of this kind, and was first devised by the most ingenious geometer Mr. N. Fatio. On the other hand, Fatio himself stated that although Newton had commented privately that Fatio's theory was the best possible mechanical explanation of gravity, he also acknowledged that Newton tended to believe that the true explanation of gravitation was not mechanical. Also, Gregory noted in his "Memoranda": "Mr. Newton and Mr. Halley laugh at Mr. Fatio's manner of explaining gravity." This was allegedly noted by him on December 28, 1691. However, the real date is unknown, because both ink and feather which were used, differ from the rest of the page. After 1694, the relationship between the two men cooled down.

Christiaan Huygens was the first person informed by Fatio of his theory, but never accepted it. Fatio believed he had convinced Huygens of the consistency of his theory, but Huygens denied this in a letter to Gottfried Leibniz. There was also a short correspondence between Fatio and Leibniz on the theory. Leibniz criticized Fatio's theory for demanding empty space between the particles, which was rejected by him (Leibniz) on philosophical grounds. Jakob Bernoulli expressed an interest in Fatio's Theory, and urged Fatio to write his thoughts on gravitation in a complete manuscript, which was actually done by Fatio. Bernoulli then copied the manuscript, which now resides in the university library of Basel, and was the base of the Bopp edition.

Nevertheless, Fatio's theory remained largely unknown with a few exceptions like Cramer and Le Sage, because he never was able to formally publish his works and he fell under the influence of a group of religious fanatics called the "French prophets" (which belonged to the camisards) and therefore his public reputation was ruined.

== Cramer and Redeker ==
In 1731 the Swiss mathematician Gabriel Cramer published a dissertation, at the end of which appeared a sketch of a theory very similar to Fatio's – including net structure of matter, analogy to light, shading – but without mentioning Fatio's name. It was known to Fatio that Cramer had access to a copy of his main paper, so he accused Cramer of only repeating his theory without understanding it. It was also Cramer who informed Le Sage about Fatio's theory in 1749. In 1736 the German physician Franz Albert Redeker also published a similar theory. Any connection between Redeker and Fatio is unknown.

== Le Sage ==
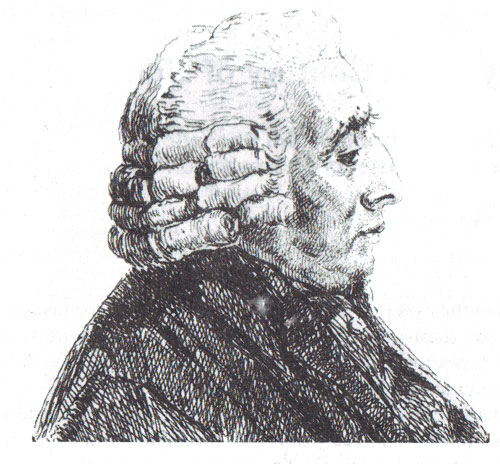
Georges-Louis Le Sage

The first exposition of his theory, Essai sur l'origine des forces mortes, was sent by Le Sage to the Academy of Sciences at Paris in 1748, but it was never published. According to Le Sage, after creating and sending his essay he was informed on the theories of Fatio, Cramer and Redeker. In 1756 for the first time one of his expositions of the theory was published, and in 1758 he sent a more detailed exposition, Essai de Chymie Méchanique, to a competition to the Academy of Sciences in Rouen. In this paper he tried to explain both the nature of gravitation and chemical affinities. The exposition of the theory which became accessible to a broader public, Lucrèce Newtonien (1784), in which the correspondence with Lucretius' concepts was fully developed. Another exposition of the theory was published from Le Sage's notes posthumously by Pierre Prévost in 1818.

=== Le Sage's basic concept ===
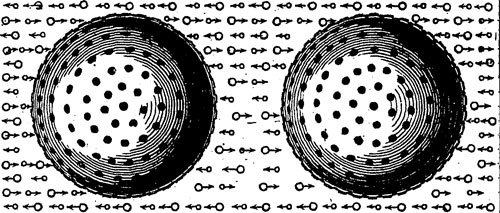
P9: Le Sage's own illustration of his ultramundane corpuscles

Le Sage discussed the theory in great detail and he proposed quantitative estimates for some of the theory's parameters.

- He called the gravitational particles ultramundane corpuscles, because he supposed them to originate beyond our known universe. The distribution of the ultramundane flux is isotropic and the laws of its propagation are very similar to that of light.
- Le Sage argued that no gravitational force would arise if the matter-particle-collisions are perfectly elastic . So he proposed that the particles and the basic constituents of matter are "absolutely hard" and asserted that this implies a complicated form of interaction, completely inelastic in the direction normal to the surface of the ordinary matter, and perfectly elastic in the direction tangential to the surface. He then commented that this implies the mean speed of scattered particles is 2/3 of their incident speed. To avoid inelastic collisions between the particles, he supposed that their diameter is very small relative to their mutual distance.
- That resistance of the flux is proportional to uv (where v is the velocity of the particles and u that of gross matter) and gravity is proportional to v^{2}, so the ratio resistance/gravity can be made arbitrarily small by increasing v. Therefore, he suggested that the ultramundane corpuscles might move at the speed of light, but after further consideration he adjusted this to 10^{5} times the speed of light.
- To maintain mass proportionality, ordinary matter consists of cage-like structures, in which their diameter is only the 10^{7}th part of their mutual distance. Also the "bars", which constitute the cages, were small (around 10^{20} times as long as thick) relative to the dimensions of the cages, so the particles can travel through them nearly unhindered.
- Le Sage also attempted to use the shadowing mechanism to account for the forces of cohesion, and for forces of different strengths, by positing the existence of multiple species of ultramundane corpuscles of different sizes, as illustrated in Figure 9.

Le Sage said that he was the first one, who drew all consequences from the theory and also Prévost said that Le Sage's theory was more developed than Fatio's theory. However, by comparing the two theories and after a detailed analysis of Fatio's papers (which also were in possession of Le Sage) Zehe judged that Le Sage contributed nothing essentially new and he often did not reach Fatio's level.

=== Reception of Le Sage's theory ===
Le Sage's ideas were not well-received during his day, except for some of his friends and associates like Pierre Prévost, Charles Bonnet, Jean-André Deluc, Charles Mahon, 3rd Earl Stanhope and Simon L'Huillier. They mentioned and described Le Sage's theory in their books and papers, which were used by their contemporaries as a secondary source for Le Sage's theory (because of the lack of published papers by Le Sage himself) .

==== Euler, Bernoulli, and Boscovich ====
Leonhard Euler once remarked that Le Sage's model was "infinitely better" than that of all other authors, and that all objections are balanced out in this model, but later he said the analogy to light had no weight for him, because he believed in the wave nature of light. After further consideration, Euler came to disapprove of the model, and he wrote to Le Sage:

You must excuse me Sir, if I have a great repugnance for your ultramundane corpuscles, and I shall always prefer to confess my ignorance of the cause of gravity than to have recourse to such strange hypotheses.

Daniel Bernoulli was pleased by the similarity of Le Sage's model and his own thoughts on the nature of gases. However, Bernoulli himself was of the opinion that his own kinetic theory of gases was only a speculation, and likewise he regarded Le Sage's theory as highly speculative.

Roger Joseph Boscovich pointed out that Le Sage's theory is the first one that actually can explain gravity by mechanical means. However, he rejected the model because of the enormous and unused quantity of ultramundane matter. John Playfair described Boscovich's arguments by saying:

An immense multitude of atoms, thus destined to pursue their never ending journey through the infinity of space, without changing their direction, or returning to the place from which they came, is a supposition very little countenanced by the usual economy of nature. Whence is the supply of these innumerable torrents; must it not involve a perpetual exertion of creative power, infinite both in extent and in duration?

A very similar argument was later given by Maxwell (see the sections below). Additionally, Boscovich denied the existence of all contact and immediate impulse at all, but proposed repulsive and attractive actions at a distance.

==== Lichtenberg, Kant, and Schelling ====
Georg Christoph Lichtenberg's knowledge of Le Sage's theory was based on "Lucrece Newtonien" and a summary by Prévost. Lichtenberg originally believed (like Descartes) that every explanation of natural phenomena must be based on rectilinear motion and impulsion, and Le Sage's theory fulfilled these conditions. In 1790 he expressed in one of his papers his enthusiasm for the theory, believing that Le Sage's theory embraces all of our knowledge and makes any further dreaming on that topic useless. He went on by saying: "If it is a dream, it is the greatest and the most magnificent which was ever dreamed..." and that we can fill with it a gap in our books, which can only be filled by a dream.

He often referred to Le Sage's theory in his lectures on physics at the University of Göttingen. However, around 1796 Lichtenberg changed his views after being persuaded by the arguments of Immanuel Kant, who criticized any kind of theory that attempted to replace attraction with impulsion. Kant pointed out that the very existence of spatially extended configurations of matter, such as particles of non-zero radius, implies the existence of some sort of binding force to hold the extended parts of the particle together. Now, that force cannot be explained by the push from the gravitational particles, because those particles too must hold together in the same way. To avoid this circular reasoning, Kant asserted that there must exist a fundamental attractive force. This was precisely the same objection that had always been raised against the impulse doctrine of Descartes in the previous century, and had led even the followers of Descartes to abandon that aspect of his philosophy.

Another German philosopher, Friedrich Wilhelm Joseph Schelling, rejected Le Sage's model because its mechanistic materialism was incompatible with Schelling's very idealistic and anti-materialistic philosophy.

==== Laplace ====
Partly in consideration of Le Sage's theory, Pierre-Simon Laplace undertook to determine the necessary speed of gravity in order to be consistent with astronomical observations. He calculated that the speed must be "at least a hundred millions of times greater than that of light", in order to avoid unacceptably large inequalities due to aberration effects in the lunar motion. This was taken by most researchers, including Laplace, as support for the Newtonian concept of instantaneous action at a distance, and to indicate the implausibility of any model such as Le Sage's. Laplace also argued that to maintain mass-proportionality the upper limit for Earth's molecular surface area is at the most the ten-millionth of Earth's surface. To Le Sage's disappointment, Laplace never directly mentioned Le Sage's theory in his works.

== Kinetic theory ==
Because the theories of Fatio, Cramer and Redeker were not widely known, Le Sage's exposition of the theory enjoyed a resurgence of interest in the latter half of the 19th century, coinciding with the development of the kinetic theory of gases.

=== Leray ===
Since Le Sage's particles must lose speed when colliding with ordinary matter (in order to produce a net gravitational force), a huge amount of energy must be converted to internal energy modes. If those particles have no internal energy modes, the excess energy can only be absorbed by ordinary matter. Addressing this problem, Armand Jean Leray proposed a particle model (perfectly similar to Le Sage's) in which he asserted that the absorbed energy is used by the bodies to produce magnetism and heat. He suggested, that this might be an answer for the question of where the energy output of the stars comes from.

=== Kelvin and Tait ===
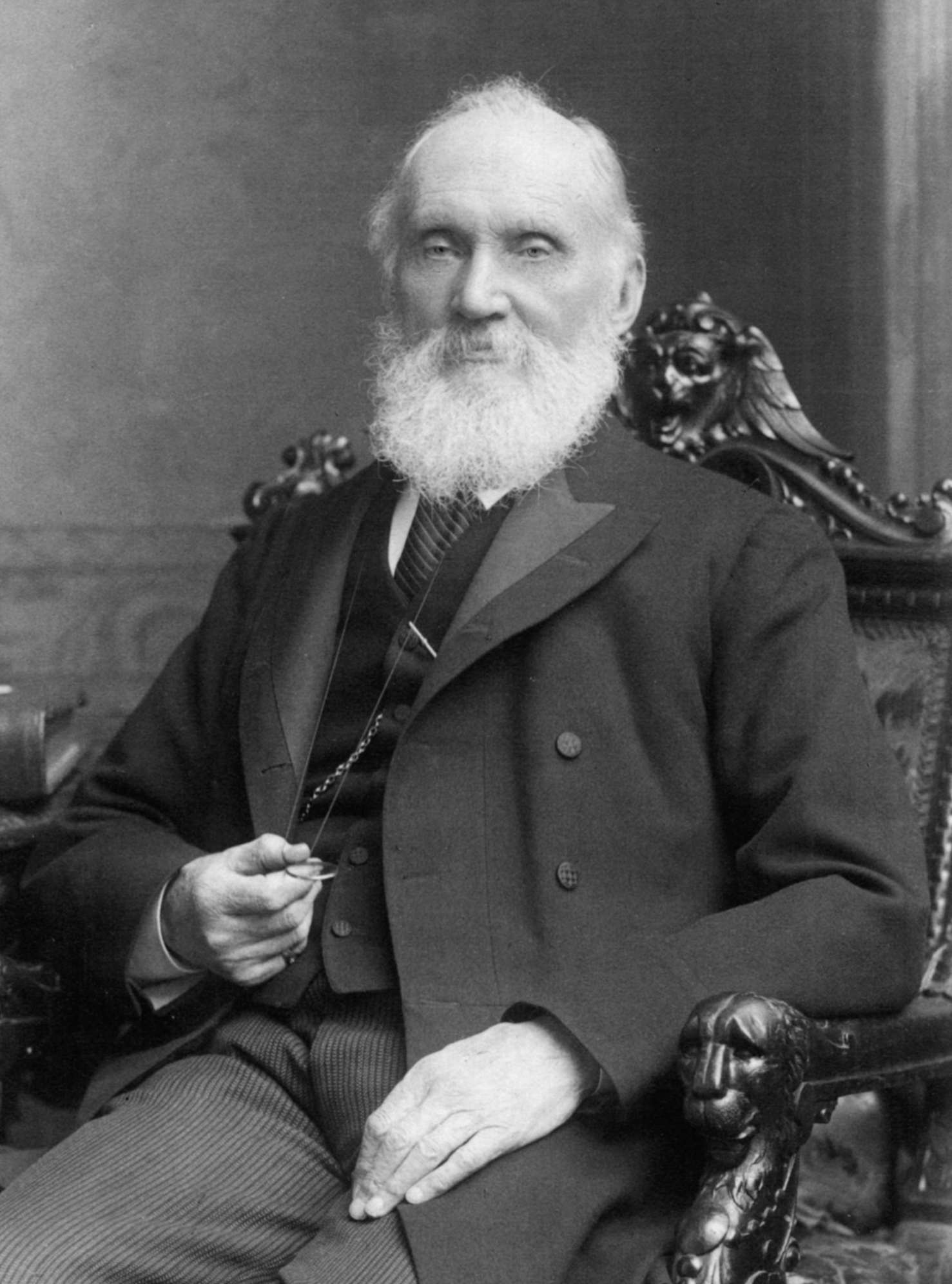
Lord Kelvin

Le Sage's own theory became a subject of renewed interest in the latter part of the 19th century following a paper published by Kelvin in 1873. Unlike Leray, who treated the heat problem imprecisely, Kelvin stated that the absorbed energy represents a very high heat, sufficient to vaporize any object in a fraction of a second. So Kelvin reiterated an idea that Fatio had originally proposed in the 1690s for attempting to deal with the thermodynamic problem inherent in Le Sage's theory. He proposed that the excess heat might be absorbed by internal energy modes of the particles themselves, based on his proposal of the vortex-nature of matter. In other words, the original translational kinetic energy of the particles is transferred to internal energy modes, chiefly vibrational or rotational, of the particles. Appealing to Clausius's proposition that the energy in any particular mode of a gas molecule tends toward a fixed ratio of the total energy, Kelvin went on to suggest that the energized but slower moving particles would subsequently be restored to their original condition due to collisions (on the cosmological scale) with other particles. Kelvin also asserted that it would be possible to extract limitless amounts of free energy from the ultramundane flux, and described a perpetual motion machine to accomplish this.

Subsequently, Peter Guthrie Tait called the Le Sage theory the only plausible explanation of gravitation which has been propounded at that time. He went on by saying:

The most singular thing about it is that, if it be true, it will probably lead us to regard all kinds of energy as ultimately Kinetic.

Kelvin himself, however, was not optimistic that Le Sage's theory could ultimately give a satisfactory account of phenomena. After his brief paper in 1873 noted above, he never returned to the subject, except to make the following comment:

This kinetic theory of matter is a dream, and can be nothing else, until it can explain chemical affinity, electricity, magnetism, gravitation, and the inertia of masses (that is, crowds) of vortices. Le Sage's theory might give an explanation of gravity and of its relation to inertia of masses, on the vortex theory, were it not for the essential aeolotropy of crystals, and the seemingly perfect isotropy of gravity. No finger post pointing towards a way that can possibly lead to a surmounting of this difficulty, or a turning of its flank, has been discovered, or imagined as discoverable.

=== Preston ===
Samuel Tolver Preston illustrated that many of the postulates introduced by Le Sage concerning the gravitational particles, such as rectilinear motion, rare interactions, etc.., could be collected under the single notion that they behaved (on the cosmological scale) as the particles of a gas with an extremely long mean free path. Preston also accepted Kelvin's proposal of internal energy modes of the particles. He illustrated Kelvin's model by comparing it with the collision of a steel ring and an anvil – the anvil would not be shaken very much, but the steel ring would be in a state of vibration and therefore departs with diminished velocity. He also argued, that the mean free path of the particles is at least the distance between the planets – on longer distances the particles regain their translational energy due collisions with each other, so he concluded that on longer distances there would be no attraction between the bodies, independent of their size. Paul Drude suggested that this could possibly be a connection with some theories of Carl Gottfried Neumann and Hugo von Seeliger, who proposed some sort of absorption of gravity in open space.

=== Maxwell ===
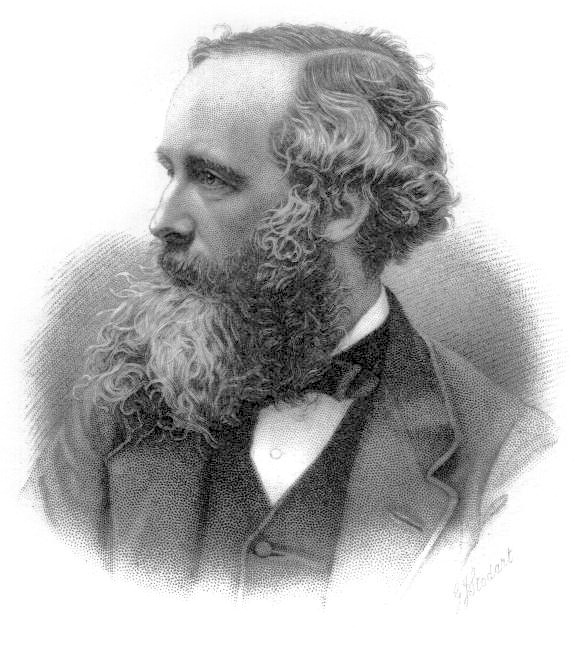
James Clerk Maxwell

A review of the Kelvin-Le Sage theory was published by James Clerk Maxwell in the Ninth Edition of the Encyclopædia Britannica under the title Atom in 1875. After describing the basic concept of the theory he wrote (with sarcasm according to Aronson):

Here, then, seems to be a path leading towards an explanation of the law of gravitation, which, if it can be shown to be in other respects consistent with facts, may turn out to be a royal road into the very arcana of science.

Maxwell commented on Kelvin's suggestion of different energy modes of the particles that this implies the gravitational particles are not simple primitive entities, but rather systems, with their own internal energy modes, which must be held together by (unexplained) forces of attraction. He argues that the temperature of bodies must tend to approach that at which the average kinetic energy of a molecule of the body would be equal to the average kinetic energy of an ultra-mundane particle and he states that the latter quantity must be much greater than the former and concludes that ordinary matter should be incinerated within seconds under the Le Sage bombardment. He wrote:

We have devoted more space to this theory than it seems to deserve, because it is ingenious, and because it is the only theory of the cause of gravitation which has been so far developed as to be capable of being attacked and defended.

Maxwell also argued that the theory requires "an enormous expenditure of external power" and therefore violating the conservation of energy as the fundamental principle of nature. Preston responded to Maxwell's criticism by arguing that the kinetic energy of each individual simple particle could be made arbitrarily low by positing a sufficiently low mass (and higher number density) for the particles. But this issue later was discussed in a more detailed way by Poincaré, who showed that the thermodynamic problem within Le Sage models remained unresolved.

=== Isenkrahe, Ryšánek, du Bois-Reymond ===
Caspar Isenkrahe presented his model in a variety of publications between 1879 and 1915. His basic assumptions were very similar to those of Le Sage and Preston, but he gave a more detailed application of the kinetic theory. However, by asserting that the velocity of the corpuscles after collision was reduced without any corresponding increase in the energy of any other object, his model violated the conservation of energy. He noted that there is a connection between the weight of a body and its density (because any decrease in the density of an object reduces the internal shielding) so he went on to assert that warm bodies should be heavier than colder ones (related to the effect of thermal expansion).

In another model Adalbert Ryšánek in 1887 also gave a careful analysis, including an application of Maxwell's law of the particle velocities in a gas. He distinguished between a gravitational and a luminiferous aether. This separation of those two mediums was necessary, because according to his calculations the absence of any drag effect in the orbit of Neptune implies a lower limit for the particle velocity of 5 · 10^{19} cm/s. He (like Leray) argued that the absorbed energy is converted into heat, which might be transferred into the luminiferous aether and/or is used by the stars to maintain their energy output. However, these qualitative suggestions were unsupported by any quantitative evaluation of the amount of heat actually produced.

In 1888 Paul du Bois-Reymond argued against Le Sage's model, partly because the predicted force of gravity in Le Sage's theory is not strictly proportional to mass. In order to achieve exact mass proportionality as in Newton's theory (which implies no shielding or saturation effects and an infinitely porous structure of matter), the ultramundane flux must be infinitely intense. Du Bois-Reymond rejected this as absurd. In addition, du Bois-Reymond like Kant observed that Le Sage's theory cannot meet its goal, because it invokes concepts like "elasticity" and "absolute hardness" etc., which (in his opinion) can only be explained by means of attractive forces. The same problem arises for the cohesive forces in molecules. As a result, the basic intent of such models, which is to dispense with elementary forces of attraction, is impossible.

== Wave models ==
=== Keller and Boisbaudran ===
In 1863, François Antoine Edouard and Em. Keller presented a theory by using a Le Sage type mechanism in combination with longitudinal waves of the aether. They supposed that those waves are propagating in every direction and losing some of their momentum after the impact on bodies, so between two bodies the pressure exerted by the waves is weaker than the pressure around them. In 1869, Paul-Emile Lecoq de Boisbaudran presented the same model as Leray (including absorption and the production of heat etc.), but like Keller and Keller, he replaced the particles with longitudinal waves of the aether.

=== Lorentz ===
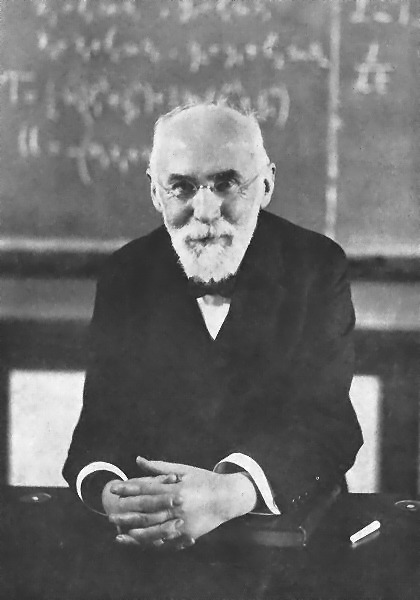
Hendrik Antoon Lorentz

After these attempts, other authors in the early 20th century substituted electromagnetic radiation for Le Sage's particles. This was in connection with Lorentz ether theory and the electron theory of that time, in which the electrical constitution of matter was assumed.

In 1900 Hendrik Lorentz wrote that Le Sage's particle model is not consistent with the electron theory of his time. But the realization that trains of electromagnetic waves could produce some pressure, in combination with the penetrating power of Röntgen rays (now called x-rays), led him to conclude that nothing argues against the possible existence of even more penetrating radiation than x-rays, which could replace Le Sage's particles. Lorentz showed that an attractive force between charged particles (which might be taken to model the elementary subunits of matter) would indeed arise, but only if the incident energy were entirely absorbed. This was the same fundamental problem which had afflicted the particle models. So Lorentz wrote:

The circumstance however, that this attraction could only exist, if in some way or other electromagnetic energy were continually disappearing, is so serious a difficulty, that what has been said cannot be considered as furnishing an explanation of gravitation. Nor is this the only objection that can be raised. If the mechanism of gravitation consisted in vibrations which cross the aether with the velocity of light, the attraction ought to be modified by the motion of the celestial bodies to a much larger extent than astronomical observations make it possible to admit.

In 1922 Lorentz first examined Martin Knudsen's investigation on rarefied gases and in connection with that he discussed Le Sage's particle model, followed by a summary of his own electromagnetic Le Sage model – but he repeated his conclusion from 1900: Without absorption no gravitational effect.

In 1913 David Hilbert referred to Lorentz's theory and criticised it by arguing that no force in the form 1/r^{2} can arise, if the mutual distance of the atoms is large enough when compared with their wavelength.

=== J.J. Thomson ===
In 1904 J. J. Thomson considered a Le Sage-type model in which the primary ultramundane flux consisted of a hypothetical form of radiation much more penetrating even than x-rays. He argued that Maxwell's heat problem might be avoided by assuming that the absorbed energy is not converted into heat, but re-radiated in a still more penetrating form. He noted that this process possibly can explain where the energy of radioactive substances comes from – however, he stated that an internal cause of radioactivity is more probable. In 1911 Thomson went back to this subject in his article "Matter" in the Encyclopædia Britannica Eleventh Edition. There he stated, that this form of secondary radiation is somewhat analogous to how the passage of electrified particles through matter causes the radiation of the even more penetrating x-rays. He remarked:

It is a very interesting result of recent discoveries that the machinery which Le Sage introduced for the purpose of his theory has a very close analogy with things for which we have now direct experimental evidence....Röntgen rays, however, when absorbed do not, as far as we know, give rise to more penetrating Röntgen rays as they should to explain attraction, but either to less penetrating rays or to rays of the same kind.

=== Tommasina and Brush ===
Unlike Lorentz and Thomson, Thomas Tommasina between 1903 and 1928 suggested long wavelength radiation to explain gravity, and short wavelength radiation for explaining the cohesive forces of matter. Charles F. Brush in 1911 also proposed long wavelength radiation. But he later revised his view and changed to extremely short wavelengths.

== Later assessments ==
=== Darwin ===
In 1905, George Darwin subsequently calculated the gravitational force between two bodies at extremely close range to determine if geometrical effects would lead to a deviation from Newton's law. Here Darwin replaced Le Sage's cage-like units of ordinary matter with microscopic hard spheres of uniform size. He concluded that only in the instance of perfectly inelastic collisions (zero reflection) would Newton's law stand up, thus reinforcing the thermodynamic problem of Le Sage's theory. Also, such a theory is only valid if the normal and the tangential components of impact are totally inelastic (contrary to Le Sage's scattering mechanism), and the elementary particles are exactly of the same size. He went on to say that the emission of light is the exact converse of the absorption of Le Sage's particles. A body with different surface temperatures will move in the direction of the colder part. In a later review of gravitational theories, Darwin briefly described Le Sage's theory and said he gave the theory serious consideration, but then wrote:

I will not refer further to this conception, save to say that I believe that no man of science is disposed to accept it as affording the true road.

=== Poincaré ===
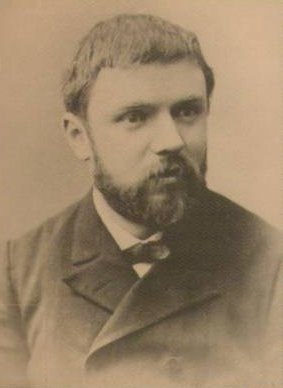
Henri Poincaré

Partially based on the calculations of Darwin, an important criticism was given by Henri Poincaré in 1908. He concluded that the attraction is proportional to $S\sqrt{\rho}v$, where S is earth's molecular surface area, v is the velocity of the particles, and ρ is the density of the medium. Following Laplace, he argued that to maintain mass-proportionality the upper limit for S is at the most a ten-millionth of the Earth's surface. Now, drag (i.e. the resistance of the medium) is proportional to Sρv and therefore the ratio of drag to attraction is inversely proportional to Sv. To reduce drag, Poincaré calculated a lower limit for v = 24 · 10^{17} times the speed of light. So there are lower limits for Sv and v, and an upper limit for S and with those values one can calculate the produced heat, which is proportional to Sρv^{3}. The calculation shows that earth's temperature would rise by 10^{26} degrees per second. Poincaré noticed, "that the earth could not long stand such a regime." Poincaré also analyzed some wave models (Tommasina and Lorentz), remarking that they suffered the same problems as the particle models. To reduce drag, superluminal wave velocities were necessary, and they would still be subject to the heating problem. After describing a similar re-radiation model like Thomson, he concluded: "Such are the complicated hypotheses to which we are led when we seek to make Le Sage's theory tenable".

He also stated that if in Lorentz' model the absorbed energy is fully converted into heat, that would raise earth's temperature by 10^{13} degrees per second. Poincaré then went on to consider Le Sage's theory in the context of the "new dynamics" that had been developed at the end of the 19th and the beginning of the 20th centuries, specifically recognizing the relativity principle. For a particle theory, he remarked that "it is difficult to imagine a law of collision compatible with the principle of relativity", and the problems of drag and heating remain.

== Predictions and criticism ==
=== Matter and particles ===
==== Porosity of matter ====
A basic prediction of the theory is the extreme porosity of matter. As supposed by Fatio and Le Sage in 1690/1758 (and before them, Huygens) matter must consist mostly of empty space so that the very small particles can penetrate the bodies nearly undisturbed and therefore every single part of matter can take part in the gravitational interaction. This prediction has been (in some respects) confirmed over the course of the time. Indeed, matter consists mostly of empty space and certain particles like neutrinos can pass through matter nearly unhindered. However, the image of elementary particles as classical entities that interact directly, determined by their shapes and sizes (in the sense of the net structure proposed by Fatio/Le Sage and the equisized spheres of Isenkrahe/Darwin), is not consistent with current understanding of elementary particles. The Lorentz/Thomson proposal of electrically charged particles as the basic constituents of matter is inconsistent with current physics as well.

==== Cosmic radiation ====
Every Le Sage-type model assumes the existence of a space-filling isotropic flux or radiation of enormous intensity and penetrating capability. This has some similarity to the cosmic microwave background radiation (CMBR) discovered in the 20th century. CMBR is indeed a space-filling and fairly isotropic flux, but its intensity is extremely small, as is its penetrating capability. The flux of neutrinos, emanating from (for example) the sun, possesses the penetrating properties envisaged by Le Sage for his ultramundane corpuscles, but this flux is not isotropic (since individual stars are the main sources of neutrinos) and the intensity is even less than that of the CMBR. Of course, neither the CMBR nor neutrinos propagate at superluminal speeds, which is another necessary attribute of Le Sage's particles. From a more modern point of view, discarding the simple "push" concept of Le Sage, the suggestion that the neutrino (or some other particle similar to the neutrino) might be the mediating particle in a quantum field theory of gravitation was considered and disproved by Feynman.

=== Gravitational shielding ===
P10: Gravitational shielding

Although matter is postulated to be very sparse in the Fatio–Le Sage theory, it cannot be perfectly transparent, because in that case no gravitational force would exist. However, the lack of perfect transparency leads to problems: with sufficient mass the amount of shading produced by two pieces of matter becomes less than the sum of the shading that each of them would produce separately, due to the overlap of their shadows (P10, above). This hypothetical effect, called gravitational shielding, implies that addition of matter does not result in a direct proportional increase in the gravitational mass. Therefore, in order to be viable, Fatio and Le Sage postulated that the shielding effect is so small as to be undetectable, which requires that the interaction cross-section of matter must be extremely small (P10, below). This places an extremely high lower-bound on the intensity of the flux required to produce the observed force of gravity. Any form of gravitational shielding would represent a violation of the equivalence principle, and would be inconsistent with the extremely precise null result observed in the Eötvös experiment and its successors – all of which have instead confirmed the precise equivalence of active and passive gravitational mass with inertial mass that was predicted by general relativity. For more historical information on the connection between gravitational shielding and Le Sage gravity, see Martins, and Borzeszkowski et al.

Since Isenkrahe's proposal on the connection between density, temperature and weight was based purely on the anticipated effects of changes in material density, and since temperature at a given density can be increased or decreased, Isenkrahe's comments do not imply any fundamental relation between temperature and gravitation. (There actually is a relation between temperature and gravitation, as well as between binding energy and gravitation, but these actual effects have nothing to do with Isenkrahe's proposal. See the section below on "Coupling to energy".) Regarding the prediction of a relation between gravitation and density, all experimental evidence indicates that there is no such relation.

=== Speed of gravity ===
==== Drag ====
According to Le Sage's theory, an isolated body is subjected to drag if it is in motion relative to the unique isotropic frame of the ultramundane flux (i.e., the frame in which the speed of the ultramundane corpuscles is the same in all directions). This is due to the fact that, if a body is in motion, the particles striking the body from the front have a higher speed (relative to the body) than those striking the body from behind – this effect will act to decrease the distance between the sun and the earth. The magnitude of this drag is proportional to vu, where v is the speed of the particles and u is the speed of the body, whereas the characteristic force of gravity is proportional to v^{2}, so the ratio of drag to gravitational force is proportional to u/v. Thus for a given characteristic strength of gravity, the amount of drag for a given speed u can be made arbitrarily small by increasing the speed v of the ultramundane corpuscles. However, in order to reduce the drag to an acceptable level (i.e., consistent with observation) in terms of classical mechanics, the speed v must be many orders of magnitude greater than the speed of light. This makes Le Sage theory fundamentally incompatible with the modern science of mechanics based on special relativity, according to which no particle (or wave) can exceed the speed of light. In addition, even if superluminal particles were possible, the effective temperature of such a flux would be sufficient to incinerate all ordinary matter in a fraction of a second.

==== Aberration ====
As shown by Laplace, another possible Le Sage effect is orbital aberration due to finite speed of gravity. Unless the Le Sage particles are moving at speeds much greater than the speed of light, as Le Sage and Kelvin supposed, there is a time delay in the interactions between bodies (the transit time). In the case of orbital motion this results in each body reacting to a retarded position of the other, which creates a leading force component. Contrary to the drag effect, this component will act to accelerate both objects away from each other. In order to maintain stable orbits, the effect of gravity must either propagate much faster than the speed of light or must not be a purely central force. This has been suggested by many as a conclusive disproof of any Le Sage type of theory. In contrast, general relativity is consistent with the lack of appreciable aberration identified by Laplace, because even though gravity propagates at the speed of light in general relativity, the expected aberration is almost exactly cancelled by velocity-dependent terms in the interaction.

=== Range of gravity ===
In many particle models, such as Kelvin's, the range of gravity is limited due to the nature of particle interactions amongst themselves. The range is effectively determined by the rate that the proposed internal modes of the particles can eliminate the momentum defects (shadows) that are created by passing through matter. Such predictions as to the effective range of gravity will vary and are dependent upon the specific aspects and assumptions as to the modes of interactions that are available during particle interactions. However, for this class of models the observed large-scale structure of the cosmos constrains such dispersion to those that will allow for the aggregation of such immense gravitational structures.

=== Energy ===
==== Absorption ====
As noted in the historical section, a major problem for every Le Sage model is the energy and heat issue. As Maxwell and Poincaré showed, inelastic collisions lead to a vaporization of matter within fractions of a second and the suggested solutions were not convincing. For example, Aronson gave a simple proof of Maxwell's assertion:

Suppose that, contrary to Maxwell's hypothesis, the molecules of gross matter actually possess more energy than the particles. In that case the particles would, on the average, gain energy in the collision and the particles intercepted by body B would be replaced by more energetic ones rebounding from body B. Thus the effect of gravity would be reversed: there would be a mutual repulsion between all bodies of mundane matter, contrary to observation. If, on the other hand, the average kinetic energies of the particles and of the molecules are the same, then no net transfer of energy would take place, and the collisions would be equivalent to elastic ones, which, as has been demonstrated, do not yield a gravitational force.

Likewise Isenkrahe's violation of the energy conservation law is unacceptable, and Kelvin's application of Clausius' theorem leads (as noted by Kelvin himself) to some sort of perpetual motion mechanism. The suggestion of a secondary re-radiation mechanism for wave models attracted the interest of JJ Thomson, but was not taken very seriously by either Maxwell or Poincaré, because it entails a gross violation of the second law of thermodynamics (huge amounts of energy spontaneously being converted from a colder to a hotter form), which is one of the most solidly established of all physical laws.

The energy problem has also been considered in relation to the idea of mass accretion in connection with the Expanding Earth theory. Among the early theorists to link mass increase in some sort of push gravity model to Earth expansion were Yarkovsky and Hilgenberg. The idea of mass accretion and the expanding earth theory are not currently considered to be viable by mainstream scientists. This is because, among other reasons, according to the principle of mass–energy equivalence, if the Earth was absorbing the energy of the ultramundane flux at the rate necessary to produce the observed force of gravity (i.e. by using the values calculated by Poincaré), its mass would be doubling in each fraction of a second.

==== Coupling to energy ====
Based on observational evidence, it is now known that gravity interacts with all forms of energy, and not just with mass. The electrostatic binding energy of the nucleus, the energy of weak interactions in the nucleus, and the kinetic energy of electrons in atoms, all contribute to the gravitational mass of an atom, as has been confirmed to high precision in Eötvös type experiments. This means, for example, that when the atoms of a quantity of gas are moving more rapidly, the gravitation of that gas increases. Moreover, Lunar Laser Ranging experiments have shown that even gravitational binding energy itself also gravitates, with a strength consistent with the equivalence principle to high precision – which furthermore demonstrates that any successful theory of gravitation must be nonlinear and self-coupling. Le Sage's theory does not predict any of these aforementioned effects, nor do any of the known variants of Le Sage's theory.

== Non-gravitational applications and analogies ==
=== Mock gravity ===
Lyman Spitzer in 1941 calculated, that absorption of radiation between two dust particles lead to a net attractive force which varies proportional to 1/r^{2} (evidently he was unaware of Le Sage's shadow mechanism and especially Lorentz's considerations on radiation pressure and gravity). George Gamow, who called this effect "mock gravity", proposed in 1949 that after the Big Bang the temperature of electrons dropped faster than the temperature of background radiation. Absorption of radiation lead to a Lesage mechanism between electrons, which might have had an important role in the process of galaxy formation shortly after the Big Bang. However, this proposal was disproved by Field in 1971, who showed that this effect was much too small, because electrons and background radiation were nearly in thermal equilibrium. Hogan and White proposed in 1986 that mock gravity might have influenced the formation of galaxies by absorption of pregalactic starlight. But it was shown by Wang and Field that any form of mock gravity is incapable of producing enough force to influence galaxy formation.

=== Plasma ===
The Le Sage mechanism also has been identified as a significant factor in the behavior of dusty plasma. A.M. Ignatov has shown that an attractive force arises between two dust grains suspended in an isotropic collisionless plasma due to inelastic collisions between ions of the plasma and the grains of dust. This attractive force is inversely proportional to the square of the distance between dust grains, and can counterbalance the Coulomb repulsion between dust grains.

=== Vacuum energy ===
In quantum field theory the existence of virtual particles is proposed, which lead to the so-called Casimir effect. Casimir calculated that between two plates only particles with specific wavelengths should be counted when calculating the vacuum energy. Therefore, the energy density between the plates is less if the plates are close together, leading to a net attractive force between the plates. However, the conceptual framework of this effect is very different from the theory of Fatio and Le Sage.

== Recent activity ==
The re-examination of Le Sage's theory in the 19th century identified several closely interconnected problems with the theory. These relate to excessive heating, frictional drag, shielding, and gravitational aberration. The recognition of these problems, in conjunction with a general shift away from mechanical based theories, resulted in a progressive loss of interest in Le Sage's theory. Ultimately in the 20th century Le Sage's theory was eclipsed by Einstein's theory of general relativity.

In 1965 Richard Feynman examined the Fatio/Lesage mechanism, primarily as an example of an attempt to explain a "complicated" physical law (in this case, Newton's inverse-square law of gravity) in terms of simpler primitive operations without the use of complex mathematics, and also as an example of a failed theory. He notes that the mechanism of "bouncing particles" reproduces the inverse-square force law and that "the strangeness of the mathematical relation will be very much reduced", but then remarks that the scheme "does not work", because of the drag it predicts would be experienced by moving bodies.

There are occasional attempts to re-habilitate the theory outside the mainstream, including those of Radzievskii and Kagalnikova (1960), Shneiderov (1961), Buonomano and Engels (1976), Adamut (1982), Popescu (1982), Jaakkola (1996), Tom Van Flandern (1999), and Edwards (2014).

A variety of Le Sage models and related topics are discussed in Edwards, et al.

== Secondary sources ==
- Aronson, S. (1964), "The gravitational theory of Georges-Louis Le Sage", The Natural Philosopher, 3: 51–74, archived from the original on 2006-03-05
- Bellone, E. (1991), "Classic and non-intentional consequences of some newtonian problems", Mem. Società Astronomica Italiana, 62 (3): 477–485, Bibcode:1991MmSAI..62..477B
- Borzeszkowski, H.-H.; Chrobok, T.; Treder, H.-J. (2004), "Screening and Absorption of Gravitation in Pre-Relativistic and Relativistic Theories", in G. T. Gillies; V. N. Melnikov; V. de Sabbata (eds.), The Gravitational Constant: Generalized Gravitational Theories and Experiments, pp. 1–37, arXiv:gr-qc/0310081, Bibcode:2004grco.book....1V, doi:10.1007/978-1-4020-2242-5_1, ISBN 978-1-4020-1956-2, S2CID 15717897
- Chabot, H. (2004), "Nombre et approximations dans la théorie de la gravitation de Lesage" (PDF), Actes des Journées de Peirescq "La pensée numérique", Sciences et Techniques en Perspective, 2e série, 8: 179–198, archived from the original (PDF) on 2017-04-24
- Corry, L. (1999), "David Hilbert between Mechanical and Electromagnetic Reductionism" (PDF), Archive for History of Exact Sciences, 53 (6): 489–527, doi:10.1007/s004070050005, S2CID 126213840
- Drude, Paul (1897), "Ueber Fernewirkungen", Annalen der Physik, 298 (12): I–XLIX, Bibcode:1897AnP...298D...1D, doi:10.1002/andp.18972981220
- Evans, J. C. (2002), "Gravity in the century of light: sources, construction and reception of Le Sage's theory of gravitation", in Edwards, M.R. (ed.), Pushing Gravity: New Perspectives on Le Sage's Theory of Gravitation, Montreal: C. Roy Keys Inc., pp. 9–40
- Martins, de Andrade, R. (1999), "The search for gravitational absorption in the early 20th century", in Goemmer, H.; Renn, J.; Ritter, J. (eds.), The Expanding Worlds of General Relativity (Einstein Studies), vol. 7, Boston: Birkhäuser, pp. 3–44, archived from the original on 2010-08-09
- Martins, de Andrade, R. (2002), "Gravitational absorption according to the hypotheses of Le Sage and Majorana", in Edwards, M.R. (ed.), Pushing Gravity: New Perspectives on Le Sage's Theory of Gravitation (PDF), Montreal: C. Roy Keys Inc., pp. 239–258, archived from the original (PDF) on 2004-07-25
- Playfair, J. (1807), "Notice de la Vie et des Ecrits de George Louis Le Sage", Edinburgh Review: 137–153 English summary of Prévost (1805).
- Prévost, P., ed. (1805), Notice de la Vie et des Ecrits de George Louis Le Sage, Geneva & Paris: J.J. Paschoud
- Rowlinson, J. S. (2003), "Le Sage's Essai de Chymie Méchanique", Notes Rec. R. Soc. Lond., 57 (1): 35–45, doi:10.1098/rsnr.2003.0195, S2CID 143329532
- Taylor, W. B. (1876), "Kinetic Theories of Gravitation", Annual Report of the Smithsonian Institution, 31: 205–282
- Wolf, R. (1862), "George-Louis Le Sage", Biographien zur Kulturgeschichte der Schweiz, 4, Orell, Füssli & co.: 173–192
- Zehe, H. (1980), Die Gravitationstheorie des Nicolas Fatio de Duillier, Hildesheim: Gerstenberg, ISBN 3-8067-0862-2
- Zenneck, J. (1903), "Gravitation", Encyklopädie der Mathematischen Wissenschaften mit Einschluss ihrer Anwendungen, vol. 5, Leipzig, pp. 25–67, doi:10.1007/978-3-663-16016-8_2, ISBN 978-3-663-15445-7
