= Samuel Preston =

Samuel Preston is the name of:

- Samuel W. Preston (1840–1865), American naval officer
- Samuel Preston (mayor) (1665–1743), mayor of colonial Philadelphia
- Preston (singer) (born 1982), British pop performer
- Samuel H. Preston (born 1943), American sociologist
- Samuel Tolver Preston (1844–1917), English engineer and physicist
