= Caspar Isenkrahe =

German mathematician, physicist and Catholic philosopher of nature (1844 – 1921)

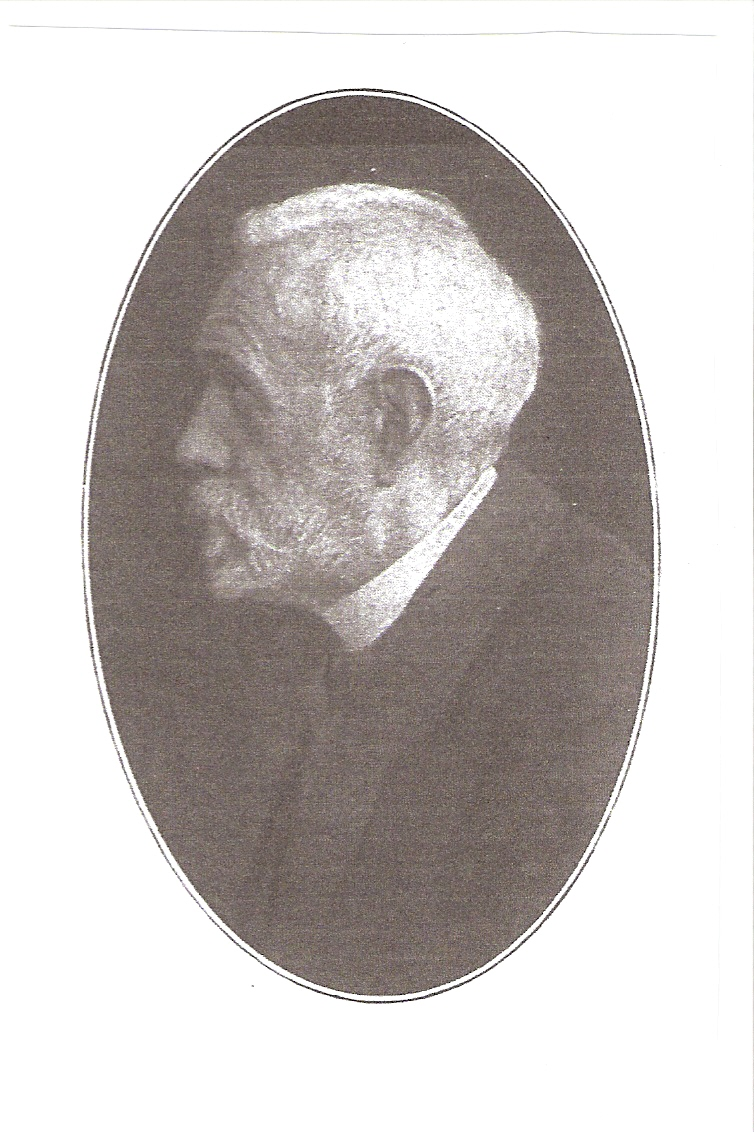
Caspar Isenkrahe

Mathias Caspar Hubert Isenkrahe (12 May 1844 in Müntz, Rhine Province – 12 August 1921 in Trier) was a German mathematician, physicist and Catholic philosopher of nature.

== Life ==
Isenkrahe's father died before Caspar's birth. Isenkrahe visited in 1856 the Progymnasium in Jülich, in 1857 the Marzellengymnasium in Cologne and from 1858 to 1863 the Realprogymnasium in Bonn. In 1868 he studied at the University of Bonn where he chose the subjects mathematics, physics, chemistry, mineralogy, botany, zoology, philosophy, Latin and German. On 31 July 1866 he made his PhD with an award-winning work about the anatomy of Helicina titanica, a species of snail. He became a teaching authority as a senior primary school teacher (pro facultate docendi) on 26 February 1869 for his chosen courses.

After a probationary year 1869–1870 at the high school of Bonn, he worked at the high school of Krefeld (at least to 1878) and then at the Realprogymnasium in Bonn. Trying to change to a high school career at the mathematical faculty at the University of Bonn, he sent a habilitation document. The faculty approved his plan but it failed because of the Berlin government for reasons unconnected with the subject. A later attempt to receive a lectureship at the technical University of Braunschweig also failed. From 1893 to 1911 he was working as a high school professor at Trier until his retirement.

Until his death in 1921 he was actively engaged in the fields of mathematics, physics and natural philosophy. He corresponded with well-known mathematicians and physicists, such as Hermann von Helmholtz, Heinrich Hertz, Felix Klein and Philipp Lenard.

Because of his unusual scientific creativity and versatility, the philosophical faculty of the University of Bonn honored him demonstratively on the occasion of his golden doctoral anniversary with the renewal of his doctoral dignity on 31 July 1916. Caspar Isenkrahe died after serious physical sufferings on 12 August 1921.

His legacy is kept safe in Trier (with part in the town archives and the rest in the diocese archives). The partial papers I (size: 0.5 meters) in the town archives of Trier includes correspondences, poems, clay creations, manuscripts as well as different collections from the cultural life around the time of the turn of 19th to the 20th century. The partial papers II (size: 2.50 meters) in the diocese archives includes personal documents, works, a biography as well as additional correspondence.

== Work ==
Isenkrahe always had a special inclination towards mathematics and produced a row of publications in the field of abstract mathematics. In particular his works around the theory of the prime numbers were appreciated.

The question of infinity fascinated him in the field of the Philosophy of nature.

As a physicist, Isenkrahe criticised the theories of gravitation of his time. Based on a Le Sage type model, which he developed independently, he presented an explanation of the phenomenon of gravity which was noticed by well-known physicists like Paul Drude, Walter Ritz and Arnold Sommerfeld.

As educationalist and religious Roman Catholic he felt obliged to give a proof of the existence of God on a natural philosophical basis. He also considered it to be necessary to examine the paranormal phenomena which were issued by the Roman Catholic Church as a 'miracle'. He dealt increasingly with experimental theology later.

In a book written in 1921 he tried to mediate in the debate around the theory of relativity, which had partly been led by both sides by scientifically inadmissible means.

== Bibliography ==
- „Anatomie von Helicina titanica“, Archiv für Naturgeschichte XXXIII, 1. Heft, 50 – 72 (1867).
- „Schul-Experimente am Harmonium zum Beweis der wichtigsten Lehrsätze der Akustik“, Zeitschrift für mathematischen und naturwissenschaftlichen Unterricht IX, 178 – 184 (1878).
- Isaac Newton und die Gegner seiner Gravitationstheorie unter den modernen Naturphilosophen, Wissenschaftliche Beilage zum Jahresbericht des Gymnasiums in Krefeld, Krefeld, Ostern 1878 (39 S.).
- Das Räthsel von der Schwerkraft. Kritik der bisherigen Lösungen des Gravitationsproblems und Versuch einer neuen auf rein mechanischer Grundlage, Braunschweig 1879 (214 S.)
- „Kritische Beitäge zum Gravitationsproblem“, Gaea XVI, 472 – 480, 544 – 550, 600 – 607, 647 – 656, 745 – 751 (1880).
- „Pendelexperimente zur Erklärung der Consonanz-, Interferenz- und Absorptions-Erscheinungen in der Akustik und Optik“, Repertorium für Experimentalphysik XVI, 99 – 108 (1980); zwei Nachträge dazu im selben Band: S. 516 – 520 und 521 – 524.
- „Euler's Theorie von der Ursache der Gravitation", Zeitschrift für Mathematik und Physik 26, Heft 1, 1 – 19 (1881) (Hist.-literar. Abteilung).
- Idealismus und Realismus, Eine erkenntnistheoretische Studie zur Begründung des letzteren, Leipzig 1883.
- „Ueber Schmitz Dumonts Schrift ‚Die Einheit dere Naturkräfte und die Deutung ihrer gemeinsamen Formel‘ “, Zeitschrift für Mathematik und Physik 28, Nr. 2, 44 – 45 (1883) (Histor.-literar. Abteilung).
- „Ueber die Inversion der vollständigen elliptischen Integrale erster Gattung für ihre reellen Moduln“, Zeitschrift für Mathematik und Physik XXXI, 34 – 43 (1886).
- „Ueber die Inversion der von Legendre definirten vollständigen elliptischen Integrale zweiter Gattung für ihre reellen Moduln“, Zeitschrift für Mathematik und Physik XXXI, 178 – 191 (1886).
- „Inversion des von Weierstraß definirten vollständigen elliptischen Integrale zweiter Gattung“, Zeitschrift für Mathematik und Physik XXXI, 241 – 246 (1886).
- Zur Theorie der elliptischen Modulfunctionen, Wissenschaftliche Beilage zum Jahresbericht des Realprogymnasiums in Bonn, Bonn 1886 (35 S.).
- Ueber die Anwendung iterirter Functionen zur Darstellung der Wurzeln algebraischer und transcendenter Gleichungen, Mathematische Annalen XXXI, 3. Heft, 309 – 317 (1888).
- Ueber die Fernkraft und das durch Paul du Bois-Reymond aufgestellte dritte Ignorabimus, Leipzig 1989 (64 S.).
- Über die Zurückführung der Schwere auf Absorption und die daraus abgeleiteten Gesetze, Abhandlungen zur Geschichte der Mathematik, VI. Heft, 161 – 204, Leipzig 1892.
- Das Verfahren der Funktionswiederholung. Seine geometrische Veranschaulichung und algebraische Anwendung, Wissenschaftliche Beilage zum Jahresbericht des Kgl. Kaiser-Wilhelms-Gymnasiums in Trier, Trier 1897 (113 S.).
- Über eine Lösung der Aufgabe, jede Primzahl als Function der vorhergehenden Primzahlen durch einen geschlossenen Ausdruck darzustellen, Mathematische Annalen 53, 1. – 2. Heft, 42 – 44, April 6, 1900.
- „Neue Lehrsätze über die Wurzeln algebraischer Gleichungen“, Archiv der Mathematik und Physik, III. Reihe, 3. Band, 257 – 260 (1902).
- Ueber die 32 Lösungsergebnisse des erweiterten Malfattischen Problems, Wissenschaftliche Beilage zum Jahresbericht des Kgl. Kaiser-Wilhelms-Gymnasiums in Trier, Trier, Ostern 1906.
- „Ueber die Terminologie des Endlichen und Unendlichen“, Natur und Offenbarung 54, 129 – 156 (III. Heft, 14. März), 201 – 228 (IV. Heft, 14. April) (1908).
- „Ueber mechanische und optische Vorrichtungen, die zum Beweis für die Endlichkeit der Welt verwendet werden“, Natur und Offenbarung 55, IV. Heft, 15. April, 193 – 211 (1909).
- Über Begriffe und Grundsätze, die beim kosmologischen Beweise als bekannt und selbstverständlich vorausgesetzt werden, Wissenschaftliche Beilage zum Jahresbericht 1908–09 des Königlichen Kaiser Wilhelms-Gymnasiums in Trier, Trier 1909 (95 S.). Diese Abhandlung Isenkrahes wurde kommentiert von C. Dessoulavy, Mind: A Quarterly Review of Philosophy XXII, 592 – 595 (1910).
- Neapolitanische Blutwunder, Regensburg/Mainz 1912.
- „Ueber nicht restfrei abzählbare Mengen“, Monatsblätter für den katholischen Religionsunterricht an höheren Lehranstalten XII, Januar, 8 – 19 (1911).
- „Ueber die Absorption der Schwerkraft“, Die Naturwissenschaften, 1. Jahrgang 1913, Heft 50, 12. Dezember, 1237 – 1238.
- „Über den Zusammenhang der sogenanten Ätherstoßtheorie mit einigen Sonderfragen der kosmischen Physik“, Die Naturwissenschaften 3, Nr. 38, September 1915.
- Über die Grundlegung eines bündigen kosmologischen Gottesbeweises, Kempten/München 1915.
- Das Endliche und das Unendliche. Schärfung beider Begriffe, Erörterung vieler Streitfragen und Beweisführungen, in denen sie Verwendung finden, Münster 1915.
- Energie, Entropie, Weltanfang und Weltende, Trier 1916.
- „Über die Begriffe: Grenze, Anfang und Ende“, Philosophisches Jahrbuch der Görresgesellschaft 29, 3. Heft, 213 – 327 (1916).
- Zum Problem der Evidenz. Was bedeutet, was leistet sie?, München 1917.
- Untersuchungen über das Endliche und das Unendliche: Die Lehre des hl. Thomas vom Unendlichen, ihre Auslegung durch Prof. Langenberg und ihr Verhältnis zur neuzeitlichen Mathematik, Bonn 1920.
- Zur Elementaranalyse der Relativitätstheorie. Einleitung und Vorstufen, Braunschweig 1921.
- Waffen der Apolegetik und ihre Handhabung, Bonn 1922.
- Experimental-Theologie. Behandelt vom Standpunkte eines Naturforschers, 2. umgearbeitete und erweiterte Auflage, Bonn 1922.

== Books on Isenkrahe ==
- Wilhelm Bers (1944) „Professor Dr. phil. Caspar Isenkrahe aus Müntz bei Jülich – (1844–1921) “, Rur-Blumen 23, Nr. 16, Seiten 61 – 62.
- Wilhelm Alfred Miller, Isenkrahe-Bibliographie, 3. ergänzte Aufl., Berlin/Leipzig 1927.
- Adalbert Michael Bock, Die Theorie von Isenkrahe in ihrer Anwendung auf die Anziehung und Bewegung der Himmelskörper (Dissertation), München 1891.
