= Jean Christophe Fatio =

Genevan politician, engineer and natural philosopher (1656–1720)

- Born: 17 November 1656
- Died: 18 October 1720 (aged 63); Geneva, Republic of Geneva
- Occupation(s): Engineer, politician, natural philosopher
- Family: Nicolas Fatio (brother)

Jean-Christophe Fatio de Duillier (17 November 1656 – 18 October 1720) was a Genevan engineer, mathematician, politician, and natural philosopher who became a fellow of the Royal Society of London in 1706. He was the elder brother of the mathematician and inventor Nicolas Fatio de Duillier.

Fatio was the military engineer in charge of the fortifications of the city of Geneva and, in 1685–1686, carried out a triangulation that led to a more precise map of Lake Geneva. His astronomical observations, carried out at the family's estate in Duillier, allowed the French astronomer Jacques Cassini to calculate the precise difference in longitude between Paris and Geneva. Fatio was also known for his observations of the seiches of Lake Geneva, which are characterized by a periodic sloshing of the water in the pattern of a standing wave. In 1688 he was elected as a member of the Grand Council of Geneva (the "Council of Two Hundred").

In 1704, Jacob Bernoulli reported to Gottfried Leibniz that Jean-Christophe Fatio had invented a method for accelerating the convergence of an alternating series. This is an early instance of what later came to be called "Euler's transformation", after the Swiss mathematician Leonhard Euler.

Jean-Cristophe eventually followed his brother Nicolas to London, where he was elected to the Royal Society on 3 April 1706. Jean-Christophe observed the total solar eclipse of May 12, 1706 from Geneva and then published a report of his findings in the Philosophical Transactions.

Fatio was married in 1709 to Catherine, daughter of Jean Gassand of Forcalquier, in Provence. He died in Geneva in 1720. He left no issue and was survived by his wife, whose will was proved at London in March 1752.
