= Moritz Cantor =

German historian of mathematics

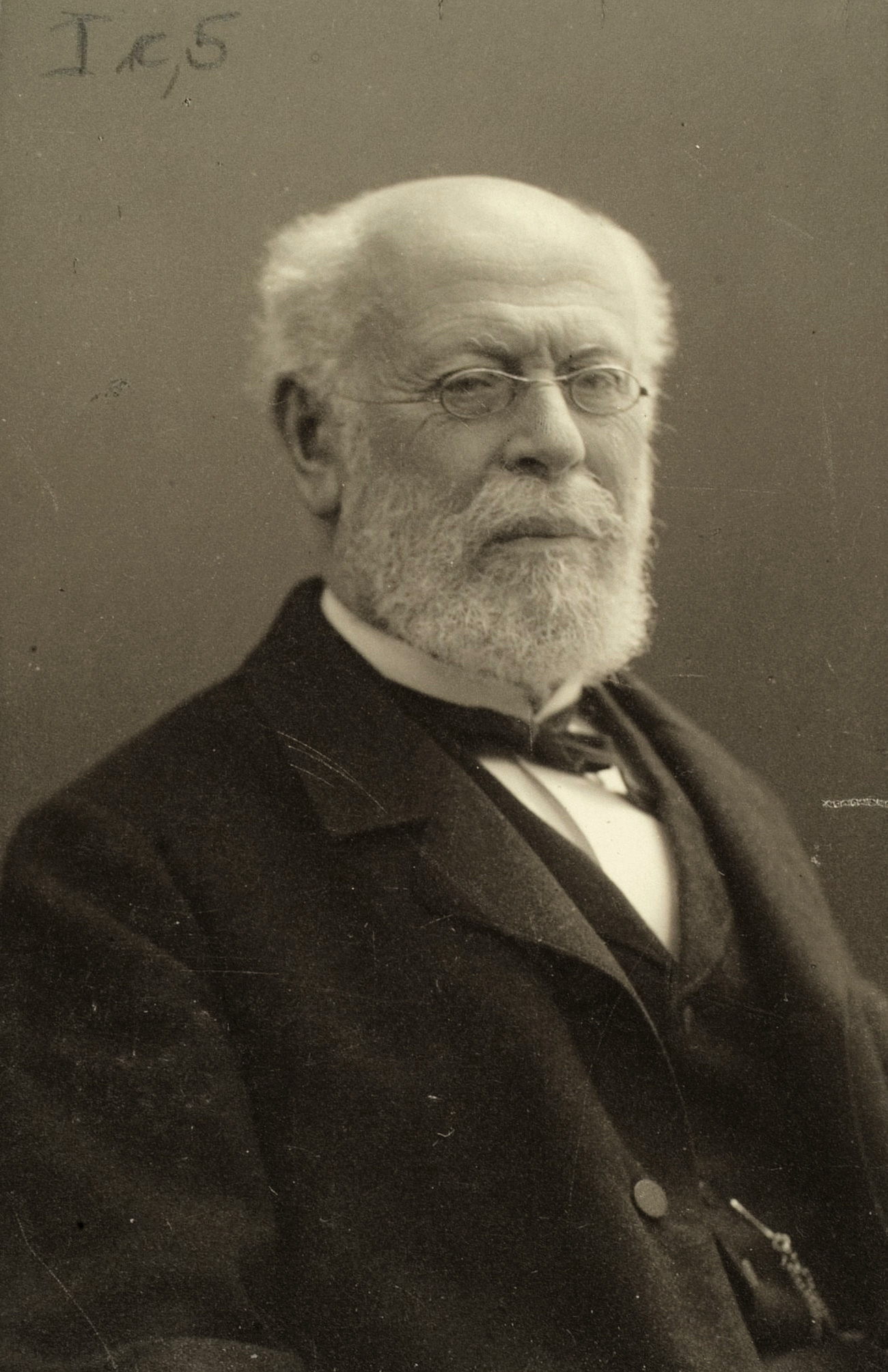
- Moritz Cantor
- Born: 23 August 1829; Mannheim, Grand Duchy of Baden
- Died: 10 April 1920 (aged 90); Heidelberg, Germany
- Education: University of Heidelberg
- Scientific career
- Fields: History of mathematics
- Doctoral students: Karl Bopp

Moritz Benedikt Cantor (23 August 1829 – 10 April 1920) was a German historian of mathematics.

== Biography ==
Cantor was born at Mannheim. He came from a Sephardi Jewish family that had emigrated to the Netherlands from Portugal, another branch of which had established itself in Russia. In his early youth, Moritz Cantor was not strong enough to go to school, and his parents decided to educate him at home. Later, however, he was admitted to an advanced class of the Gymnasium in Mannheim. From there he went to the University of Heidelberg in 1848, and soon after to the University of Göttingen, where he studied under Gauss and Weber, and where Stern awakened in him a strong interest in historical research.

After obtaining his PhD at the University of Heidelberg in 1851, he went to Berlin, where he eagerly followed the lectures of Peter Gustav Lejeune Dirichlet; and upon his return to Heidelberg in 1853, he was appointed privat-docent at the university. In 1863, he was promoted to the position of assistant professor, and in 1877 he became honorary professor.

Cantor was one of the founders of the Kritische Zeitschrift für Chemie, Physik und Mathematik. In 1859 he became associated with Schlömilch as editor of the Zeitschrift für Mathematik und Physik, taking charge of the historical and literary section. Since 1877, through his efforts, a supplement to the Zeitschrift was published under the separate title of Abhandlungen zur Geschichte der Mathematik.

Cantor's inaugural dissertation, "Über ein weniger gebräuchliches Coordinaten-System" (1851), gave no indication that the history of exact sciences would soon be enriched by a master work by him. His first important work was "Über die Einführung unserer gegenwärtigen Ziffern in Europa", which he wrote for the Zeitschrift für Mathematik und Physik, 1856, vol. i.

His greatest work was Vorlesungen über Geschichte der Mathematik. This comprehensive history of mathematics appeared as follows:

- Volume 1 (1880)—From the earliest times until 1200
  - 1st Edition, 1880
  - 2nd Ed., 1894
  - 3rd Ed., 1907
- Volume 2 (1892)—From 1200 to 1668
  - 1st Ed., 1892
  - 2nd Ed., 1900
- Volume 3 (1894–1896)—From 1668 to 1758
  - 1st Ed., 1898
  - 2nd Ed., 1901
- Volume 4 (1908) (with nine collaborators, Cantor as editor)—From 1759 to 1799
  - "History of mathematics from 1759 to 1799," by Siegmund Günther (1848–1923)
  - "Arithmetic," "Algebra," "Number theory," by Florian Cajori (1859–1930)
  - "Combinatorics," "Probability calculations," "Series," "Imaginaries," by Eugen Netto (1846–1919)
  - "Elementary Geometry," by Viktor Bobynin (1848–1919)
  - "Trigonometry," "Polygonometry," "Tables," by Anton von Braunmühl (1853–1908)
  - "Analytic geometry of the plane and space," by Viktor Kommerell (1866–1948)
  - "Perspective and descriptive geometry," by Gino Loria (1862–1954)
  - "Infinitesimal Calculus," by Giulio Vivanti (1859–1949)
  - "Total and partial differential equations," "Difference and sum calculations," "Calculus of variations," by Carl Raimund Wallner (1881–1934)
  - "Overview of the period from 1758 to 1799," by Moritz Cantor

Many historians credit him for founding a new discipline in a field that had hitherto lacked the sound, conscientious, and critical methods of other fields of history.

In 1900 Moritz Cantor received the honor of giving a plenary address at the International Congress of Mathematicians in Paris (Sur l'historiographie des mathématiques). In 1970, Cantor crater on the Moon was named after him and Georg Cantor.

== Sources ==
- Jewish Encyclopedia, 1906
