= Nicolas Fatio de Duillier =

Mathematician, natural philosopher and astronomer (1664–1753)

Nicolas Fatio de Duillier FRS
- Portrait by an unknown artist, in the collection of the Bibliothèque de Genève
- Born: Nicolas Fatio; 26 February 1664; Basel, Swiss Confederacy
- Died: 10 May 1753 (aged 89); Madresfield, Worcestershire, England
- Other names: Nicolas Faccio; Nicolas Facio
- Citizenship: Genevan
- Education: University of Geneva
- Known for: Zodiacal light, Le Sage's theory of gravitation, integrating factor, jewel bearing
- Scientific career
- Fields: Mathematics, astronomy, physics, watchmaking
- Academic advisors: Jean-Robert Chouet

Nicolas Fatio de Duillier (Note: French: [nikɔla fasjo də dɥije]) FRS (also spelled Faccio or Facio; 16 February 1664 – 10 May 1753) was a Genevan mathematician, natural philosopher, astronomer, inventor, and religious campaigner. Born in Basel, Switzerland, Fatio mostly grew up in the then-independent Republic of Geneva, of which he was a citizen, before spending much of his adult life in England and Holland. Fatio is known for his collaboration with Giovanni Domenico Cassini on the correct explanation of the astronomical phenomenon of zodiacal light, for his "push" or "shadow" theory of gravitation, for inventing the integrating factor as a method for solving ordinary differential equations, for his close association with both Christiaan Huygens and Isaac Newton, and for his role in the Leibniz–Newton calculus controversy. He also invented and developed the first method for fabricating jewel bearings for mechanical watches and clocks.

Elected a Fellow of the Royal Society of London at the age of 24, Fatio never achieved the position and reputation that his early achievements and connections had promised. In 1706 he became involved with a millenarian religious sect, known in London as the "French prophets", and the following year he was sentenced to the pillory for sedition over his role in the publication of the prophecies of Élie Marion, the leader of that sect. Fatio travelled with the French prophets as a missionary, going as far as Smyrna before returning to Holland in 1713, and finally settling in England. His extreme religious views harmed his intellectual reputation, but Fatio continued to pursue technological, scientific, and theological researches until his death at the age of 89.

== Early life ==
=== Family background ===
Nicolas Fatio was born in Basel, Switzerland, in 1664, into a family that originated in Italy and settled in Switzerland following the Protestant Reformation. One of his cousins was the ill-fated Genevan political reformer Pierre Fatio. Nicolas was the seventh of fourteen children (six brothers and eight sisters) of Jean-Baptiste and Cathérine Fatio, née Barbaud. Jean-Baptiste had inherited a significant fortune, derived from his father in law's interests in iron and silver mining, and in 1672 he moved the family to an estate that he had purchased in Duillier, some twenty kilometres from the town of Geneva. Jean-Baptiste, a devout Calvinist, wished Nicolas to become a pastor, whereas Cathérine, a Lutheran, wanted him to find a place in the court of a Protestant German prince. Instead, the young Nicolas pursued a scientific career.

Nicolas's elder brother, Jean Christophe Fatio, was elected a Fellow of the Royal Society on 3 April 1706. He was married in 1709 to Catherine, daughter of Jean Gassand of Forcalquier, in Provence, and died at Geneva on 18 October 1720. Catherine's will was proved at London in March 1752. Nicolas himself was never married.

=== Education and patronage ===
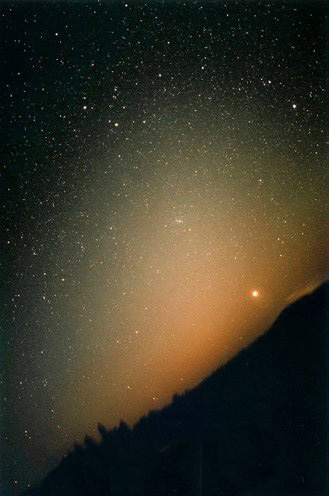
Zodiacal light in the eastern sky, before dawn twilight.

Nicolas Fatio received his elementary schooling at the Collège de Genève, proceeding in 1678 to the Académie de Genève (now the University of Geneva), where he remained until 1680. At the Académie he came under the influence of the rector, Jean-Robert Chouet, a prominent Cartesian. Before he was eighteen, Fatio wrote to the director of the Paris Observatory, the astronomer Giovanni Domenico Cassini, suggesting a new method of determining the distances to the Sun and Moon from the Earth, as well as an explanation of the form of the rings of Saturn. With Chouet's support, Fatio travelled to Paris in the spring of 1682 and was welcomed received by Cassini.

That same year, Cassini presented his findings on the astronomical phenomenon of zodiacal light. Fatio repeated Cassini's observations in Geneva in 1684, and in 1685 he offered an important development of Cassini's theory, which was communicated by Chouet in the March 1685 number of Nouvelles de la république des lettres. Fatio's own Lettre à M. Cassini touchant une lumière extraordinaire qui paroît dans le Ciel depuis quelques années ("Letter to Mr. Cassini concerning the extraordinary light that has appeared in the Heavens for some years") was published in Amsterdam in 1686. There Fatio correctly explained the zodiacal light as sunlight scattered by an interplanetary dust cloud (the "zodiacal cloud") that straddles the ecliptic plane.

Fatio then studied the dilatation and contraction of the eye's pupil. He described the fibres of the anterior uvea and the choroid in a letter to Edme Mariotte, dated 13 April 1684. That same year he published an article in the Journal des sçavans on how to improve the fabrication of lenses for the objectives of telescopes.

Also in 1684, Fatio met the Piedmontese Count Fenil, who, having offended the Duke of Savoy and the King of France, had taken refuge in the house of Fatio's maternal grandfather in Alsace and then at Duillier. Fenil confided to Fatio his plan to stage a raid on the beach at Scheveningen to kidnap the Dutch Prince William of Orange. Fenil showed Fatio a letter from the Marquis de Louvois, the French Secretary of State, approving of the kidnapping, offering the king's pardon as recompense for the successful completion of the operation, and enclosing an order for money. Fatio betrayed Fenil's plot to Gilbert Burnet, whom he then accompanied to Holland in 1686 to warn Prince William.

== Career in Holland and England ==
In Holland, Fatio met Christiaan Huygens in 1682–1683, with whom he began to collaborate on mathematical problems concerning the new infinitesimal calculus. Encouraged by Huygens, Fatio compiled a list of corrections to the published works on differentiation by Ehrenfried Walther von Tschirnhaus. The Dutch authorities wished to reward Fatio, whose mathematical abilities Huygens vouched for, with a professorship. While those plans were delayed, Fatio received permission to visit England in the spring of 1687.

Fatio arrived in England in June 1687, carrying with him the conviction that the two greatest living natural philosophers were Robert Boyle, "for the details of his experiments concerning earthly bodies", and Christiaan Huygens "for physics in general, above all in those areas in which it is involved with mathematics." Fatio hoped to procure Boyle's patronage, and in London he soon made the acquaintance of John Wallis, John Locke, Richard Hampden, and his son John Hampden, among other important figures connected with the Whig party.

Fatio worked out new solutions of the "inverse tangent problem" (i.e., the solution of ordinary differential equations) and was introduced to the Royal Society by Henri Justel. He began to attend Society's meetings in June of that year, when he wrote to Huygens relaying rumours about the upcoming publication by the Society of Isaac Newton's Principia Mathematica. In that letter, Fatio mentions that he had been reproached by several fellows of the Society for "being too Cartesian, and made me to understand that, following the meditations of [Newton], all physics had been completely altered." In the winter of 1687 Fatio went to the University of Oxford, where he collaborated with Edward Bernard, the Savilian Professor of Astronomy, in an investigation into the units of measurement used in the ancient world. Fatio also learned after Abraham de Moivre for a month after he acquainted him through Mr. de Manneville.

=== Participation in the Royal Society ===
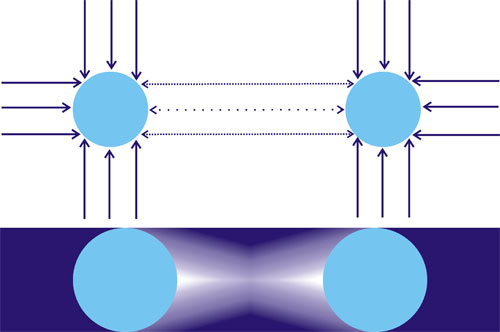
Fatio's "push-shadow" explanation of gravity: the shadows that two nearby bulky bodies make in the omnidirectional stream of aetherial corpuscles cause an imbalance in the net forces that each bulky body is subject to, leading to their mutual attraction.

Aged only 24, Fatio was elected fellow of the Royal Society on 2 May 1688. That year, Fatio gave an account of Huygens's mechanical explanation of gravitation before the Royal Society, in which he tried to connect Huygens' theory with Newton's work on universal gravitation. Fatio's personal prospects seemed to brighten even further as a result of the Glorious Revolution of 1688–9, which marked the ascendancy of the Whigs and culminated with Parliament deposing the Catholic King James II and giving the English throne jointly to James's Protestant daughter Mary and to her husband, the Dutch Prince William of Orange. Fatio also had an opportunity to enhance his intellectual reputation during Huygens' visit to London in the summer of 1689.

Fatio met Newton, probably for the first time, at a meeting of the Royal Society on 12 June 1689. On 10 July, Fatio accompanied Newton, Huygens, and John Hampden to an audience with the new King. That audience was intended to promote Newton's appointment as provost of King's College, Cambridge, an initiative by Hampden that was not successful. Newton and Fatio soon became friends and Newton even suggested that the two share rooms in London while Newton attended the post-Revolutionary session of Parliament, to which he had been elected in the election of 1689 as member for the University of Cambridge.

=== Collaborations with Huygens and Newton ===
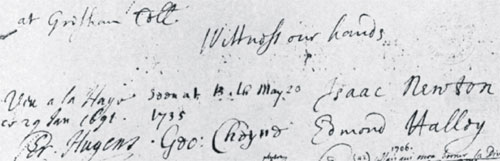
Signatures of Isaac Newton, Edmond Halley, Christiaan Huygens, and George Cheyne on Fatio's manuscript describing his push-shadow explanation of gravity.

In 1690, Fatio wrote to Huygens outlining his own understanding of the physical cause of gravity, which would later become known as "Le Sage's theory of gravitation". Soon after that, he read his letter to Huygens before the Royal Society. Fatio's theory, on which he continued to work until his death, is based on minute particles streaming through space and pushing upon gross bodies, an idea that Fatio probably derived in part from his successful explanation of zodiacal light as sunlight scattered by a cloud of fine dust surrounding the Sun.

Fatio compiled a list of errata to Newton's Principia. Among these was a correction to book II, proposition 36, on the efflux of an ideal fluid through a hole at the bottom of a cylindrical vessel, in which Newton's had obtained a result inconsistent with Torricelli's law. Fatio was able to change Newton's mind with the aid of an experiment, and he shared Newton's amended proposition with Huygens.

Fatio then turned down Newton's offer to reside in Cambridge as his assistant, seeking instead academic preferment in the Netherlands. In the spring of 1690 he went to The Hague as tutor to two of John Hampden's nephews. There, he collaborated with Huygens on problems relating to differential equations, gravity, and optics. At this time, Huygens shared with Gottfried Leibniz some of Fatio's work on differential equations. After one of his pupils died, Fatio returned to London in September 1691. He vied unsuccessfully for the Savilian Professorship of Astronomy at Oxford, a post recently vacated by his friend Edward Bernard. That chair, which was also sought by Edmond Halley, finally went to David Gregory, who had Newton's support.

In February 1691, Fatio exchanged several letters with Huygens in which Fatio revealed his invention of the method of the integrating factor to solve certain ordinary differential equation. Huygens, in turn, communicated Fatio's method to Leibniz. Fatio later communicated that method to Newton, who included it in his treatise De quadratura curvarum ("On the quadrature of curves"), published years later as an appendix to the Opticks (1704). There, Newton credited Fatio with the method, which consists of multiplying an equation of the form

$$f_1(x,y) \dot x + f_2 (x,y) \dot y = 0$$

by a factor of $x^a y^b$ to give a new equation

$$M(x,y) \dot x + N(x,y) \dot y = 0$$.

If the exponents $a$ and $b$ can be chosen so that $\partial M / \partial y = \partial N / \partial x$, then the solution to the equation can be expressed as

$\int M(x,y) \, d x = \hbox{const.}$

Fatio initially hoped to collaborate with Newton on a new edition of the Principia that would incorporate Fatio's mechanical explanation of gravity. By the end of 1691, Fatio realised that Newton would not proceed with that project, but he still hoped to collaborate with Newton on corrections to the text of the Principia. In a letter to Huygens, Fatio wrote, concerning those corrections, "I may possibly undertake it myself, as I know no one who so well and thoroughly understands a good part of this book as I do."

== Role in Newton's quarrel with Leibniz ==
As a result of reading Newton's De quadratura curvarum, Fatio became convinced that Newton had for some time had a complete understanding of the differential and integral calculus, rendering Fatio's own mathematical discoveries superfluous. He reported as much to Huygens in 1692. In 1696, Johann Bernoulli, a close ally of Leibniz, posed the brachistochrone problem as a challenge to the mathematicians who claimed to understand the new calculus. The problem was solved by Leibniz, Tschirnhaus, L'Hôpital, Jacob Bernoulli, and Newton. In 1699, Fatio published Lineæ brevissimæ descensus investigatio geometrica duplex, cui addita est investigatio geometrica solidi rotundi in quo minima fiat resistentia ("A two-fold geometrical investigation of the line of briefest descent, to which is added a geometric investigation of the solid of revolution that produces the minimum resistance"), a pamphlet containing his own solutions to the brachistochrone and to another problem, treated by Newton in book II of the Principia (see Newton's minimal resistance problem), in what is now called the "calculus of variations".

In his book, Fatio drew attention to his own original work on the calculus from 1687, while stressing Newton's absolute priority and questioning the claims of Leibniz and his followers.

I recognize that Newton was the first and by many years the most senior inventor of this calculus: whether Leibniz, the second inventor, borrowed anything from him, I prefer that the judgment be not mine, but theirs who have seen Newton's letters and his other manuscripts. Nor will the silence of the more modest Newton, or the active exertions of Leibniz in everywhere ascribing the invention of the calculus to himself, impose upon any person who examines these papers as I have done.

— Fatio, Lineæ brevissimæ (1699), p. 18

This provoked angry responses from Johann Bernoulli and Leibniz in the Acta Eruditorum. Leibniz stressed that Newton himself had admitted in his Principia to Leibniz's independent discovery of the calculus. Fatio's reply to his critics was finally published, in abbreviated form, in 1701. Fatio's writings on the history of the calculus are often cited as precursors to the bitter priority dispute that would erupt between Newton and Leibniz in the 1710s, after the Scottish mathematician John Keill effectively accused Leibniz of plagiarism.

During this period Fatio also corresponded on the history of calculus and on his own theory of gravity with Jacob Bernoulli, who was estranged from his younger brother Johann in part because Jacob had embraced Newtonian physics, whereas Johann was a Leibnizian partisan. In 1700, Jacob Bernoulli wrote to Fatio expressing his dissatisfaction with the responses that Johann Bernoulli and Leibniz had made to Fatio's Lineæ brevissimæ. Jacob passed some of Fatio's letters to Otto Mencke, the editor of the Acta Eruditorum, anonymously. He also urged Fatio to persuade his "English friend" (i.e., Newton) to publish a solution to the isoperimetric problem as a corrective against Johann's self-conceit. When Jacob's Analysin magni problematis isoperimetrici appeared in print in March 1701, the author called upon I'Hôpital, Leibniz, Newton, and Fatio to be the judges of his work. The last letter from Jacob Bernoulli to Fatio is dated 15 August 1701. The correspondence between the two men then ceased, perhaps because of Jacob's election to the Berlin Academy, which had been established by Leibniz.

== Alchemy ==
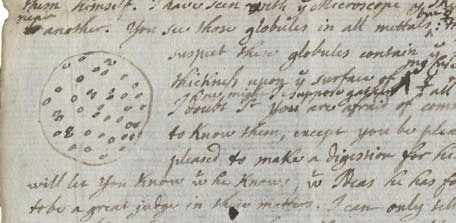
Detail from a letter by Fatio to Newton, dated 24 June 1693. Here Fatio describes "the skin which is upon mercury", after preparing an alloy or mercury and antimony.

Modern historian of alchemy William R. Newman regards Fatio as Newton's principal alchemical collaborator during Newton's long career in that field. Newton and Fatio corresponded extensively on this subject between 1689 and 1694. Both men were primarily interested in chrysopoeia and the deciphering of recipes for the preparation of the philosopher's stone that circulated privately within circles of alchemical adepts. They were also interested in the preparation of medical remedies.

Starting in the spring of 1693, Fatio and Newton corresponded on methods for preparing the "sophic mercury" of alchemist George Starkey. Some of the recipes considered by Fatio and Newton involved the "purification" of ordinary mercury with the mineral stibnite. In modern chemical terms, this process yields an amalgam of antimony. When mixed with silver and gold, this can produce a dendritic crystallization that Fatio referred to as "golden trees, with their leaves and fruits". This is related to the phenomenon known as "Diana's Tree". Starkey and others claimed that this "sophic mercury" could "digest" the gold into its final degree of maturity, allowing it finally to "ripen" into the philosopher's stone, which could then be used to transmute base metals into gold.

Fatio also acted as an intermediary between Newton and a French-speaking alchemist living in London whom he identified as "Monsieur de Tegny", a Huguenot captain in the infantry regiment led by Colonel François Dupuy de Cambon, which fought with William III in Flanders during the Nine Years' War. Fatio wrote to Newton that this M. de Tegny owned an estate in Poitou, close to a place "where they dig some excellent Antimony".

== Contributions to watchmaking ==
Pierced jewel and capstone, used as a low-friction bearing in a mechanical watch. Lubrication is provided by a small drop of oil, kept in place by capillary action.

In the 1690s, Fatio discovered a method for piercing a small and well-rounded hole in a ruby, using a diamond drill. Such pierced rubies can serve as jewel bearings in mechanical watches, reducing the friction and corrosion of the watch's internal mechanism, and thereby improving both accuracy and working life. Fatio sought unsuccessfully to interest Parisian watchmakers in his invention. Back in London, Fatio partnered with the Huguenot brothers Peter and Jacob Debaufre (or "de Beaufré"), who kept a successful watchmaking shop in Church Street, Soho. In 1704, Fatio and the Debaufres obtained a fourteen-year patent (no. 371) for the sole use in England of Fatio's invention relating to rubies. They later attempted unsuccessfully to have the patent extended to "the sole applying [of] precious and more common stones in Clocks and Watches".

In March 1705, Fatio exhibited specimens of watches thus jewelled to the Royal Society. The correspondence of Isaac Newton shows that in 1717 Fatio agreed to make a watch for Richard Bentley in exchange for a payment of £15, and that in 1724 he sought permission from Newton to use Newton's name in advertising his jewelled watches. Fatio's method for piercing rubies remained a speciality of English watchmaking until it was adopted in the Continent in 1768 by Ferdinand Berthoud. Jewel bearings are still used today in mechanical watches.

== Later life ==
By the summer of 1694, Fatio was employed as a tutor to Wriothesley Russell, the heir of the Duke of Bedford, a position for which he had been recommended by Locke. Fatio accompanied his pupil to Oxford and, during 1697–8, to Holland. Fatio was in Switzerland in 1699, 1700, and 1701. In Duillier he was reconciled to his father and collaborated with his brother Jean-Christophe in surveying the mountains around Lac Léman. At this time Fatio began a deep study of the prophetic books in the Bible.

=== Involvement with the "French prophets" ===
Back in London, Fatio worked as a mathematical tutor in Spitalfields. In 1706, he began to associate with the Camisards, radical Protestant exiles ("Huguenots") who had fled from France during the Wars of Religion in that country. Fatio became attached to a millenarian group known as the "French prophets", who preached impending destruction and judgment. In 1707, Élie Marion, Jean Daudé, and Fatio were tried before the Queen's Bench on charges brought against them by the mainstream Huguenot churches in London. This prosecution for sedition was backed by the British government, which suspected the French prophets of contriving a political scheme.

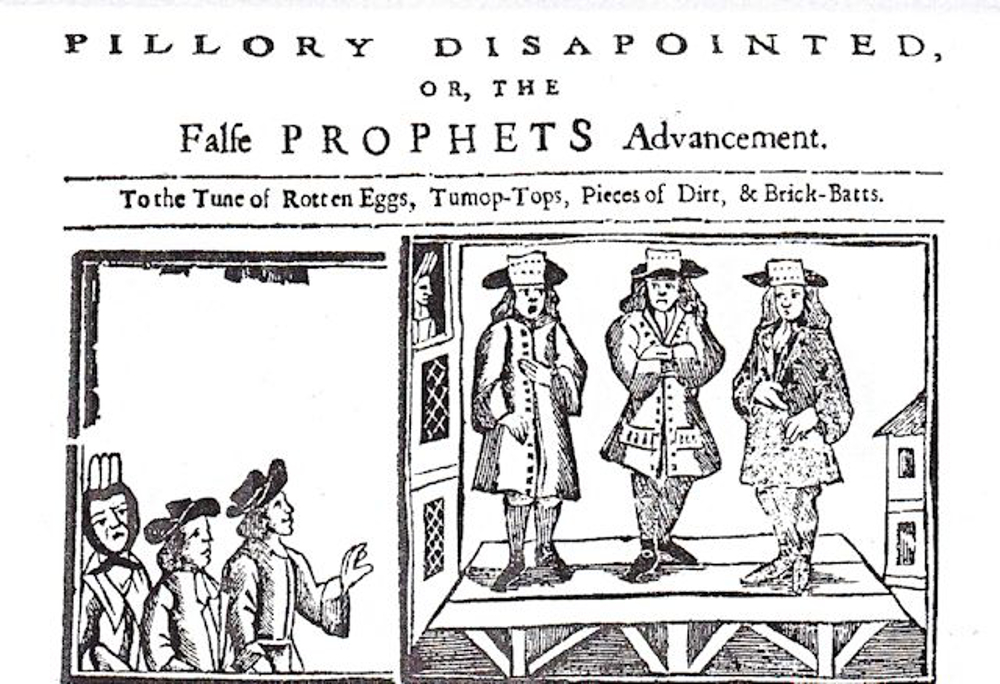
Title and illustration of an anonymous handbill printed in London in 1707. The picture shows Élie Marion, Jean Daudé, and Nicolas Fatio de Duillier, leaders of the so-called French prophets, standing on the scaffold at Charing Cross after being sentenced to the pillory for sedition.

Marion, Daudé, and Fatio were convicted of sedition and sentenced to the pillory. On 2 December, Fatio stood on a scaffold at Charing Cross with an inscription on his hat that read

Nicolas Fatio convicted for abetting and favouring Elias Marion, in the Wicked and counterfeit prophecies, and causing them to be printed and published, to terrify the Queen's people.

By the influence of the Duke of Ormonde, to whose brother, Lord Arran, Fatio had been tutor, he was protected from the violence of the mob. Fatio was among those who believed in the prophecy that Thomas Emes would be raised from the dead, attracting ridicule and condemnation even from his own brother.

Fatio found employment in London for a time as a mathematical tutor to Andrew Michael Ramsay, whom he also introduced to the French Prophets. In 1711 Fatio travelled to Berlin, Halle, and Vienna as a missionary of the French prophets. A second mission in 1712–13 took him to Stockholm, Prussia, Halle, Constantinople, Smyrna, and Rome. The four men on the mission, including Fatio, were caught as Swedish spies by officers of the Polish Prussia and languished in prison for eight months. Fatio then moved to Holland, where he wrote accounts of his missions and of the prophecies delivered during them. Some of these accounts, in French and Latin, were published in 1714.

=== Further intellectual work ===
Back in London, Fatio once again communicated with the Royal Society, of which his old friend Sir Isaac Newton had been president since 1704. In 1717 Fatio presented a series of papers on the precession of the equinoxes and climate change, subjects that he regarded from both a scientific and a millenarian perspective. In the spring of that same year he moved to Worcester, where he formed some congenial friendships and busied himself with scientific pursuits, alchemy, and study of the cabbala. Fatio would spend the rest of his life in Worcester and nearby Madresfield.

Fatio had several memorandums sent to Edmond Halley with the help from William Whiston, now digitized at Bibliotheque de Geneve (Ms. fr. 602). In these memorandums he introduced an invention which used ruby bearings to achieve stability for the magnetic compass so that it can be used at sea without disturbance from the ocean waves. The revised compass could improve observations for the longitude near the equator. Fatio also proposed a method for finding longitude by observing the meridian, including projections of the Sun & Moon on the table.

After the death of Isaac Newton in 1727, Fatio composed a poetic hymn (eclogue) on Newton's genius, written in Latin and published in 1728. According to modern Newton scholar Robert Iliffe, this is "the most interesting poetic response to Newton".

In 1732, Fatio collaborated with Newton's nephew-in-law and executor, John Conduitt, in the design of the funerary monument to Newton in Westminster Abbey, and in composing the inscription for it. At that time, Fatio also sought Conduitt's help in his effort (which was ultimately unsuccessful) to obtain a belated reward for having saved the Prince of Orange from Count Fenil's kidnapping plot. Fatio also unsuccessfully sought Conduitt's support for the publication of his "push-shadow" theory of gravity, on which he had been working for more than forty years.

A letter from Fatio de Duillier to Francis Hauksbee the Younger, dated in 1737, now in the collections of the British Library showed his continued research on chemistry and pharmacy. He investigated a hot spring near Madresfield, Worcester, and purified some salts from the mineral water. In the letter he complained to Hauksbee about Francis Moult losing the salts he asked him to preserve. Moult, a wealthy apothecary in London, was also a scribe of the French Prophets. Fatio recorded several experiments he did with the salts, and mentioned their potential value for medications and investments.

=== Death ===
Fatio died on either 28 April or 12 May 1753 in Madresfield, at the age of 89. He was buried at the church of St Nicholas, Worcester, now deconsecrated. His compatriot Georges-Louis Le Sage later purchased many of his scientific papers which, together with those of Le Sage, are now in the Geneva Library.

== Legacy ==
=== Inventions ===
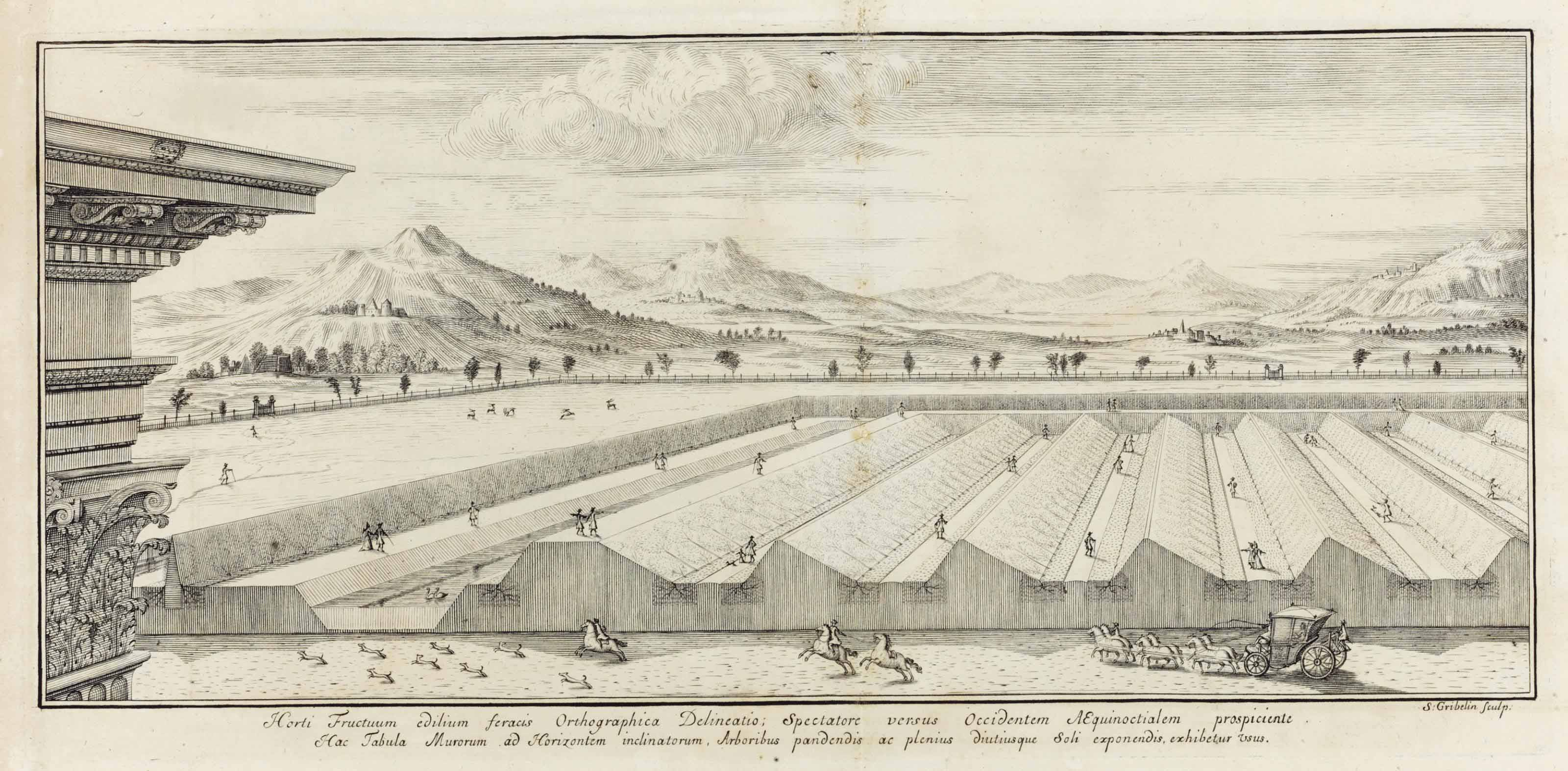
Engraving for a work published by Nicolas Fatio de Duillier in 1699, describing his invention of sloping fruit walls, intended to collect heat from sunlight and thus to promote plant growth.

Throughout his long life Fatio proposed and developed various technological innovations. Undoubtedly the most significant of these was the jewel bearing, still used today in the manufacture of luxury mechanical watches. But Fatio's efforts as an inventor extended into many areas beyond watchmaking.

To optimise the capture of solar energy and thereby increase agricultural yields, Fatio suggested building sloping fruit walls, precisely angled to maximize the collection of heat from sunlight. Having supervised the building of such walls in Belvoir Castle, in 1699 he published an illustrated treatise that described his invention and included theoretical considerations about solar radiation. That work appeared with the imprimatur of the Royal Society. Fatio also proposed a tracking mechanism that could pivot to follow the Sun. Such ideas were superseded by the development of modern greenhouses.

One must add to the catalogue of Fatio's inventions his early work on improving the grinding of lenses for the objectives of telescopes, as well as his later proposals for taking advantage of a ship's motion to grind corn, saw, raise anchors, and hoist rigging. He also contrived a ship's observatory and measured the height of the mountains surrounding Geneva, planning, but never completing, a detailed map of Lac Léman.

=== Push-shadow gravity ===
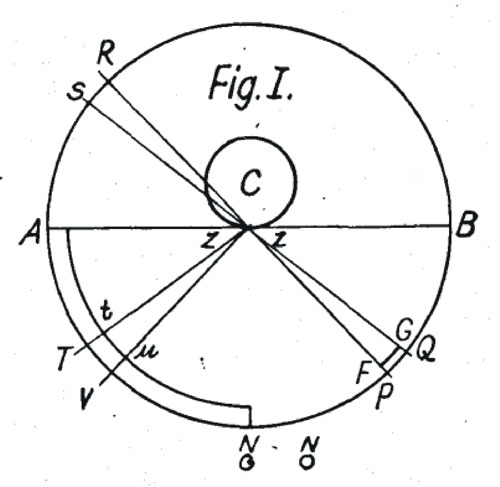
Diagram from Fatio's account of his theory of push-shadow gravity, as reproduced for publication by Karl Bopp.

Fatio considered that his greatest work was his explanation of Newtonian gravity in terms of collisions between ordinary matter and aetherial corpuscles moving rapidly in all directions. Fatio was motivated by Huygens's earlier work on a "mechanical" explanation of gravity in terms of contact interactions between ordinary matter and an aether, and perhaps also by the success of his explanation of zodiacal light as sunlight scattered by an interplanetary cloud of fine particles. The need to make the collisions between ordinary matter and the aetherial corpuscles inelastic implied that Fatio's aetherial corpuscles must also exert a drag resistance on the motion of celestial bodies. Fatio therefore failed to interest Huygens (who believed in the conservation of vis viva) in his proposal. Huygens may also have found Fatio's theory uncongenial because it assumed an empty space in which the aetherial corpuscles moved, a view contrary to the plenism of Huygens and Leibniz, who conceived of the aether as a fluid pervading all of space.

Finding that the drag resistance was proportional to the product of the speed and the density of the aetherial corpuscles, while the gravitational attraction was proportional to the density and the square of the speed of the corpuscles, Fatio concluded that the drag could be made negligible by decreasing the density while increasing the speed. However, despite some initial enthusiasm on the part of Newton and Halley, Fatio's theory of gravity soon fell into oblivion and Newton abandoned all attempts to explain gravity in terms of contact interactions.

Fatio corresponded about his theory with Jacob Bernoulli in 1700 and he continued to revise and promote his theory until the end of his life, but he never published that work. A copy of Fatio's manuscript came to the attention of the Genevan mathematician Gabriel Cramer, who in 1731 published a dissertation containing a summary of Fatio's theory, without attribution. Another Genevan, Georges-Louis Le Sage, independently re-discovered the same idea before Cramer introduced him to Fatio's work in 1749. Since then, the corresponding theory has been commonly known as "Le Sage's theory of gravitation".

The success of the kinetic theory of gases contributed to reviving interest in the Fatio-Le Sage theory during the second half of the 19th century. In 1878, James Clerk Maxwell characterized it as "the only theory of the cause of gravitation which has been so far developed as to be capable of being attacked and defended." Another leading physicist who took this theory seriously was Nobel laureate J. J. Thomson.

Fatio's account of his gravitational theory finally published in 1929, in an edition prepared by the German historian of mathematics Karl Bopp, and then again independently in 1949 by Bernard Gagnebin, the conservator of manuscripts at the Geneva Library. Even though the modern scientific consensus is that the Fatio-Le Sage theory is inviable as an account of gravity, the process that he described does give rise to an attractive inverse-square force between particles immersed in a rare medium at a higher temperature. George Gamow proposed in 1949 that such a "mock gravity" could have played a role in galaxy formation after the Big Bang. A. M. Ignatov showed in 1996 that a similar process produces an attraction between dust grains in a dusty plasma.

=== Cultural references ===
The Genevan naturalist Jean Senebier, writing thirty years after Fatio's death, declared that

This man who was the friend of Newton, of Huygens, of Jacob Bernoulli; who learned from Newton the infinitesimal calculus and who taught it to De Moivre; who, after having been linked to Leibniz and Johann Bernoulli, crossed them by taking sides against Leibniz in his dispute over the invention of the higher calculus. This man, illustrious in his many titles, is hardly known today in the Republic of Letters, or at least he is not cited anywhere, nor named in the history of the sciences that he so advantageously cultivated.

— Histoire littéraire de Genève, vol. III (1786), pp. 155–65

Two scholarly biographies of Isaac Newton published in the 20th century, Frank E. Manuel's A Portrait of Isaac Newton (1968) and Richard S. Westfall's Never at Rest (1980) considered at length the personal relationship between Fatio and Newton. Manuel and Westfall both suggested that there might have been a sentimental or sexual element to the attachment between both men, and that Newton's nervous breakdown in 1693 might have been connected with a rupture in that relationship. A similar interpretation appears in Michael White's popular biography Isaac Newton: The Last Sorcerer (1997). Alternatively, historian Scott Mandelbrote writes:

I see no merit in [Manuel’s and Westfall’s] suggestion that Newton’s behaviour in 1693 might be due to developments in his relationship with Fatio, nor in the view that their friendship was based on sexual attraction, whether consummated or unconsummated [...] This interpretation is based largely on the exaggeration of Newton’s comments in a single letter.

Mandelbrote's judgment has found support in later work by professional historians specializing on Newton, including Robert Iliffe and William R. Newman. According to Newman,

Any attempt to link Newton’s "derangement" to a precipitous break with Fatio around the time of the letters to Pepys and Locke can no longer be countenanced. In fact, one cannot avoid the suspicion that previous writers on Newton may have overdramatized both his reaction to Fatio and his strange behavior of 1693.

Fatio's connection with Newton has been treated in several works of historical fiction. He appears as a supporting character in Michael White's novel Equinox (2006), in Neal Stephenson's trilogy The Baroque Cycle (2003–04), in Stuart Clark's novel "The Sensorium of God" (Book 2 of his triology The Sky's Dark Labyrinth), and in Gregory Keyes's novel series The Age of Unreason (1998–2001).

== Works ==
=== Books ===
Fatio was the author of the following works, published in book form during his lifetime:

- Epistola de mari æneo Salomonis ("Letter on Solomon's Brazen Sea"), in Edward Bernard's De Mensuris et Ponderibus antiquis Libri tres ("On Ancient Measures and Weights, in three books"), 8vo, Oxford, 1688
- Lineæ brevissimæ descensus investigatio geometrica duplex, cui addita est investigatio geometrica solidi rotundi in quo minima fiat resistentia ("A two-fold geometrical investigation of the line of briefest descent, to which is added a geometric investigation of the solid of revolution that produces the minimum resistance"), 4to, London, 1699
- Fruit-walls improved by inclining them to the horizon, by a member of the Royal Society (signed N. F. D.), 4to, London, 1699
- N. Facii Duillerii Neutonus. Ecloga. ("N. Fatio de Duillier's Newton. Eclogue."), 8vo, Oxford, 1728
- Navigation improved: being chiefly the method for finding the latitude at sea as well as by land, by taking any proper altitudes, with the time between the observations, fol., London, 1728

With Jean Allut, Elie Marion, and other of the "French prophets", Fatio issued a prophecy with the title Plan de la Justice de Dieu sur la terre dans ces derniers jours et du relévement de la chûte de l'homme par son péché ("Plan of God's Justice upon the earth in these last days, and of the release of man's fall by his sin") 2 parts, 8vo, 1714, of which a Latin version appeared during the same year.

=== Periodicals ===
In periodicals Fatio published the following works:

- Lettre sur la manière de faire des Bassins pour travailler les verres objectifs des Telescopes ("Letter on the manner of making basins for grinding the objective glasses of telescopes"), Journal des sçavans, Paris, 1684
- Lettre à M. Cassini touchant une lumière extraordinaire qui paroît dans le Ciel depuis quelques années ("Letter to Mr. Cassini concerning the extraordinary light that has appeared in the Heavens for some years"), in Jean Leclerc's Bibliothèque Universelle et Historique, vol. III, Amsterdam, 1686
- Réflexions sur une méthode de trouver les tangentes de certaines lignes courbes, qui vient d'être publiée dans un livre intitulé: Medicina Mentis ("Reflections on a method for finding the tangents of certain curves, recently published in a book titled Medicina Mentis"), Bibliothèque Universelle et Historique, vol. V, 1687
- Excerpta ex suâ responsione ad excerpta ex litteris J. Bernouilli ("Excerpts from his response to excerpts from a letter by Johann Bernoulli"), Acta Eruditorum, Leipzig, 1700
- "Epistola ad fratrem Joh. Christoph. Facium, qua vindicat Solutionem suam Problematis de inveniendo solido rotundo seu tereti in quo minima fiat resistentia" ("Letter to his brother Jean Christophe Fatio, vindicating his solution to the problem of the solid of revolution that produces the minimum resistance"), Philosophical Transactions, vol. XXVIII, pp. 172–6, 1713
- "Four theorems, with their demonstration, for determining accurately the sun's parallax", Miscellanea curiosa mathematica, vol. II, no. 1 (London, 1745)

Fatio also contributed articles on astronomy and ancient Hebrew units of measurement to nearly every number of the Gentleman's Magazine for 1737–38.

=== Manuscripts ===
Upon his death, Fatio left a number of manuscripts, some of which passed into the hands of Dr. James Johnstone of Kidderminster. Others were acquired by Prof. Georges-Louis Le Sage of Geneva, who amassed a large collection of Fatio's letters, now at the Bibliothèque de Genève. A few of Fatio's papers and letters are in the British Library. Among them is a Latin poem entitled N. Facii Duellerii Auriacus Throno-servatus ("N. Fatio de Duillier's Orange Throne Preserved", Addit. MS. 4163), containing a narrative of Count Fenil's plot against Prince William of Orange, as well as a description of Fatio's jewelled watches. A series of letters to Sir Hans Sloane (ib. 4044) extend from 1714 to 1736. Other letters of his are in fasciculus 2 of C. Hugenii aliorumque seculi xvii. virorum celebrium Exercitationes Mathematicæ et Philosophicæ, 4to, the Hague, 1833.

=== Posthumous publications ===
Some of Fatio's letters were included in the correspondence volumes of the Oeuvres complètes ("Complete Works") of Christiaan Huygens (published between 1888 and 1950 by the Dutch Academy of Sciences) and in The Correspondence of Isaac Newton (published between 1959 and 1977 by the Royal Society). Fatio's treatise describing his work on the push-shadow theory of gravity circulated during his lifetime only as a manuscript. That work was published, long after his death, in two independent scholarly editions:

- Bopp, Karl (1929). "Die wiederaufgefundene Abhandlung von Fatio de Duillier: De la Cause de la Pesanteur". Drei Untersuchungen zur Geschichte der Mathematik. Schriften der Wissenschaftlichen Gesellschaft in Straßburg. De Gruyter. pp. 19–66.
- Gagnebin, Bernard (1949). "De la cause de la pesanteur. Mémoire de Nicolas Fatio de Duillier présente à la Royal Society le 26 février 1690". Notes and Records of the Royal Society. 6 (2): 105–124. doi:10.1098/rsnr.1949.0017. S2CID 189616407.

Even though it appeared twenty years earlier, Bopp's edition of Fatio's manuscript is the more complete of the two.

The full Latin text of Fatio's 1728 eclogue on Newton, along with an English translation and commentary, was published in:

- Figala, Karin; Petzold, Ulrich (1987). "Physics and Poetry: Fatio de Duillier's Ecloga on Newton's Principia". Archives internationales d'histoire des sciences. 37 (119): 316–49.

== Sources ==
- Wolf, R. (1862), "Nicholas Fatio van Basel.", Biographien zur Kulturgeschichte der Schweiz, 4: 67–86
- Domson, C. (1972), Nicolas Fatio de Duillier and the Prophets of London, Ayer Publishing, ISBN 0-405-13852-0
