= Jean-Louis Calandrini =

Genevan mathematician (1703–1758)

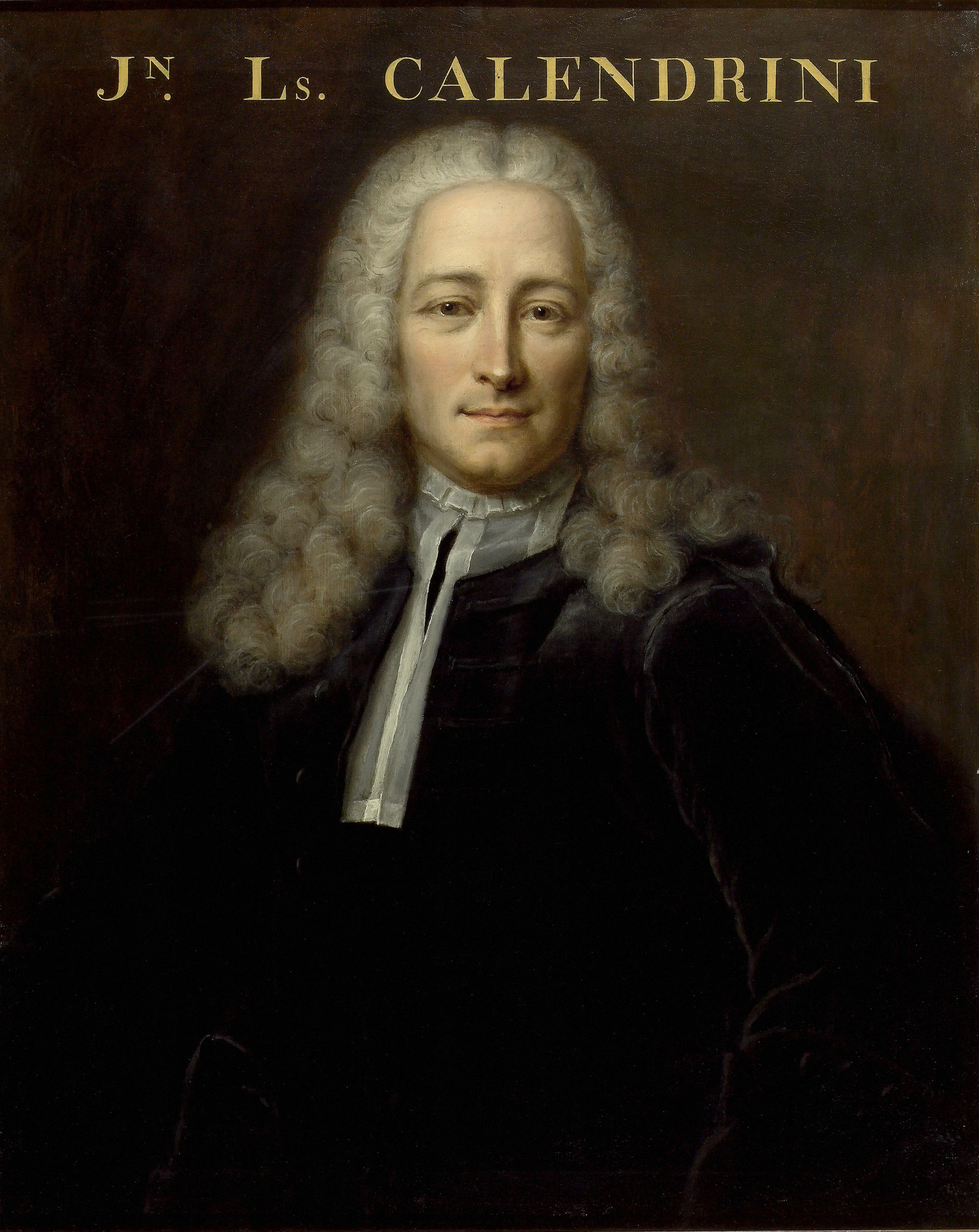
- Jean-Louis Calandrini (1703-1758). Portrait by the Geneva painter Robert Gardelle in 1760.
- Born: August 30, 1703; Geneva, Republic of Geneva
- Died: December 29, 1758 (aged 55); Geneva, Republic of Geneva
- Education: Academy of Geneva
- Known for: Commentary on the Principia of Isaac Newton
- Scientific career
- Fields: Mathematics, philosophy, and physics
- Workplaces: Academy of Geneva
- Doctoral advisor: Jean-Antoine Gautier
- Notable students: Georges-Louis Le Sage

Jean-Louis Calandrini (August 30, 1703 – December 29, 1758) was a Genevan scientist. He was a professor of mathematics and philosophy at the Academy of Geneva.

== Biography ==
Calandrini's father was a Reformed pastor, also named Jean-Louis, and his mother was Michée Du Pan. He was the grandnephew of Bénédict Calandrini. In 1729, he married Renée Lullin. At the Academy of Geneva, he obtained his doctorate in physics (1722). In 1724, Calandrini was named mathematics professor at the same time as Gabriel Cramer, but he first undertook a three-year journey to France and England. He was appointed professor of philosophy from 1734 to 1750. He also played an active role on the political scene of Geneva.

Calandrini was the author of some studies on the aurora borealis, comets, and the effects of lightning, as well as of an important but unpublished work on flat and spherical trigonometry. He also wrote a commentary on the Principia of Isaac Newton (published in Geneva, 1739–42), for which he wrote approximately one hundred footnotes.

He was also known as a botanist. The genus Calandrinia was named after him.

== Sources ==
- "Jean-Louis Calandrini" in German, French and Italian in the online Historical Dictionary of Switzerland.
