= Pierre Prevost (physicist) =

Swiss physicist (1751–1839)

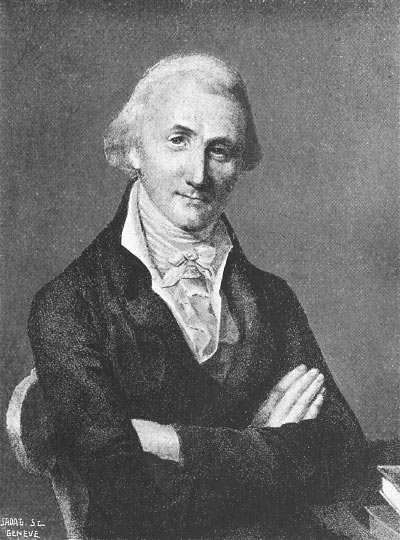
Scientist Pierre Prevost in the Journal Officiel Illustré De L'Exposition Nationale, Suisse Genève 1896

Pierre Prevost (French: [pjɛʁ pʁevo]; 3 March 1751 – 8 April 1839) was a Genevan philosopher and physicist. In 1791 he explained Pictet's experiment by arguing that all bodies radiate heat, no matter how hot or cold they are.

== Life ==
Son of a Protestant clergyman in Geneva in the Republic of Geneva, he was born in that city and was educated for a clerical career. However, he abandoned it for law, and this too he quickly deserted to devote himself to education and to travelling. He became close friends with Jean Jacques Rousseau and, a little later, with Dugald Stewart, having previously distinguished himself as a translator of and commentator on Euripides.

Frederick II of Prussia secured him in 1780 as professor of philosophy and made him member of the Akademie der Wissenschaften in Berlin. He there became acquainted with Joseph Louis Lagrange and was thus led to turn his attention to physical science.

After some years spent on political economy and on the principles of the fine arts (in connection with which he wrote, for the Berlin Memoirs, a remarkable dissertation on poetry) he returned to Geneva and began his work on magnetism and on heat. Interrupted occasionally in his studies by political duties in which he was often called to the front, he remained professor of philosophy at Geneva until he was called in 1810 to the chair of physics.

He died at Geneva in 1839.

== Work ==
Prévost published much on philology, philosophy, and political economy, but he will be remembered mainly for having published, with additions of his own, the Traité de physique by Georges-Louis Le Sage, and for his enunciation of the law of exchange in radiation.

His scientific publications included De l'Origine des forces magnetiques, Mémoire sur l'Equilibre du feu, Recherches physico-mecaniques sur la chaleur, and Essai sur le calorique rayonnant.

== See also ==
- Radiative equilibrium
