= Samuel Tolver Preston =

British physicist (1844–1917)

Samuel Tolver Preston (8 July 1844 – 1917) was an English engineer and physicist. He was educated as a Telegraph-engineer. He went to Munich, where he attained his Ph.D. in 1894 with Ludwig Boltzmann. After that, he worked as a teacher.

He is known for his works (1875–1894) on the kinetic theory of gases and his attempts to combine this theory with Le Sage's theory of gravitation. In his book Physics of the Ether (1875), he postulated that, if matter is subdivided into "ether particles", they would travel at the speed of light and represent an enormous amount of energy. In this way, one grain of matter would contain energy equal to 1000 million foot-tons.

Preston also seemed to be the first (1885) to recognize the redundancy of Michael Faraday's explanation of electromagnetic induction. Some years later, Albert Einstein considered this redundancy a form of asymmetry related to his theory of special relativity.

In 1876, Preston corresponded with James Clerk Maxwell and alluded to the work of John James Waterston. In 1880, he corresponded with Charles Robert Darwin.

== Publications ==
- Physics of the ether; 1875
- On some dynamical conditions applicable to LeSage’s theory of gravitation (1877); Phil. Mag., fifth ser. Vol. 4 (1877), pp. 206–213, 364–375; Vol. 5 (1878), pp. 117–127, 297–311
- Mode of the Propagation of Sound, and the Physical Condition Determining its Velocity on the Basis of the Kinetic Theory of Gases; (1877)
- Temperature Equilibrium in the Universe in Relation to the Kinetic Theory; Nature 20, 1879, p. 28
- On the Possibility of Accounting for the Continuance of Recurring Changes in the Universe, consistently with the Tendency to Temperature-Equilibrium; Philosophical Magazine 8, 1879, p. 152/163.
- On the possibility of explaining the continuance of life in the Universe Consistent with the Tendency to Temperature-equilibrium; Nature 19, 1879, p. 460/462
- On Method in Causal Research; in: Philosophical magazine, ix (1880), S. 356–367
- A Question regarding one of the Physical Premises upon which the Finality of Universal Change is based; Philosophical Magazine 10, 1880, p. 338/342.
- Science and sectarian religion; in: S. T. Preston, Original essays; London, 1884, S. 19–51.
- Ueber das gegenseitige Verhältniss einiger zur dynamischen Erklärung der Gravitation aufgestellten Hypothesen; Inauguraldissertation von 1894, München, Phil. Fak.
- Comparative Review of some Dynamical Theories of Gravitation; Philosophical Magazine 1895, Vol. 35, p. 145ff.
- On Certain Questions connected with Astronomical Physics; Philosophical Magazine 1906, Vol. 12, p. 560ff.
- On Certain Questions connected with Astronomical Physics, Part II; Philosophical Magazine 1907, Vol. 14, p. 265ff.
- On some Physical Relations affecting Matter in Diverse Stages of Subdivision; Philosophical Magazine 1908, Vol. 16, p. 345ff.

== See also ==
- Olinto De Pretto – Italian industrialist and geologist (1857–1921)
- Aether theories – in the history of physics, discredited theories that proposed the existence of a medium, a space-filling substance or field, as a transmission medium for the propagation of electromagnetic or gravitational forces.
- History of special relativity
  - Relativity priority dispute – Issue in science history
