= Firmin Abauzit =

French-Genevan scholar (1679–1767)

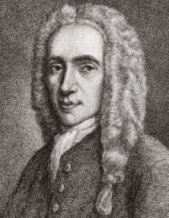
- Born: 11 November 1679; Uzès, Languedoc, Kingdom of France
- Died: 20 March 1767 (aged 87); Geneva, Republic of Geneva
- Citizenship: Republic of Geneva
- Known for: Proofreading or correcting the writings of Isaac Newton
- Scientific career
- Fields: Physics; Theology; Philosophy

Firmin Abauzit (11 November 1679 – 20 March 1767) was a French scholar who worked on physics, theology and philosophy, and served as librarian in Geneva (Republic of Geneva) during his final 40 years. Abauzit is also notable for proofreading or correcting the writings of Isaac Newton and other scholars.

== Biography ==
Firmin Abauzit was born of Huguenot parents on 11 November 1679 at Uzès, in Languedoc. His paternal family traces its origin to an Arab physician who settled in Toulouse during the 9th century. Accordingly, the name “Abauzit” is liked derived from the Arabic “Abu Zaid” (father of Zaid).

His father died when he was only two years of age; and when, on the revocation of the Edict of Nantes in 1685, the authorities took steps to have him educated in the Roman Catholic faith, his mother contrived his escape.

For two years his brother and he lived as fugitives in the mountains of the Cévennes, but they at last reached Geneva, where their mother afterwards joined them on escaping from the imprisonment in which she was held from the time of their flight. Abauzit at an early age acquired great proficiency in languages, physics, and theology.

In 1698, he traveled to Germany, then to Holland, where he became acquainted with Pierre Bayle, Pierre Jurieu and Jacques Basnage. Proceeding to England, he was introduced to Sir Isaac Newton, who found in him one of the earliest defenders of his discoveries against Castel. Newton corrected in the second edition of his Principia an error pointed out by Abauzit, and, when sending him the Commercium Epistolicum, said, "You are well worthy to judge between Leibnitz and me."

The reputation of Abauzit induced William III to request him to settle in England, but he did not accept the king's offer, preferring to return to Geneva. There from 1715 he rendered valuable assistance to a society that had been formed for translating the New Testament into French. He declined the offer of the chair of philosophy at the University of Geneva in 1723. He assisted in the French language New Testament in 1726. In 1727, he was granted citizenship in Geneva, and he accepted the office of honorary librarian to Geneva, the city of his adoption. It was while he was in Geneva in his later years that he authored many of his works. He died in Geneva at the age of 87, on 20 March 1767.

== Legacy ==
Abauzit was a man of great learning and of wonderful versatility. Whatever chanced to be discussed, it used to be said of Abauzit that he seemed to have made it a subject of particular study. Rousseau, who was jealously sparing of his praises, addressed to him, in his Julie, ou la nouvelle Héloïse, a fine panegyric; and when a stranger flatteringly told Voltaire he had come to see a great man, the philosopher asked him if he had seen Abauzit. Among his acquaintances, Abauzit claimed Rousseau, Voltaire, Newton, and Bayle.

Little remains of the labours of this intellectual giant, his heirs having, it is said, destroyed the papers that came into their possession, because their own religious opinions were different. A few theological, archaeological, and astronomical articles from his pen appeared in the Journal helvétique and elsewhere, and he contributed several papers to Rousseau's Dictionnaire de musique (1767). He wrote a work throwing doubt on the canonical authority of the Apocalypse, which called forth a reply from Dr Leonard Twells, and was published in Denis Diderot's Encyclopédie. He also edited and made valuable additions to Jacob Spon's Histoire de la république de Genève. A collection of his writings was published at Geneva in 1770 (Œuvres de feu M. Abauzit), and another at London in 1773 (Œuvres diverses de M. Abauzit).

=== Works ===
Works of Abauzit
year	Title	Notes
	Articles	Multiple articles for Journal helvétique
1726	French language New Testament	Collaboration
	apocalypse	Article for Denis Diderot's Encyclopédie
1767	Articles	Multiple articles for Dictionnaire de musique
	Edited and contributions	Histoire de la république de Genève by Jacob Spon
1770	Œuvres de feu M. Abauzit	Posthumously published collection
1773	Œuvres diverses de M. Abauzit	Posthumously published collection
