= Karl Bopp =

German historian of mathematics

- Born: 28 March 1877; Rastatt
- Died: 5 December 1934 (aged 57); Heidelberg
- Education: University of Heidelberg
- Scientific career
- Fields: Mathematics
- Workplaces: University of Heidelberg
- Doctoral advisor: Moritz Cantor; Leo Königsberger

Karl Bopp (28 March 1877 – 5 December 1934) was a German historian of mathematics.

== Biography ==
Bopp studied at the University of Strasbourg and the University of Heidelberg under Moritz Cantor. In 1906 he habilitated with a work about the conic sections of Grégoire de Saint-Vincent, and in 1915 he became professor extraordinarius in Heidelberg. As successor of Moritz Cantor he taught history of mathematics, political arithmetic, and Insurance. In 1933 he became ill and died in 1934.

Bopp's special field of interest were researches about Johann Heinrich Lambert. He edited Lambert's Monatsbuch, his letter exchanges with Leonhard Euler and Abraham Gotthelf Kästner, and his philosophical writings. Bopp wrote many historical papers, including two studies on the history of elliptic functions, and the re-publication of a paper by Nicolas Fatio de Duillier on the cause of gravitation. Under his supervision many dissertations were written by his students.
