= Marcet =

Marcet is a surname. Notable people with the name include:

- Anna Marcet Haldeman (1887–1941), American feminist, actress, civil rights advocate, bank president
- Albert Marcet (born 1960), Spanish economist
- Alexander Marcet FRS (1770–1822), Genevan-born physician, became a British citizen in 1800
- Jane Marcet (1769–1858), English salonnière of Republic of Geneva descent, writer of popular science books
- William Marcet FRS FRCP (1828–1900), President of the Royal Meteorological Society
- Carlos Marqués-Marcet (born 1983), Spanish film director, screenwriter and film editor

== See also ==
- Marcet Island, uninhabited island within the Arctic Archipelago in the Kitikmeot Region, Nunavut
- Saint-Marcet, commune in the Haute-Garonne department in southwestern France
- Marcet Football University or Marcet Foundation, youth education and football organization
