= De la Rive =

De la Rive (the d is not capitalized when used in the full name) is the last name of:

- Charles-Gaspard de la Rive (1770–1834), Swiss physician and physicist
- His son Auguste Arthur de la Rive (1801–1873), Swiss physicist
- His son Lucien de la Rive (1834–1924), also a Swiss physicist
- François Jules Pictet de la Rive (1809–1872), Swiss zoologist and palaeontologist
