= Charles-Gaspard De la Rive =

Swiss chemist, politician and psychiatrist

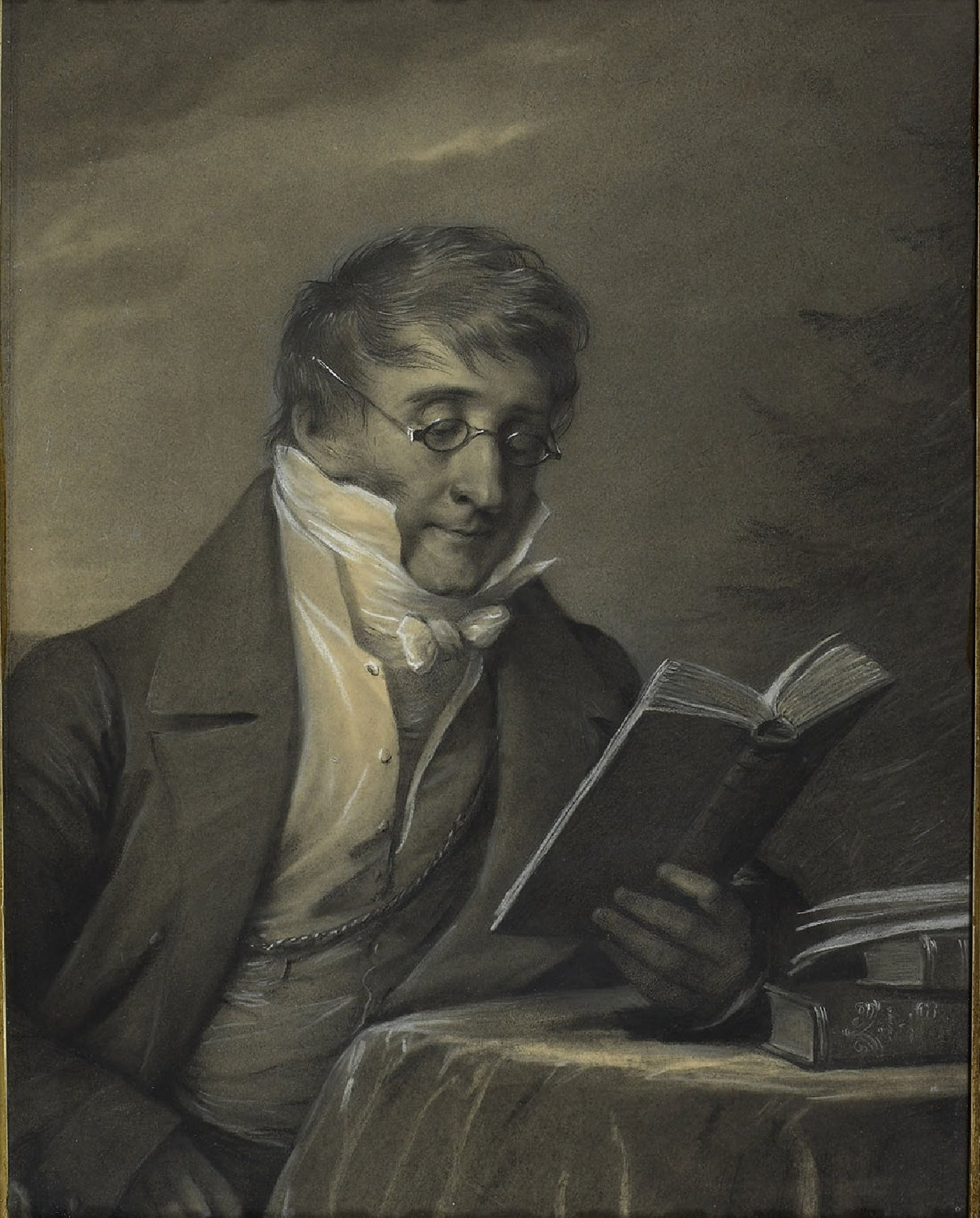
- Born: 14 March 1770; Geneva, Republic of Geneva
- Died: 18 March 1834 (aged 64); Geneva, Switzerland
- Citizenship: Genevan, then Swiss since 1815
- Occupation: Physician
- Spouse: Marguerite Adélaïde Boissier
- Children: Auguste Arthur de la Rive

Charles-Gaspard De la Rive (14 March 1770 – 18 March 1834) was a Swiss medical doctor who specialized in the treatment of mental illness, and later worked as a physicist.

== Early life ==
De la Rive was born in Geneva, and originally studied law. During the Geneva revolution of 1794, he was a freedom fighter and later fled to Scotland with the physician Alexander Marcet. In 1797, he attained a doctorate of medicine from the University of Edinburgh while working with his teacher John Allen on the work Tentamen physiologicum inaugurale, de calore animali .... According to De la Rive, Allen believed that the body heat of animals is based on the combustion of food particles in the blood. After practising for a few years in London, where he visited several asylums, he returned to Geneva.

== Physician ==
After his return, he became professor of pharmaceutical chemistry at the Geneva Academy in 1802 and of general chemistry in 1819, becoming rector in 1823. He was a physician in the hospice of the mentally ill as early as 1811, and he fought for the construction of an asylum adapted to advances in the science of mental illness, which was completed in 1838. He also worked at the British Library, writing on electricity and chemistry.

== Physicist ==
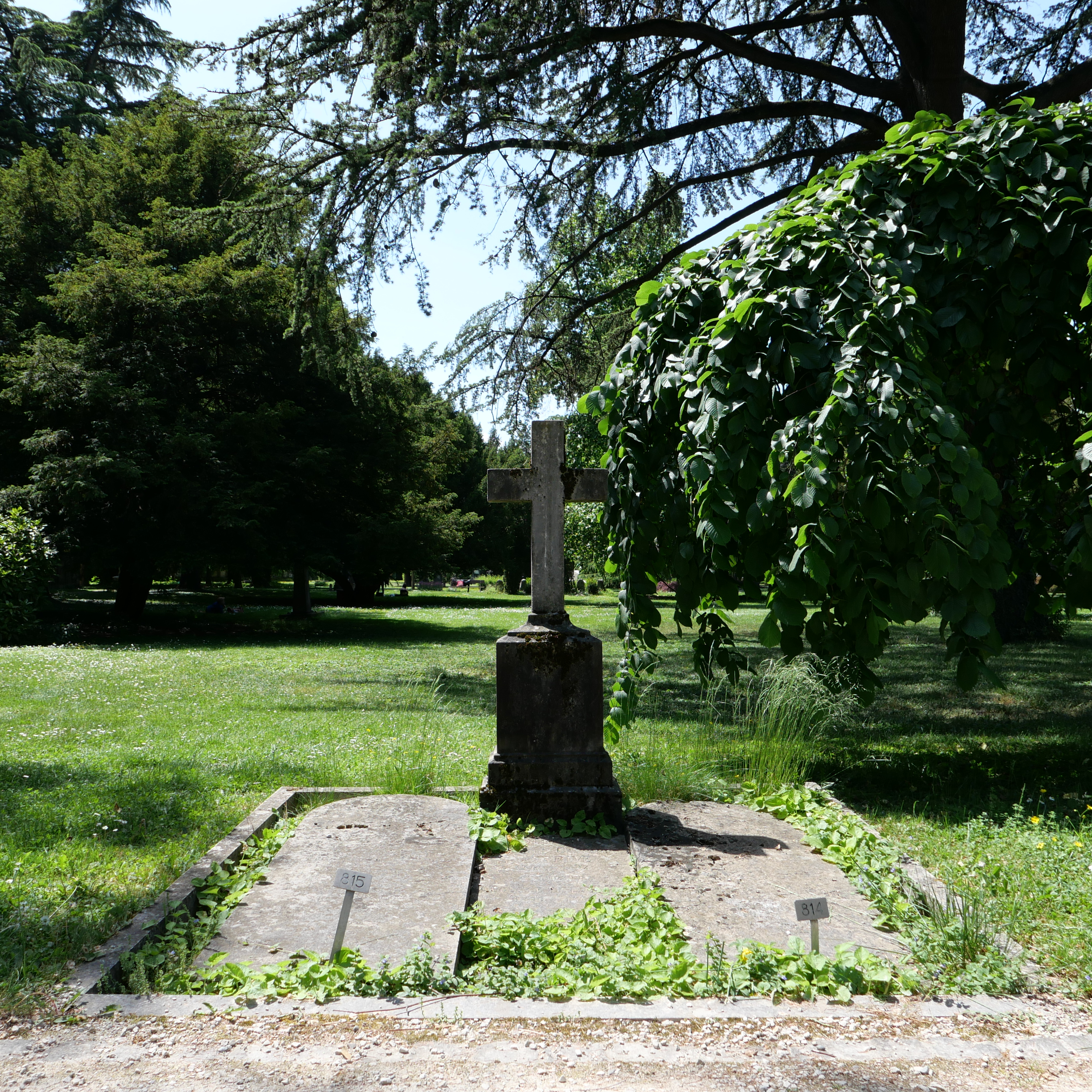
De la Rive's grave at the Cimetière des Rois in Geneva

In the summer of 1814 he was visited by Humphry Davy and Michael Faraday, and later André-Marie Ampère. In 1821 he sent Faraday a small apparatus with a floating wire loop that sensitively reacted to the approach of a magnet, which played an important role in Faraday's research. He also had the idea of a galvanometer based on the electrolytic decomposition of water, which was used by Ampère for determining the state of his voltaic piles. He wrote articles on electricity and chemistry for the magazine Bibliothèque Britannique. He also supported Humphry Davy's views on electrochemistry, John Dalton's atomic theory and Jöns Jacob Berzelius's idea of definite proportions.

In addition, De la Rive was politically active. He was a member of the Provisional Council (1813) and a Councillor of State (1814–1818), becoming the premier syndic of Geneva (1817–1818). He was also a member of the Conseil représentatif (1814–1832).

In 1801, he married Marguerite Adélaïde Boissier. Their son was Auguste Arthur de la Rive, a noted Swiss physicist.
