= Bibliothèque universelle =

- Discipline: Multidisciplinary academic
- Language: English

Publication details
- Former names: Bibliothèque universelle de Genève, Bibliothèque universelle des sciences, belles-lettres, et arts
- History: 1816–1924

Standard abbreviations
- ISO 4: Bibl. Univers.

Archives des sciences
- Discipline: Multidisciplinary academic
- Language: English

Publication details
- Former name: Archives des sciences physiques et naturelles
- History: 1947–

Standard abbreviations
- ISO 4: Arch. Sci.

Indexing
- ISSN: 1661-464X

The Bibliothèque universelle was an academic journal published by a group of Genevan scholars first centred on Marc-Auguste Pictet (1752–1825), later around Auguste Arthur de la Rive (1801–1873) and other scholars. It enjoyed a wide audience in the various French-speaking countries of Europe during the 19th century.

== History ==
The initial form of the journal was the Bibliothèque Britannique, which began publication in 1796, and focused on British science, techniques, literature and agriculture. Its founders and editors were Marc-Auguste Pictet ("Sciences & Arts"), Charles Pictet de Rochemont ("Literature"), and Frédéric-Guillaume Maurice ("Agriculture").

This journal was succeeded in 1816 by the Bibliothèque universelle des sciences, belles-lettres, et arts, which kept the same editors until 1824–25 and was also published in three series, one focusing on science and techniques, another on literature, and a third one on agriculture.

After Pictet's death (1825), the periodical was taken over by Georges Maurice (1799–1839) and Pictet de Rochemont's two sons, soon joined by a group of Genevan scholars including Etienne Dumont, Pellegrino Rossi, Jacob Frederic Lullin de Châteauvieux, as well as Augustin Pyramus de Candolle and Auguste De la Rive for the scientific part.

In 1836, the two main series, science and literature, were merged for a period of ten years under the leadership of Auguste De la Rive and given the name of Bibliothèque universelle de Genève. In 1846, the periodical was divided again between a series on literature, which kept the name of Bibliothèque universelle and a series on science, which took the name of Archives des sciences physiques et naturelles.

The Bibliothèque universelle went through many changes, which did not prevent its encyclopedic formula to become gradually obsolete. It disappeared in 1924.

The Archives des sciences physiques et naturelles were edited until the first World War by Genevan men of science such as Auguste De la Rive, François-Jules Pictet-De la Rive (1809–1872), Casimir Pyrame de Candolle (1836–1918) and Edouard Sarasin (1843–1917). Renamed Archives des sciences in 1947, this periodical maintained its three issues a year until 2004. It still exists today as a local and non-specialized periodical of natural history and history of science.
