= John Comstock =

John Comstock may refer to:

- John H. Comstock (1904–1993), American politician and attorney from Nebraska
- John Henry Comstock (1849–1931), American entomologist
- John Lee Comstock (1787–1858) American surgeon and educator
- John Comstock, a minor character in The Baroque Cycle novels
- John Comstock, the last living person removed from the stack of logs in the 1999 Aggie Bonfire collapse
