= Charles Bonnet =

Genevan botanist (1720–1793)

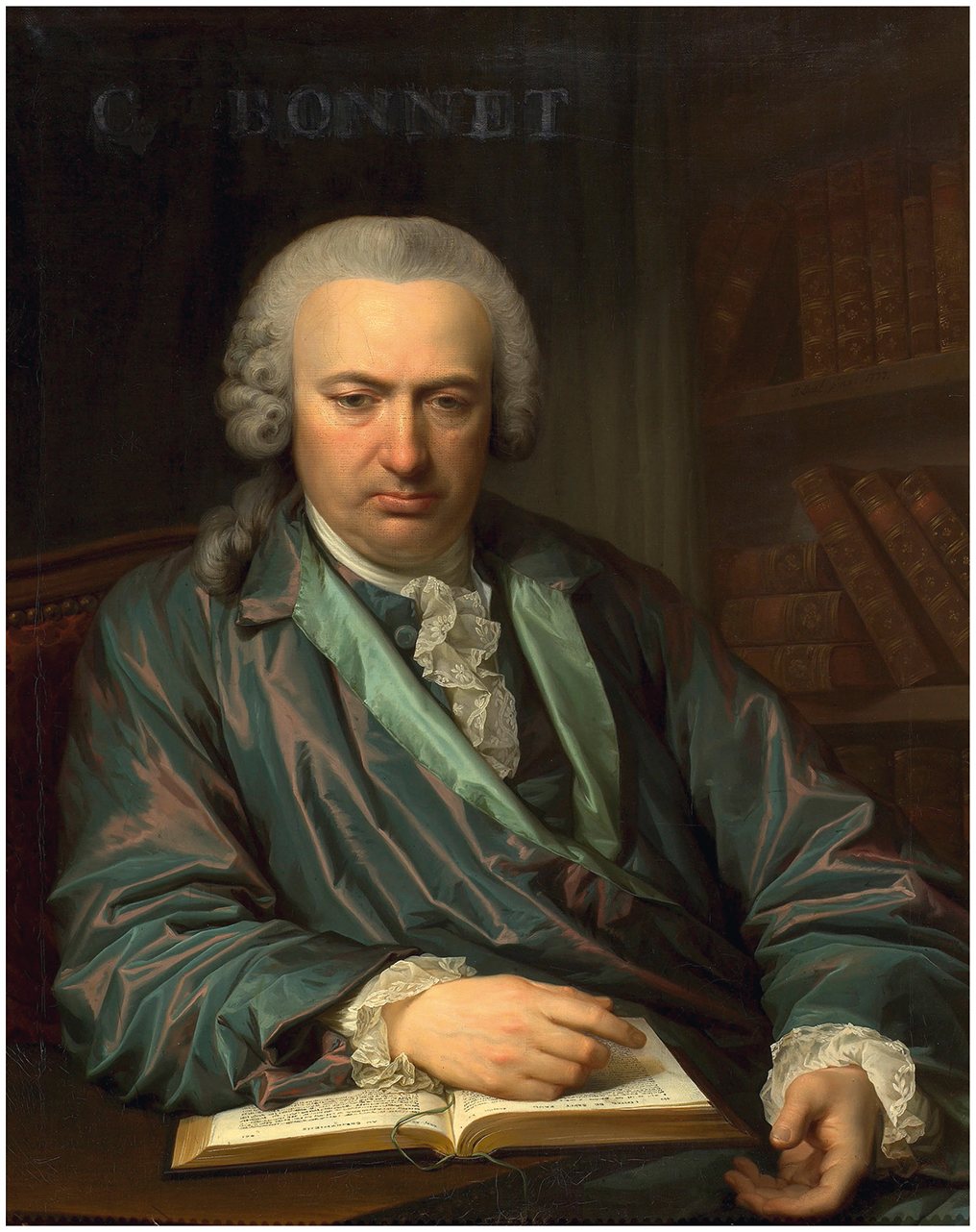
- Bonnet painted by Jens Juel, 1777.
- Born: 13 March 1720; Geneva, Republic of Geneva
- Died: 20 May 1793 (aged 73); Genthod, Republic of Geneva
- Known for: Phyllotaxis
- Scientific career
- Fields: Naturalist

Charles Bonnet (French: [ʃaʁl bɔnɛ]; 13 March 1720 – 20 May 1793) was a Genevan (Note: Bonnet is sometimes held to be Swiss (see e.g. his entry in the Encyclopædia Britannica), but the independent Republic of Geneva where he lived only joined the Swiss Confederacy on 19 May 1815.) naturalist and philosophical writer. He is responsible for coining the term phyllotaxis to describe the arrangement of leaves on a plant. He was among the first to notice parthenogenetic reproduction in aphids and established that insects respired through their spiracles. He was among the first to use the term "evolution" in a biological context. Deaf from an early age, he also suffered from failing eyesight and had to make use of assistants in later life to help in his research.

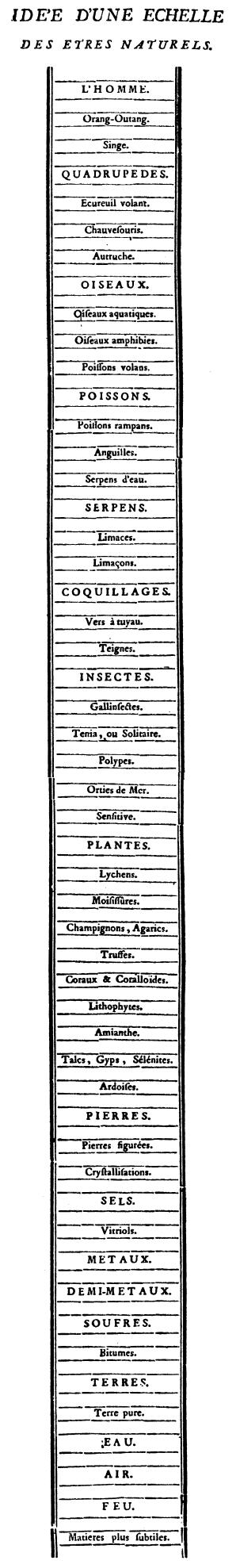
Chain of being from Traité d'insectologie, 1745

== Life and work ==
Bonnet was born in Geneva, the son of Pierre Bonnet and Anne-Marie Lullin de Châteauvieux. Although originally from France, the family had been driven into Geneva by religious persecution of Protestants in the 16th century. At age seven he lost his hearing, which pushed him into an interest in the natural world. His schoolmates troubled him due to the hearing handicap and the parents took him out and had a private tutor. Bonnet seems never to have left the Geneva region, and does not appear to have taken any part in public affairs except for the period between 1752 and 1768, during which he was a member of the republic's Council of Two Hundred. The last twenty five years of his life he spent quietly in the country, at Genthod, near Geneva, where he died after a long and painful illness on 20 May 1793. His wife was a lady of the family of De la Rive. They had no children, but Madame Bonnet's nephew, the celebrated Horace-Bénédict de Saussure, was brought up as their son.

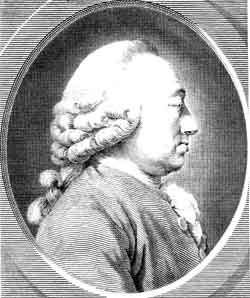

Bonnet made law his profession, but his favourite pursuit was the study of natural science. The account of the ant-lion in Noël-Antoine Pluche's Spectacle de la nature, which he read in his sixteenth year, turned his attention to insect life. He procured RAF de Réaumur's work on insects, and with the help of live specimens succeeded in adding many observations to those of Réaumur and Pluche. In 1740, Bonnet communicated to the Academy of Sciences a paper containing a series of experiments establishing what is now termed parthenogenesis in aphids or tree-lice, which obtained for him the honour of being admitted as the youngest corresponding member of the academy. During that year he had been in correspondence with his uncle Abraham Trembley who had recently discovered the hydra. This little creature became the hit of all the salons across Europe once philosophers and natural scientists saw its amazing regenerative capabilities. In 1741, Bonnet began to study reproduction by fusion and the regeneration of lost parts in the freshwater hydra and other animals; and in the following year he discovered that the respiration of caterpillars and butterflies is performed by pores, to which the name spiracles has since been given. In 1743, he was admitted a fellow of the Royal Society; and in the same year he became a doctor of laws—his last act in connection with a profession which had ever been distasteful to him. In 1753, he was elected a foreign member of the Royal Swedish Academy of Sciences, and on 15 December 1769 a foreign member of the Royal Danish Academy of Sciences and Letters.

His first published work appeared in 1745, entitled Traité d'insectologie, in which were collected his various discoveries regarding insects, along with a preface on the development of germs and the scale of organized beings. Botany, particularly the leaves of plants, next attracted his attention; and after several years of diligent study, rendered irksome by the increasing weakness of his eyesight, he published in 1754 one of the most original and interesting of his works, Recherches sur l'usage des feuilles dans les plantes (Research on the use of leaves in plants). In this book, he observes that gas bubbles form on plant leaves that have been submerged in water, indicating gas exchange; and among other things he advances many considerations tending to show (as was later done by Francis Darwin) that plants are endowed with powers of sensation and discernment. But Bonnet's eyesight, which threatened to fail altogether, caused him to turn to philosophy. In 1754 his Essai de psychologie was published anonymously in London. This was followed by the Essai analytique sur les facultés de l'âme (Analytical essay on the faculties of the soul) (Copenhagen, 1760), in which he develops his views regarding the physiological conditions of mental activity. He returned to physical science, but to the speculative side of it, in his Considerations sur les corps organisées (Amsterdam, 1762), designed to refute the theory of epigenesis, and to explain and defend the doctrine of pre-existent germs. In his Contemplation de la nature (Amsterdam, 1764–1765; translated into Italian, German, English and Dutch), one of his most popular and delightful works, he sets forth, in eloquent language, the theory that all the beings in nature form a gradual scale rising from lowest to highest, without any break in its continuity. His last important work was the Palingénésie philosophique (Geneva, 1769–1770); in it he treats of the past and future of living beings, and supports the idea of the survival of all animals, and the perfecting of their faculties in a future state. Bonnet's complete works appeared at Neuchâtel in 1779–1783, partly revised by himself.

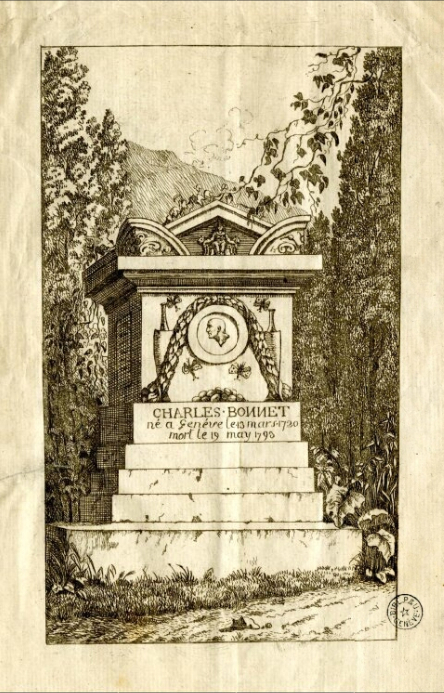
Contemporary drawing of Bonnet's tomb in what was then the Parc des Plantes, now the Parc des Bastions. It was later removed, its whereabouts unknown. From the collections of the Bibliothèque des Genève.

In 1760 he described a condition now called Charles Bonnet Syndrome, in which vivid, complex visual hallucinations (fictive visual percepts) occur in psychologically normal people. He documented it in his 87-year-old grandfather, who was nearly blind from cataracts in both eyes but perceived men, women, birds, carriages, buildings, tapestries and scaffolding patterns. Most people affected are elderly with visual impairments, however the phenomenon does not occur only in the elderly or in those with visual impairments; it can also be caused by damage elsewhere in their optic pathway or brain.

Bonnet's philosophical system may be outlined as follows. Man is a compound of two distinct substances, mind and body, the one immaterial and the other material. All knowledge originates in sensations; sensations follow (whether as physical effects or merely as sequents Bonnet will not say) vibrations in the nerves appropriate to each; and lastly, the nerves are made to vibrate by external physical stimulus. A nerve once set in motion by a particular object tends to reproduce that motion; so that when it a second time receives an impression from the same object it vibrates with less resistance. The sensation accompanying this increased flexibility in the nerve is, according to Bonnet, the condition of memory. When reflection—that is, the active element in mind—is applied to the acquisition and combination of sensations, those abstract ideas are formed which, though generally distinguished from, are thus merely sensations in combination only. That which puts the mind into activity is pleasure or pain; happiness is the end of human existence.

Bonnet's metaphysical theory is based on two principles borrowed from Leibniz: first, that there are not successive acts of creation, but that the universe is completed by the single original act of the divine will, and thereafter moves on by its own inherent force; and secondly, that there is no break in the continuity of existence. The divine Being originally created a multitude of germs in a graduated scale, each with an inherent power of self-development. At every successive step in the progress of the universe, these germs, as progressively modified, advance nearer to perfection; if some advanced and others did not there would be a gap in the continuity of the chain. Thus not man only but all other forms of existence are immortal. Nor is man's mind alone immortal; his body also will pass into the higher stage, not, indeed, the body he now possesses, but a finer one of which the germ at present exists within him. It is impossible, however, to reach absolute perfection, because the distance is infinite.

In this final proposition, Bonnet violates his own principle of continuity, by postulating an interval between the highest created being and the Divine. It is also difficult to understand whether the constant advance to perfection is performed by each individual, or only by each race of beings as a whole. There seems, in fact, to be an oscillation between two distinct but analogous doctrines—that of the constantly increasing advancement of the individual in future stages of existence, and that of the constantly increasing advancement of the race as a whole according to the successive evolutions of the globe. In Philosophical Palingesis, or Ideas on the Past and Future States of Living Beings (1770), Bonnet argued that females carry within them all future generations in a miniature form. He believed these miniature beings, sometimes called homonculi, would be able to survive even great cataclysms such as the biblical Flood; he predicted, moreover, that these catastrophes brought about evolutionary change, and that after the next disaster, men would become angels, mammals would gain intelligence, and so on.

Bonnet had an influence on other philosophers and pre-evolutionary thinkers; James Burnett, Lord Monboddo is known to have studied his publications on insects and to have been influenced as he developed concepts on progression of species (evolution).

== Works ==
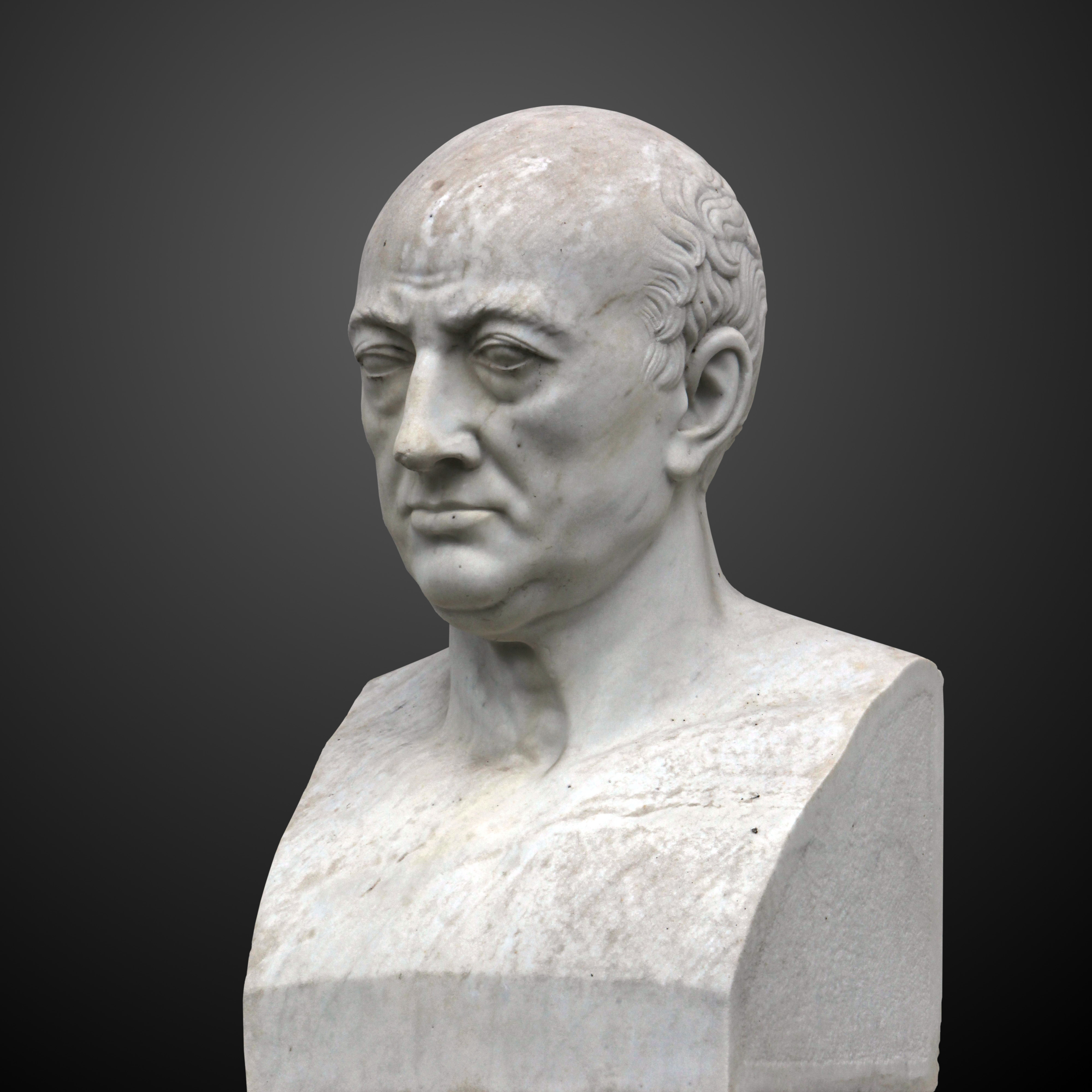
Bust of Charles Bonnet by James Pradier, on display on the grounds of the Geneva Botanical Garden.

=== Books ===
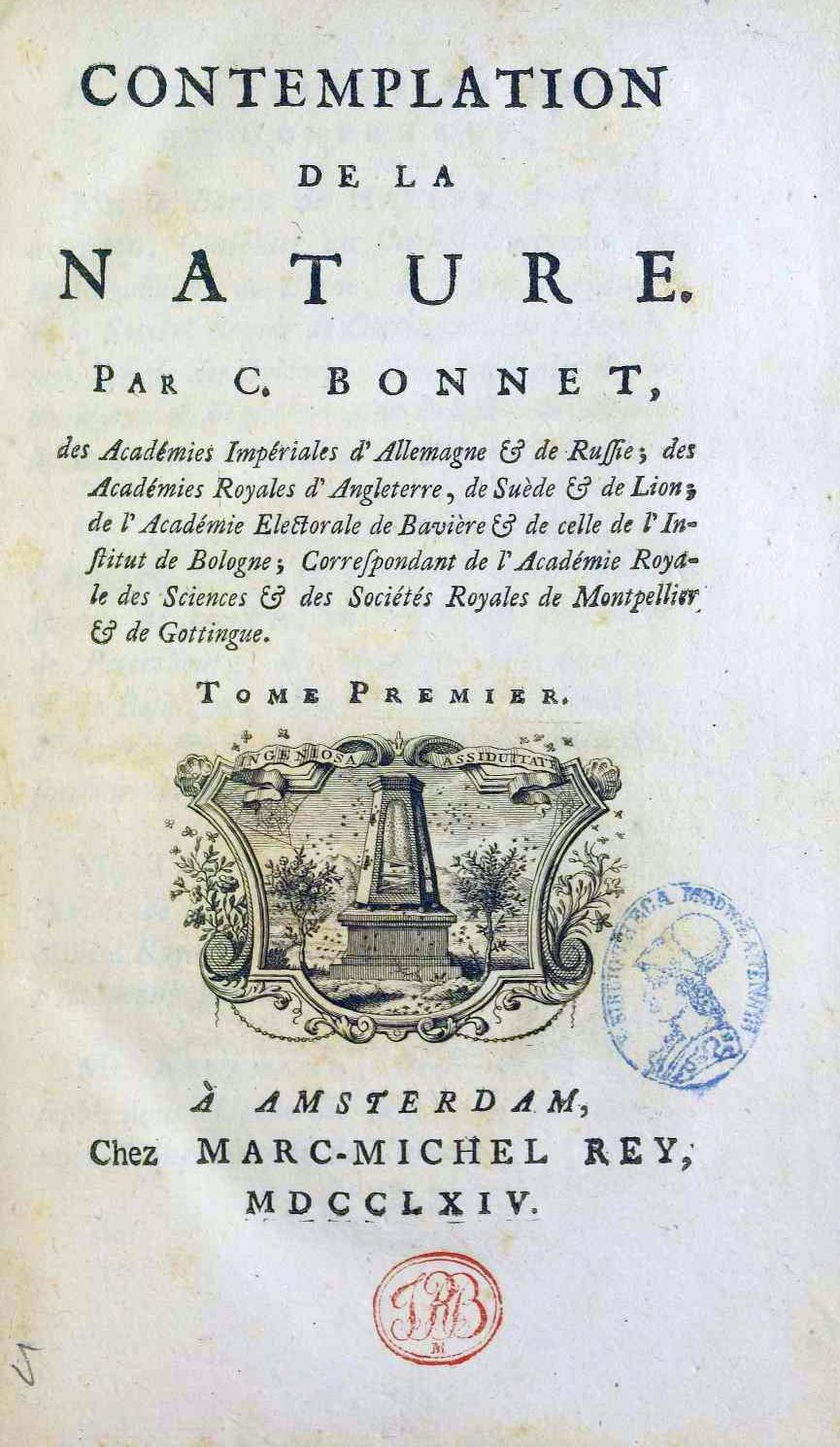
Contemplation de la nature, 1764

- Traité d'insectologie ou Observations sur quelques espèces de vers d'eau douce, qui coupés par morceaux, deviennent autant d'animaux complets, 1745.
- Recherches sur l'usage des feuilles dans les plantes, 1754.
- Essai de psychologie, 1754.
- Essai analytique sur les facultés de l'âme, 1760.
- Considérations sur les corps organisés, two volumes, 1762
  - Considerations sur les corps organisés (in French). Vol. 3. Neuchâtel: Samuel Fauche. 1779.
- Contemplation de la nature, two volumes, 1764. A German translation was made by Jakob Friedrich Klemm.
  - Contemplation de la nature (in French). Vol. 1. Amsterdam: Marc Michel Rey. 1764.
  - Contemplation de la nature (in French). Vol. 2. Amsterdam: Marc Michel Rey. 1764.
  - Contemplation de la nature (in French). Vol. 4. Neuchâtel: Samuel Fauche. 1781.
  - Contemplation de la nature (in French). Vol. 4. Neuchâtel: Samuel Fauche. 1781.
  - Contemplation de la nature (in German). Leipzig: Johann Friedrich Junius. 1772.
- La palingénésie philosophique [archive], 1769. An English translation of certain portions of the Palingénésie philosophique was published in 1787, under the title Philosophical and Critical Inquiries concerning Christianity.
- Œuvres d'histoire naturelle et de philosophie, 8 volumes 1779–1783.
- Mémoires autobiographiques, Paris, Vrin, 1948.
- Mémoires d'histoire naturelle (in French). Vol. 2. Neuchâtel: Samuel Fauche. 1779.
- Ecrits d'histoire naturelle (in French). Vol. 5. Neuchâtel: Samuel Fauche. 1781.
- Lettres sur divers sujets d'histoire naturelle (in French). Vol. 5. Neuchâtel: Samuel Fauche. 1781.
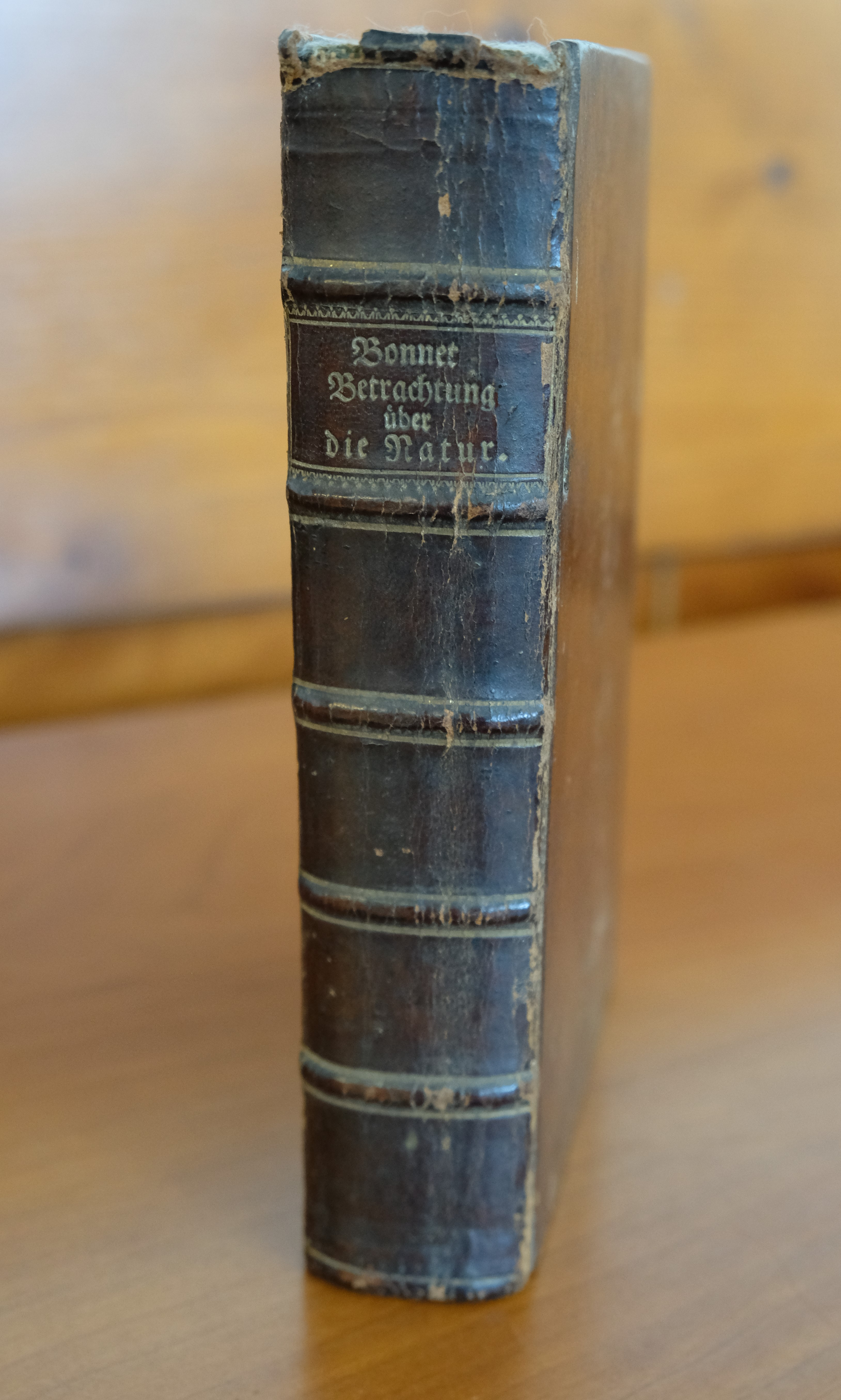
1766 German edition of Contemplation de la Nature, or, Betrachtung über die Natur, translated by Johann Daniel Titius

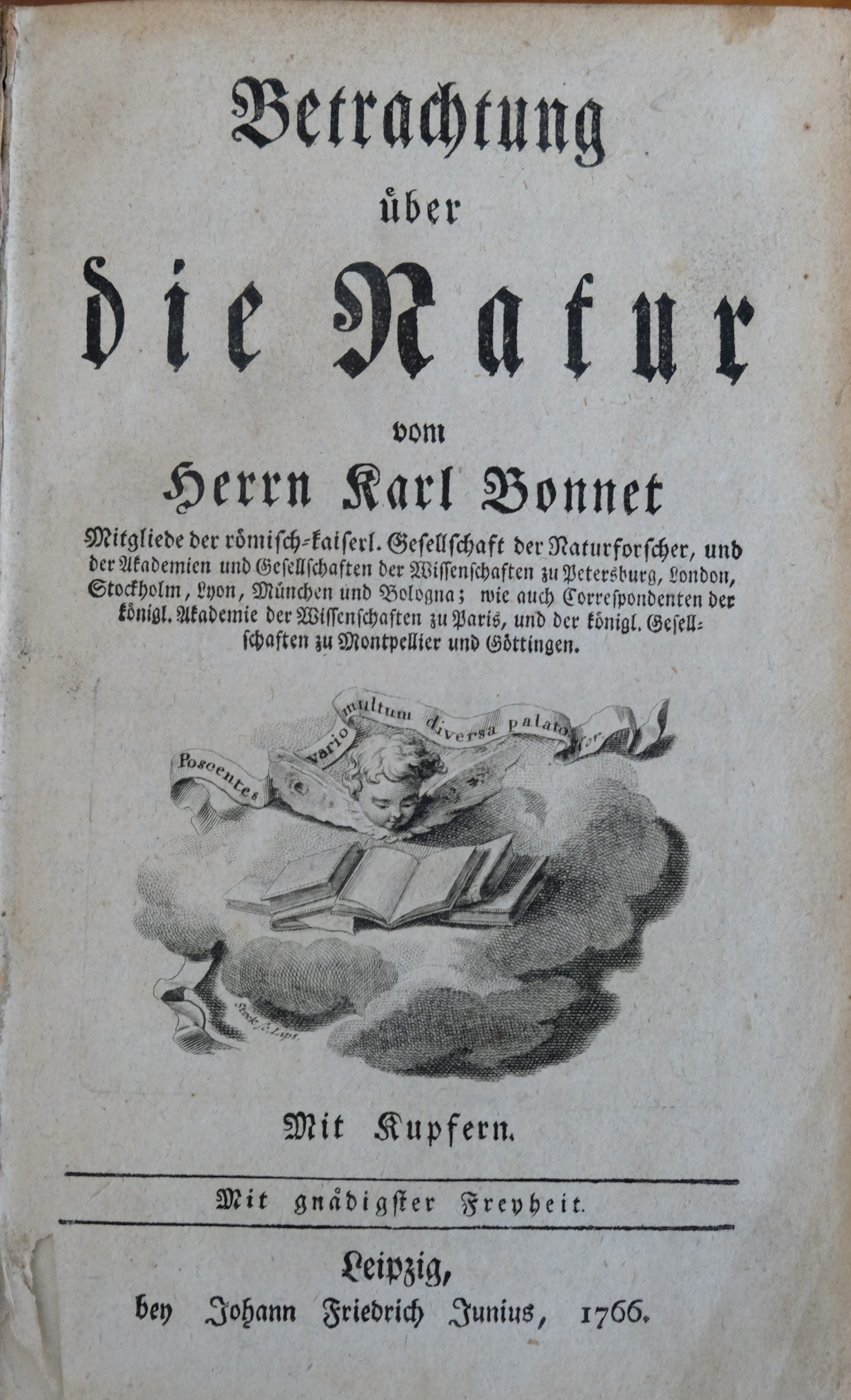
First page of the 1766 German edition of Contemplation de la Nature, or, Betrachtung über die Natur, translated by Johann Daniel Titius

=== Correspondence ===
- Lettre de M. Charles Bonnet. Au sujet du discours de M. J. J. Rousseau de Genève, sur l'origine et les fondements de l'inégalité parmi les hommes. Reproduction, in Rousseau's Works, of Bonnet's letter published in the Mercure de France.
- Two letters in French from Bonnet to Lazzaro Spallanzani.
- Jean-Paul Nicolas, La correspondance Charles Bonnet—Michel Adanson, Paris, Bibliothèque Nationale, 1969
- Letters published by the Duke of Caraman, including an exchange with Gabriel Cramer on human freedom.

== Bibliography ==
=== Biography ===
- A Lemoine, Charles Bonnet (Paris, 1850)
- Victor Antoine Charles de Riquet de Caraman, Charles Bonnet, philosophe et naturaliste (Paris, 1859)
- Max Offner, Die Psychologie Charles Bonnet (Leipzig, 1893);
- Joh. Speck, in Arch. f. Gesch. d. Philos x. (1897), xi. (1897), pp. 58 foIl., Xi. (1898) pp. 1–211
- Jean Trembley, Vie privée et littéraire de Charles Bonnet, 1794.

=== Secondary work ===
- Isaac Salomon Anspach, Discours du citoyen Isaac Salomon Anspach, prononcé le jeudi 8 d'août 1793 l'an 2 de l'Égalité, après le placement de l'inscription en l'honneur de Charles Bonnet.
- Peter J. Bowler, " Bonnet and Buffon : theories of generation and the problem of species", dans Journal for the history of biology, 6, 1973, p. 259-281.
- Marino Buscaglia and René Sigrist (ed), " Charles Bonnet, savant et philosophe (1720-1793)". Actes du Colloque international de Genève (25-27 novembre 1993) , Genève, 1994 (Mémoires de la Société de physique et d'histoire naturelle de Genève, vol. 47).
- Jacques Marx, Charles Bonnet contre les Lumières (1738-1850), Oxford, The Voltaire Foundation, 1976 (2 vol.)
- Georges Cuvier and Madeleine de Saint-Agy, "De Bonnet et de ses travaux", Histoire des sciences naturelles : depuis leur origine jusqu'à nos jours, Volume 4, 1843, p. 244–263.
- Raymond Savioz, La philosophie de Charles Bonnet de Genève, Paris, Vrin, 1948.
- René Sigrist, " L'expérimentation comme rhétorique de la preuve : l'exemple du Traité d'insectologie de Charles Bonnet", in Revue d'Histoire des Sciences, 54/4, 2001, p. 419–449.
- René Sigrist, La Nature à l'épreuve. Les débuts de l'expérimentation à Genève (1670-1790), Paris, Classiques Garnier, 2011, p. 225-263, 292-309 et 536-576.
