= Jane Marcet =

English educational writer (1769–1858)

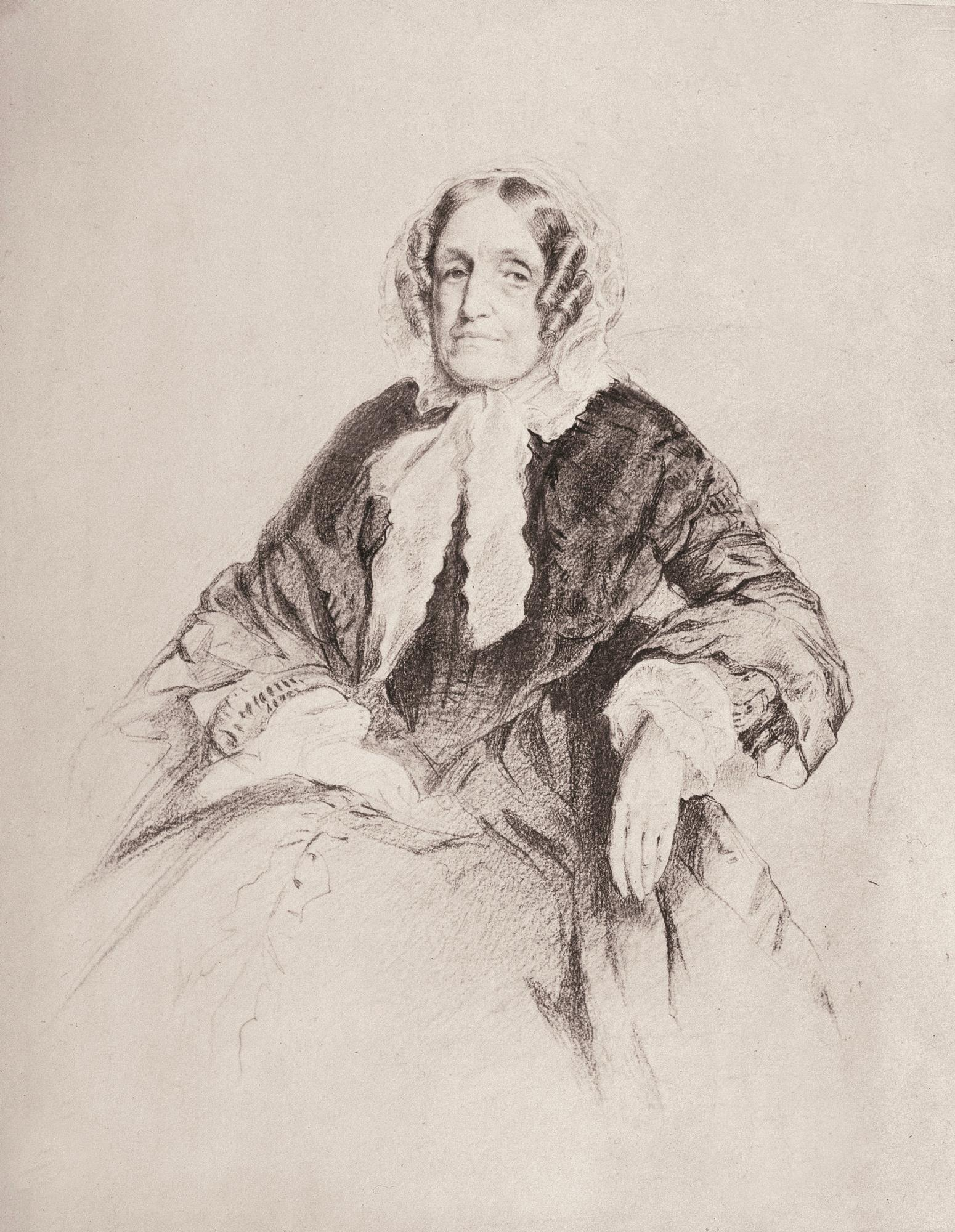
- Born: January 1, 1769; London, England
- Died: June 28, 1858 (aged 89); London, England
- Scientific career
- Fields: Chemistry

Jane Marcet (/ˈmɑːrsɛt/; née Haldimand; 1 January 1769 – 28 June 1858) was an English salonnière of Republic of Geneva descent, and an innovative writer of popular, explanatory science books. She also broke ground with Conversations on Political Economy (1816), which explain the ideas of Adam Smith, Thomas Malthus and David Ricardo.

== Life ==
Jane Marcet was born in London on 1 January 1769, one of twelve children of a wealthy Genevan merchant and banker, Anthony Francis Haldimand (1740/41–1817), and his wife Jane (died 1785). She was educated at home with her brothers. Her studies included Latin (essential for the sciences), chemistry, biology and history, as well as topics more usual for young ladies in England. She took over the running of the family at age 15, after her mother's death, managing the house and helping to bring up her younger siblings. She also acted as her father's hostess, helping to entertain frequent parties of scientific and literary guests. She developed an early interest in painting during a visit to Italy with her father in 1796, and studied with Joshua Reynolds and Thomas Lawrence. Her artistic training later enabled her to illustrate her books.

Her younger brother William Haldimand (1784–1862) became a director of the Bank of England and a member of Parliament.

She was married in 1799 to Alexander John Gaspard Marcet (1770–1822), a political exile from Geneva, Switzerland who graduated from medical school at the University of Edinburgh as a physician in 1797. After their marriage, the Marcets continued to live in London. They had four children, one of whom, François Marcet (1803–1883), became a well-known physicist.

Alexander was strongly interested in chemistry, and became a lecturer at Guy's Hospital in London and a Fellow of the Royal Society. When Jane became interested in learning more about chemistry, they conducted experiments together in a home laboratory, discussing the scientific principles involved.

The Marcets belonged in a literary and scientific social circle of leading writers and scientists, such as Mary Somerville, Henry Hallam, Harriet Martineau, Auguste Arthur de la Rive and Maria Edgeworth. Novelist Maria Edgeworth described their home in her letters, with lively, intelligent children and a welcome for visitors. One Edgeworth anecdote gives a vivid picture of the Marcet family and its scientific and social activities:

"We came here last Friday, and have spent our time most happily with our excellent friend Mrs. Marcet. His children are all so fond of Dr. Marcet, we see that he is their companion and friend. They have all been happily busy in making a paper fire-balloon, sixteen feet in diameter, and thirty feet high. A large company were invited to see it mount."

Marcet and her father were close throughout their lives. He lived with her and her husband after their marriage. When her father died in 1817, she received a substantial legacy that enabled Alexander Marcet to give up his medical practice and devote himself to chemistry full-time. Alexander in his turn understood and supported his wife's need for intellectual engagement and productive work.

== "Conversations" ==
After helping to read the proofs of one of her husband's books, Marcet decided to write her own. She produced expository books on chemistry, botany, religion and economics under the general title "Conversations". In her prefaces, Marcet addresses whether such knowledge is suitable for women, arguing against objections and stating that public opinion supports her view.

The first was written in 1805, though not issued until 1819, as Conversations on Natural Philosophy. It covered the basics of scientific knowledge of the time: physics, mechanics, astronomy, the properties of fluids, air and optics. It set a common format for her works: a dialogue between two pupils, Caroline and Emily (or Emilie), and their teacher, Mrs. Bryant (Mrs. B). Caroline, the younger, asks flippant questions that still move the dialogue along, while Emily is more controlled and reflective. Mrs. Bryant is a maternal mentoring figure, who leads them to question and examine their ideas. Both the scientific content and the discursive process of sharing scientific knowledge were important to Marcet's readers.

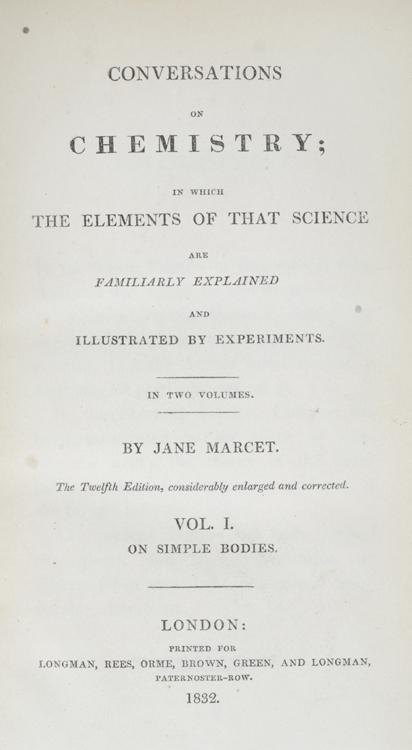
Conversations on Chemistry, Title page, Twelfth edition, 1832. Chemical Heritage Foundation

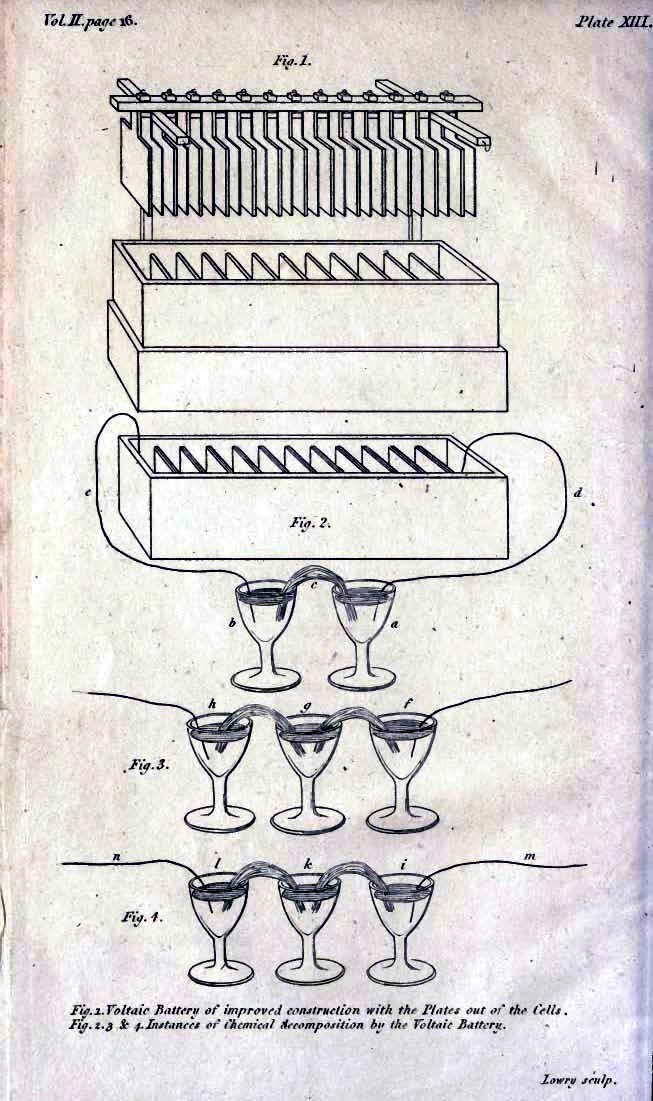
Plate from Jane Marcet's Conversations on Chemistry

Marcet's next book, Conversations on Chemistry, Intended More Especially for the Female Sex appeared anonymously in 1805, and became her best known work. In summarizing and popularising the work of Humphry Davy, whose lectures she attended, it was one of the first elementary science textbooks. It came with Marcet's drawings of chemical apparatus and stressed the need for experiment and for theoretical rigour. Jane Marcet was not explicitly identified as the author until the 12th edition of 1832. The book went into 16 editions in England, where it was an early inspiration for the young Michael Faraday. It was widely plagiarised in America, appearing there in at least 23 editions.

Marcet in her Conversations on Political Economy (1816) also popularised the arguments of such political economists as Adam Smith, Malthus, and above all David Ricardo. This was well received and widely read, though some later economists such as Alfred Marshall were dismissive, to the detriment of its later reputation, and Joseph Schumpeter derided it as "economics for schoolgirls." The purpose, however, was an important one that went beyond the lucrative demands of a niche market. Mrs B's flippant pupil Caroline says she would have thought a woman could be excused ignorance of that topic. Mrs B replies tartly, "When you plead in favour of ignorance, there is a strong presumption that you are in the wrong." Marcet's Conversations on Political Economy were an inspiration to Harriet Martineau to introduce economic topics into her writings.

In 1820 the Marcets travelled to Geneva, Switzerland, intending to relocate there. In 1822, Alexander died unexpectedly while on a visit to Britain, to Jane's extreme distress. She went through one of several periods of depression that affected her life, described by her friend Auguste de La Rive as a "shadow enveloping an energetic and active spirit." She retained strong ties to her Swiss friends, but eventually returned to live in England. There she remained active in scientific circles, and updated and published new editions of her major works throughout her life. Her last edition of "Conversations on Chemistry" appeared when she was 84. In later life, Marcet wrote new works mainly for children, perhaps with her grandchildren in mind. Mary's Grammar (1835) became a classic.

Marcet lived for the latter part of her life with a daughter, at 14 Stratton Street, Piccadilly, London. She died there on 28 June 1858.

== Legacy ==
Marcet's major contribution was her work as an educator. Her work contained few original ideas, but rested on careful study of current theories and voluminous ongoing correspondence with current scientists. It was noted for precision, accuracy and thoroughness. She presented science and economics in an informal way, but her simple introductions to often complex subjects were widely appreciated by adults as well as children. Perhaps most importantly, they reached women, including students in prominent women's seminaries, who had not been encouraged to explore the experimental sciences at the time.

Marcet was qualified to popularise chemistry and economics by her contacts with many various thinkers and scientists of her day. She was vital in the new fields of chemistry and political economy. By writing in discursive English, she made scientific knowledge accessible not only to women, but to men not trained in the fundamental languages of a classical education, Latin and Greek. While her original intent was to educate women, she reached a broader audience in line with enlightenment ideals, and laid claim to the natural sciences as a public endeavour.

When the Boston Girls' High and Normal School became the first school in America to teach science to women through laboratory experience, in 1865, Marcet's Conversations on Chemistry was the text chosen. Her works remained standard textbooks for several decades. When Henry James wrote The Turn of the Screw in 1898, one of his characters, the governess, refers offhandedly to a text being "as impersonal as Mrs. Marcet or nine-times-nine."

=== Intellectual legacy ===
One of those who read her work was Michael Faraday, born in 1791, who would become one of the world's greatest scientists, revolutionizing physics and chemistry. He was impressed by her work on chemistry, which helped him to find a new calling for science. He later claimed it had played a vital role in his own career as a chemist.

Faraday remarked, "When I came to know Mrs. Marcet personally; how often I cast my thoughts backwards, delighting to connect the past and the present; how often, when sending a paper to her as a thank you offering, I thought of my first instructress."

The book aimed to help others who were bewildered by chemistry by explaining better but remaining scientifically accurate. It was a user-friendly book. The subjects were divided into two parts, each of more than 300 pages. It is framed by conversations between an adult teacher and two children. Marcet also added her own figures to explain chemistry in an easy way. In England, 16 editions of Conversations on Chemistry were published up to the 1830s, with all-inclusive updates. She influenced many individuals all over the world. Girls and others who were not wealthy were pursuing the subject, and able to get along with it.

Marcet's active support for teaching chemistry to beginners through an experimental laboratory was recognized by many. After the Civil War, laboratory instruction was becoming the norm in American schools. Despite competition from many other authors and books, Marcet's ruled in the female advancement of knowledge. Its popularity even in the early 1900s suggests increasing acceptance by American schools to including basic subjects of theoretical and experimental science in the education of females. This availability of education set the platform for increasing women's engagements in science. She inspired many of the greatest chemists, scientists and Mathematicians in history. Mary Somerville, born in 1790, the mathematician after whom The University of Oxford's first women's college was named, said of Marcet: “No one at this time can duly estimate the importance of Mrs Marcet’s scientific works.”

The book remained popular in the United States partly through the publishing of nearly two dozen derivative editions by John Lee Comstock and others. Lack of international copyright laws at the time meant that Marcet did not control or receive payment for these editions. Having become a standard textbook in Britain and United States, it was translated into German and French. In the United States, Boston's Girls' High School and Normal School became the first school to teach science to women through laboratory experience, in 1865, based on the text of Marcet's Conversations on Chemistry.

Marcet was inspired by the work economists of David Ricardo, Adam Smith and many others. Conversations on Political Economy notably drew attention to the arguments based on notable works by some famous economists. It targeted the general idea of economics with liberating and educating poor people, irrespective of sex. It also embraced general notions of political economy with the distribution of property, taxes, the division of labour, on capital, and on the wages, population and social predicament of the poor.

In a letter to Pierre Prevost, Marcet stated, "I can assure you that the greatest pleasure I derive from success is the hope of doing good by the propagation of useful truths amongst a class of people, who, excepting in a popular familiar form, would never have become acquainted with them."

The book became a popular read, although some later economists like Alfred Marshall showed indifference to it, which damaged her reputation. Joseph Schumpeter mocked it as "economics for schoolgirls". The aim of her book was an important one that went beyond the moneymaking for small markets. It was intended to popularize the lessons of political economy for the self-improving working classes and school curricula. It attempted to simplify the economics for the fewer, privileged audience and educate younger people in the principle of economics by which markets are regulated, using simple tales. Marcet's Conversations on Political Economy inspired Harriet Martineau, a British social theorist and Whig writer often cited as the first female sociologist, to introduce economic topics into her writings. She was inspired to teach the principles of economics not by pressing them into a story, but by displaying their natural workings in selected phases of life. It followed a style resembling that of her previous book and likewise became popular.

Marcet inherited considerable properties from her father in 1817. She and her husband moved to Geneva in the 1820s, but two years later Alexander died. She eventually returned in London, where she again drew together prominent intellectuals and bankers. Her later works largely focus on less-demanding topics and were intended in most cases for a younger audience.

Further success came with the 1819 publication of Conversations on Natural Philosophy, which she had written before Conversations on Chemistry. She did not acknowledge herself as author until 1832. Her other notable books in the period included Mary's Grammar (1835).

Marcet's early anonymity left it open for male authors in the United States to supplement and issue their editions of Jane's work in their own invented language and place their names on the book's title page as authors. When Marcet published the 12th edition under her own name, it created a situation of chaos among the published books, but nothing happened in the end. Lack of international copyright laws meant she never received royalties for any US editions under the names of other authors.

Marcet went on to publish several other popular works, including Conversations on Political Economy and Conversations on Plant Physiology, but none became as widely read as Conversations on Chemistry. With each successive edition, Marcet continued to update the book. She wrote to Michael Faraday in 1845, an esteemed writer and a member of the prestigious Royal Society, for detailed and expanded information on his research. He presented his latest breakthroughs to the woman who had first set him on his chemical journey.

=== Scholarship and popularisation ===
Marcet spread knowledge by easing its creation, sharing and use. She created and maintained social and intellectual ties among scientists, elites, literary writers, economists and the wider public. She worked on the boundaries of various objects of discussion, from which knowledge flowed in all directions. Those showing respect for her ideas on political economy included Thomas Robert Malthus and James Mill.

Willie Henderson tried to frame Jane as an educational broker, arguing that to change the perspectives of others' minds was "mere capitalist propaganda" for "sophisticated curriculum development".

For Jane, communication was not a one-way activity. It conveyed a message and made the public aware of the ideas of professionals, who in turn were provided with new challenges by her facilitation of two-way communication. She brought a deep perception of classical economics to bear on social questions by counterposing the "prejudices and popular feeling of uninformed benevolence". Furthermore, she introduced the insights of continental thinkers into the writings of the English classical school, so challenging them to decide what was peripheral and what central to the story. This included consolidating the ideas of bankers, political actors and business people as professional political economists.

Marcet kept herself distant from people with central dogmas of classical economics, but kept the conversation going with the masters of them. She was tough about accepting criticism, but at other times kept her directions to herself. While teaching wisdom through professionals to the untaught public, she also built up the networks that focused on her direct engagement to transmit the conversation to the people.

Marcet's Conversations on Political Economy appeared in 14 editions and was translated into Dutch, German, Spanish, and twice French. It had a strong impact on young writers and popularisers like Harriet Martineau, Jean-Baptiste Say, Millicent Garrett Fawcett, on great political economists such as Malthus, JS Mill and many more, and on politicians and bankers with whom she had social ties. This made her one of the great early 1900s popularizers of political economy, her information flow being central to her work. Historically, she rests between the great female-led continental salons of the 18th century and the professional knowledge brokers of the 20th. Marcet in the 19th century helped to define the field.

Marcet lived for the rest of her life with her daughter in Piccadilly, London. She died there on 28 June 1858 leaving a legacy of her works.

== Publications ==
Jane Marcet's publications included:

- Marcet, Jane (1806). Conversations on Chemistry, in which the elements of that science are familiarly explained and illustrated by experiments. London: Longman, Hurst, Rees & Orme. OCLC 1063048051. (first edition published anonymously)
  - 2nd edition in two volumes, London 1817:
    - volume I: On Simple Bodies.
    - volume II: On Compound Bodies.
  - 5th edition, London 1817.
- —— (1816). Conversations on Political Economy; in which the Elements of that Science are familiarly explained. London: Longman, Hurst, Rees, Orme and Brown. OCLC 1559416324.
- —— (1819). Conversations on Natural Philosophy, in which the Elements of that Science are familiarly explained. London: Longman, Hurst, Rees, Orme and Brown. OCLC 682275072.
- Mary's Grammar (1835)
- John Hopkins's Notions on Political Economy (1833)
- Mrs Marcet's Story-Book: Being a Selection from the Stories Contained in Her Books for Little Children (1858)
- The seasons, stories for very young children, by the author of 'Conversations on chemistry' (1832)
- Willy's Grammar
- Pamphlet Essays: Under the Superintendence of the Society for the Improvement of the Working Population in the County of Glamorgan
- Mrs Marcet's Story-Book
- Controlling State Crime
- Bertha's Visit to her Uncle in England. By Jane Marcet (1830)
- Conversations on the History of England, for the Use of Children (1842)
- Conversations on the Evidence of Christianity in Which the Leading Arguments of the Best Authors Are Arranged, Developed, and Connected with Each Other for the Use of Young Persons and Theological Students
- The Seasons; Stories for Very Young Children; Spring. Vol. II
- Conversations on Vegetable Physiology: Volume 1: Comprehending the Elements of Botany, with Their Application to Agriculture
- Lessons on Animals, Vegetables, and Minerals (2015)
