= Thomas Tommasina =

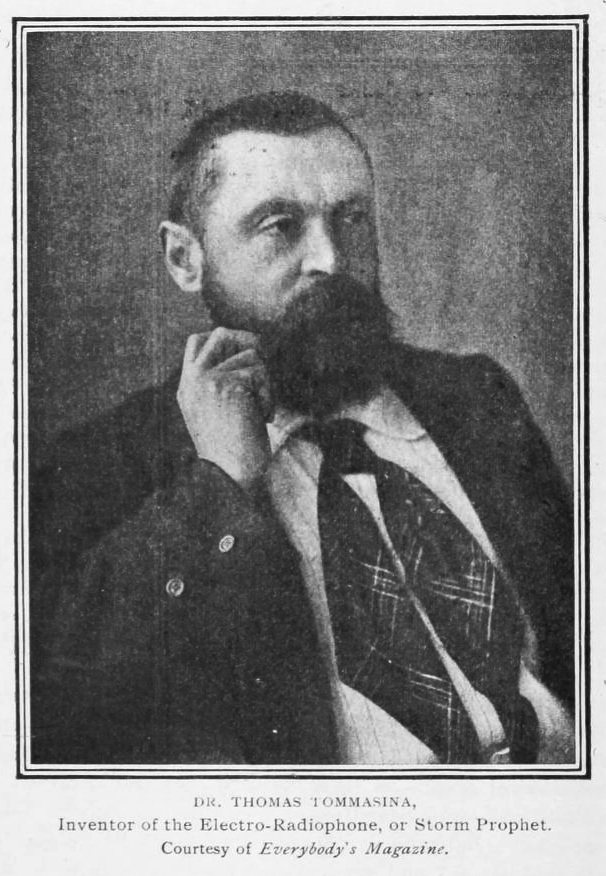

Thomas Tommasina (1855 – 29 January 1935) was an artist turned physicist who worked on atmospheric ionization and gravitational theories mainly after moving to Switzerland. An experimenter as well as a theoretician, he invented a radio-receiver-like device while studying ionospheric disturbances in the upper atmosphere and used it in long-range weather prediction.

== Early life ==
Tommasina was born in the town of Intra (today part of Verbania) on the shores of Lake Maggiore in the Kingdom of Lombardy–Venetia, then part of the Austrian Empire. In his early years, he admired the Italian school of painting, particularly that of Leonardo da Vinci.

== Education ==
Tommasina studied art. In 1885 he became inspired by the works of Alessandro Volta, took an interest in physics, and went to Geneva to study under Charles Soret. Here he worked on the physics behind the hardness of solids. Following the works of Julius Elster and Hans Friedrich Geitel he joined Édouard Sarasin in studies on the ionization of air and related phenomena. He was a doctor of science and member of the National Institute of Geneva from 1902.

== Career ==
Tommasina wrote a book on the "physics of gravitation and dynamic of the Universe" ("La Physique de la Gravitation et la Dynamique de l'Univers") in 1927. He also worked on the orbits of comets during this period. His work on gravity using wave models was founded on the idea of ether. He also wrote an introduction to a French translation of a book by Alfred Russel Wallace in 1907 - "La place de l'homme dans l'univers : études sur les résultats des recherches scientifiques, sur l'unité et la pluralité des mondes".

Tommasina invented a telephonic receiver system which he adapted as a weather forecasting system in 1901. Called the "Electro-radiophone" it picked up electric discharges in the atmosphere and transmitted them over wires to where it could be heard in the form of sound. The receiver made use of the Branly effect. It may have been one of the earliest ideas on using wireless telegraphy in meteorology. Tommasina's device had also been of interest to Guglielmo Marconi. When Marconi claimed a patent there were several counter-claims and it was suggested that the true inventor of the so-called "mercury-coherer" used in the first transatlantic telegraphy was Tommasina. Tommasina did not however use it for the purpose of wireless-telegraphy nor did he claim to be its inventor.

== Personal life ==
On 29 January 1935, Tommasina died at his villa in Champel, Geneva, Switzerland.
