= John Lee Comstock =

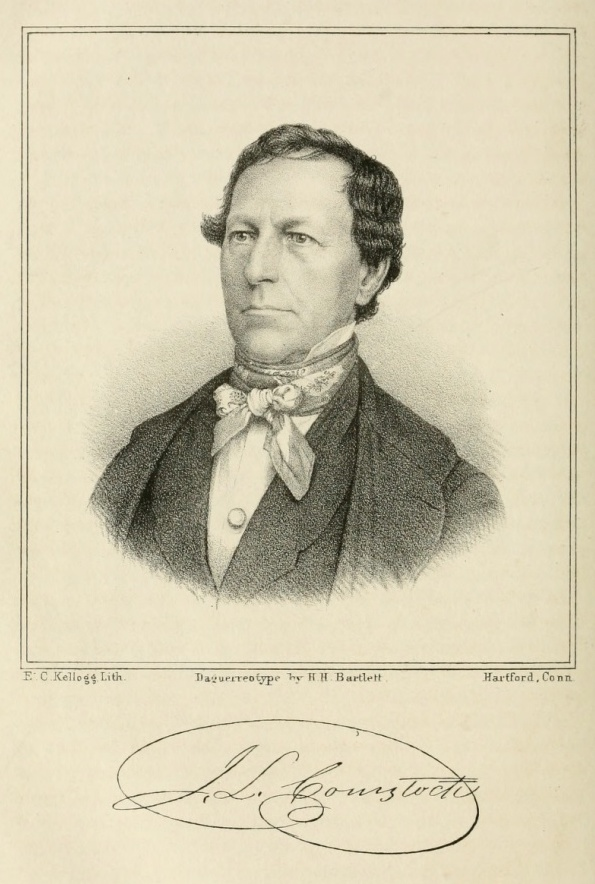
- J. L. Comstock, ca. 1852
- Born: September 25, 1787; East Lyme, Connecticut
- Died: November 21, 1858 (aged 71); Hartford, Connecticut
- Occupations: Doctor, Educator
- Spouse: Mary E. Cheneverd

John Lee Comstock (September 25, 1787, East Lyme, Connecticut – November 21, 1858, Hartford, Connecticut) was an American surgeon and educator, who served as a surgeon in the War of 1812.

Following the war, Comstock produced numerous books on science, including works on botany, chemistry, mineralogy, natural history and physiology, targeting schools and general audiences, and his books were widely used.

In the absence of international copyright law, some of his works "borrowed" heavily from European authors such as Edward Turner (Elements of Chemistry, 1827) and Jane Marcet (Conversations on Chemistry, 1806). In the same way, Comstock's works were edited and republished in England and Prussia by others.

In 1828 Comstock was issued the first patent in the United States for the waterproofing of cloth or leather.

== Family and education ==
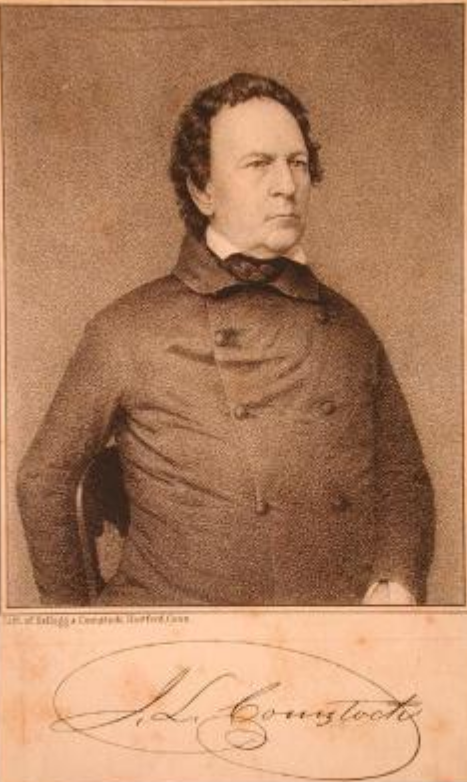
J. L. Comstock, ca. 1850

John Lee Comstock was born on September 25, 1787, in East Lyme, Connecticut, to "respectable farmer" Samuel Comstock (1747–1827) and Esther (Lee) Comstock (1750/1753-1839). He was a younger brother of Samuel Comstock (1772–1840) of Butternuts in Otsego County, New York State. His nephew Edwin Perkins Comstock (1799–1837) founded the Comstock Patent Medicine business, seller of Dr. Morse's Indian Root Pills.

John Lee Comstock received instruction in reading, writing and Daboll's Arithmetic at a local common school. Around age 20, he began to study medicine with his older brother, Dr. Joseph Comstock (b. 1777 of Lebanon, New London County, Connecticut. John Lee Comstock also attended medical lectures at Brown University in Providence, Rhode Island.

== Surgery ==
John Lee Comstock was an assistant surgeon in the original 25th Infantry Regiment of the United States Army, which was constituted to serve on the Niagara Frontier in the War of 1812. In 1815 the 25th became part of the 6th Infantry Regiment.

Comstock served at Fort Trumbull in New London, Connecticut, and in Pittsburgh, "the scene of one of the most bloody battles of that war, and ... the deposit of all the sick and wounded of the frontier Regiments." There he was responsible for three hospitals, each containing twenty to thirty patients.

Following the war, John Lee Comstock settled in Hartford, Connecticut. On May 17, 1817, he married Mary E. Cheneverd, a granddaughter of Colonel Thomas Seymour (1735–1829). They had eight children. One son, John Chenavard Comstock, became a partner in the lithographic firm of the Kellogg brothers (1848–1850). Comstock continued to practice medicine until around 1830, by which time he was fully occupied with the publication of textbooks.

== Scientific publishing ==
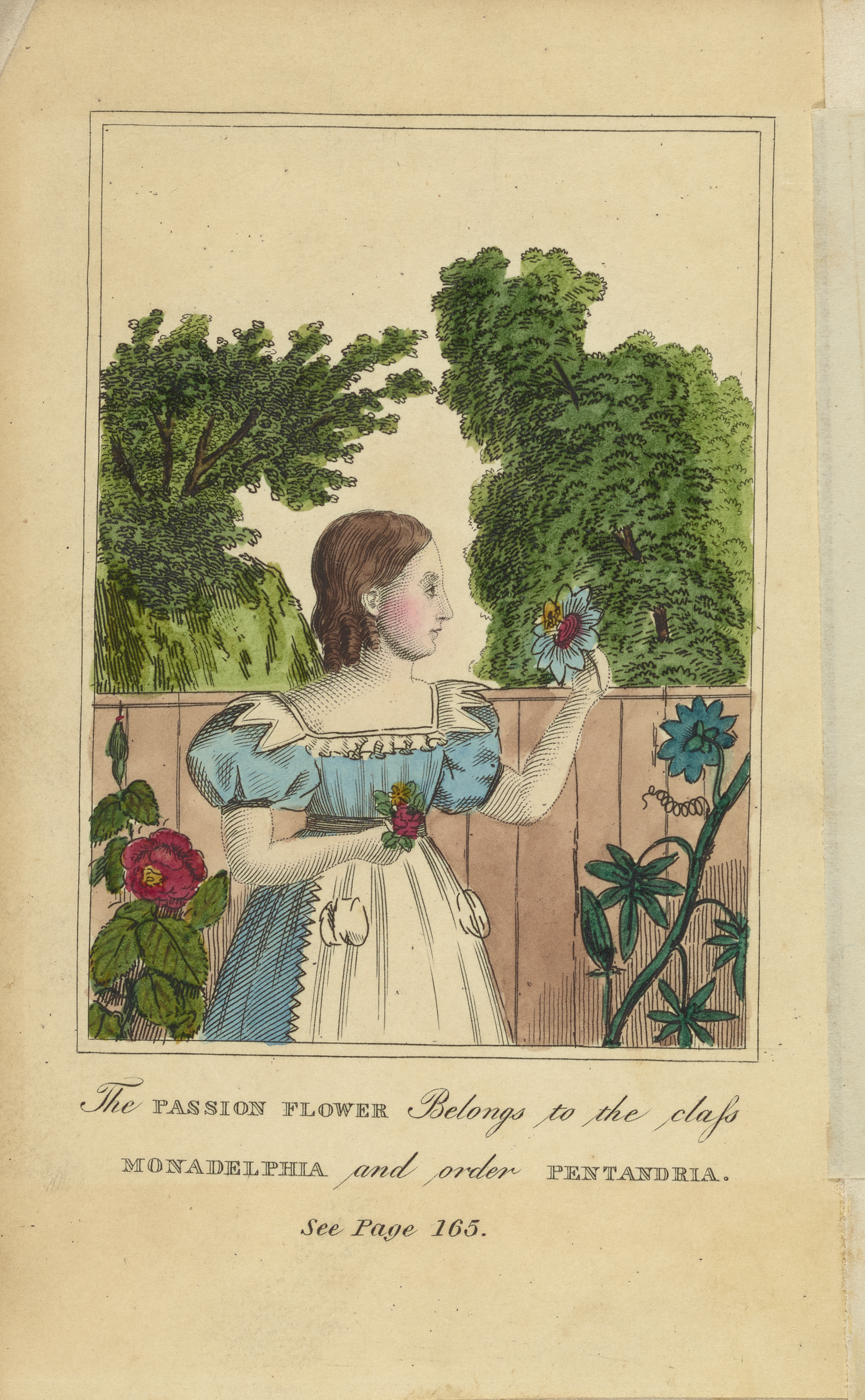
Frontispiece, The Young Botanist, 1835

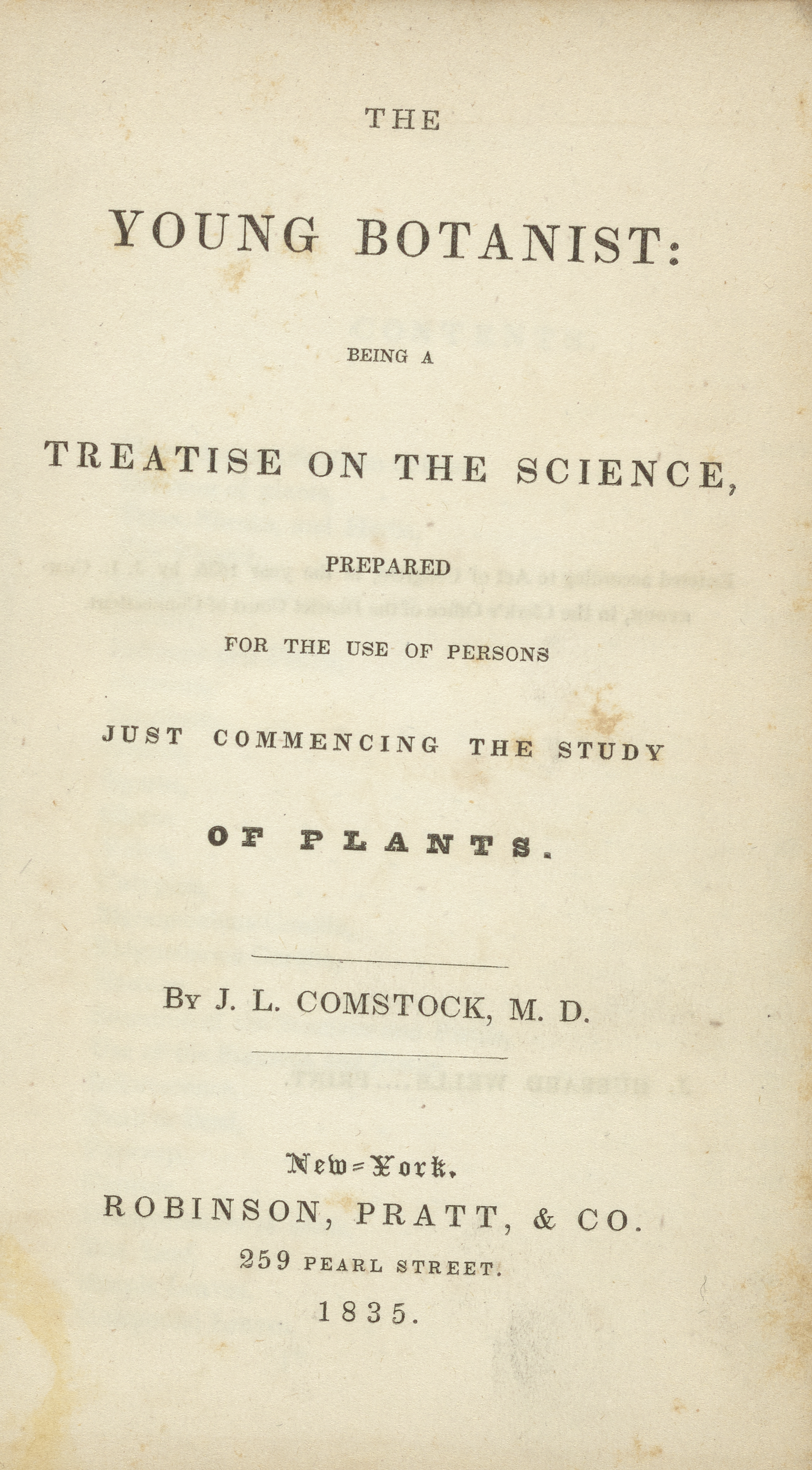
Title page, The Young Botanist, 1835

Comstock published more than 20 books, primarily on botany, chemistry, mineralogy, natural history and physiology. Most of his works were directed at schools and general audiences. Comstock received an honorary degree from Middlebury College in Vermont in 1822.

Comstock's most popular work was Natural Philosophy (1831). As of 1852, it was estimated to have sold 28–30,000 copies per year, totaling sales of over half a million copies. Next in popularity were his works on chemistry, selling around 12,000 annually, for an estimated total of 250,000 copies. His Outlines of Physiology (1836) was said to be the first text on the subject to be widely used in American schools.

=== Republication by others ===
Natural Philosophy was edited and republished by George Lees of the Scottish Naval and Military Academy in Edinburgh, Scotland. It was also edited and republished by Richard Dennis Hoblyn (1803–1886) of Balliol College, Oxford, in six parts, under the series title "Scott's first books in science". Natural Philosophy was reportedly translated into German and used in public schools in Prussia. Both Lees and Hoblyn credited Comstock as an American authority.

"Among the many works on philosophy; we have certainly not met with one, uniting in a greater degree the two grand requisites of precision and simplicity, than in the work of Dr. Comstock." – Lees

"This manual of Natural Philosophy claims no higher merit than that of being a replication of the popular treatise of Dr. Comstock, of Hartford... enlarged, and to a certain extent remodeled... It is an elementary work requiring for its perusal no mathematical attainments, nor indeed any previous knowledge of Natural Philosophy, being at once simple, intelligible, and in most parts familiar." – Hoblyn

=== Republication of others ===
Comstock drew heavily upon Edward Turner (Elements of Chemistry, 1827) in terms of structure, illustrations, and text, in his own Elements of Chemistry (1839). Other American editors did likewise; most noticeably, Lewis Caleb Beck published A Manual of Chemistry: Containing a Condensed View of the Present State of the Science (1831) and John Johnston (1806–1879) published A Manual Of Chemistry: On The Basis Of Turner's Elements Of Chemistry (1861). They explicitly acknowledged their borrowing, but given the absence of international copyright laws, the original author received no other recompense.

Comstock also published A Grammar of Chemistry On the Plan of the Rev. David Blair: Adapted to the Use of Schools and Private Students, by Familiar Illustrations and Easy Experiments Requiring Cheap and Simple Instruments (1822). Blair was really publisher Sir Richard Phillips.

Comstock was the most active editor and republisher of Jane Marcet's book Conversations on Chemistry in the United States. As "an American gentleman", he added a critical commentary in 1818 that became part of the standard format for the book in the United States from then onward. Beginning in 1822, he took credit for his critiques, with his name appearing as editor. Marcet's book went through multiple editions and became the most successful chemistry text in elementary schools in America during the first half of the 1800s. Like Turner, Marcet did not receive payment or have any editorial control over these American editions. Comstock also published edited editions of Marcet's book Conversations on Natural Philosophy (1819).

By the 1830s, Comstock had discarded Marcet's format of conversations between women, on the grounds that it was outdated. In his own Elements of Chemistry (1831) he adopted a straightforward didactic style targeted to male students. Examples from mining, assaying and tanning replaced Marcet's household applications. Perhaps as a result, Comstock's text was rarely used in girls' schools.

== Scientific research ==
On January 21, 1828, Comstock was issued a patent for the waterproofing of cloth through the making and application of a solution of India rubber dissolved in turpentine. This was the first patent granted for waterproofing of cloth or leather in the United States. Comstock's patent was referenced during the Goodyear v. Day patent case, by Daniel Webster.

== Selected publications ==
- 1827: Elements of Mineralogy: Adapted to the Use of Schools, and Private Students (Harvard University).
- 1832: An introduction to mineralogy; adapted to the use of schools and private students. Illustrated by nearly two hundred wood cuts (New York: Pratt, Woodford & co.).
- 1832, An introduction to the study of botany; in which the science is illustrated by examples of native and exotic plants... Designed for the use of schools and private students. (New York: Robinson, Pratt, & co.)
- 1835, The young botanist: being a treatise on the science prepared for the use of persons just commencing the study of plants (New York: Robinson, Pratt & Co.)
- 1836: Elements of chemistry; in which the recent discoveries in the science are included and its doctrines familiarly explained (New York: Robinson, Pratt, & Co.).
- 1841: Outlines of geology, intended as a popular treatise on the most interesting parts of the science, together with an examination of the question, whether the days of creation were indefinite periods; designed for the use of schools and general readers (New York: Robinson).
- 1843: A system of natural philosophy: in which the principles of mechanics, hydrostatics, hydraulic, pneumatics, acoustics, optics, astronomy, electricity, magnetism, steam engine, and electro-magnetism, are familiarly explained, and illustrated by more than two hundred engravings. To which are added questions for the examinations of pupils (New York: Robinson, Pratt & co.).
- 1848: Natural history of birds: with engravings on a new plan, exhibiting their comparative size, adapted to the capacities of youth, with authentic anecdotes illustrating their habits and characters, together with reflections, moral and religious, designed for Sabbath school libraries, families, and common schools (New York: Pratt, Woodford).
- 1850: Outlines of physiology, both comparative and human: in which are described the mechanical, animal, vital, and sensorial organs and functions, also, the application of these principles to muscular exercise, and female fashions and deformities: intended for the use of schools and heads of families: together with a synopsis of human anatomy... (New York: Pratt, Woodford).
