= Bibliothèque Britannique =

Swiss monthly journal

The Bibliothèque Britannique was a monthly journal of the sciences and the arts published in Geneva by Marc-Auguste Pictet, his younger brother Charles, and their friend Frédéric-Guillaume Maurice.

Created in 1796, it covered a wide range of scientific, literary, moral and economic topics. It was divided into two series, one for science ("sciences & arts") and one for literature, plus a supplement for agriculture. Each series had a monthly issue, agriculture being a quarterly. It was originally intended to provide the scholars and men of letters of Europe with French excerpts of scientific and literary publications from the British Isles. In the field of science and medicine it gave an extensive coverage of the works of Benjamin Thompson, Humphry Davy, John Leslie or Edward Jenner as well as many others. In the "Literature" series, authors such as Walter Scott, Jeremy Bentham or Jane Austen were presented to a French speaking audience. Casually, the main editors could rely on the help of Pierre Prevost for philosophy, Louis Odier for medicine and Gaspard De la Rive for chemistry.

Published under the same title until 1815, the Bibliothèque Britannique comprised 140 volumes, and about 45,000 pages in all.

In 1816, after the fall of Napoleon, the periodical became the Bibliothèque Universelle in order to introduce original French, German, Italian and Swiss articles as well.

== Bibliography ==
- Marc-Antonio Barblan, "Journalisme médical et échanges intellectuels au tournant du XVIIIe siècle.Le cas de la Bibliothèque Britannique(1796-1815). In: Archives des Sciences, Vol. 30/3, 1977, pp.283-398
- Marc-Antonio Barblan, "Vu de Genève: les labours au Piémont. Charles Pictet de Rochemont et la Bibliothèque Britannique. In: R.Bourrigaud et Fçs. Sigaut(eds), Nous labourons, Nantes, 1977. ISBN 978-2-912228-17-8
- David M. Bickerton, Marc-Auguste and Charles Pictet, the "Bibliothèque britannique" (1796–1815) and the dissemination of British literature and science on the Continent, Geneva, Slatkine, 1986.
- Jean Cassaigneau & Jean Rilliet, Marc-Auguste Pictet ou le rendez-vous de l'Europe universelle, 1752-1825, Genève, Slatkine, 1995.[in French]
