= Edouard Sarasin =

Swiss scientist (1843–1917)

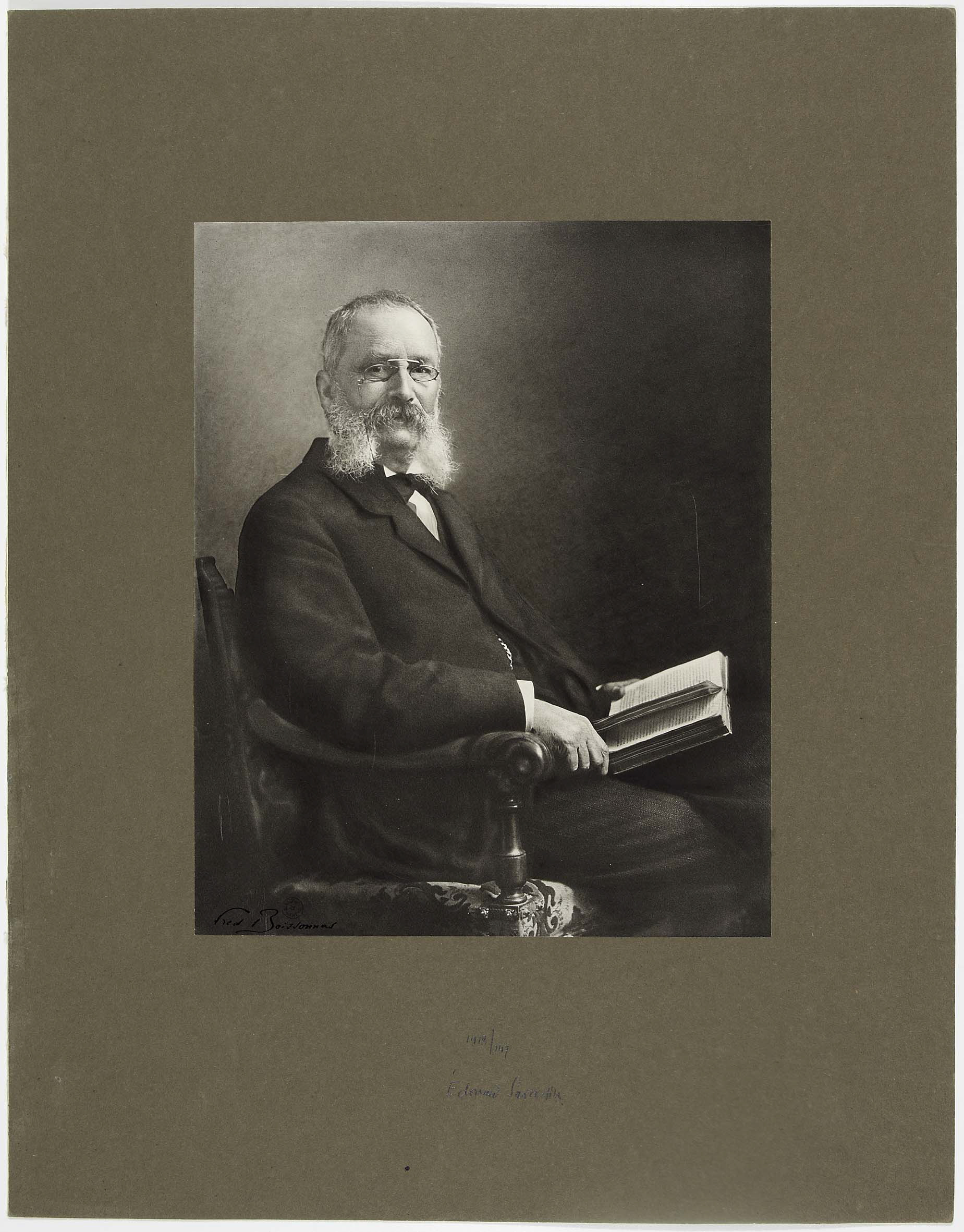
Portrait by Frédéric Boissonnas from the Bibliothèque de Genève collection

Edouard Sarasin (20 May 1843 – 22 July 1917) was an independent scientist in Geneva. Born in a wealthy family, he established a private laboratory where he collaborated with other researchers. His studies included those on the properties of waves, resonance, radiowaves, radiation and geophysics.

Sarasin came from a family of French descent who had settled in Geneva in the early sixteenth century. Sarasin studied physics at Paris, Heidelberg and Berlin and in 1867 he established a private laboratory on rue de l'Hôtel-de-Ville, and worked with other collaborators including Auguste de la Rive (1801-1873) and his son Lucien de la Rive. They made studies on ionization and discharge in vacuum tubes. Sarasin was later also mayor of the town of Le Grand-Saconnex (1871-1916), member of the parliament of Geneva (Grand Conseil genevois), President of the Societé Helvetique and editor of the Archives des Sciences physiques et naturelles. Sarasin's experimental work developed on the ideas of Maxwell and Hertz on resonance and radiowave reception. He also conducted work on radiowaves and radio-activity, some of the work being done along with Thomas Tommasina. Sarasin was also interested in geophysics and conducted studies at Lake Leman on light penetration through water. He also studied circular polarization in quartz with Jacques-Louis Soret from 1875. After Soret's death, Sarasin became director of the Archive of Geneva. He received an honorary doctorate from the Universities of Basel in 1885 and Geneva in 1909.
