= William Marcet =

William Marcet FRS FRCP (13 May 1828 – 4 March 1900) was President of the Royal Meteorological Society

He was born the son of Francis Marcet, FRS and the grandson of Alexander Marcet, FRS in Geneva, Switzerland. He graduated M.D. as a physician from Edinburgh University in 1850 with the thesis "Fermentation".

He was appointed Assistant Physician at the Westminster Hospital in 1853. He was then Lecturer on Chemistry and Forensic Medicine at the Westminster Hospital Medical School and Assistant Physician at Brompton Hospital from 1867. He carried out a number of field experiments in the Alps and the island of Tenerife on the effect of altitude on respiration and delivered the Croonian Lecture to the Royal College of Physicians in 1895 on the subject.

He was elected a Fellow of the Royal Society in 1857. He was President of the Royal Meteorological Society from 1888 to 1889.

He died in London.
