= Lucien de la Rive =

Swiss physicist

- Born: 3 April 1834; Choulex, Switzerland
- Died: 4 May 1924 (aged 90); Geneva, Switzerland
- Occupation: Physicist
- Spouse: Louise Scherer

Lucien de la Rive (3 April 1834 – 4 May 1924) was a Swiss physicist. He studied electromagnetism and wrote an early article on the Theory of relativity. He was also interested in literature, and published a translation of works of Tennyson.

== Life ==
De la Rive was born in Choulex, Switzerland, son of the physicist Auguste Arthur de la Rive. He studied at the Academy of Geneva and at the École Polytechnique in Paris. In 1863, he published an article Sur le nombre d'équations indépendantes dans la solution d'un système de courants linéaires ("On the number of independent equations in the solution of a system of linear currents", relating to Kirchhoff's circuit laws), and between then and 1918 published many scientific studies on gravitation, the theory of electrons and Maxwell's equations. From 1889 to 1893, he researched the propagation of electromagnetic waves with Edouard Sarasin. In 1914, he published L'aberration de la lumière et les équations de la théorie de la relativité ("The aberration of light and the equations of the theory of relativity") and an essay on Henri Poincaré. In 1909, he was appointed Doctor honoris causa of the University of Geneva.

Also interested in literature, he wrote translations of works of Alfred, Lord Tennyson (1870) and an essay on John Milton (1886).

He married Louise Scherer in 1867.
