= Auguste Arthur De la Rive =

Swiss physicist

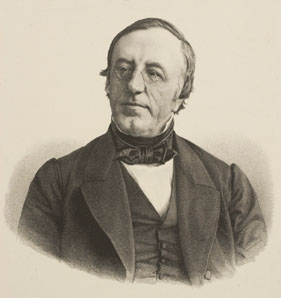
- Born: 9 October 1801; Geneva, Léman department, France
- Died: 27 November 1873 (aged 72); Marseille, France

Prof Auguste Arthur De la Rive ForMemRS, HFRSE (9 October 1801 – 27 November 1873) was a Swiss physicist. He was President of the Helvetic Society of Natural Science in 1845.

De la Rive's first scientific publication was on the influence of the Earth's magnetism upon a movable frame traversed by a voltaic current, published in 1822, and followed by a memoir upon Caustics, which appeared in 1823. Over a period of fifty years, De la Rive made numerous contributions to science, which were published in the Mémoires de la Société de Physique et d'Histoire Naturelle de Genève or in the Bibliothèque universelle de Genève.

== Life ==
De la Rive was born in Geneva, the son of Charles-Gaspard de la Rive (1770–1834). His father had studied medicine at Edinburgh University, and after practising for a few years in London, became professor of pharmaceutical chemistry at the academy of Geneva in 1802. He served as its rector between 1823 and 1825. At the age of twenty-two, Auguste was appointed to the chair of natural philosophy in the same academy. For some years after his appointment he devoted himself specially, with François Marcet (1803–1883), to the investigation of the specific heat of gases, and to observations for determining the temperature of the Earth's crust.

Electrical studies, however, engaged most of his attention, especially in connexion with the theory of the voltaic cell and the electric discharge in rarefied gases. De la Rive began his scientific labors soon after the new era was opened in the history of electricity and magnetism by the discovery of electro-magnetism, and by Ampere's electro-dynamical theory. His father had a share in this discovery, and his house was visited by others eminent in the same line of research. This may account for the preference which the son early manifested for the study of electricity, and which he continued to cultivate in its manifold relations to the end of his scientific career. Indeed, there are very few among his many printed papers which are upon other subjects.

His researches on the subject of electric discharge in rarefied gases led him to form a new theory of the aurora borealis. In 1840 he described a process for the electro-gilding of silver and brass, for which in the following year he received a prize of 3000 francs from the French Academy of Sciences. This and other papers were deemed of sufficient value to be republished in the Annales de Chimie et de Physique or in the Comptes Rendus. The principal work of De la Rive was his Treatise on Electricity in Theory and Practice in three volumes published simultaneously in French and English. which appeared in the years 1854–58. De la Rive described his theory of the cause of the Aurora Borealis, first published as a memoir in 1854, and illustrated by the experiment, now familiar to physicists, of rotating the voltaic arc of light around the pole of a magnet as any other ponderable conductor would rotate. The Treatise on Electricity was considered "accurate and comprehensive, and is indispensable for the scientific student of electricity".

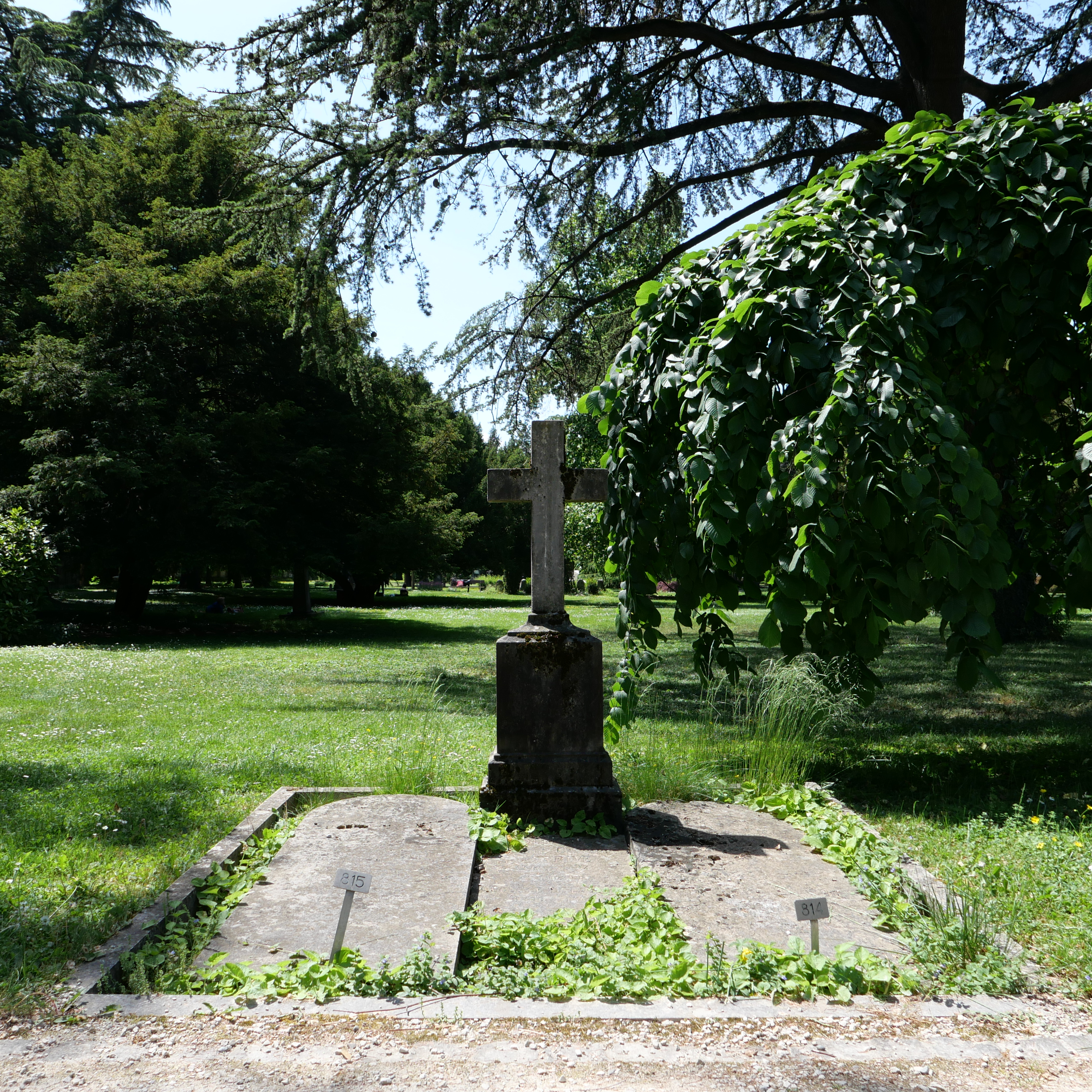
De la Rive's grave at the Cimetière des Rois in Geneva

De la Rive's birth and fortune gave him considerable social and political influence. He was known for his hospitality to literary and scientific men, and for his interest in the welfare and independence of his native country. In 1860, when the annexation of Savoy and Nice had led the Genevese to fear French aggression, De la Rive was sent by his fellow-citizens on a special embassy to England, and succeeded in securing a declaration from the English government, which was communicated privately to that of France, that any attack on Geneva would be regarded as a casus belli. On the occasion of this visit the university of Oxford conferred upon De la Rive the honorary degree of Doctor of Civil Law.

In the spring of 1873, the health of De la Rive began to fail, and he showed symptoms of paralysis. Nevertheless, he was able to prepare and read himself, though in a feeble voice, on 5 June, his annual report to the Society de Physique et d'Histoire Naturelle, the presidency of which he had resigned. Early in November he started for Cannes, where he had taken a house for the winter, with his family.

He planned to spend the winter of 1873/74 in Cannes. On the second day of his journey (November 6), between Montelimart and Avignon, he was struck with paralysis. He reached Marseille, where he died on 27 November 1873, at the age of seventy-two, this fatal termination of his first indications of declining health having been precipitated by repeated domestic bereavements. In the world of science, and by the various scientific Academies of which he was an Honorary Member, his loss was deplored.

== Works ==
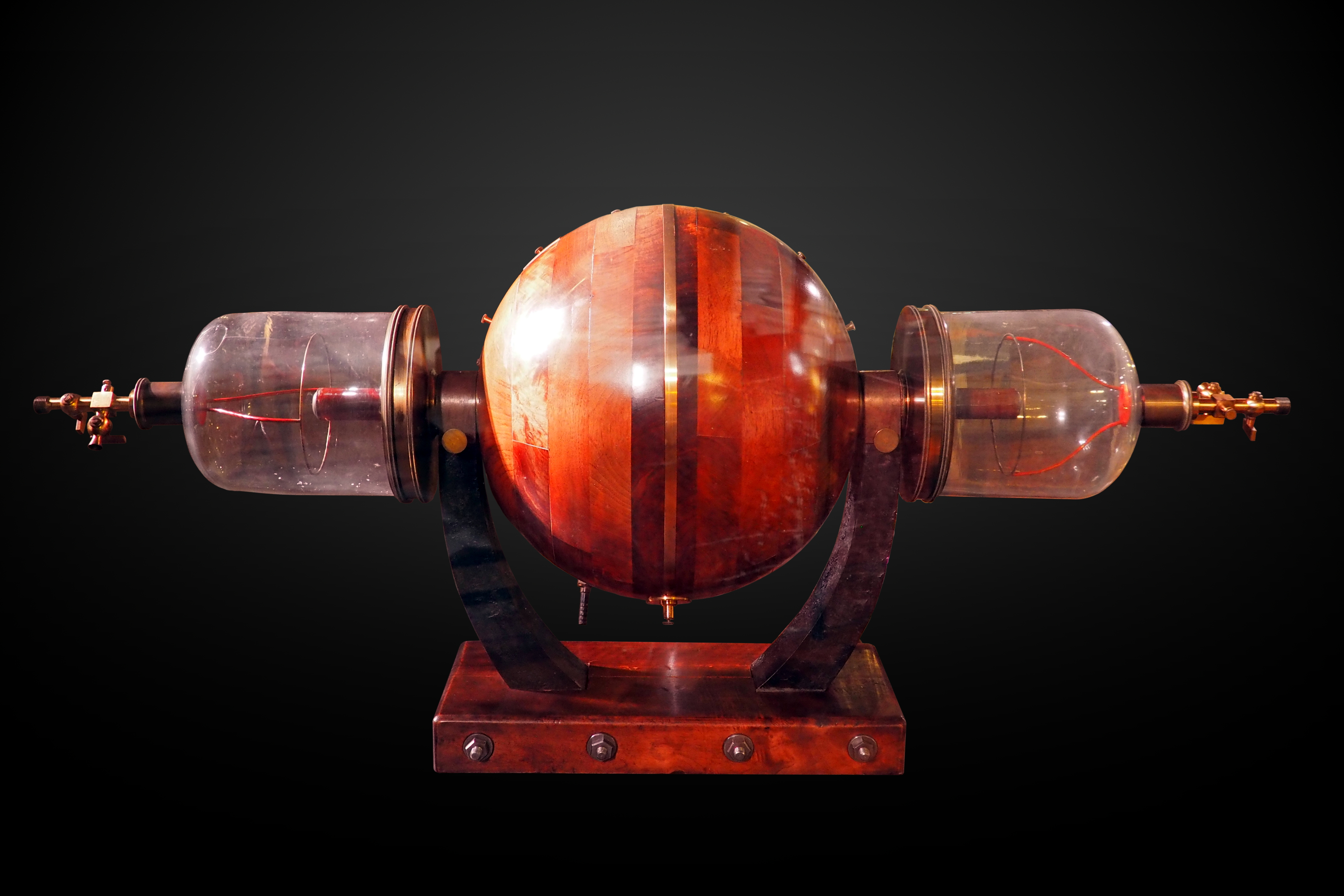
Aurora-simulating machine designed by de la Rive, on display at the Musée d'histoire des sciences de la Ville de Genève.

Between 1854 and 1858 he published a Traité de l'Électricité théorique et appliquée, which was translated into several languages.

From 1836 to 1845 he edited the literary and scientific parts of the Bibliothèque universelle de Genève which were then united. He compiled alone, as supplementary to it, the "Archives de l'Electricité," in five volumes (1841–45); and, with Marignac and others, the "Archives des Sciences Physiques et Naturelles," in thirty-six volumes (1846–57); and the "Nouvelle Periode " of the same Recueil, in nine volumes (1858–1860).

== Family ==
On August 18, 1826, he married writer Jeanne-Mathilde Duppa (March 14, 1808 – August 18, 1850). Their son, Lucien de la Rive, born in Choulex on 3 April 1834, published papers on various mathematical and physical subjects, and with Edouard Sarasin carried out investigations on the propagation of electric waves. In 1855, Auguste married the widow Louise Maurice, née Fatio.

== See also ==
- Plainpalais
