= Alexander Marcet =

Genevan and British physician (1770–1822)

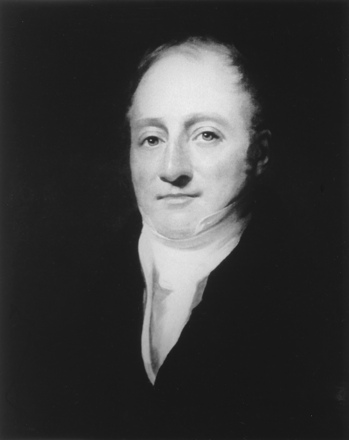
- Alexander Marcet, engraving by Henry Meyer after Sir Henry Raeburn.
- Born: 1 August 1770; Geneva, Republic of Geneva
- Died: 19 October 1822; Great Coram Street, London
- Occupations: medical doctor, chemist
- Known for: Fellow of the Royal Society

Alexander John Gaspard Marcet FRS (1 August 1770 – 19 October 1822), was a Genevan-born medical doctor who became a British citizen in 1800. His wife Jane Marcet was a prolific author, whose series of books entitled 'Conversations' treated topics such as chemistry, botany, religion and economics.

== Biography ==
Marcet was born at Geneva, and received his school education there. In 1794 he went to the University of Edinburgh, where he graduated with an MD on 24 June 1797. He wrote a thesis on diabetes, printed at Edinburgh in the same year. He then took a house in London, worked as assistant physician at Cary Street Dispensary, and was admitted a licentiate of the Royal College of Physicians on 25 June 1799. He then became a physician at Finsbury Dispensary, and at Guy's Hospital on 18 April 1804. He lectured there on chemistry between 1805 and 1819.

Marcet took charge of the temporary military hospital at Portsmouth in 1809 for some months, when it contained invalids from Walcheren. He had married Jane Haldimand (see Jane Marcet), lived in Russell Square, and, as he grew wealthier, grew less and less inclined for medical practice.

He retired from the staff of Guy's Hospital, 10 March 1819, and went to live in Geneva, where he was appointed honorary professor of chemistry. He visited England in 1821, and died in Great Coram Street, London, 19 October 1822. His grandson was William Marcet, FRS.

== Works ==
In 1805, Marcet contributed an essay, A Chemical Account of the Brighton Chalybeate, to a new edition of the Treatise on Mineral Waters of his colleague, William Saunders. This was also published in the same year as a pamphlet. He describes a variety of experiments of the rudimentary chemistry of that period made with the water of a chalybeate spring called the Wick, and shows that, unlike the Tonbridge spa, it might be drunk warm without any precipitation of iron.

He was elected Fellow of the Royal Society in 1815, and published some chemical papers in the Philosophical Transactions. He published in 1817 An Essay on the Chemical History and Medical Treatment of Calculous Disorders. He complains that he was unable to give full statistics, as no major London hospital then kept any regular record of cases. He was probably the first to remark that the pain of a renal calculus is often due to its passage down a ureter, and that it may grow in the kidney without the patient suffering acutely at all. For Rees's Cyclopædia he contributed articles on chemistry, but the topics are not known.
