= Emmanuel-Étienne Duvillard =

Swiss economist

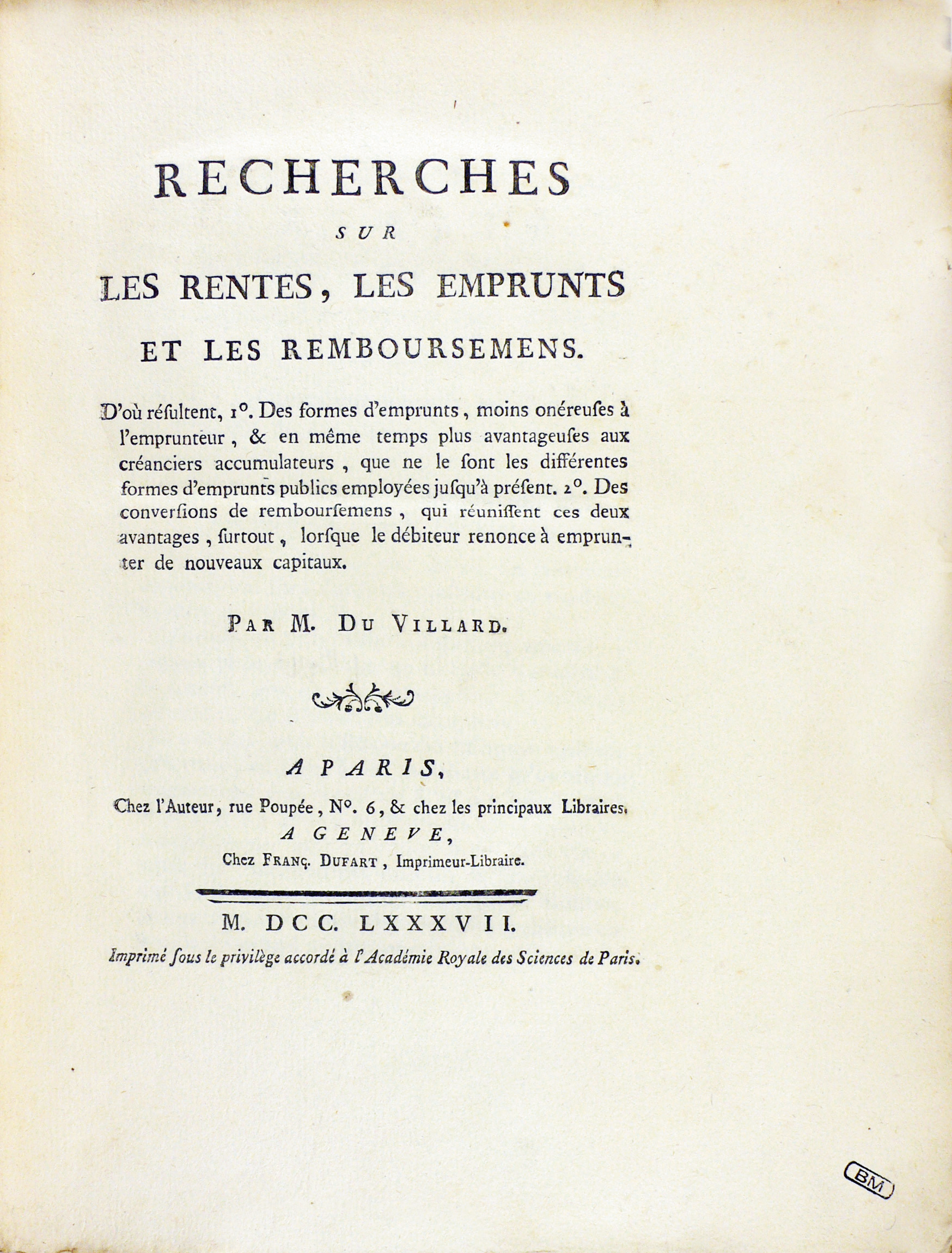
Recherches sur les rentes, 1787.

Emmanuel-Étienne Duvillard (1775–1832) was a Swiss economist.

== Selected works ==
- Duvillard, Emmanuel-Etienne (1806). Analyse et tableaux de l'influence de la petite vérole sur la mortalité à chaque age, et de celle qu'un préservatif tel que la vaccine peut avoir sur la population et la longévité (in French). Paris: L'imprimerie impériale.
