= Canton of Collonges =

Coordinates: 46°08′21″N 5°54′18″E

Collonges
- Former canton
- Interactive map of Collonges
- Country: France
- Region: Auvergne-Rhône-Alpes
- Department: Ain
- No. of communes: {{{nbcomm}}}
- Disbanded: 2015
- Area: 164.63 km^{2} (63.56 sq mi)
- Population (2012): 11,647
  - Density: 70.747/km^{2} (183.23/sq mi)

The canton of Collonges is a former administrative division in eastern France. It was disbanded following the French canton reorganisation which came into effect in March 2015. It had 11,647 inhabitants (2012).

The canton comprised 10 communes:

- Challex
- Chézery-Forens
- Collonges
- Confort
- Farges
- Lancrans
- Léaz
- Péron
- Pougny
- Saint-Jean-de-Gonville

== Demographics ==
Historical population Canton of Collonges
Year	1962	1968	1975	1982	1990	1999
Pop.	5,124	5,639	6,365	6,580	7,411	8,431
±%	—	+10.1%	+12.9%	+3.4%	+12.6%	+13.8%
From the year 1962 on: No double counting – residents of multiple communes (e.g. students and military personnel) are counted only once. Source: INSEE

== See also ==
- Cantons of the Ain department
- Communes of France
