= Ségny =

Commune in Auvergne-Rhône-Alpes, France

- Commune
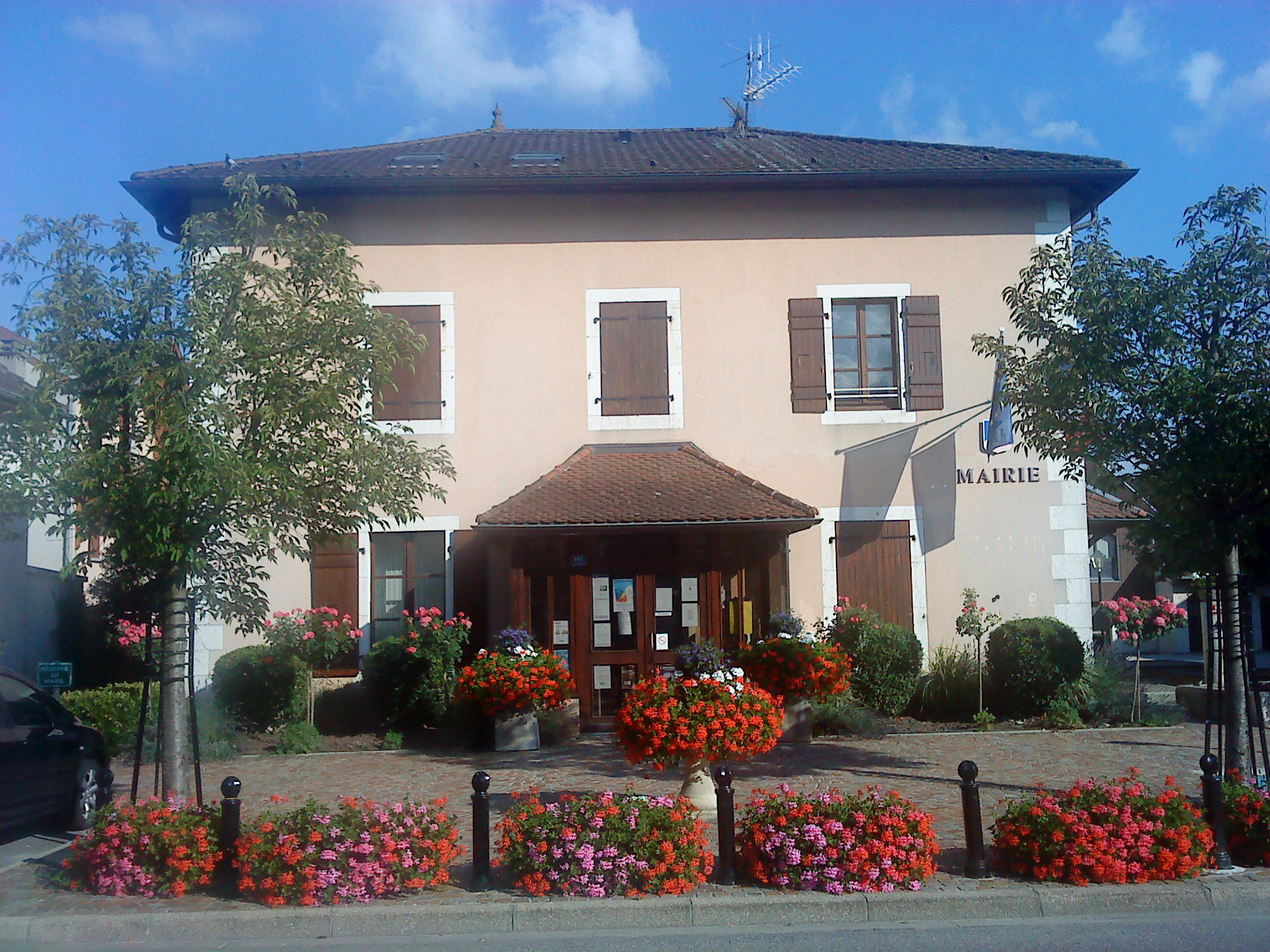
- Town hall

- Coat of arms
- Location of Ségny
- Location within France Location within Auvergne-Rhône-Alpes
- Coordinates: 46°17′49″N 6°04′25″E
- Country: France
- Region: Auvergne-Rhône-Alpes
- Department: Ain
- Arrondissement: Gex
- Canton: Thoiry
- Intercommunality: CA Pays de Gex

Government
  - Mayor (2026–32): Annick Grosroyat
- Area^{1}: 3.24 km^{2} (1.25 sq mi)
- Elevation: 479 m (1,572 ft)
- Highest elevation: 519 m (1,703 ft)
- Lowest elevation: 467 m (1,532 ft)
- Population (2023): 2,941
  - Density: 908/km^{2} (2,350/sq mi)
- Time zone: UTC+01:00 (CET)
  - Summer (DST): UTC+02:00 (CEST)
- INSEE/Postal code: 01399 /01170
- ^{1} French Land Register data, which excludes lakes, ponds, glaciers > 1 km^{2} (0.386 sq mi or 247 acres) and river estuaries.

Ségny (French pronunciation: [seɲi]), also written Segny, is a commune in the Ain department in eastern France.

Ségny is situated in the east of the department, in a district of the Lake Geneva / River Rhône basin known as the Pays de Gex. It lies on the important RN 5 trunk road from Paris to Geneva and is just five minutes by road from Geneva Cointrin International Airport. A local bus service connects Ségny to Geneva city centre, which is some 13 km (8.1 mi) away.

Ségny became a member of the Pays de Gex Community of Communes on 1 January 1996. The commune is bordered by Cessy to the north, Versonnex to the east, Prévessin-Moëns and Ornex to the south, and Échenevex and Chevry to the west.

== Population ==
Historical population

Year	Pop.	±% p.a.
1793	221	—
1800	432	+10.05%
1806	261	−8.06%
1821	253	−0.21%
1831	311	+2.09%
1836	328	+1.07%
1841	316	−0.74%
1846	280	−2.39%
1851	282	+0.14%
1856	270	−0.87%
1861	264	−0.45%
1866	284	+1.47%
1872	292	+0.46%
1876	300	+0.68%
1881	289	−0.74%
1886	275	−0.99%
1891	253	−1.65%
1896	235	−1.47%
1901	257	+1.81%

Year	Pop.	±% p.a.
1906	237	−1.61%
1911	249	+0.99%
1921	250	+0.04%
1926	239	−0.90%
1931	216	−2.00%
1936	217	+0.09%
1946	201	−0.76%
1954	223	+1.31%
1962	279	+2.84%
1968	449	+8.25%
1975	783	+8.27%
1982	1,002	+3.59%
1990	1,211	+2.40%
1999	1,348	+1.20%
2007	1,536	+1.65%
2012	1,762	+2.78%
2017	2,062	+3.19%
2023	2,941	+6.10%

Source: EHESS and INSEE (1968-2023)

== See also ==
- Communes of the Ain department
