= Canton of Ferney-Voltaire =

Coordinates: 46°15′21″N 6°06′29″E

Ferney-Voltaire
- Former canton
- Interactive map of Ferney-Voltaire
- Country: France
- Region: Auvergne-Rhône-Alpes
- Department: Ain
- No. of communes: {{{nbcomm}}}
- Disbanded: 2015
- Area: 78.43 km^{2} (30.28 sq mi)
- Population (2012): 40,677
  - Density: 518.6/km^{2} (1,343/sq mi)

The canton of Ferney-Voltaire is a former administrative division in eastern France. It was disbanded following the French canton reorganisation which came into effect in March 2015. It had 40,677 inhabitants (2012).

The canton comprised 8 communes:

- Ferney-Voltaire
- Ornex
- Prévessin-Moëns
- Saint-Genis-Pouilly
- Sauverny
- Sergy
- Thoiry
- Versonnex

== Demographics ==
Historical population Canton of Ferney-Voltaire
Year	1962	1968	1975	1982	1990	1999
Pop.	5,355	8,342	15,304	19,066	25,239	28,427
±%	—	+55.8%	+83.5%	+24.6%	+32.4%	+12.6%
From the year 1962 on: No double counting – residents of multiple communes (e.g. students and military personnel) are counted only once. Source: INSEE

== See also ==
- Cantons of the Ain department
- Communes of France
