= Arrondissement of Gex =

Coordinates: 46°19′N 6°04′E

Gex
- Arrondissement
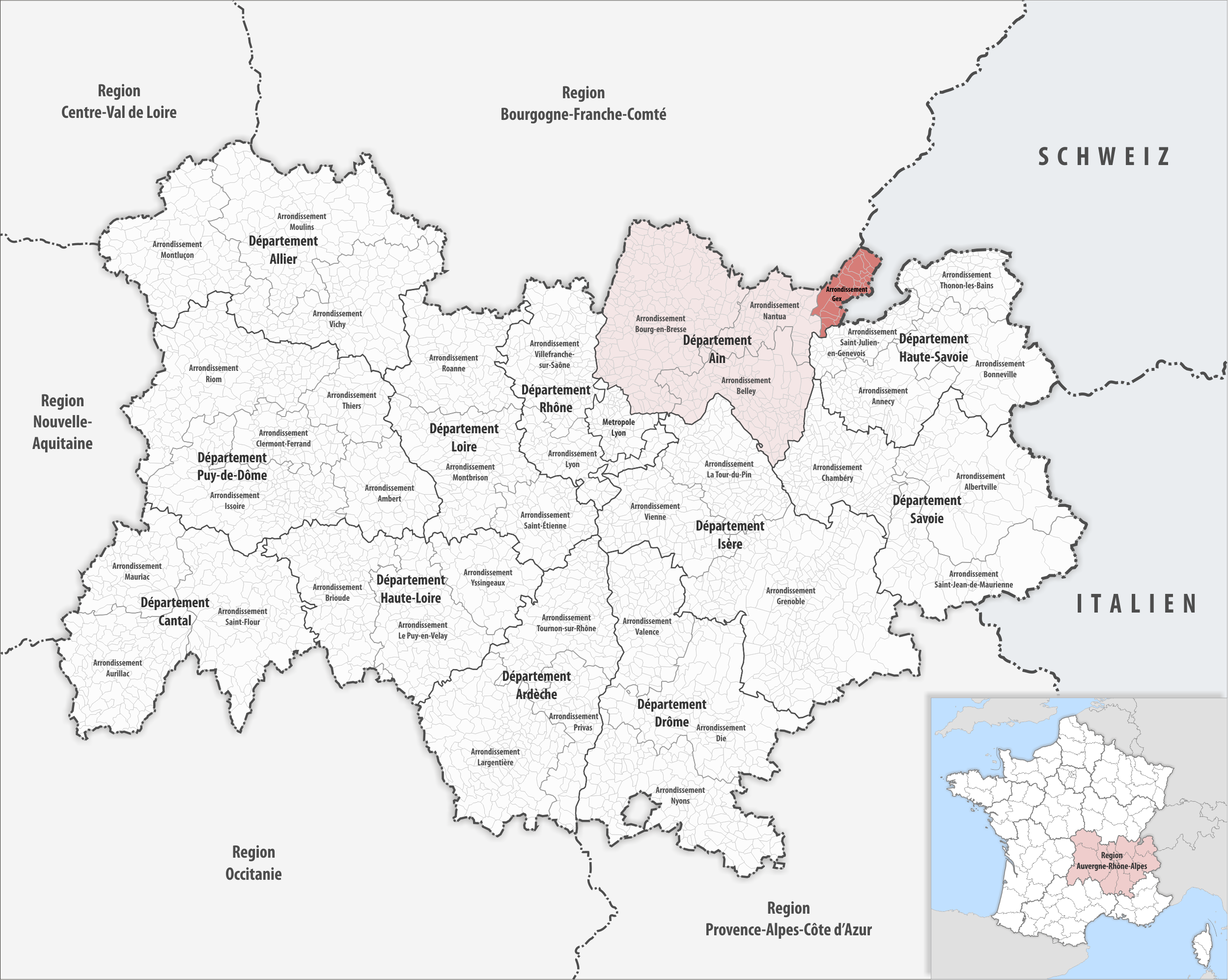
- Location within the region Auvergne-Rhône-Alpes
- Country: France
- Region: Auvergne-Rhône-Alpes
- Department: Ain
- No. of communes: {{{nbcomm}}}
- Area: 404.9 km^{2} (156.3 sq mi)
- Population (2023): 107,091
  - Density: 264.5/km^{2} (685.0/sq mi)
- INSEE code: 013

The arrondissement of Gex is an arrondissement of France in the Ain department in the Auvergne-Rhône-Alpes region. It approximately corresponds to the historical region of the Pays de Gex. It has 27 communes. Its population is 102,027 (2021), and its area is 404.9 km^{2} (156.3 sq mi).

== Composition ==
The communes of the arrondissement of Gex, and their INSEE codes, are:

1. Cessy (01071)
2. Challex (01078)
3. Chevry (01103)
4. Chézery-Forens (01104)
5. Collonges (01109)
6. Crozet (01135)
7. Divonne-les-Bains (01143)
8. Échenevex (01153)
9. Farges (01158)
10. Ferney-Voltaire (01160)
11. Gex (01173)
12. Grilly (01180)
13. Léaz (01209)
14. Lélex (01210)
15. Mijoux (01247)
16. Ornex (01281)
17. Péron (01288)
18. Pougny (01308)
19. Prévessin-Moëns (01313)
20. Saint-Genis-Pouilly (01354)
21. Saint-Jean-de-Gonville (01360)
22. Sauverny (01397)
23. Ségny (01399)
24. Sergy (01401)
25. Thoiry (01419)
26. Versonnex (01435)
27. Vesancy (01436)

== History ==
The arrondissement of Gex was created in 1800, disbanded in 1926 and restored in 1933. At the January 2017 reorganization of the arrondissements of Ain, it lost two communes to the arrondissement of Nantua.

As a result of the reorganisation of the cantons of France which came into effect in 2015, the borders of the cantons are no longer related to the borders of the arrondissements. The cantons of the arrondissement of Gex were, as of January 2015:

1. Collonges
2. Ferney-Voltaire
3. Gex

== Pays de Gex ==
The Pays de Gex (literally, land of Gex) was a part of the County of Geneva during the High Middle Ages. It is notable for the fact that it changed hands between Switzerland, the Duchy of Savoy and France several times. The final decision about its political affiliation was made by the Treaty of Paris (1815), which split it between France and Switzerland. The French part is now the Arrondissement of Gex, while the Swiss part is now the northwestern part of the Canton of Geneva.
