= Crozet, Ain =

Commune in Auvergne-Rhône-Alpes, France

Crozet
- Commune
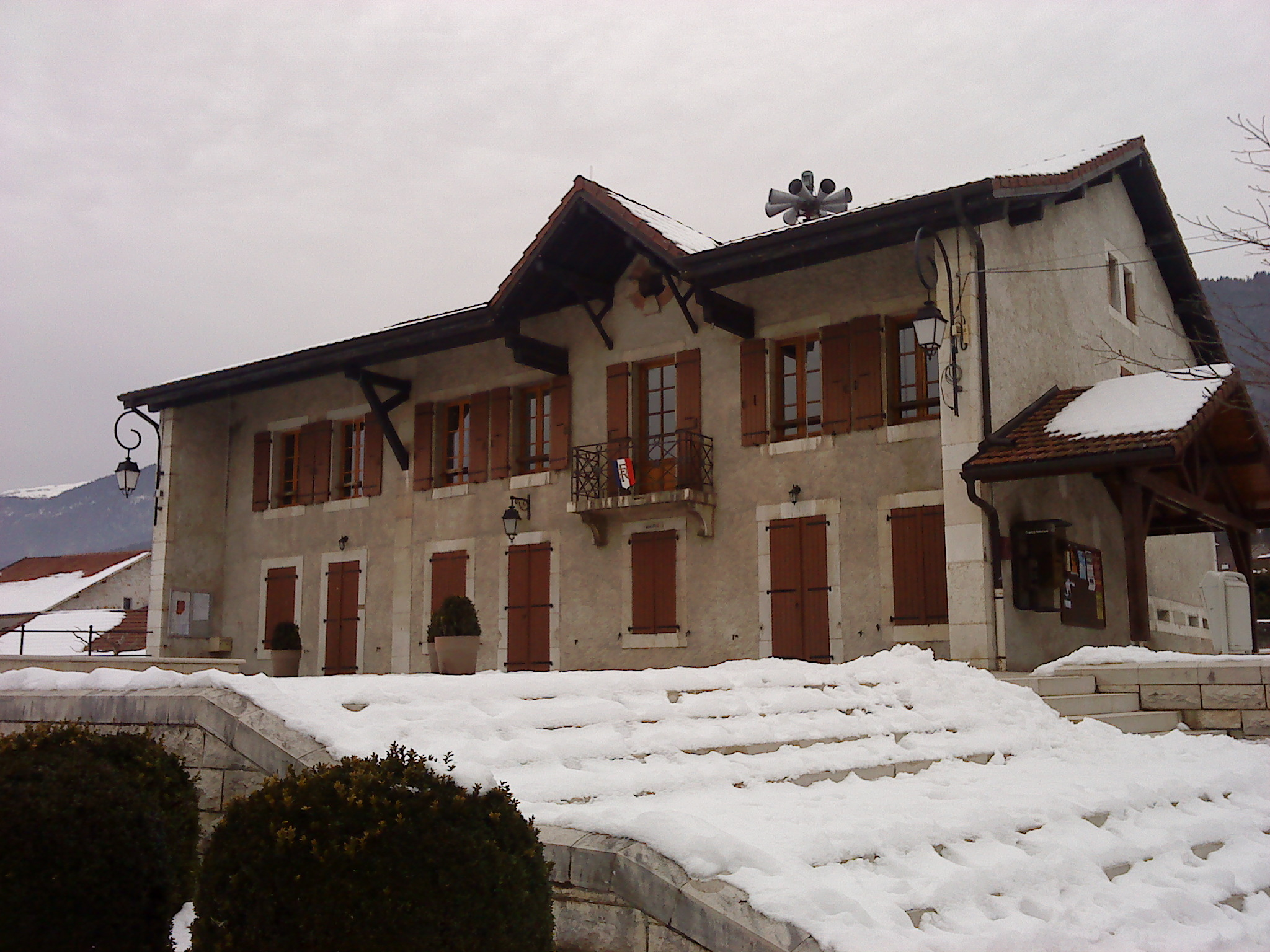
- Town hall

- Coat of arms
- Location of Crozet
- Location within France Location within Auvergne-Rhône-Alpes
- Coordinates: 46°16′50″N 6°00′45″E
- Country: France
- Region: Auvergne-Rhône-Alpes
- Department: Ain
- Arrondissement: Gex
- Canton: Thoiry
- Intercommunality: CA Pays de Gex

Government
  - Mayor (2026–32): Sophie Reboul Salze
- Area^{1}: 27.47 km^{2} (10.61 sq mi)
- Elevation: 541 m (1,775 ft)
- Highest elevation: 1,680 m (5,510 ft)
- Lowest elevation: 463 m (1,519 ft)
- Population (2023): 2,416
  - Density: 87.95/km^{2} (227.8/sq mi)
- Time zone: UTC+01:00 (CET)
  - Summer (DST): UTC+02:00 (CEST)
- INSEE/Postal code: 01135 /01170
- ^{1} French Land Register data, which excludes lakes, ponds, glaciers > 1 km^{2} (0.386 sq mi or 247 acres) and river estuaries.

Crozet (French pronunciation: [kʁozɛ]) is a commune in the Ain department in eastern France.

Crozet is nestled at the foot of the Jura Mountains in eastern France some 15 kilometres (9 mi) from the centre of the Swiss city of Geneva and approximately 150 kilometres (93 mi) from the French city of Lyon. It is also near Geneva International Airport, at a distance of some 10 kilometres (6 mi).

Its chief attraction is a cable car which carries hikers to the top of the Jura Mountains during the summer and serves a small ski resort during the winter. It has several sporting clubs: the St-Genis-Ferney-Crozet sporting association (soccer), a tennis club, and a ski club. Other places of interest include the remains of the château de Rossillon, a church (reconstructed around 1830), the Crozet forest, and the Monts-Jura ski area, which runs between Crozet and the town of Lélex in the adjacent valley.

== Religious history ==
Saint Peter Chanel, later to die as a missionary in the Pacific and be declared a martyr and eventually canonised, was parish priest of Crozet between 1827 and 1830, and Church histories credit him with having at a short time revitalized this then run down parish.

== Population ==
Historical population
Year	Pop.	±% p.a.
1968	440	—
1975	711	+7.10%
1982	961	+4.40%
1990	1,164	+2.42%
1999	1,349	+1.65%
2007	1,720	+3.08%
2012	1,964	+2.69%
2017	2,138	+1.71%
2023	2,416	+2.06%
Source: INSEE

== See also ==
- Communes of the Ain department
