= Ornex =

Commune in Auvergne-Rhône-Alpes, France

Ornex Ornèx (Arpitan)
- Commune
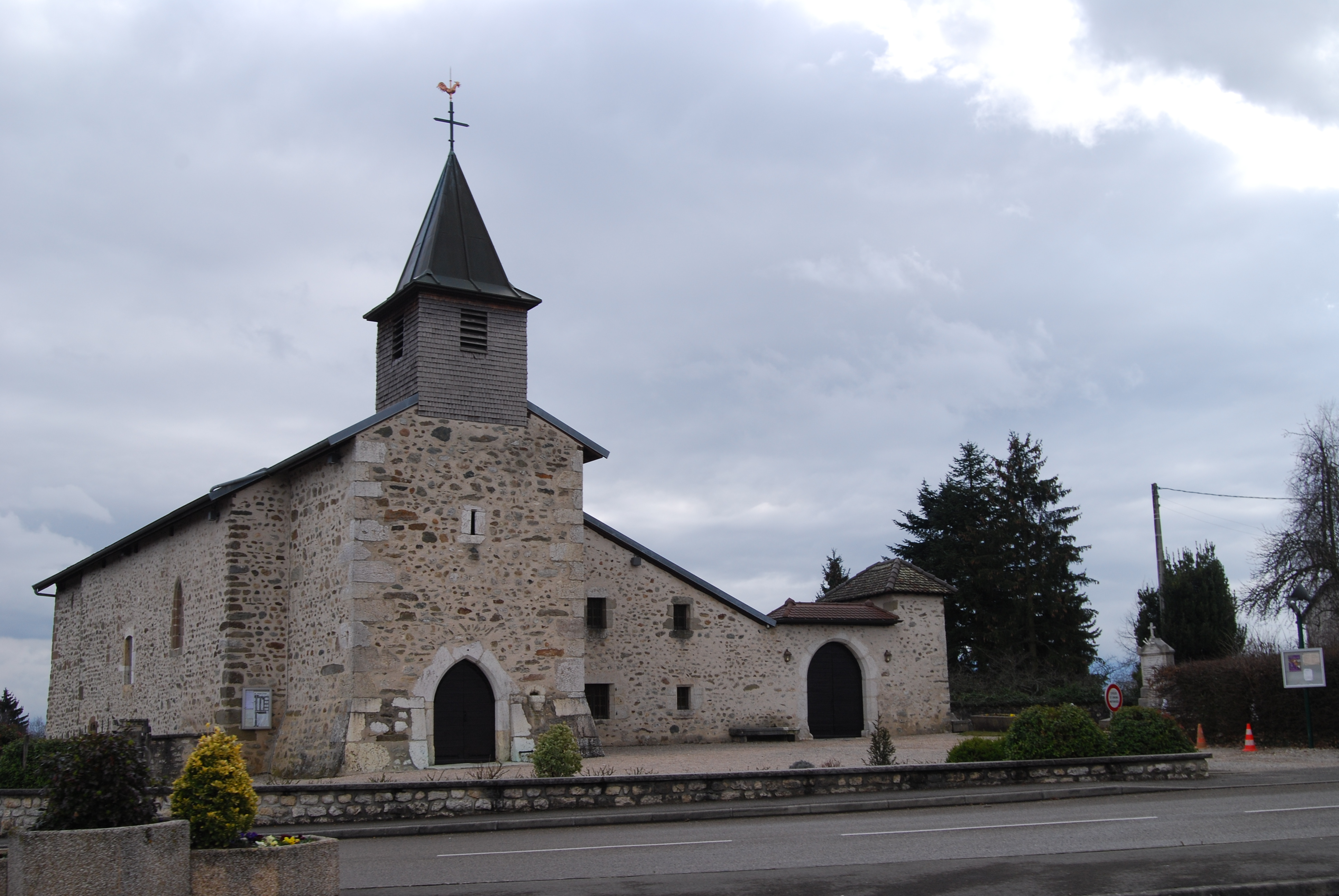

- Coat of arms
- Location of Ornex
- Location within France Location within Auvergne-Rhône-Alpes
- Coordinates: 46°15′36″N 6°05′53″E
- Country: France
- Region: Auvergne-Rhône-Alpes
- Department: Ain
- Arrondissement: Gex
- Canton: Saint-Genis-Pouilly
- Intercommunality: CA Pays de Gex

Government
  - Mayor (2026–32): Olivier Guichard
- Area^{1}: 5.64 km^{2} (2.18 sq mi)
- Highest elevation: 481 m (1,578 ft)
- Lowest elevation: 438 m (1,437 ft)
- Population (2023): 5,082
  - Density: 901/km^{2} (2,330/sq mi)
- Time zone: UTC+01:00 (CET)
  - Summer (DST): UTC+02:00 (CEST)
- INSEE/Postal code: 01281 /01210
- ^{1} French Land Register data, which excludes lakes, ponds, glaciers > 1 km^{2} (0.386 sq mi or 247 acres) and river estuaries.

Ornex (French pronunciation: [ɔʁnɛ]; Arpitan: Ornèx [ɔr.ˈne]) is a commune in the Ain department in eastern France.

== Geography ==
It is located on the former N5 highway between the Jura Mountains and the Swiss border.

Located nine kilometres from Geneva, many inhabitants commute across the Swiss border each morning to jobs with international organizations and multinational corporations. It is bordered in the south by Ferney-Voltaire, in the west by Prévessin-Moëns and Segny, in the north by Versonnex and in the east by the Swiss commune of Collex-Bossy.

A section of the 27 km (17 mi) tunnel excavated by CERN between 1983 and 1988 passes under the town. Originally excavated for the LEP collider, the tunnel now houses the Large Hadron Collider that started operating in 2008. The major visible presence of the LHC tunnel in the area are some surface buildings and some large helium gas tanks further North in Cessy. There are also a number of smaller tunnel Access Points, including one on the border of Ornex and Ferney-Voltaire. Liquid helium is used to cool the LHC's superconducting magnets.

== History ==
The first documented mention of Ornex was in 1153 under the name of Ornacho; from 1286 onwards the name of Ornay is mentioned. It is assumed the name was derived from the Roman personal name Aurinius or Orinius and would thus mean the manor of Aurinius (Auriniacum).

While the village church belonged to the monastery of Payerne in the 13th century, the village itself belonged to local gentry, and became part of the fiefdom of the lords of Gex in the 14th century. With this is followed the changeable history of the Pays de Gex in which it was finally ceded from the Dukes of Savoy to France in the Treaty of Lyon in 1601.

== Population ==
The census of 1999 revealed that 62.5% of working residents were employed outside of the Ain department. The population of Ornex is extremely diverse, representing many nationalities and several languages.

Historical population
| Year | Pop. | ±% p.a. |
|---|---|---|
| 1968 | 519 | — |
| 1975 | 1,042 | +10.47% |
| 1982 | 1,065 | +0.31% |
| 1990 | 2,263 | +9.88% |
| 1999 | 2,663 | +1.82% |
| 2007 | 3,108 | +1.95% |
| 2012 | 4,027 | +5.32% |
| 2017 | 4,410 | +1.83% |
| 2023 | 5,082 | +2.39% |
Source: INSEE

== See also ==
- Communes of the Ain department
