= Vesancy =

Commune in Auvergne-Rhône-Alpes, France

- Commune
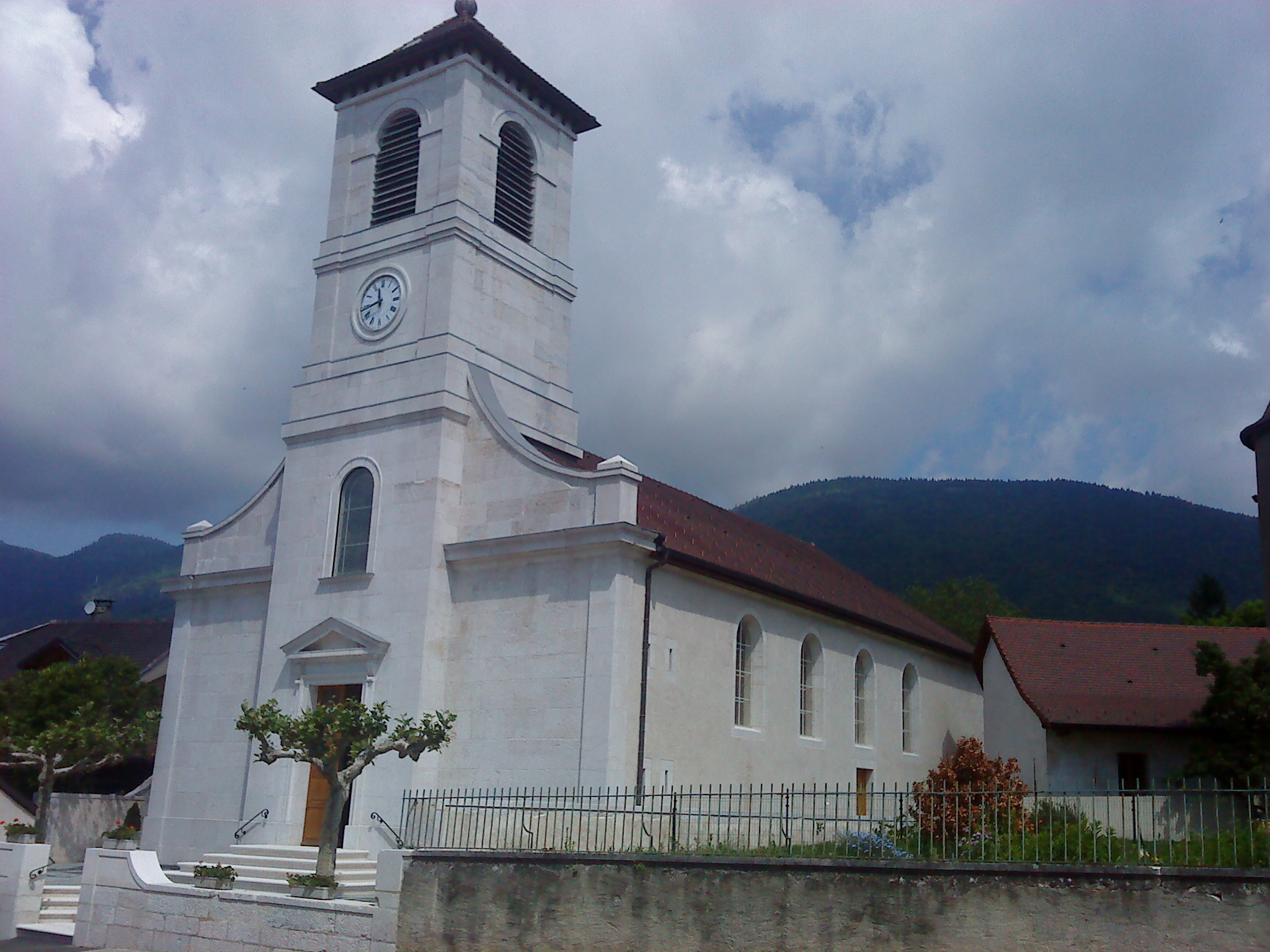
- Church of Saint Christopher

- Coat of arms
- Location of Vesancy
- Location within France Location within Auvergne-Rhône-Alpes
- Coordinates: 46°20′58″N 6°05′29″E
- Country: France
- Region: Auvergne-Rhône-Alpes
- Department: Ain
- Arrondissement: Gex
- Canton: Gex
- Intercommunality: CA Pays de Gex

Government
  - Mayor (2026–32): Arnaud Maillard
- Area^{1}: 10.7 km^{2} (4.1 sq mi)
- Elevation: 630 m (2,070 ft)
- Highest elevation: 1,490 m (4,890 ft)
- Lowest elevation: 582 m (1,909 ft)
- Population (2023): 520
  - Density: 49/km^{2} (130/sq mi)
- Time zone: UTC+01:00 (CET)
  - Summer (DST): UTC+02:00 (CEST)
- INSEE/Postal code: 01436 /01170
- ^{1} French Land Register data, which excludes lakes, ponds, glaciers > 1 km^{2} (0.386 sq mi or 247 acres) and river estuaries.

Vesancy (French pronunciation: [vəzɑ̃si]) is a commune in the Ain department in eastern France. The commune has an average elevation of 650 m (2,130 ft) above sea level.

== Population ==
Historical population
Year	Pop.	±% p.a.
1968	245	—
1975	290	+2.44%
1982	295	+0.24%
1990	363	+2.63%
1999	449	+2.39%
2007	511	+1.63%
2012	530	+0.73%
2017	484	−1.80%
2023	520	+1.20%
Source: INSEE

== See also ==
- Communes of the Ain department
