= Grilly =

Commune in Auvergne-Rhône-Alpes, France

- Commune
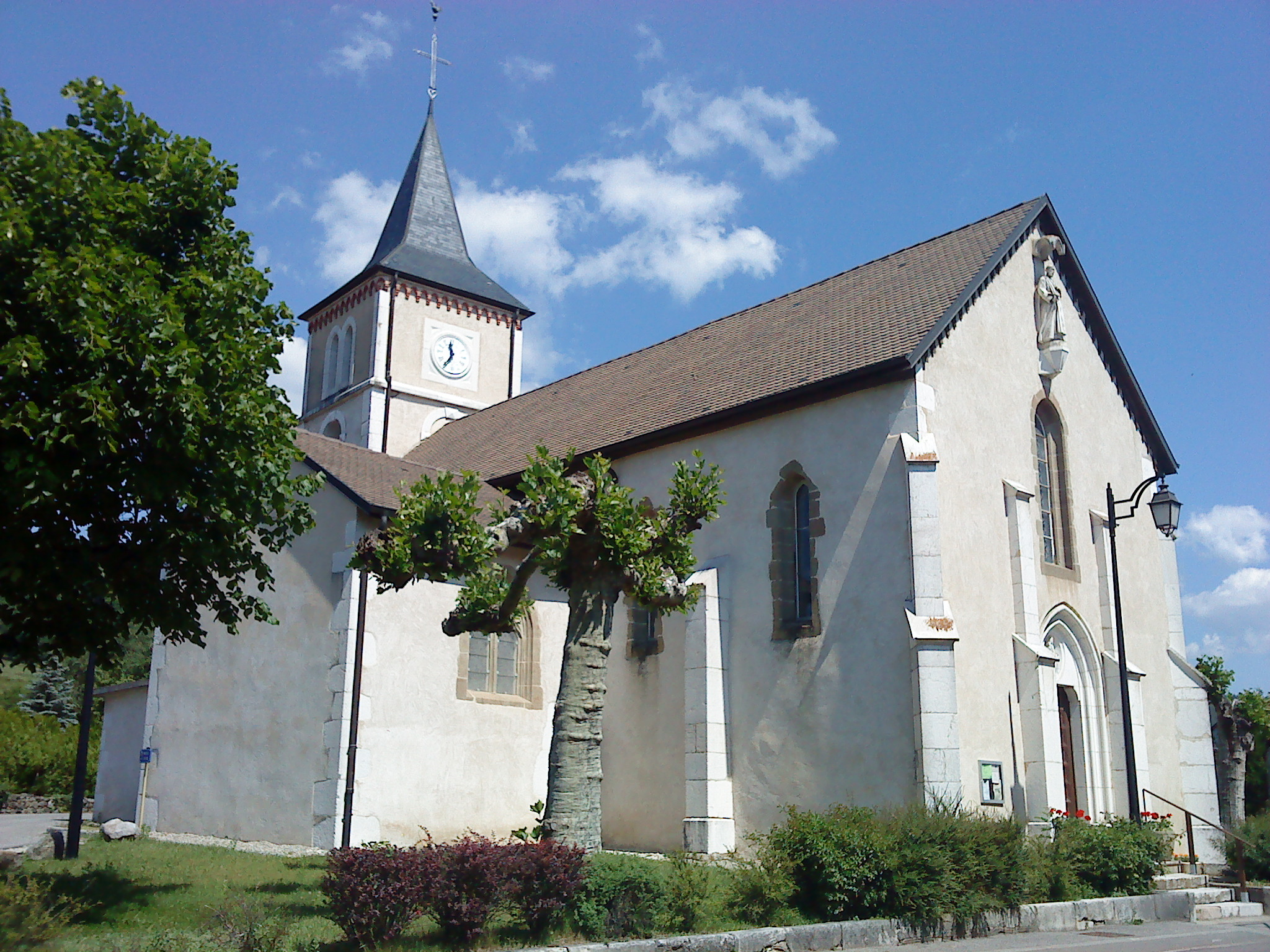
- Saint-Benoît church

- Coat of arms
- Location of Grilly
- Location within France Location within Auvergne-Rhône-Alpes
- Coordinates: 46°19′50″N 6°06′54″E
- Country: France
- Region: Auvergne-Rhône-Alpes
- Department: Ain
- Arrondissement: Gex
- Canton: Gex
- Intercommunality: CA Pays de Gex

Government
  - Mayor (2020–2026): Christine Dupenloup
- Area^{1}: 7.50 km^{2} (2.90 sq mi)
- Elevation: 474 m (1,555 ft)
- Highest elevation: 751 m (2,464 ft)
- Lowest elevation: 459 m (1,506 ft)
- Population (2023): 889
  - Density: 119/km^{2} (307/sq mi)
- Time zone: UTC+01:00 (CET)
  - Summer (DST): UTC+02:00 (CEST)
- INSEE/Postal code: 01180 /01220
- ^{1} French Land Register data, which excludes lakes, ponds, glaciers > 1 km^{2} (0.386 sq mi or 247 acres) and river estuaries.

Grilly (French pronunciation: [ɡʁiji]; Arpitan: Grelyi) is a commune in the Ain department in eastern France. As of 2020, it is the commune with the highest median per capita income (€55,100 per year) in France.

== Population ==
Historical population
Year	Pop.	±% p.a.
1968	302	—
1975	418	+4.75%
1982	520	+3.17%
1990	634	+2.51%
1999	612	−0.39%
2007	677	+1.27%
2012	779	+2.85%
2017	833	+1.35%
2023	889	+1.09%
Source: INSEE

== History ==
Jean I de Grailly was born at Grilly near Gex on the shores of Lac Léman in the County of Savoy. He probably travelled to England during the reign of Henry III of England in the entourage of Peter II of Savoy, In 1262 he was already a knight in the household of Prince Edward, the king's heir and future King Edward I of England. In 1263 he had attained the status of a counsellor of the young prince. He was made Edward's Seneschal in Gascony from 1278. In 1279, Jean travelled to Amiens and to England to negotiate the Treaty of Amiens, which ended the state of war between Edward of England and Philip III of France and returned the Agenais to English control. Jean de Grailly eventually fell short of funds for his activities, since his expenses need approval from the Exchequer before he could receive his salary. He took to exploitation and illegal exactions from the peasants, whose complaints eventually reached the ears of Edward I. He was removed from office sometime between June 1286 and Spring 1287. Led a French force alongside the English led by Otto de Grandson at the Fall of Acre in 1291.

== See also ==
- Communes of the Ain department
