= Canton of Thoiry =

Canton of France

Coordinates: 46.23°N 5.98°E

- Canton
- Situation of the canton of Thoiry in the department of Ain
- Country: France
- Region: Auvergne-Rhône-Alpes
- Department: Ain
- No. of communes: {{{nbcomm}}}
- Population (2023): 31,794
- INSEE code: 0120

The canton of Thoiry is an administrative division of the Ain department, in eastern France. It was created at the French canton reorganisation which came into effect in March 2015. Its seat is in Thoiry.

It consists of the following communes:

1. Challex
2. Chevry
3. Chézery-Forens
4. Collonges
5. Crozet
6. Échenevex
7. Farges
8. Léaz
9. Lélex
10. Mijoux
11. Péron
12. Pougny
13. Saint-Jean-de-Gonville
14. Ségny
15. Sergy
16. Thoiry
