= Communauté d'agglomération du Pays de Gex =

Coordinates: 46°20′N 06°05′E

Pays de Gex
- Communauté d'agglomération
- Country: France
- Region: Auvergne-Rhône-Alpes
- Department: Ain
- No. of communes: {{{nbcomm}}}
- Established: 1995

Government
  - President: Patrice Dunand (DVD)
- Area: 404.9 km^{2} (156.3 sq mi)
- Population (2019): 98,257
  - Density: 242.7/km^{2} (628.5/sq mi)
- Website: www.paysdegexagglo.fr

Communauté d'agglomération du Pays de Gex is the communauté d'agglomération, an intercommunal structure, centred on the town of Gex. It is located in the Ain department, in the Auvergne-Rhône-Alpes region, eastern France. Created in 1995, the administrative seat is located in its namesake commune of Gex. Its area is 404.9 km^{2}. Its population was 98,257 in 2019, of which 13,121 lived in Gex proper.

== Composition ==
The communauté d'agglomération consists of the following 27 communes:

1. Cessy
2. Challex
3. Chevry
4. Chézery-Forens
5. Collonges
6. Crozet
7. Divonne-les-Bains
8. Échenevex
9. Farges
10. Ferney-Voltaire
11. Gex
12. Grilly
13. Léaz
14. Lélex
15. Mijoux
16. Ornex
17. Péron
18. Pougny
19. Prévessin-Moëns
20. Saint-Genis-Pouilly
21. Saint-Jean-de-Gonville
22. Sauverny
23. Ségny
24. Sergy
25. Thoiry
26. Versonnex
27. Vesancy
