= Collonges, Ain =

Commune in Auvergne-Rhône-Alpes, France

Collonges Colonges (Arpitan)
- Commune
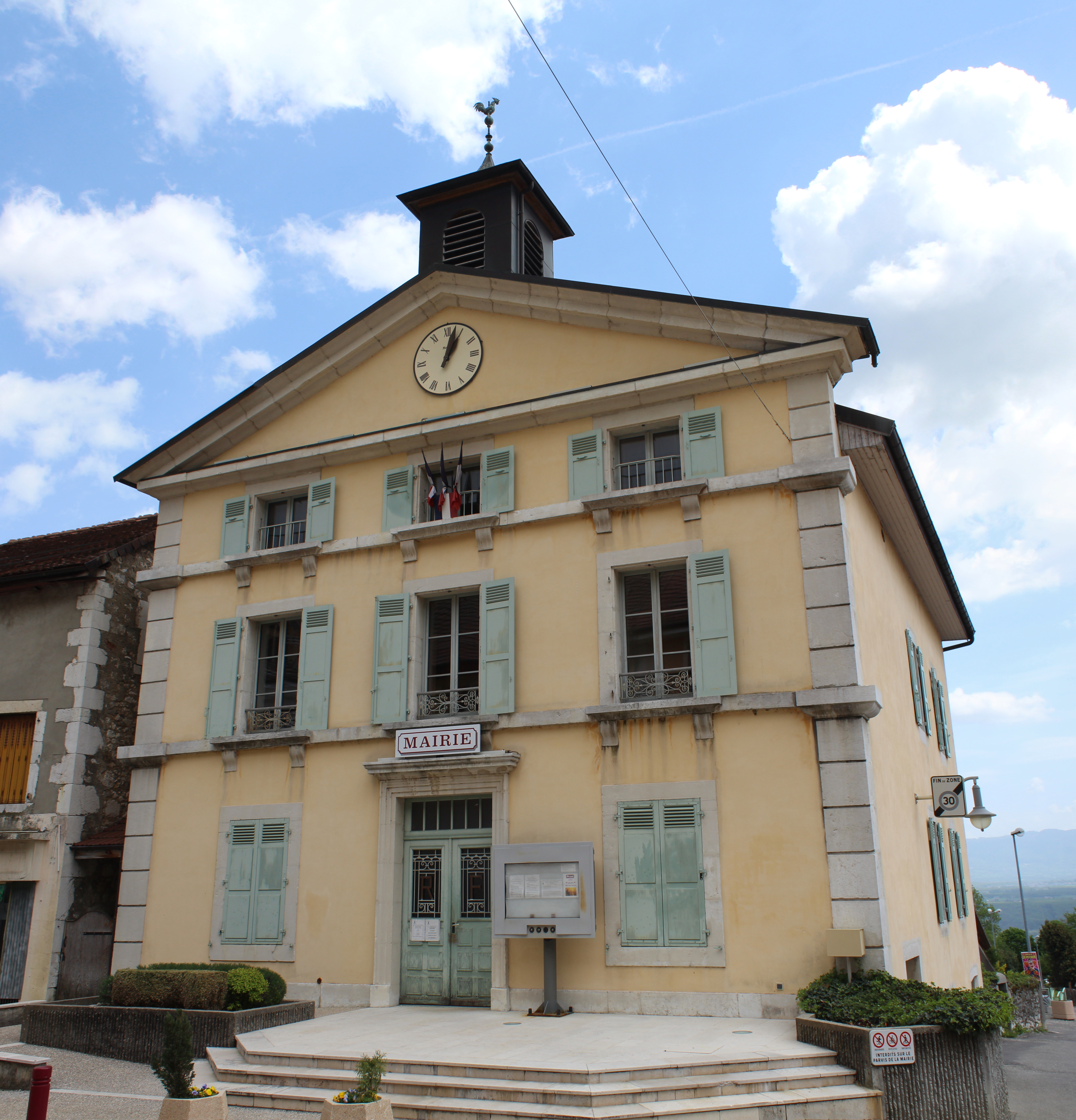
- Collonges Town Hall

- Coat of arms
- Location of Collonges
- Location within France Location within Auvergne-Rhône-Alpes
- Coordinates: 46°08′21″N 5°54′18″E
- Country: France
- Region: Auvergne-Rhône-Alpes
- Department: Ain
- Arrondissement: Gex
- Canton: Thoiry
- Intercommunality: CA Pays de Gex

Government
  - Mayor (2026–32): Lionel Perreal
- Area^{1}: 16.25 km^{2} (6.27 sq mi)
- Elevation: 500 m (1,600 ft)
- Highest elevation: 1,621 m (5,318 ft)
- Lowest elevation: 329 m (1,079 ft)
- Population (2023): 2,398
  - Density: 147.6/km^{2} (382.2/sq mi)
- Time zone: UTC+01:00 (CET)
  - Summer (DST): UTC+02:00 (CEST)
- INSEE/Postal code: 01109 /01550
- ^{1} French Land Register data, which excludes lakes, ponds, glaciers > 1 km^{2} (0.386 sq mi or 247 acres) and river estuaries.

Collonges (French pronunciation: [kɔlɔ̃ʒ]; Arpitan: Colonges) is a commune in the Ain department in the Auvergne-Rhône-Alpes region in Eastern France. Collonges is located on the border with the Haute-Savoie department, just northeast of Fort l'Écluse in Léaz, Ain. It is also situated 20 km (12.4 mi) southwest of Geneva, Switzerland.

== Demographics ==
Historical population
Year	Pop.	±% p.a.
1968	901	—
1975	966	+1.00%
1982	926	−0.60%
1990	1,000	+0.97%
1999	1,106	+1.13%
2007	1,421	+3.18%
2012	2,046	+7.56%
2017	2,219	+1.64%
2023	2,398	+1.30%
Source: INSEE

== See also ==
- Communes of the Ain department
