= Chézery-Forens =

Commune in Auvergne-Rhône-Alpes, France

- Commune
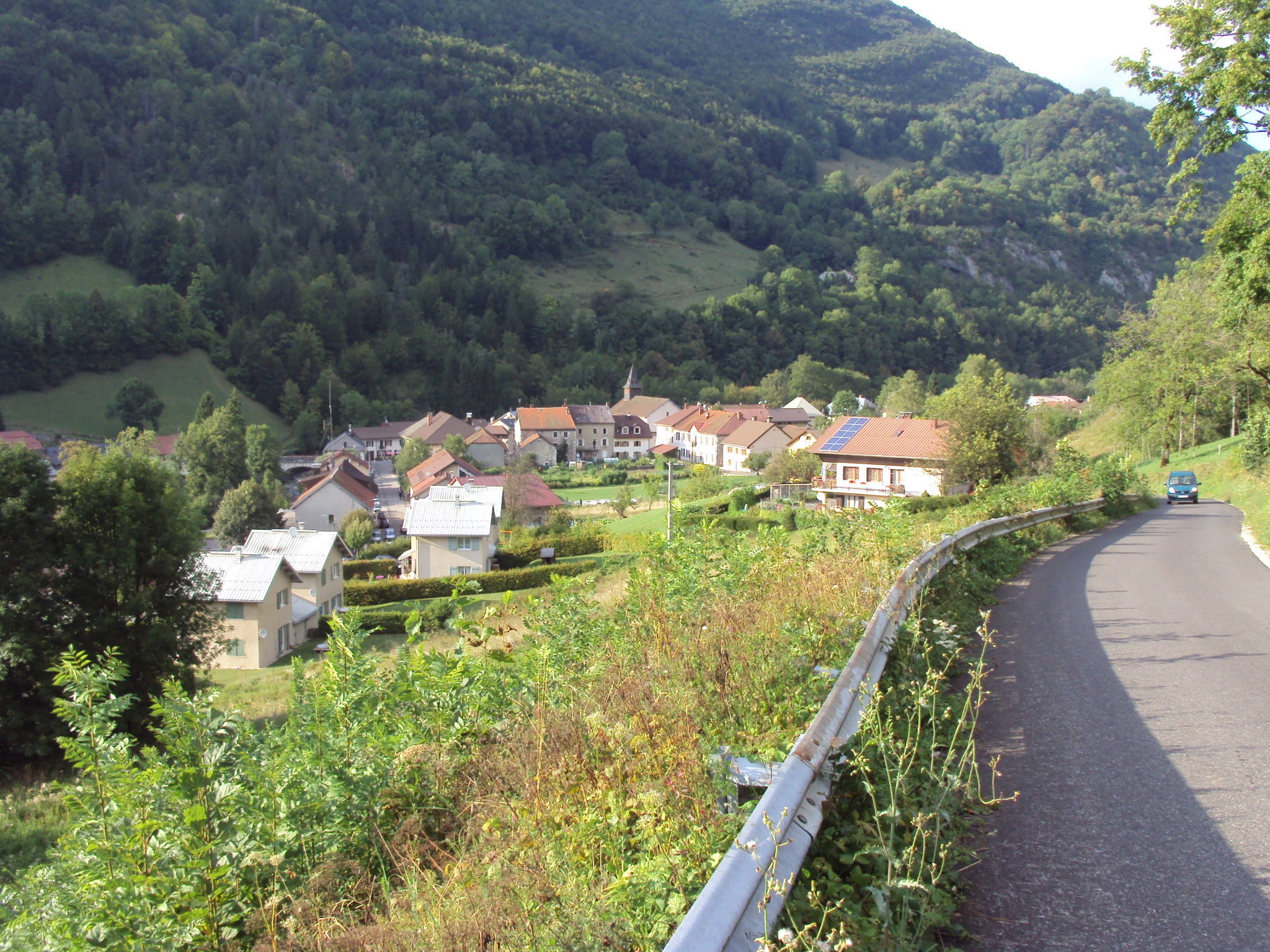
- Location of Chézery-Forens
- Location within France Location within Auvergne-Rhône-Alpes
- Coordinates: 46°13′18″N 5°51′59″E
- Country: France
- Region: Auvergne-Rhône-Alpes
- Department: Ain
- Arrondissement: Gex
- Canton: Thoiry
- Intercommunality: CA Pays de Gex

Government
  - Mayor (2026–32): Bernard Vuaillat
- Area^{1}: 46.57 km^{2} (17.98 sq mi)
- Elevation: 908 m (2,979 ft)
- Highest elevation: 1,692 m (5,551 ft)
- Lowest elevation: 435 m (1,427 ft)
- Population (2023): 433
  - Density: 9.30/km^{2} (24.1/sq mi)
- Time zone: UTC+01:00 (CET)
  - Summer (DST): UTC+02:00 (CEST)
- INSEE/Postal code: 01104 /01410, 01200
- ^{1} French Land Register data, which excludes lakes, ponds, glaciers > 1 km^{2} (0.386 sq mi or 247 acres) and river estuaries.

Chézery-Forens is a commune in the Ain department in eastern France.

The commune of Chézery-Forens was created in 1962 from the union of the villages of Chézery and Forens.

== Population ==
Historical population
Year	Pop.	±% p.a.
1968	436	—
1975	362	−2.62%
1982	337	−1.02%
1990	357	+0.72%
1999	369	+0.37%
2007	404	+1.14%
2012	451	+2.23%
2017	467	+0.70%
2023	433	−1.25%
Source: INSEE

== See also ==
- Communes of the Ain department
