= Canton of Gex =

Coordinates: 46°20′00″N 6°03′28″E

Gex
- Canton
- Interactive map of Gex
- Country: France
- Region: Auvergne-Rhône-Alpes
- Department: Ain
- No. of communes: {{{nbcomm}}}
- Area: 98.27 km^{2} (37.94 sq mi)
- Population (2023): 34,536
  - Density: 351.4/km^{2} (910.2/sq mi)
- INSEE code: 01 09

The canton of Gex is an administrative division in eastern France. At the French canton reorganisation which came into effect in March 2015, the canton was reduced from 11 to 7 communes:

1. Cessy
2. Divonne-les-Bains
3. Gex
4. Grilly
5. Sauverny
6. Versonnex
7. Vesancy

== Demographics ==
Historical population
Year	Pop.	±% p.a.
2013	28,702	—
2018	32,195	+2.32%
Source: INSEE

== See also ==
- Cantons of the Ain department
- Communes of France
