= Lélex =

Commune in Auvergne-Rhône-Alpes, France

Lélex Le Lèc (Arpitan)
- Commune
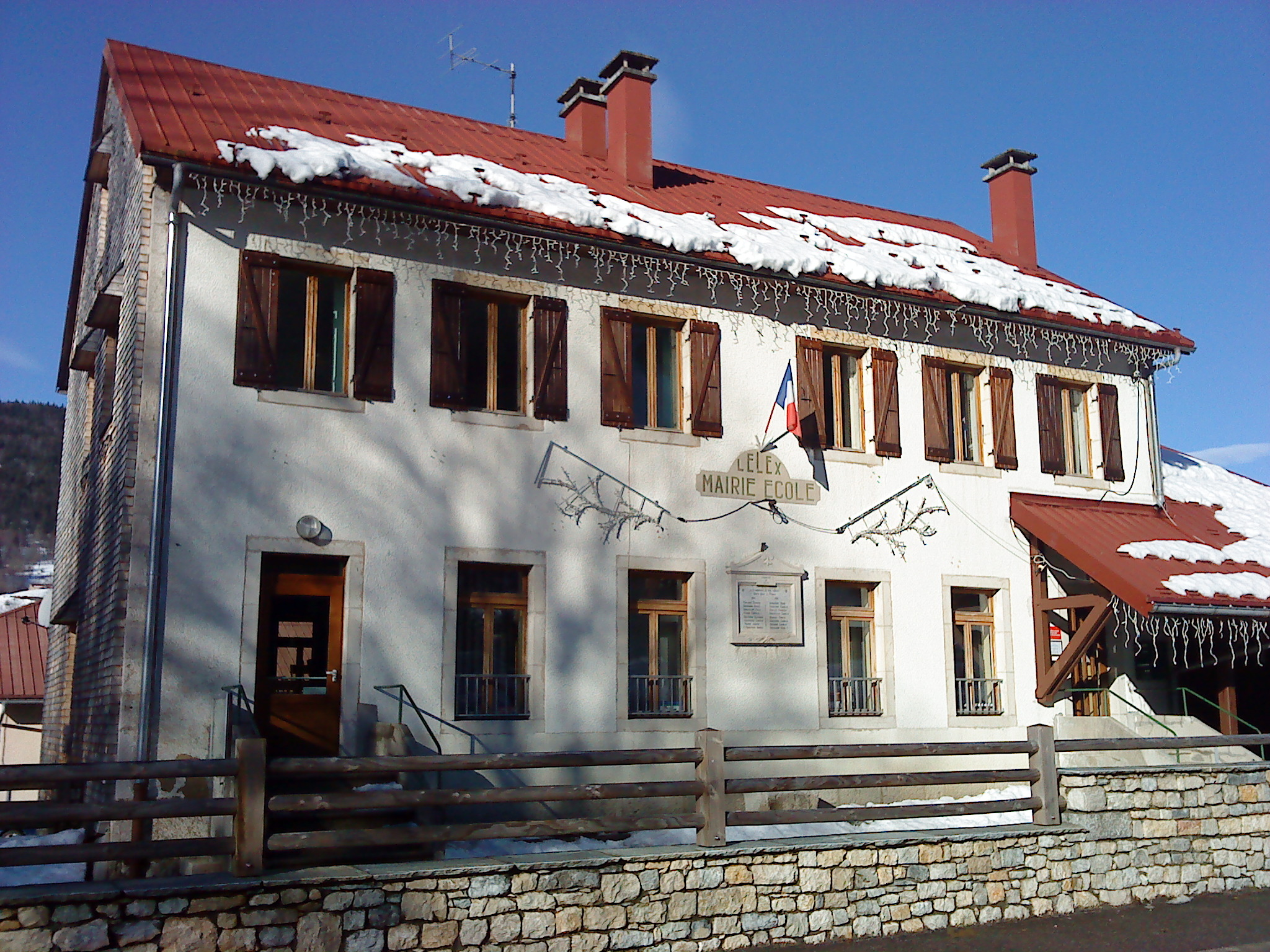
- Town hall

- Coat of arms
- Location of Lélex
- Location within France Location within Auvergne-Rhône-Alpes
- Coordinates: 46°18′17″N 5°56′36″E
- Country: France
- Region: Auvergne-Rhône-Alpes
- Department: Ain
- Arrondissement: Gex
- Canton: Thoiry
- Intercommunality: CA Pays de Gex

Government
  - Mayor (2026–32): Patrick Levrier
- Area^{1}: 17.7 km^{2} (6.8 sq mi)
- Elevation: 889 m (2,917 ft)
- Highest elevation: 1,703 m (5,587 ft)
- Lowest elevation: 720 m (2,360 ft)
- Population (2023): 241
  - Density: 13.6/km^{2} (35.3/sq mi)
- Time zone: UTC+01:00 (CET)
  - Summer (DST): UTC+02:00 (CEST)
- INSEE/Postal code: 01210 /01410
- ^{1} French Land Register data, which excludes lakes, ponds, glaciers > 1 km^{2} (0.386 sq mi or 247 acres) and river estuaries.

Lélex (French pronunciation: [lelɛks]; Arpitan: Le Lèc [lə le]) is a commune in the department of Ain, eastern France.

== Mountain sports ==
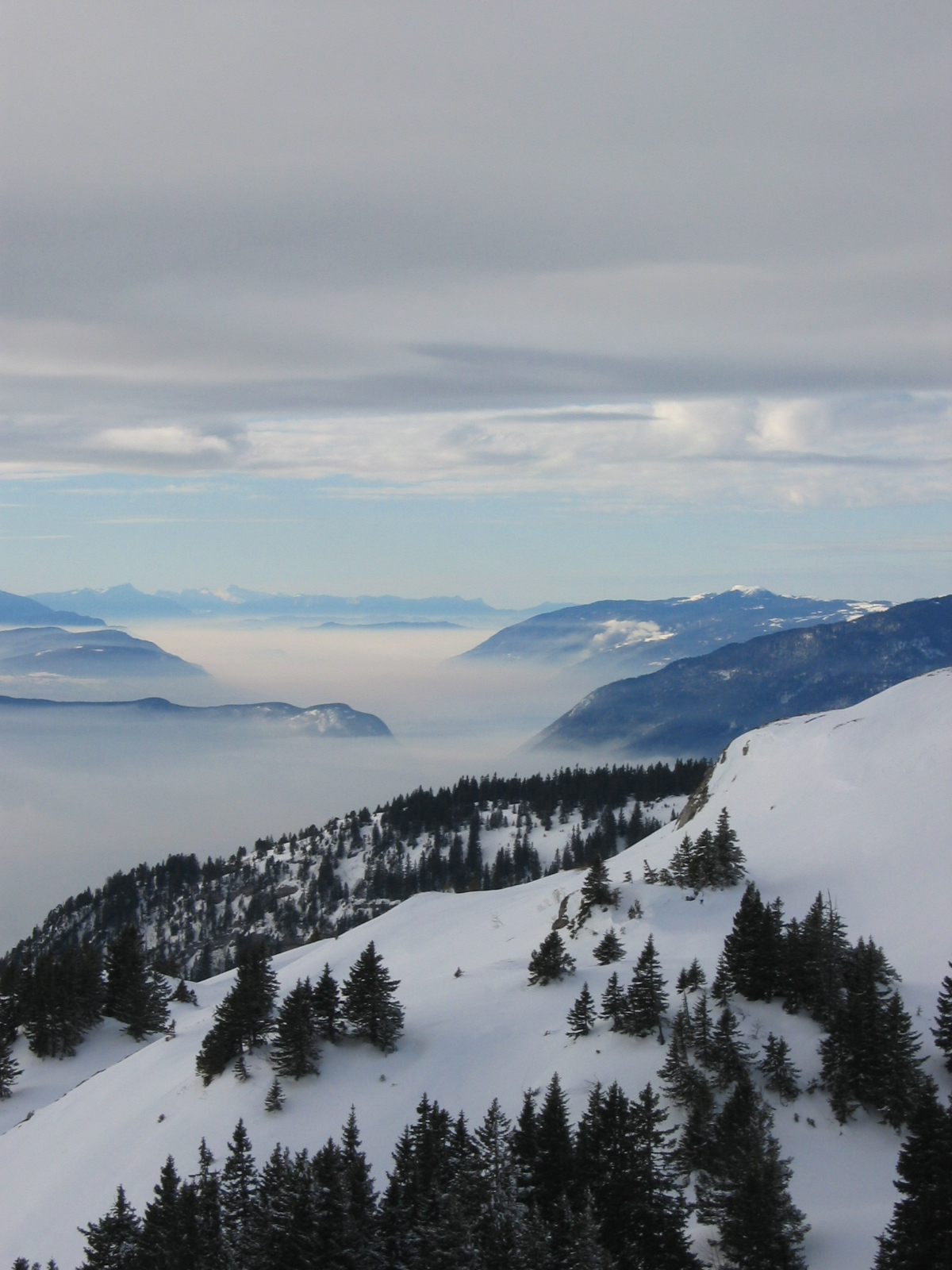
View from the top of the ski lift

Lélex is known as the highest ski resort of the Jura Mountains (1680 m).

== Population ==
Historical population
Year	Pop.	±% p.a.
1968	184	—
1975	183	−0.08%
1982	203	+1.49%
1990	232	+1.68%
1999	221	−0.54%
2007	225	+0.22%
2012	229	+0.35%
2017	227	−0.18%
2023	241	+1.00%
Source: INSEE

== See also ==
- Communes of the Ain department
