= Saint-Jean-de-Gonville =

Commune in Auvergne-Rhône-Alpes, France

- Commune
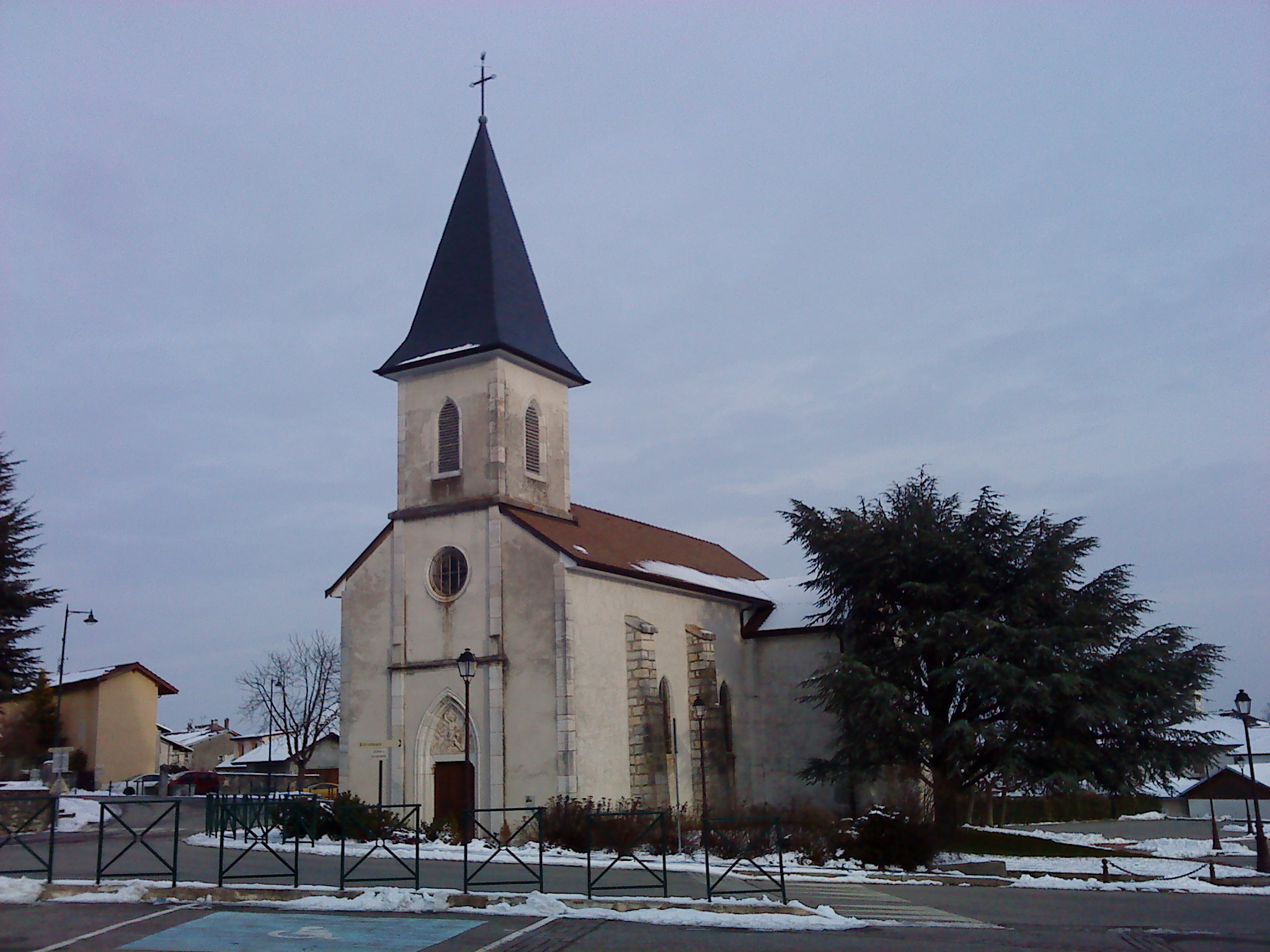

- Coat of arms
- Location of Saint-Jean-de-Gonville
- Location within France Location within Auvergne-Rhône-Alpes
- Coordinates: 46°13′00″N 5°57′00″E
- Country: France
- Region: Auvergne-Rhône-Alpes
- Department: Ain
- Arrondissement: Gex
- Canton: Thoiry
- Intercommunality: CA Pays de Gex

Government
  - Mayor (2026–32): Michel Brulhart
- Area^{1}: 12.36 km^{2} (4.77 sq mi)
- Highest elevation: 1,632 m (5,354 ft)
- Lowest elevation: 444 m (1,457 ft)
- Population (2023): 2,096
  - Density: 169.6/km^{2} (439.2/sq mi)
- Time zone: UTC+01:00 (CET)
  - Summer (DST): UTC+02:00 (CEST)
- INSEE/Postal code: 01360 /01630
- ^{1} French Land Register data, which excludes lakes, ponds, glaciers > 1 km^{2} (0.386 sq mi or 247 acres) and river estuaries.

Saint-Jean-de-Gonville (French pronunciation: [sɛ̃ ʒɑ̃ də ɡɔ̃vil]; Arpitan: Sant-Jian-de-Govèlyes) is a commune in the Ain department in eastern France.

== Population ==
Historical population
Year	Pop.	±% p.a.
1968	591	—
1975	742	+3.30%
1982	841	+1.81%
1990	1,001	+2.20%
1999	1,182	+1.86%
2007	1,420	+2.32%
2012	1,501	+1.12%
2017	1,787	+3.55%
2023	2,096	+2.69%
Source: INSEE

== See also ==
- Communes of the Ain department
