= Farges =

Commune in Auvergne-Rhône-Alpes, France

- Commune
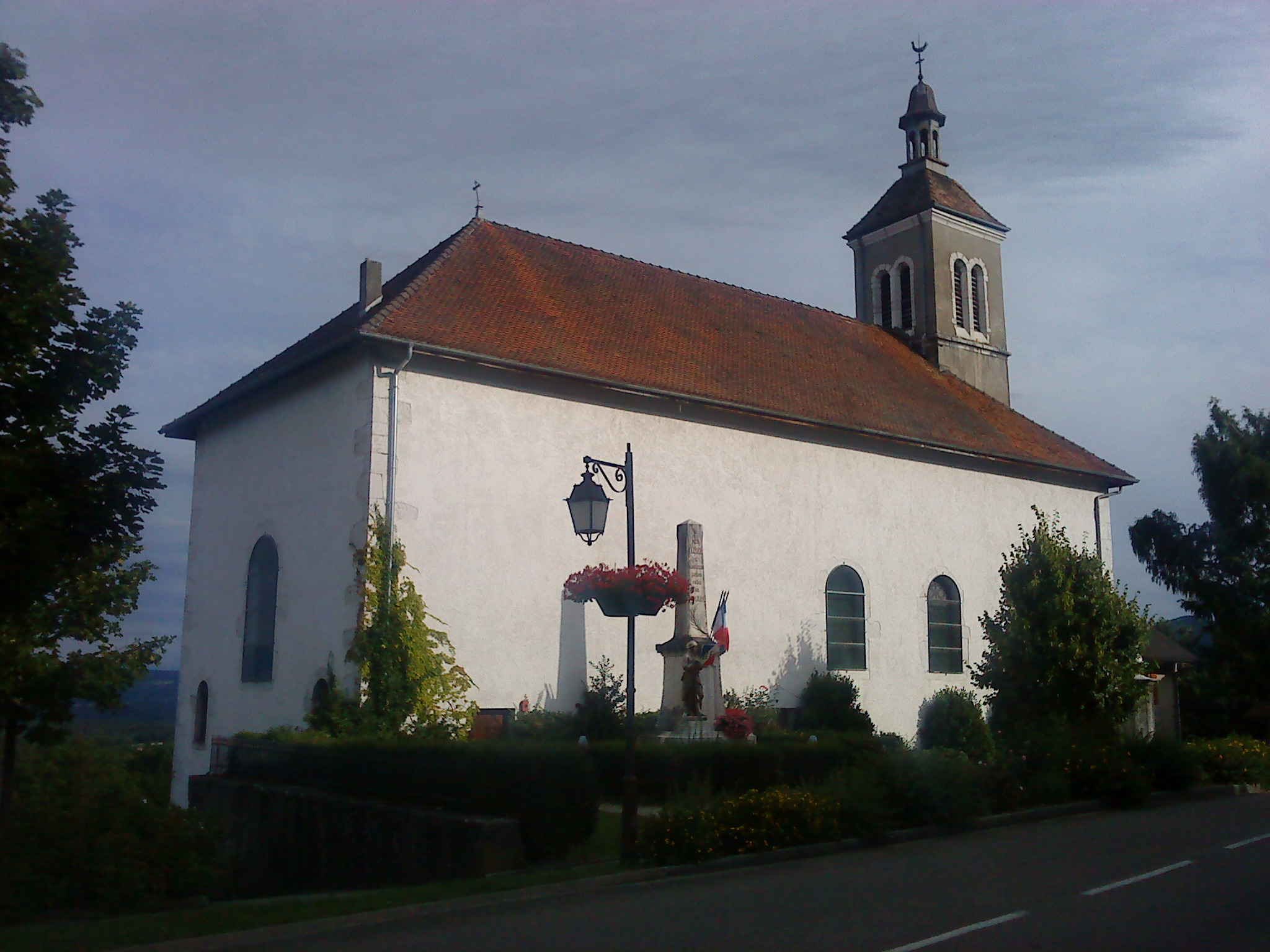
- Church of Saint Brice

- Coat of arms
- Location of Farges
- Location within France Location within Auvergne-Rhône-Alpes
- Coordinates: 46°10′04″N 5°54′19″E
- Country: France
- Region: Auvergne-Rhône-Alpes
- Department: Ain
- Arrondissement: Gex
- Canton: Thoiry
- Intercommunality: CA Pays de Gex

Government
  - Mayor (2026–32): Monique Graziotti
- Area^{1}: 14.28 km^{2} (5.51 sq mi)
- Elevation: 460 m (1,510 ft)
- Highest elevation: 1,527 m (5,010 ft)
- Lowest elevation: 360 m (1,180 ft)
- Population (2023): 1,082
  - Density: 75.77/km^{2} (196.2/sq mi)
- Time zone: UTC+01:00 (CET)
  - Summer (DST): UTC+02:00 (CEST)
- INSEE/Postal code: 01158 /01550
- ^{1} French Land Register data, which excludes lakes, ponds, glaciers > 1 km^{2} (0.386 sq mi or 247 acres) and river estuaries.

Farges (French pronunciation: [faʁʒ]) is a commune in the Ain department in eastern France.

== Population ==
Historical population
Year	Pop.	±% p.a.
1968	415	—
1975	456	+1.36%
1982	480	+0.74%
1990	559	+1.92%
1999	594	+0.68%
2007	825	+4.19%
2012	919	+2.18%
2017	1,038	+2.47%
2023	1,082	+0.69%
Source: INSEE

== See also ==
- Communes of the Ain department
