= Péron, Ain =

Commune in Auvergne-Rhône-Alpes, France

Péron
- Commune
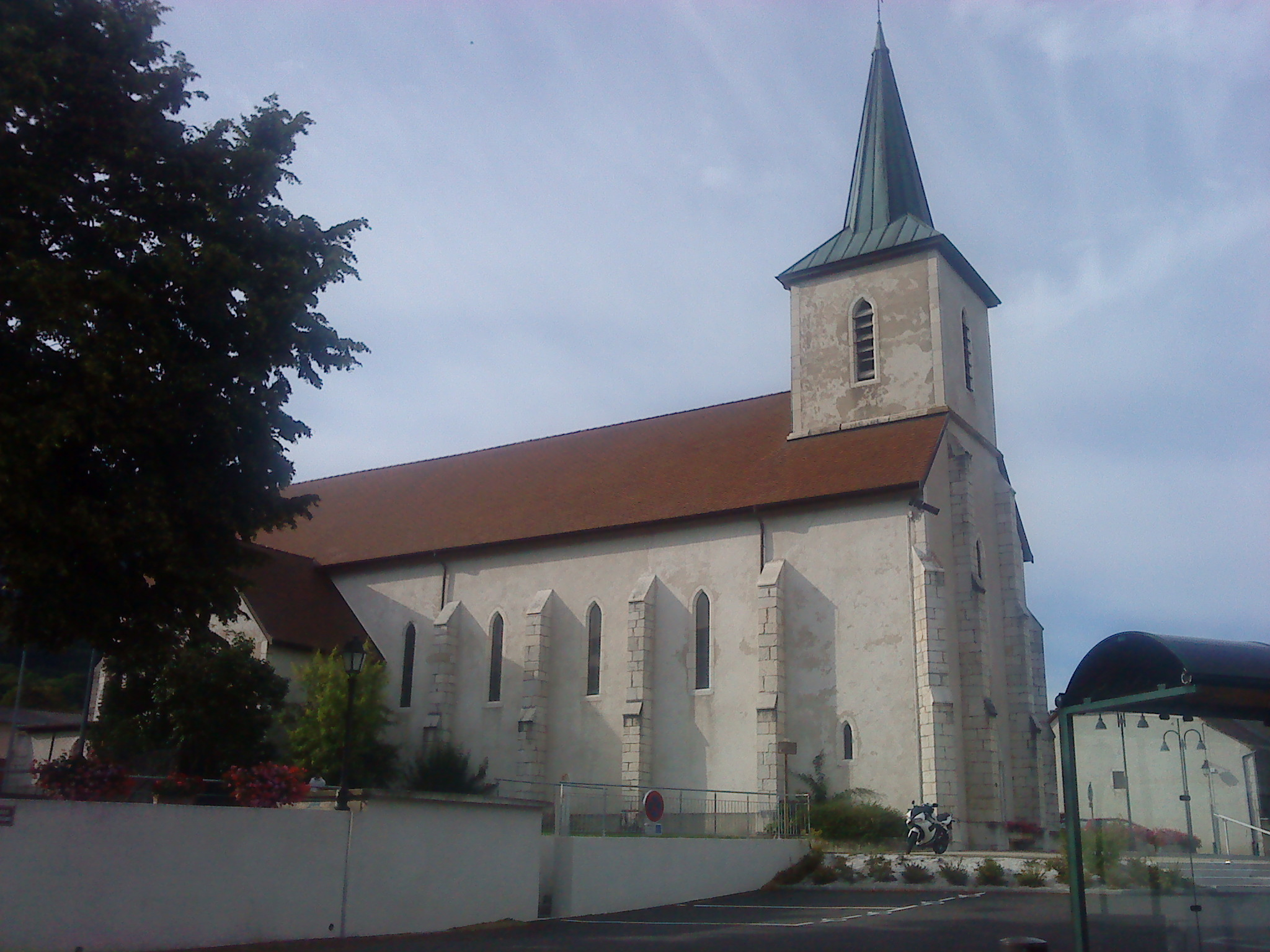
- Church of Saint Antoine

- Coat of arms
- Location of Péron
- Location within France Location within Auvergne-Rhône-Alpes
- Coordinates: 46°11′24″N 5°55′35″E
- Country: France
- Region: Auvergne-Rhône-Alpes
- Department: Ain
- Arrondissement: Gex
- Canton: Thoiry
- Intercommunality: CA Pays de Gex

Government
  - Mayor (2026–32): Françoise Ferrolliet
- Area^{1}: 26.01 km^{2} (10.04 sq mi)
- Elevation: 580 m (1,900 ft)
- Highest elevation: 1,501 m (4,925 ft)
- Lowest elevation: 411 m (1,348 ft)
- Population (2023): 2,916
  - Density: 112.1/km^{2} (290.4/sq mi)
- Time zone: UTC+01:00 (CET)
  - Summer (DST): UTC+02:00 (CEST)
- INSEE/Postal code: 01288 /01630
- ^{1} French Land Register data, which excludes lakes, ponds, glaciers > 1 km^{2} (0.386 sq mi or 247 acres) and river estuaries.

Péron (French pronunciation: [peʁɔ̃]) is a commune in the Ain department in eastern France.

== Population ==
Historical population

Year	Pop.	±% p.a.
1793	878	—
1800	1,003	+1.92%
1806	1,001	−0.03%
1821	1,188	+1.15%
1831	1,292	+0.84%
1836	1,312	+0.31%
1841	1,372	+0.90%
1846	1,327	−0.66%
1851	1,343	+0.24%
1856	1,305	−0.57%
1861	1,206	−1.57%
1866	1,145	−1.03%
1872	1,139	−0.09%
1876	1,127	−0.26%
1881	1,064	−1.14%
1886	1,116	+0.96%
1891	1,016	−1.86%
1896	1,189	+3.19%
1901	964	−4.11%

Year	Pop.	±% p.a.
1906	909	−1.17%
1911	838	−1.61%
1921	806	−0.39%
1926	798	−0.20%
1931	751	−1.21%
1936	764	+0.34%
1946	713	−0.69%
1954	696	−0.30%
1962	654	−0.78%
1968	701	+1.16%
1975	891	+3.49%
1982	1,005	+1.73%
1990	1,202	+2.26%
1999	1,579	+3.08%
2007	1,905	+2.37%
2012	2,324	+4.06%
2017	2,620	+2.43%
2023	2,916	+1.80%

Source: EHESS and INSEE (1968-2023)

== See also ==
- Communes of the Ain department
