= Pougny, Ain =

Commune in Auvergne-Rhône-Alpes, France

Pougny
- Commune
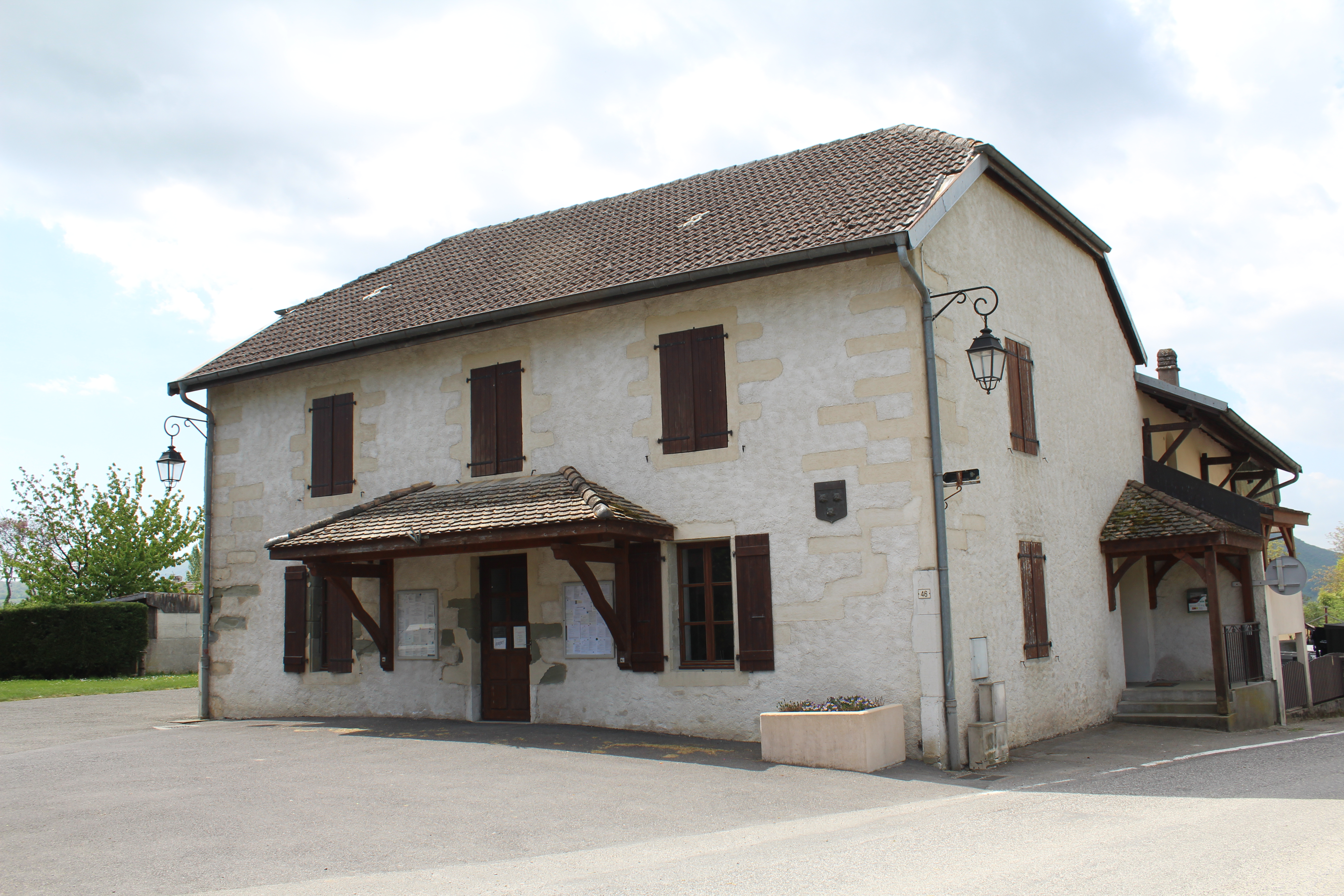
- Town hall

- Coat of arms
- Location of Pougny
- Location within France Location within Auvergne-Rhône-Alpes
- Coordinates: 46°08′22″N 5°57′01″E
- Country: France
- Region: Auvergne-Rhône-Alpes
- Department: Ain
- Arrondissement: Gex
- Canton: Thoiry
- Intercommunality: CA Pays de Gex

Government
  - Mayor (2026–32): Hervé Philippe
- Area^{1}: 7.77 km^{2} (3.00 sq mi)
- Elevation: 406 m (1,332 ft)
- Highest elevation: 461 m (1,512 ft)
- Lowest elevation: 333 m (1,093 ft)
- Population (2023): 871
  - Density: 112/km^{2} (290/sq mi)
- Time zone: UTC+01:00 (CET)
  - Summer (DST): UTC+02:00 (CEST)
- INSEE/Postal code: 01308 /01550
- ^{1} French Land Register data, which excludes lakes, ponds, glaciers > 1 km^{2} (0.386 sq mi or 247 acres) and river estuaries.

Pougny (French pronunciation: [puɲi]) is a commune in the Ain department in eastern France.

It lies near the border with Switzerland and is the first French village to be crossed by the Rhône, and a hydro-electric station constructed in 1926 which it shares with the Swiss village of Chancy is named after it.

== Population ==
Historical population
Year	Pop.	±% p.a.
1968	424	—
1975	543	+3.60%
1982	543	+0.00%
1990	600	+1.26%
1999	629	+0.53%
2007	747	+2.17%
2012	812	+1.68%
2017	812	+0.00%
2023	871	+1.18%
Source: INSEE

== Transportation ==
The commune has a railway station, Pougny—Chancy, on the Lyon–Geneva line. It has regular service to Bellegarde and Geneva.

== See also ==
- Communes of the Ain department
