= Échenevex =

Commune in Auvergne-Rhône-Alpes, France

Échenevex Èchenevê (Arpitan)
- Commune
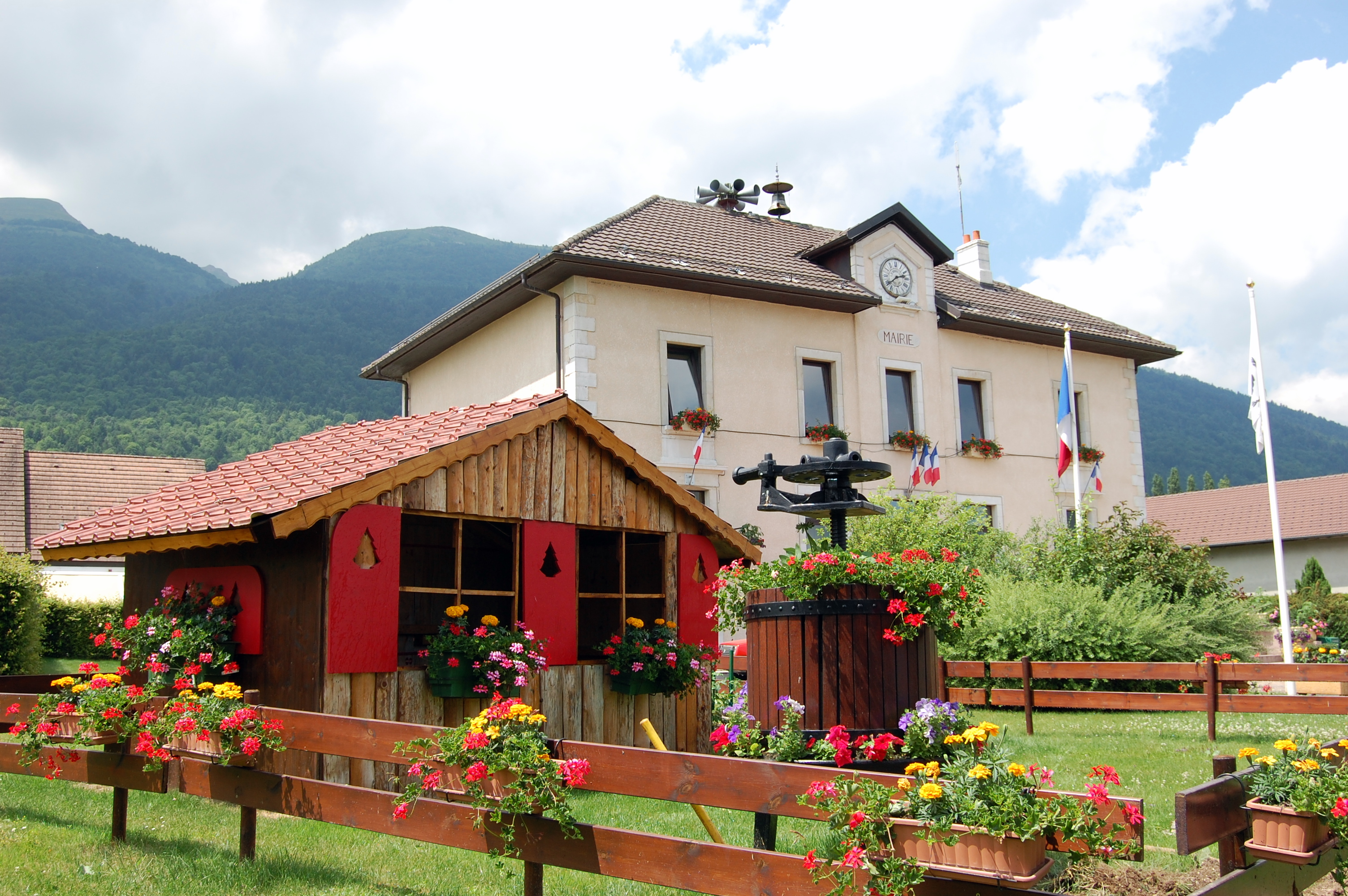
- Town hall

- Coat of arms
- Location of Échenevex
- Location within France Location within Auvergne-Rhône-Alpes
- Coordinates: 46°18′34″N 6°02′12″E
- Country: France
- Region: Auvergne-Rhône-Alpes
- Department: Ain
- Arrondissement: Gex
- Canton: Thoiry
- Intercommunality: CA Pays de Gex

Government
  - Mayor (2026–32): Amélie Van Ettinger
- Area^{1}: 16.44 km^{2} (6.35 sq mi)
- Elevation: 635 m (2,083 ft)
- Highest elevation: 1,682 m (5,518 ft)
- Lowest elevation: 490 m (1,610 ft)
- Population (2023): 2,328
  - Density: 141.6/km^{2} (366.8/sq mi)
- Time zone: UTC+01:00 (CET)
  - Summer (DST): UTC+02:00 (CEST)
- INSEE/Postal code: 01153 /01170
- ^{1} French Land Register data, which excludes lakes, ponds, glaciers > 1 km^{2} (0.386 sq mi or 247 acres) and river estuaries.

Échenevex (French pronunciation: [eʃnəvɛ]; Arpitan: Èchenevê [e.θən.ˈve]) is a commune in the Ain department in eastern France. As of 2020, it is the commune with the fifth highest median per capita income (€51,020 per year) in France.

== Geography ==
Échenevex is located between the Jura mountains and the Lake Geneva region. It is situated on the slopes of the Jura mountains, just 3 km south of Gex. The Large Hadron Collider passes under Échenevex, about 100 m below the surface. Echenevex consists partly of the Jura mountains natural park area and is approximately 8 minutes from the Crozet Telecabine ski station, and 15 minutes from Geneva International Airport.

== Population ==
Historical population
Year	Pop.	±% p.a.
1968	282	—
1975	371	+4.00%
1982	643	+8.17%
1990	997	+5.64%
1999	1,197	+2.05%
2007	1,500	+2.86%
2012	1,813	+3.86%
2017	2,132	+3.29%
2023	2,328	+1.48%
Source: INSEE

== Gallery ==
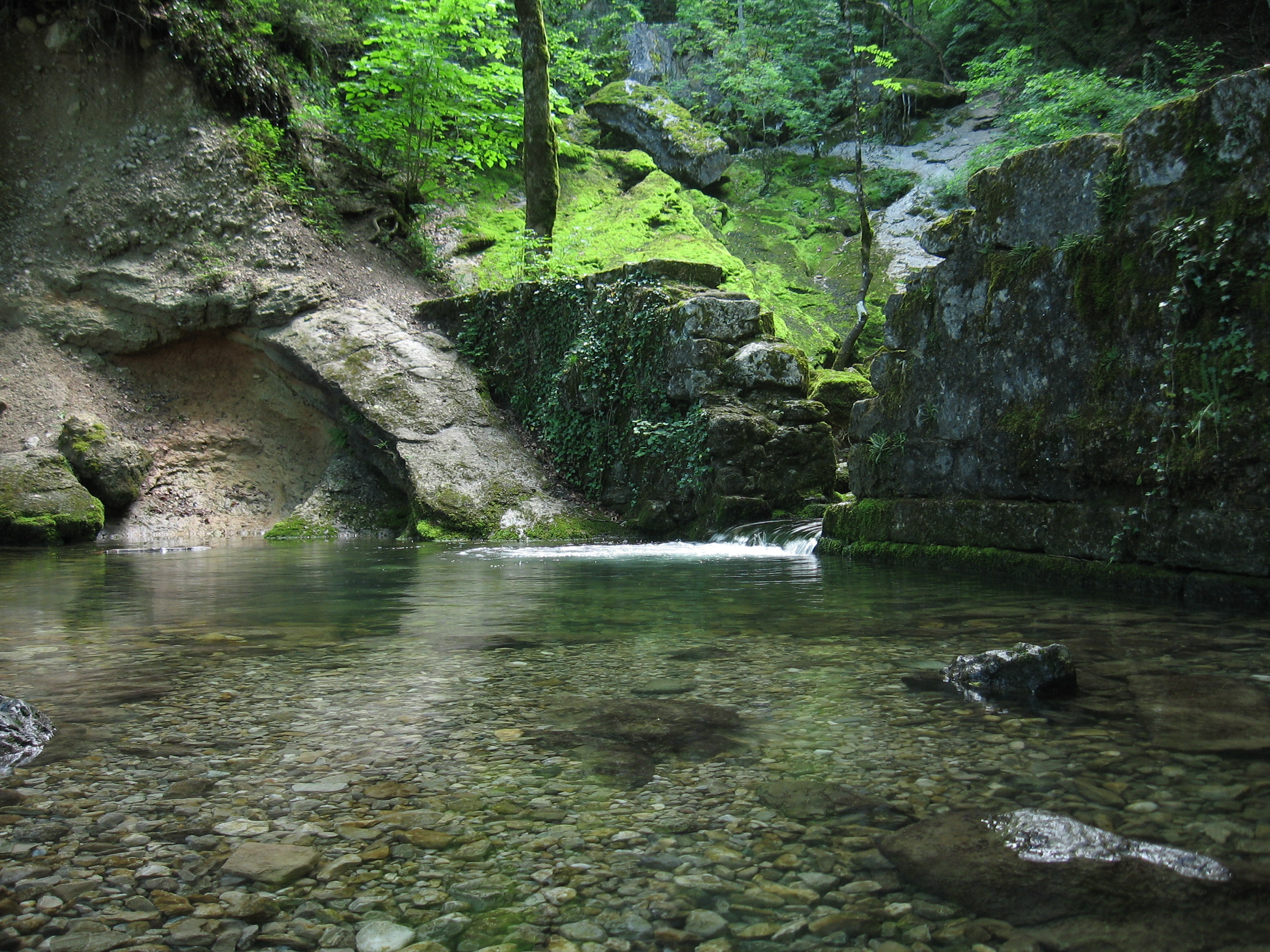
Source of the Allondon River

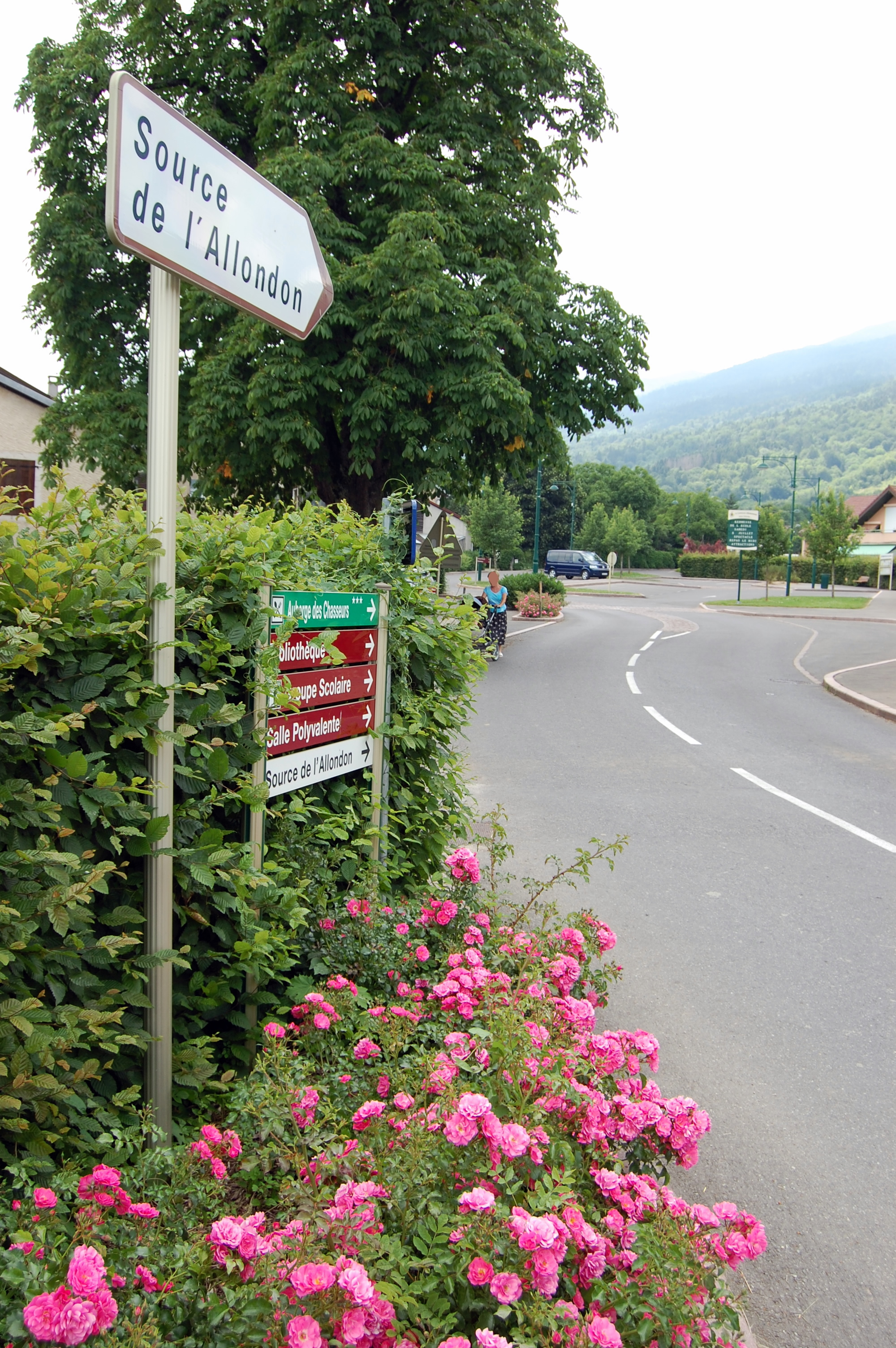
Way to Allondon source

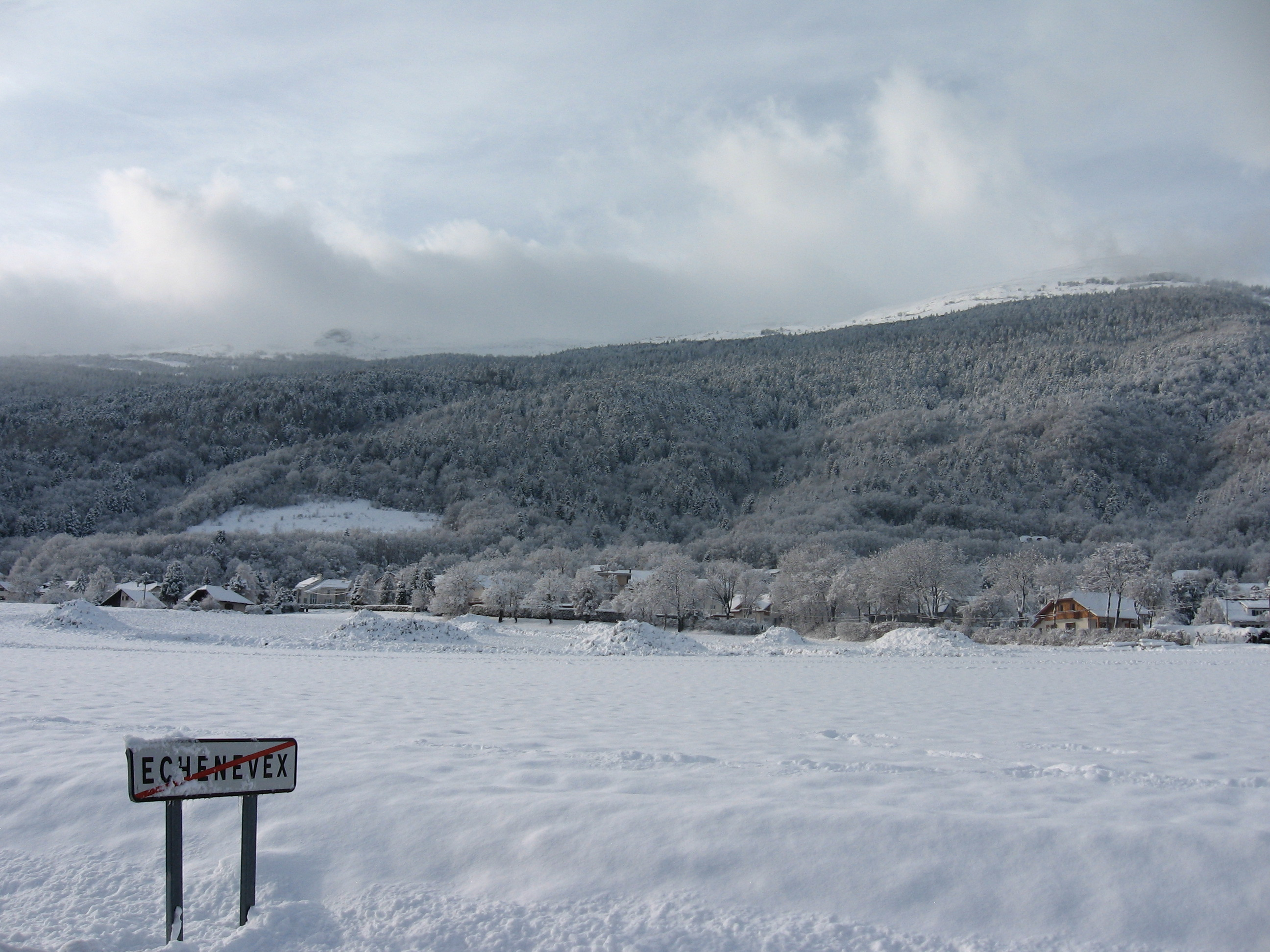
Echenevex in the snow
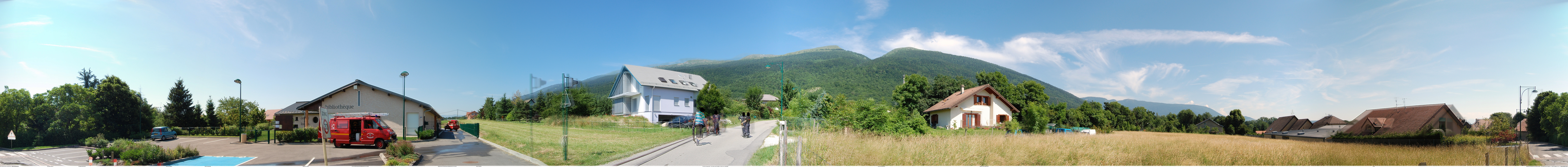
Panoramic view of Echenevex

== See also ==
- Communes of the Ain department
