= Chevry, Ain =

Commune in Auvergne-Rhône-Alpes, France

Chevry
- Commune
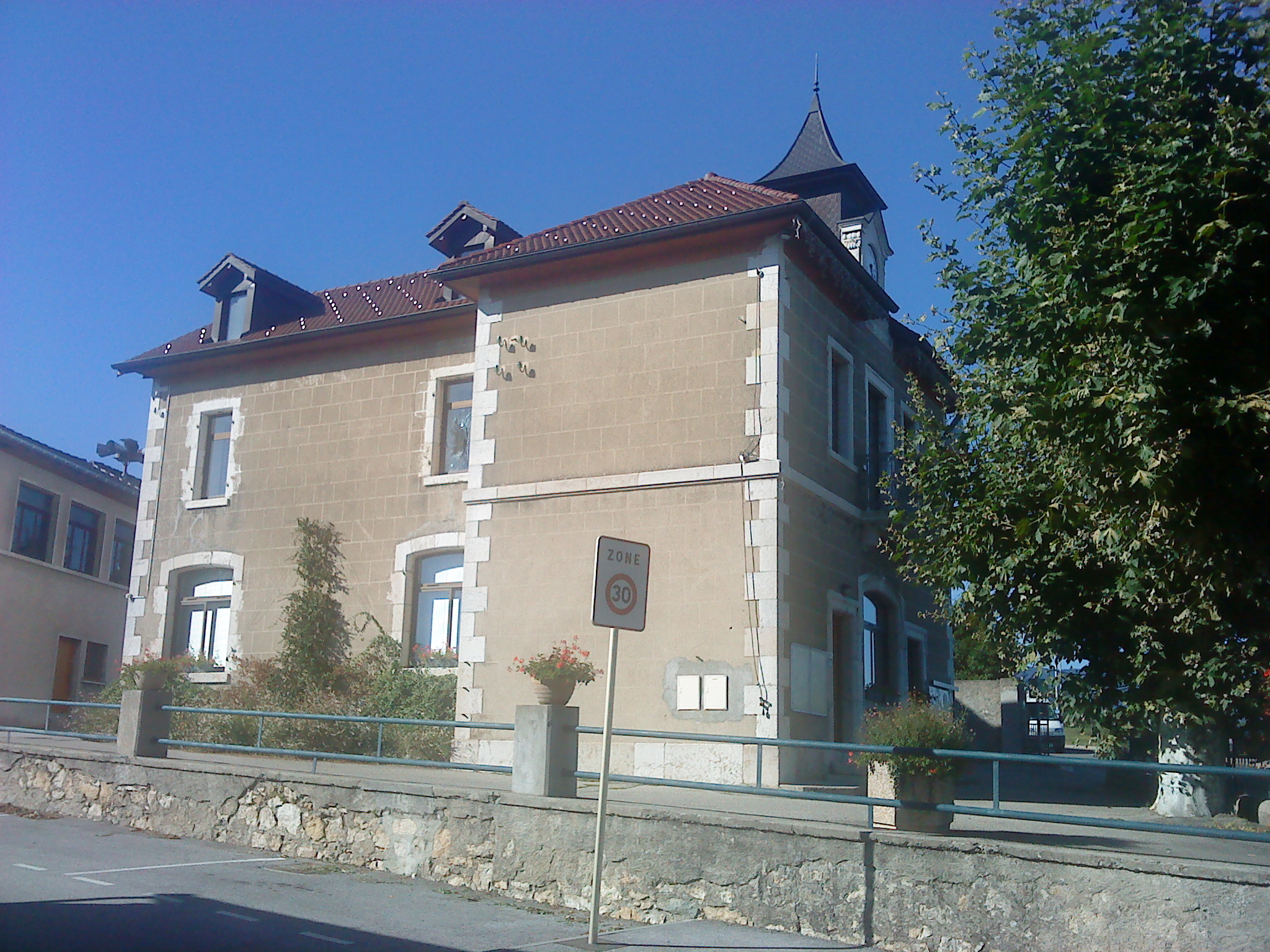
- Town hall

- Coat of arms
- Location of Chevry
- Location within France Location within Auvergne-Rhône-Alpes
- Coordinates: 46°16′51″N 6°02′13″E
- Country: France
- Region: Auvergne-Rhône-Alpes
- Department: Ain
- Arrondissement: Gex
- Canton: Thoiry
- Intercommunality: CA Pays de Gex

Government
  - Mayor (2026–32): Stéphane Mitzas
- Area^{1}: 5.84 km^{2} (2.25 sq mi)
- Elevation: 490 m (1,610 ft)
- Highest elevation: 580 m (1,900 ft)
- Lowest elevation: 457 m (1,499 ft)
- Population (2023): 2,372
  - Density: 406/km^{2} (1,050/sq mi)
- Time zone: UTC+01:00 (CET)
  - Summer (DST): UTC+02:00 (CEST)
- INSEE/Postal code: 01103 /01170
- ^{1} French Land Register data, which excludes lakes, ponds, glaciers > 1 km^{2} (0.386 sq mi or 247 acres) and river estuaries.

Chevry (French pronunciation: [ʃəvʁi]; Arpitan: Chevri) is a commune in the Ain department, in the region of Auvergne-Rhône-Alpes, eastern France. Chevry's inhabitants are called Chevrysiens.

Chevry is located between Gex and Saint-Genis-Pouilly, on the departmental highway RD984, which is the primary access to the town. It is twenty minutes from the Swiss border near Geneva. The commune also includes the villages of Veraz (to the east) and Naz-Dessous (to the north).

The town has several rivers: the Great Journans, Petit Journans, the Allondon and Janvoin.

== Population ==
Historical population
Year	Pop.	±% p.a.
1968	346	—
1975	574	+7.50%
1982	637	+1.50%
1990	733	+1.77%
1999	803	+1.02%
2007	1,151	+4.60%
2012	1,333	+2.98%
2017	1,812	+6.33%
2023	2,372	+4.59%
Source: INSEE

== See also ==
- Communes of the Ain department
