= Sauverny =

Commune in Auvergne-Rhône-Alpes, France

- Commune
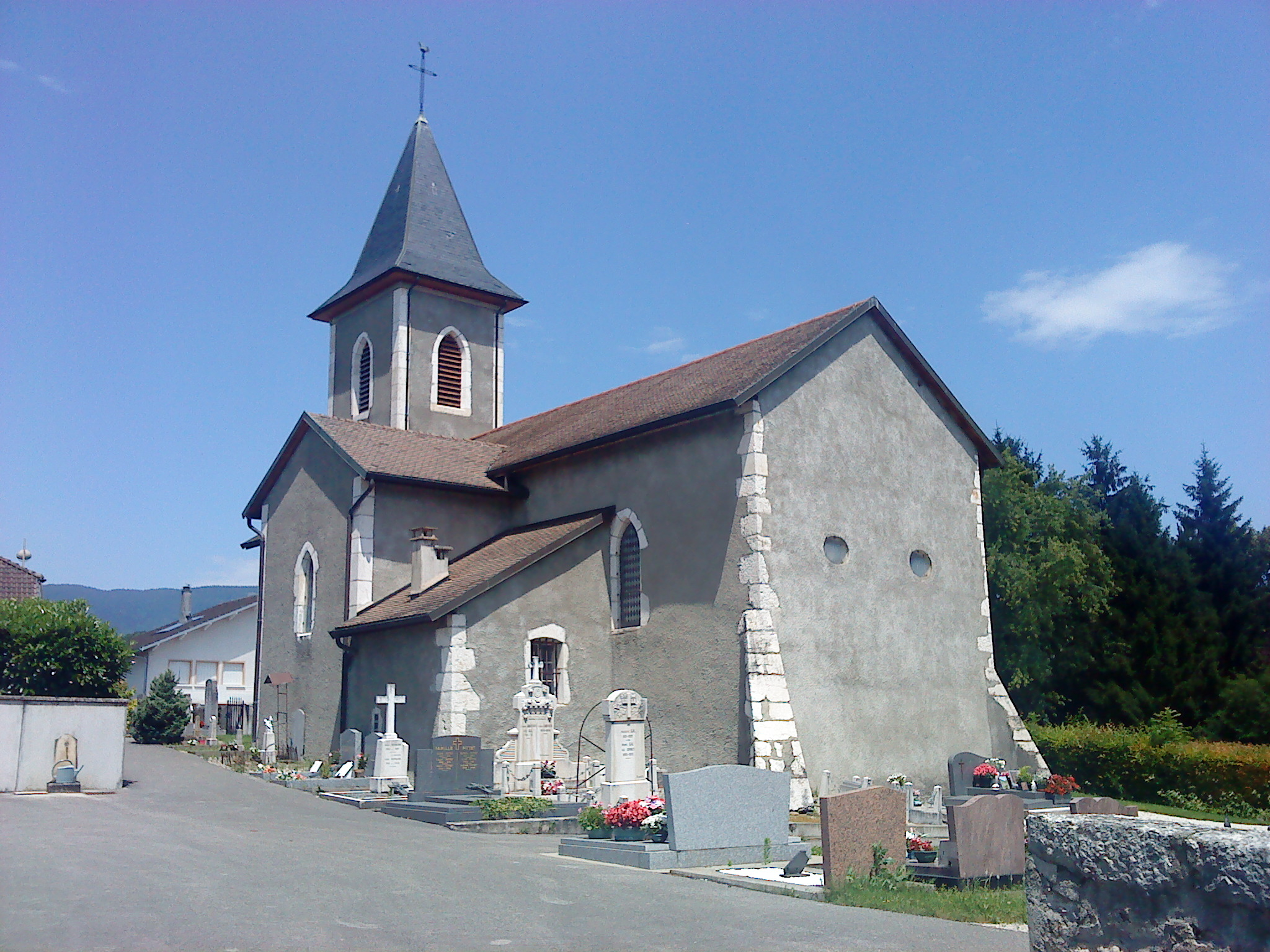
- Church of Saint Maurice

- Coat of arms
- Location of Sauverny
- Location within France Location within Auvergne-Rhône-Alpes
- Coordinates: 46°18′55″N 6°06′53″E
- Country: France
- Region: Auvergne-Rhône-Alpes
- Department: Ain
- Arrondissement: Gex
- Canton: Gex
- Intercommunality: CA Pays de Gex

Government
  - Mayor (2026–32): Julien Fournier
- Area^{1}: 1.89 km^{2} (0.73 sq mi)
- Elevation: 476 m (1,562 ft)
- Highest elevation: 516 m (1,693 ft)
- Lowest elevation: 449 m (1,473 ft)
- Population (2023): 1,022
  - Density: 541/km^{2} (1,400/sq mi)
- Time zone: UTC+01:00 (CET)
  - Summer (DST): UTC+02:00 (CEST)
- INSEE/Postal code: 01397 /01220
- ^{1} French Land Register data, which excludes lakes, ponds, glaciers > 1 km^{2} (0.386 sq mi or 247 acres) and river estuaries.

Sauverny (French pronunciation: [sovɛʁni]; Arpitan: Sovèrnê) is a commune in the Ain department in eastern France. It is located between the Jura mountains in France and Lac Leman, bordering the Canton of Geneva, Switzerland.

== Population ==
Historical population
Year	Pop.	±% p.a.
1968	170	—
1975	220	+3.75%
1982	555	+14.13%
1990	1,067	+8.51%
1999	1,015	−0.55%
2007	1,108	+1.10%
2012	1,070	−0.70%
2017	1,009	−1.17%
2023	1,022	+0.21%
2020	988	−1.13%
Source: INSEE

== See also ==
- Communes of the Ain department
