= Challex =

Commune in Auvergne-Rhône-Alpes, France

Challex Chalês (Arpitan)
- Commune
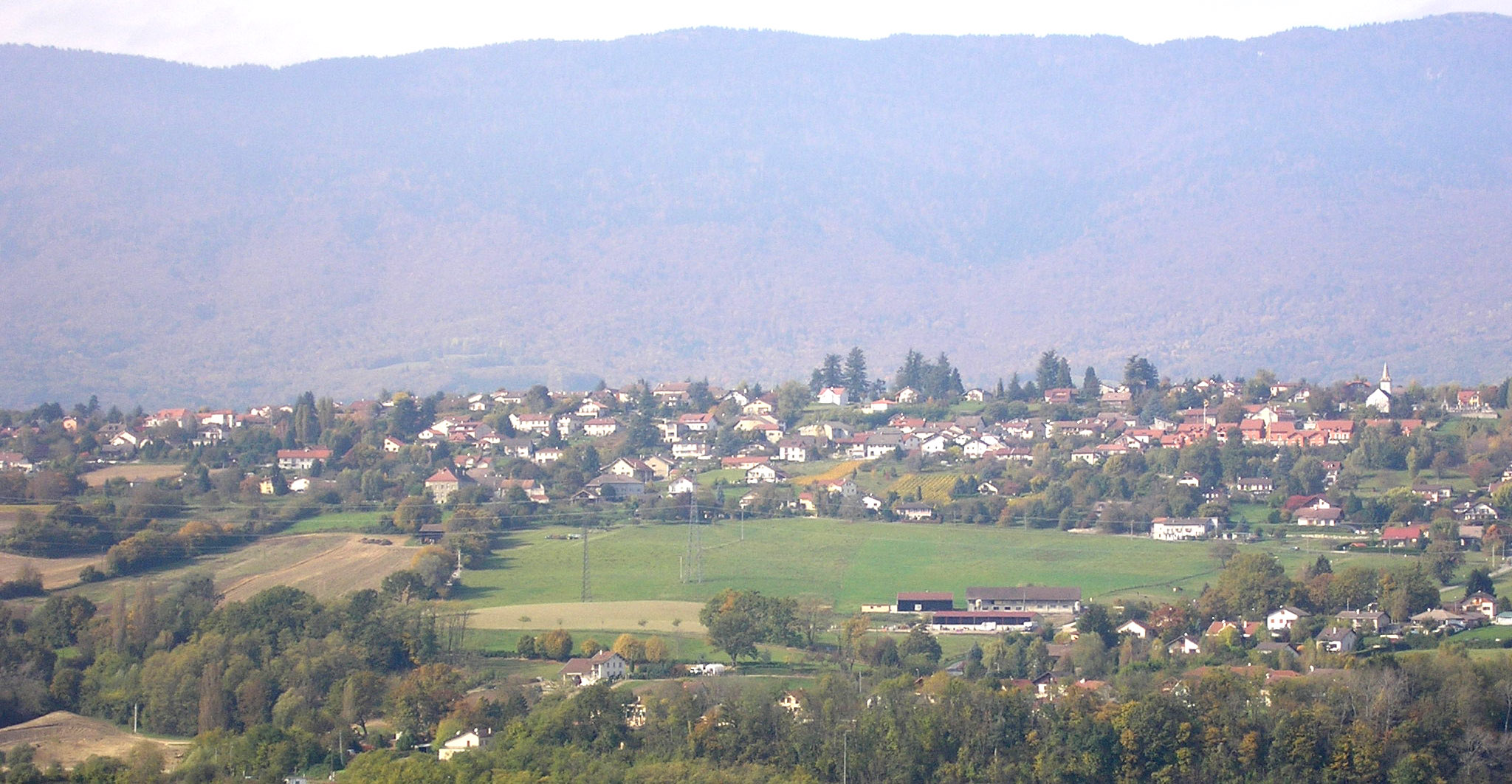

- Coat of arms
- Location of Challex
- Location within France Location within Auvergne-Rhône-Alpes
- Coordinates: 46°10′53″N 5°58′33″E
- Country: France
- Region: Auvergne-Rhône-Alpes
- Department: Ain
- Arrondissement: Gex
- Canton: Thoiry
- Intercommunality: CA Pays de Gex

Government
  - Mayor (2026–32): Aline Hofer Favre
- Area^{1}: 8.67 km^{2} (3.35 sq mi)
- Elevation: 525 m (1,722 ft)
- Highest elevation: 516 m (1,693 ft)
- Lowest elevation: 330 m (1,080 ft)
- Population (2023): 1,632
  - Density: 188/km^{2} (488/sq mi)
- Time zone: UTC+01:00 (CET)
  - Summer (DST): UTC+02:00 (CEST)
- INSEE/Postal code: 01078 /01630
- ^{1} French Land Register data, which excludes lakes, ponds, glaciers > 1 km^{2} (0.386 sq mi or 247 acres) and river estuaries.

Challex (French pronunciation: [ʃalɛ]) is a commune in the Ain department in eastern France.

== Population ==
Historical population
Year	Pop.	±% p.a.
1968	545	—
1975	712	+3.89%
1982	817	+1.98%
1990	967	+2.13%
1999	1,057	+0.99%
2007	1,073	+0.19%
2012	1,389	+5.30%
2017	1,481	+1.29%
2023	1,632	+1.63%
Source: INSEE

== See also ==
- Communes of the Ain department
