= Sergy, Ain =

Commune in Auvergne-Rhône-Alpes, France

Sergy
- Commune
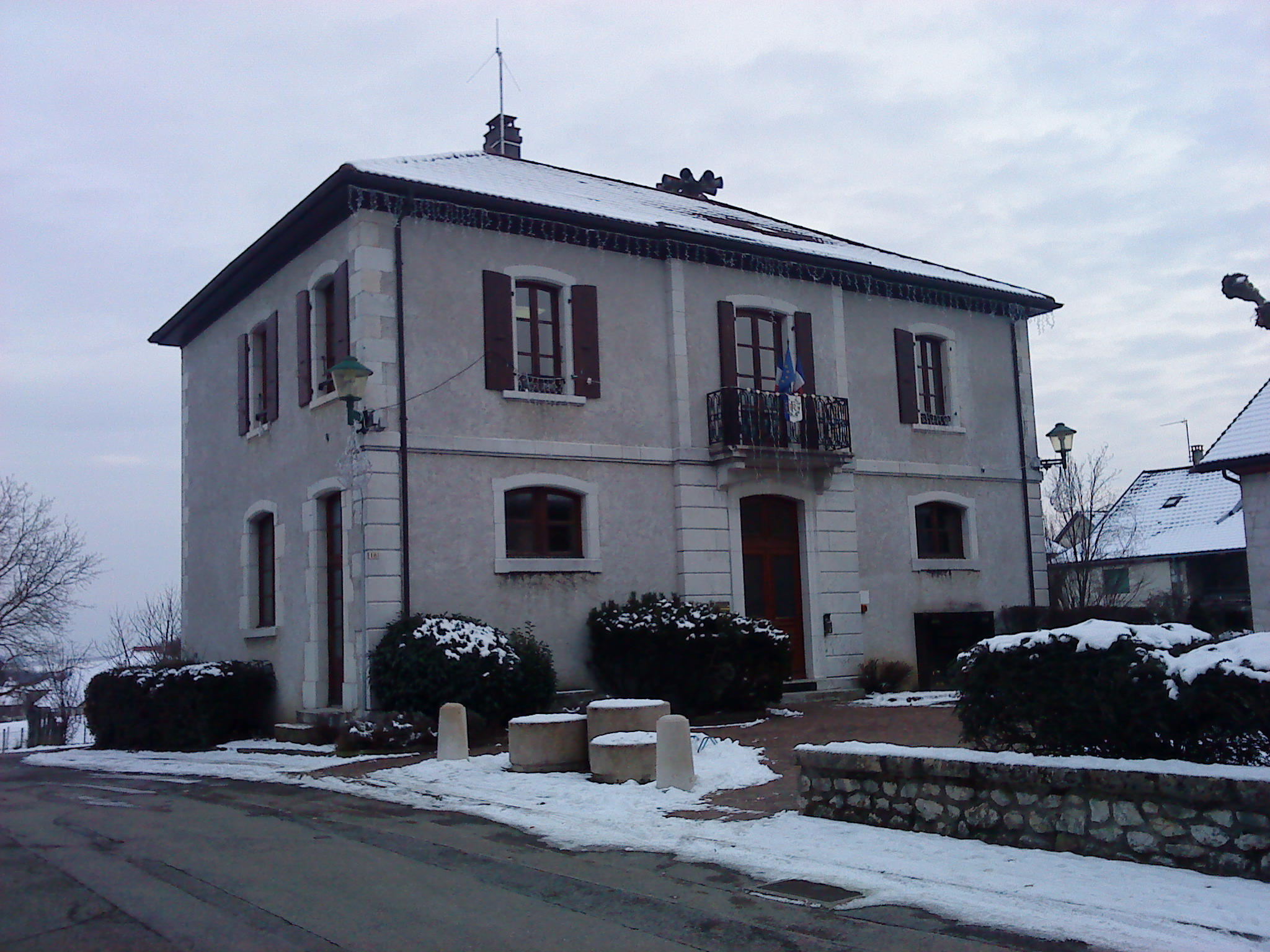
- Town hall

- Coat of arms
- Location of Sergy
- Location within France Location within Auvergne-Rhône-Alpes
- Coordinates: 46°15′07″N 5°59′56″E
- Country: France
- Region: Auvergne-Rhône-Alpes
- Department: Ain
- Arrondissement: Gex
- Canton: Thoiry
- Intercommunality: CA Pays de Gex

Government
  - Mayor (2026–32): Catherine Moine
- Area^{1}: 9.46 km^{2} (3.65 sq mi)
- Elevation: 475 m (1,558 ft)
- Highest elevation: 1,718 m (5,636 ft)
- Lowest elevation: 439 m (1,440 ft)
- Population (2023): 2,288
  - Density: 242/km^{2} (626/sq mi)
- Time zone: UTC+01:00 (CET)
  - Summer (DST): UTC+02:00 (CEST)
- INSEE/Postal code: 01401 /01630
- ^{1} French Land Register data, which excludes lakes, ponds, glaciers > 1 km^{2} (0.386 sq mi or 247 acres) and river estuaries.

Sergy (French pronunciation: [sɛʁʒi]; Arpitan: Sèrgi) is a commune in the Ain department in eastern France.

== History ==
At the time of Roman occupation under Julius Caesar, a certain Sergius was rewarded with land - over time a small village developed around his home. Sergy was under Roman control for 464 years.

In the Middle Ages, the Sergier family administered Sergy until 1533. This family also founded a chapel.

In 1536, the Pays de Gex was invaded by the Bernese, and Protestantism was imposed by the de Martine family. The Sergier church became the Religionnaires temple.

In 1589, the Genevese took possession of the area, and in 1600 it became part of Catholic France. The temple in Sergy remained a Protestant church.

In 1685, the king forbade the reformed Protestant religion, and the temple was destroyed. In need of money, the de Martine family mortgaged Sergy, which was divided into "Sergy haut" (high Sergy) and "Sergy bas" (low Sergy). The castle, situated towards the lower end of the village, was in very bad condition when the Genevan family, the Buissons, became the owners in 1755.

In 1779, Pierre Pictet (the husband of a member of the Buisson family) became lord of Sergy until the French revolution. During this period, a church was built in the lower village. This is the same church as is found in Sergy today.

The "haut" and "bas" division remains today, and while lower Sergy stretches toward the border of St.Genis-Pouilly to the South, the northern edge of high Sergy meets the foot of the Jura Mountains (a sub-alpine mountain range that traces the France-Switzerland border).

== Population ==
Historical population

Year	Pop.	±% p.a.
1793	245	—
1800	297	+2.79%
1806	323	+1.41%
1821	357	+0.67%
1831	359	+0.06%
1836	385	+1.41%
1841	412	+1.36%
1846	385	−1.35%
1851	387	+0.10%
1856	397	+0.51%
1861	384	−0.66%
1866	347	−2.01%
1872	353	+0.29%
1876	337	−1.15%
1881	334	−0.18%
1886	337	+0.18%
1891	343	+0.35%
1896	303	−2.45%
1901	337	+2.15%

Year	Pop.	±% p.a.
1906	302	−2.17%
1911	309	+0.46%
1921	267	−1.45%
1926	267	+0.00%
1931	253	−1.07%
1936	256	+0.24%
1946	262	+0.23%
1954	274	+0.56%
1962	271	−0.14%
1968	297	+1.54%
1975	605	+10.70%
1982	946	+6.59%
1990	1,201	+3.03%
1999	1,247	+0.42%
2007	1,571	+2.93%
2012	2,035	+5.31%
2017	2,084	+0.48%
2023	2,288	+1.57%

Source: EHESS and INSEE (1968-2023)

== See also ==
- Communes of the Ain department
