= Cessy =

Commune in Auvergne-Rhône-Alpes, France

- Commune
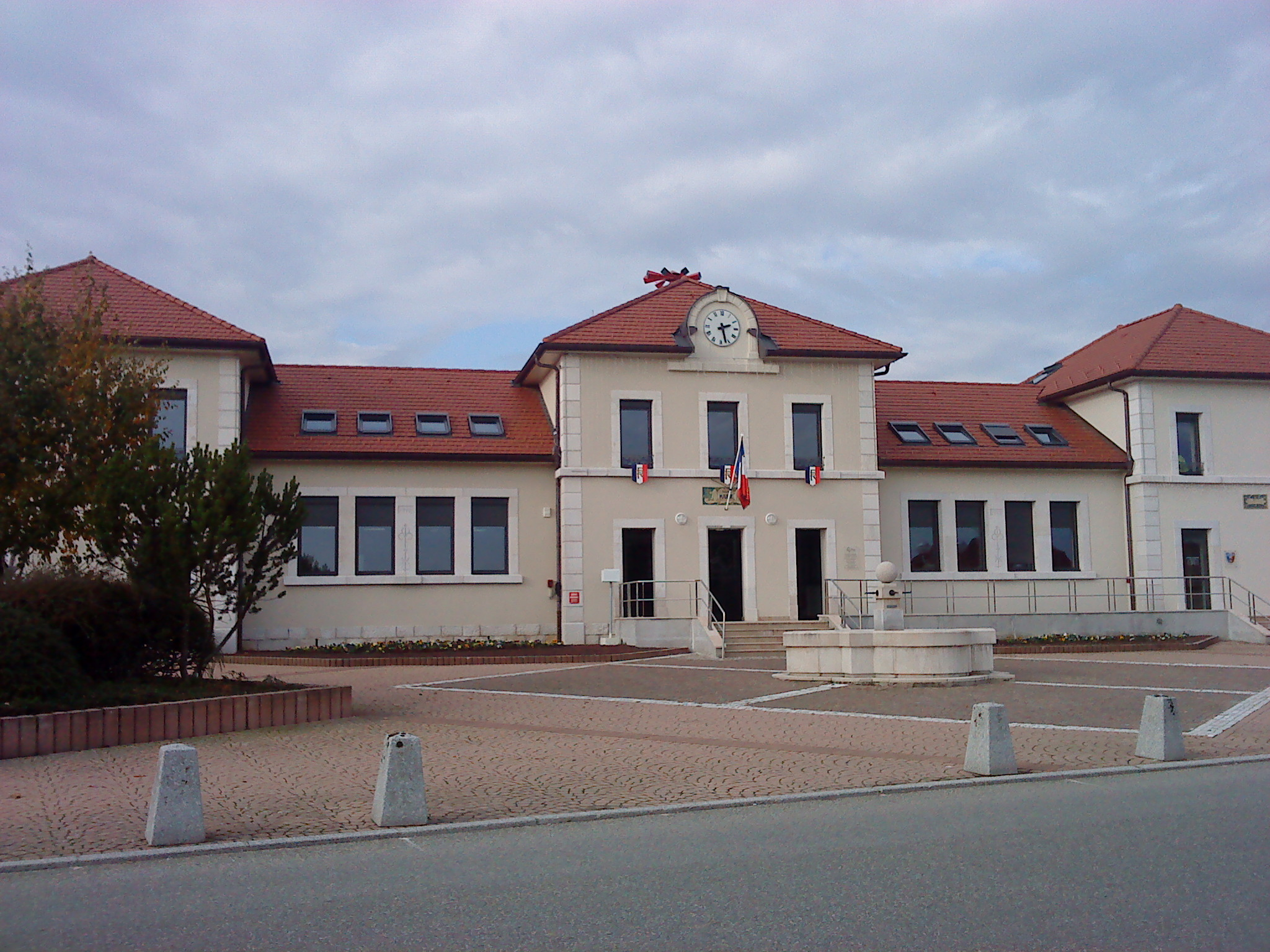
- Town hall

- Coat of arms
- Location of Cessy
- Location within France Location within Auvergne-Rhône-Alpes
- Coordinates: 46°19′09″N 6°04′12″E
- Country: France
- Region: Auvergne-Rhône-Alpes
- Department: Ain
- Arrondissement: Gex
- Canton: Gex
- Intercommunality: CA Pays de Gex

Government
  - Mayor (2026–32): Christophe Bouvier
- Area^{1}: 6.39 km^{2} (2.47 sq mi)
- Elevation: 526 m (1,726 ft)
- Highest elevation: 583 m (1,913 ft)
- Lowest elevation: 496 m (1,627 ft)
- Population (2023): 5,832
  - Density: 913/km^{2} (2,360/sq mi)
- Time zone: UTC+01:00 (CET)
  - Summer (DST): UTC+02:00 (CEST)
- INSEE/Postal code: 01071 /01170
- ^{1} French Land Register data, which excludes lakes, ponds, glaciers > 1 km^{2} (0.386 sq mi or 247 acres) and river estuaries.

Cessy (French pronunciation: [sesi]) is a commune in the Ain department in eastern France. The area was first inhabited by two farming families in the eleventh century, and as the town has grown its agricultural heritage has remained a significant feature, with the populated area surrounded by a vast expanse of fields and an annual agricultural festival.

== Geography ==
=== Climate ===
Cessy has an oceanic climate (Köppen climate classification Cfb). The average annual temperature in Cessy is 10.9 °C (51.6 °F). The average annual rainfall is 1,063.2 mm (41.86 in) with December as the wettest month. The temperatures are highest on average in July, at around 20.5 °C (68.9 °F), and lowest in January, at around 1.8 °C (35.2 °F). The highest temperature ever recorded in Cessy was 37.8 °C (100.0 °F) on 13 August 2003; the coldest temperature ever recorded was −16.3 °C (2.7 °F) on 1 February 2003.

Climate data for Cessy (1991−2020 normals, extremes 2002−present)
Month	Jan	Feb	Mar	Apr	May	Jun	Jul	Aug	Sep	Oct	Nov	Dec	Year
Record high °C (°F)	17.4 (63.3)	19.5 (67.1)	22.4 (72.3)	26.5 (79.7)	32.8 (91.0)	35.5 (95.9)	37.6 (99.7)	37.8 (100.0)	30.7 (87.3)	26.8 (80.2)	21.4 (70.5)	16.0 (60.8)	37.8 (100.0)
Mean daily maximum °C (°F)	4.9 (40.8)	6.3 (43.3)	11.2 (52.2)	16.2 (61.2)	19.6 (67.3)	24.6 (76.3)	26.7 (80.1)	25.9 (78.6)	21.5 (70.7)	15.7 (60.3)	9.6 (49.3)	5.4 (41.7)	15.6 (60.1)
Daily mean °C (°F)	1.8 (35.2)	2.5 (36.5)	6.4 (43.5)	10.8 (51.4)	14.3 (57.7)	18.7 (65.7)	20.5 (68.9)	19.9 (67.8)	16.1 (61.0)	11.5 (52.7)	6.3 (43.3)	2.4 (36.3)	10.9 (51.6)
Mean daily minimum °C (°F)	−1.2 (29.8)	−1.4 (29.5)	1.7 (35.1)	5.3 (41.5)	8.9 (48.0)	12.9 (55.2)	14.3 (57.7)	13.9 (57.0)	10.8 (51.4)	7.4 (45.3)	2.9 (37.2)	−0.5 (31.1)	6.3 (43.3)
Record low °C (°F)	−13.9 (7.0)	−16.3 (2.7)	−11.0 (12.2)	−6.0 (21.2)	−0.4 (31.3)	2.6 (36.7)	6.7 (44.1)	6.3 (43.3)	1.6 (34.9)	−3.4 (25.9)	−10.0 (14.0)	−14.7 (5.5)	−16.3 (2.7)
Average precipitation mm (inches)	106.0 (4.17)	75.8 (2.98)	77.9 (3.07)	66.7 (2.63)	87.0 (3.43)	85.4 (3.36)	81.1 (3.19)	86.5 (3.41)	63.0 (2.48)	101.6 (4.00)	110.1 (4.33)	122.1 (4.81)	1,063.2 (41.86)
Average precipitation days (≥ 1.0 mm)	11.2	8.4	9.3	8.1	11.3	9.3	9.0	9.0	7.2	9.6	9.3	10.8	112.5
Source: Météo-France

== Population ==
Historical population
Year	Pop.	±% p.a.
1968	509	—
1975	770	+6.09%
1982	1,068	+4.78%
1990	1,763	+6.47%
1999	2,283	+2.91%
2007	3,368	+4.98%
2012	4,342	+5.21%
2017	4,856	+2.26%
2023	5,832	+3.10%
Source: INSEE

== Compact Muon Solenoid ==
One of the primary points of interest in the quiet community of Cessy, France is the Compact Muon Solenoid (CMS) experiment, located 100 meters below ground at a site on the south-eastern edge of the village. CMS is a high-energy particle physics experiment which observes the result of high energy proton-proton collisions of the CERN laboratory's Large Hadron Collider (LHC) particle accelerator.

== Personalities ==
Tim Berners-Lee lived on Rue de la Mairie in Cessy when he, with Robert Cailliau, invented the World Wide Web.

== See also ==
- Communes of the Ain department
- Compact Muon Solenoid
