= Léaz =

Commune in Auvergne-Rhône-Alpes, France

Léaz Lèya (Arpitan)
- Commune
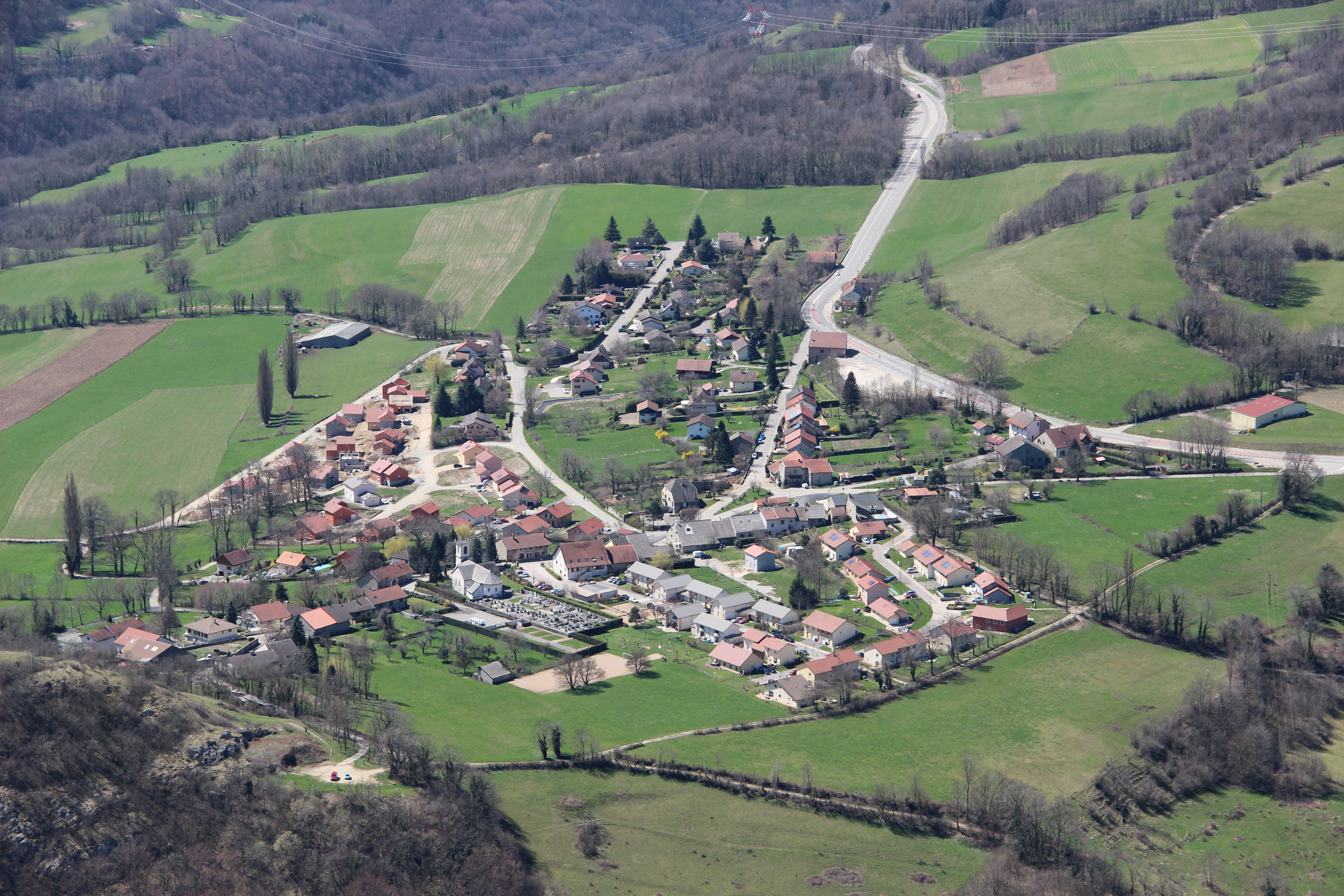

- Coat of arms
- Location of Léaz
- Location within France Location within Auvergne-Rhône-Alpes
- Coordinates: 46°05′53″N 5°53′12″E
- Country: France
- Region: Auvergne-Rhône-Alpes
- Department: Ain
- Arrondissement: Gex
- Canton: Thoiry
- Intercommunality: CA Pays de Gex

Government
  - Mayor (2026–32): François Raisin
- Area^{1}: 11.4 km^{2} (4.4 sq mi)
- Elevation: 446 m (1,463 ft)
- Highest elevation: 1,507 m (4,944 ft)
- Lowest elevation: 330 m (1,080 ft)
- Population (2023): 912
  - Density: 80.0/km^{2} (207/sq mi)
- Time zone: UTC+01:00 (CET)
  - Summer (DST): UTC+02:00 (CEST)
- INSEE/Postal code: 01209 /01200
- ^{1} French Land Register data, which excludes lakes, ponds, glaciers > 1 km^{2} (0.386 sq mi or 247 acres) and river estuaries.

Léaz (French pronunciation: [le.a]; Arpitan: Lèya [ˈleː.ja]) is a commune in the Ain department in eastern France.

In addition to the main village, the commune has three hamlets: Grésin, Lavoux and Longeray.

== Population ==
Historical population
Year	Pop.	±% p.a.
1968	405	—
1975	480	+2.46%
1982	482	+0.06%
1990	461	−0.56%
1999	481	+0.47%
2007	511	+0.76%
2012	614	+3.74%
2017	739	+3.78%
2023	912	+3.57%
Source: INSEE

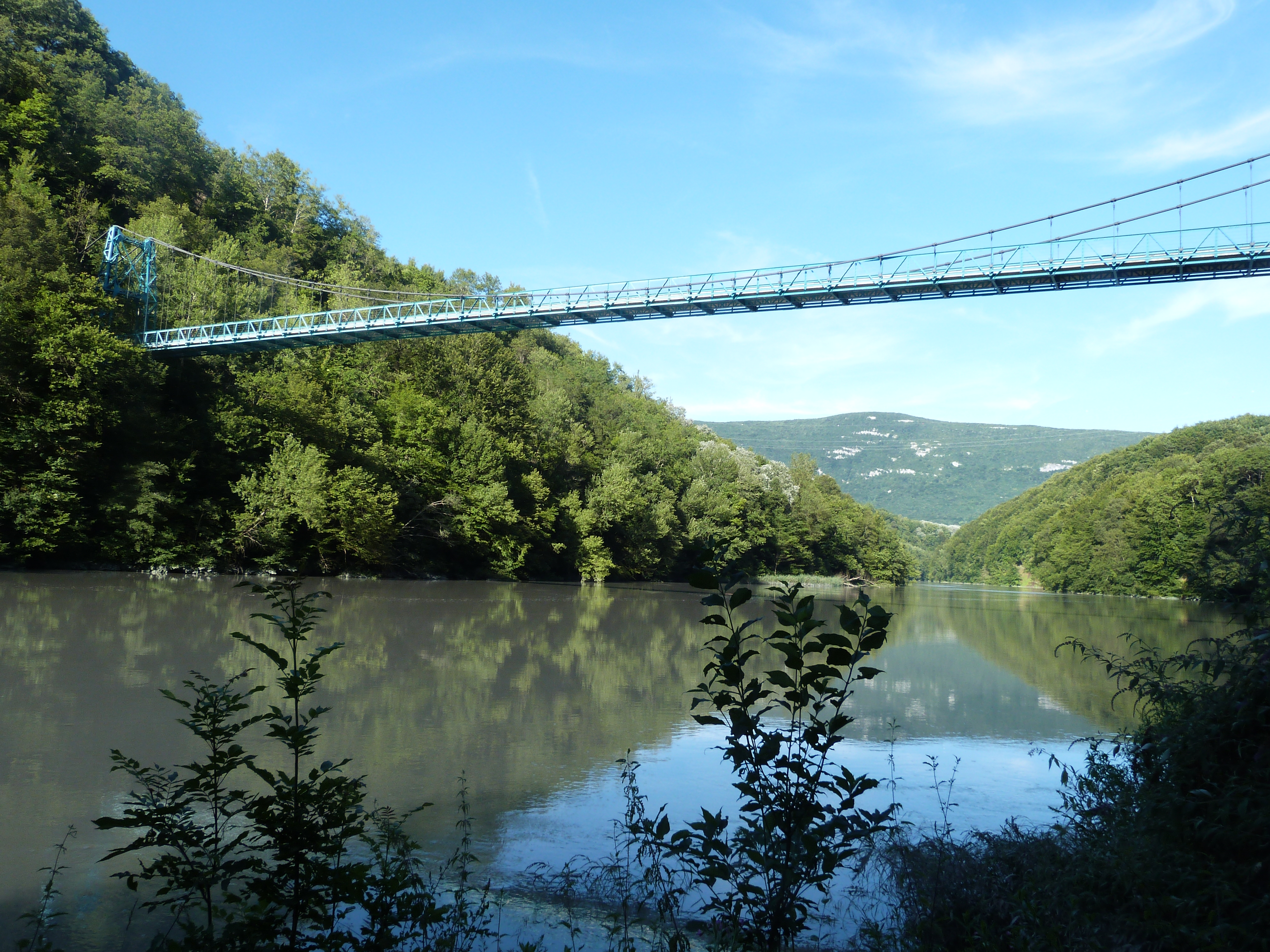
Grésin Bridge

== See also ==
- Communes of the Ain department
