= Versonnex, Ain =

Commune in Auvergne-Rhône-Alpes, France

Versonnex Vèrzenèx (Arpitan)
- Commune
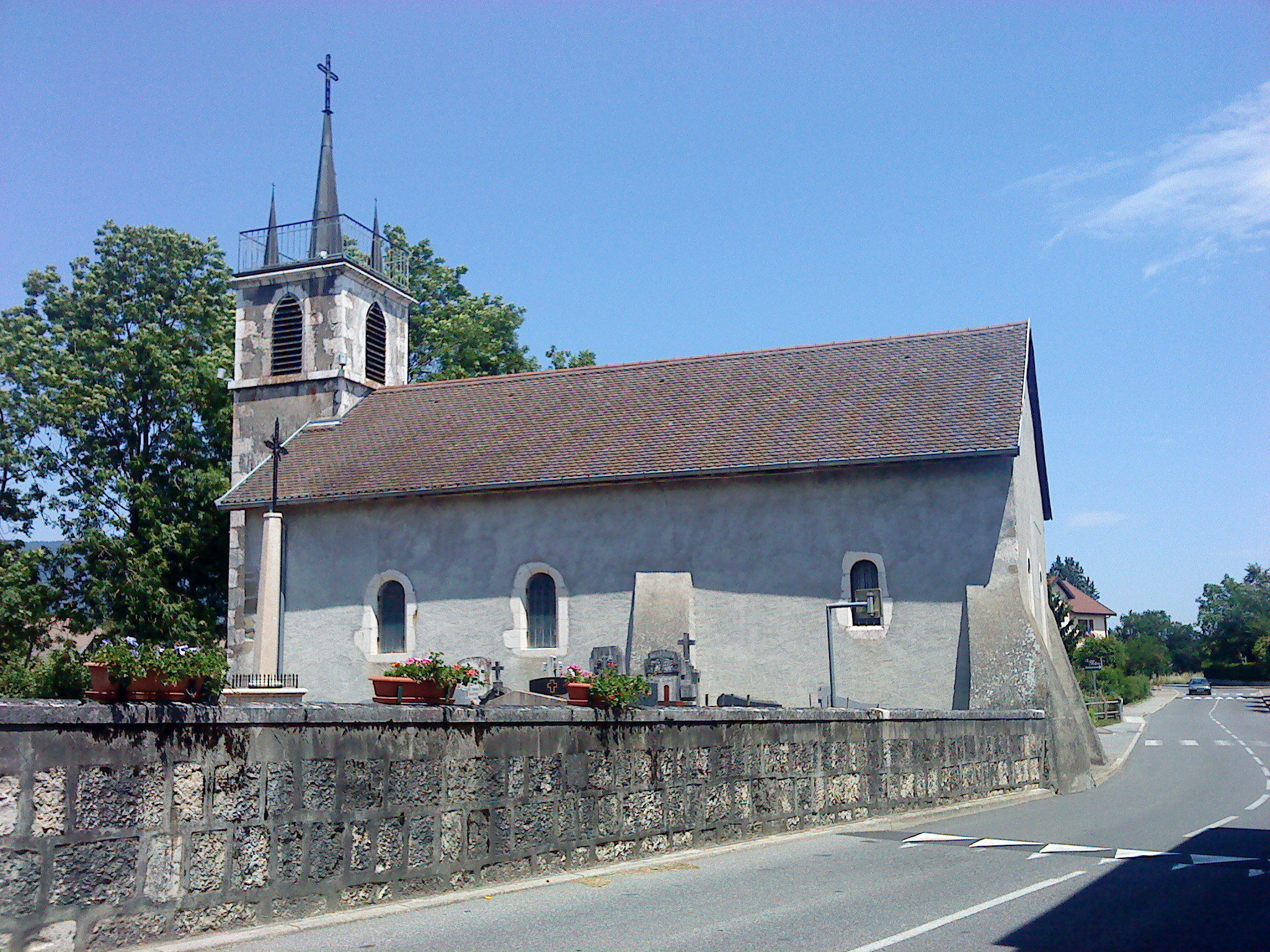
- Church of Saint Martin

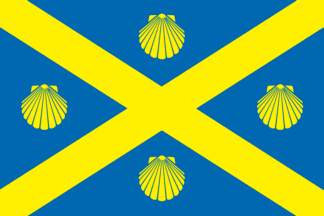
- Flag Coat of arms
- Location of Versonnex
- Location within France Location within Auvergne-Rhône-Alpes
- Coordinates: 46°18′11″N 6°05′52″E
- Country: France
- Region: Auvergne-Rhône-Alpes
- Department: Ain
- Arrondissement: Gex
- Canton: Gex
- Intercommunality: CA Pays de Gex

Government
  - Mayor (2026–32): Pierre Mader
- Area^{1}: 5.89 km^{2} (2.27 sq mi)
- Elevation: 465 m (1,526 ft)
- Highest elevation: 506 m (1,660 ft)
- Lowest elevation: 439 m (1,440 ft)
- Population (2023): 2,182
  - Density: 370/km^{2} (959/sq mi)
- Time zone: UTC+01:00 (CET)
  - Summer (DST): UTC+02:00 (CEST)
- INSEE/Postal code: 01435 /01210
- ^{1} French Land Register data, which excludes lakes, ponds, glaciers > 1 km^{2} (0.386 sq mi or 247 acres) and river estuaries.

Versonnex (French pronunciation: [vɛʁsɔnɛ]; Arpitan: Vèrzenèx [varz.ˈne]) is a commune in the Ain department in eastern France.

== Population ==
Historical population

Year	Pop.	±% p.a.
1793	224	—
1821	263	+0.57%
1846	251	−0.19%
1872	229	−0.35%
1901	186	−0.71%
1921	187	+0.03%
1946	145	−1.01%
1962	180	+1.36%
1968	161	−1.84%

Year	Pop.	±% p.a.
1975	878	+27.42%
1982	1,118	+3.51%
1990	1,866	+6.61%
1999	1,712	−0.95%
2007	2,048	+2.27%
2012	2,143	+0.91%
2017	2,176	+0.31%
2023	2,182	+0.05%

Source: EHESS and INSEE (1968-2023)

== See also ==
- Communes of the Ain department
