= Canton of Geneva =

Canton of Switzerland

Canton of Geneva Canton de Genève (French)
- Canton
- Republic and Canton of Geneva; République et canton de Genève (French)
- Flag Coat of arms Brandmark
- Motto: Post Tenebras Lux ("After the darkness, the light")
- Anthem: Cé qu'è lainô ("The one who is up there")
- Interactive map of Canton of Geneva
- Coordinates: 46°2′N 6°7′E
- Country: Switzerland
- Capital: Geneva
- Subdivisions: 45 municipalities

Government
  - President: Nathalie Fontanet
  - Executive: Council of State (7)
  - Legislative: Grand Council (100)

Area
  - Total: 282.49 km^{2} (109.07 sq mi)

Population (December 2020)
  - Total: 506,343
  - Density: 1,792.4/km^{2} (4,642.4/sq mi)

GDP
  - Total: CHF 51.967 billion (2020)
  - Per capita: CHF 102,876 (2020)
- ISO 3166 code: CH-GE
- Highest point: 516 m (1,693 ft): Les Arales
- Lowest point: 332 m (1,089 ft): Rhône at Chancy
- Joined: 1815
- Languages: French
- Website: www.ge.ch

The Canton of Geneva, officially the Republic and Canton of Geneva, (Note: French: République et canton de Genève; Arpitan: Rèpublica et canton de Geneva; German: Republik und Kanton Genf; Italian: Repubblica e Cantone di Ginevra; Romansh: Republica e chantun Genevra.) is one of the 26 cantons of the Swiss Confederation. It is composed of forty-five municipalities, and the seat of the government and parliament is in the city of Geneva.

Geneva is the French-speaking westernmost canton of Switzerland. It lies at the western end of Lake Geneva and on both sides of the Rhone, its main river. Within the country, the canton borders Vaud to the east, the only adjacent canton. However, most of Geneva's border is with France, specifically the region of Auvergne-Rhône-Alpes. As is the case in several other Swiss cantons (Ticino, Neuchâtel, and Jura), Geneva is referred to as a republic within the Swiss Confederation.

One of the most populated cantons, Geneva is considered one of the most cosmopolitan regions of the country. As a center of the Calvinist Reformation, the city of Geneva has had a great influence on the canton, which essentially consists of the city and its suburbs. Notable institutions of international importance based in the canton are the United Nations, the International Committee of the Red Cross and CERN.

== History ==
The Canton of Geneva, whose official name is the Republic and Canton of Geneva, is the successor of the Republic of Geneva.

=== Context ===
Compared to other urban cantons of Switzerland (Zürich, Bern, Basel before it split, Fribourg, Lucerne), Geneva's geographical size is relatively small.

=== Early history ===
Geneva was controlled by the Allobroges, a rich and powerful Celtic tribe until 121 BC, when they were defeated by the Romans. The city was then attached to Gallia Narbonensis province. Its political importance in the region was low, but it soon developed an important economy owing to the city's port that facilitated trade over Lake Geneva from the routes joining from Seyssel and Annecy towards the Roman colonies of Nyon and Avenches. The city remained part of the Empire until 443 when, welcomed by the Romans, the Burgundians settled in an ill-defined region named Sapaudia and Geneva was chosen as the capital of the newly formed kingdom for its first 20 years due to the city's economic importance as well as the prestige of its Bishop. As the kingdom began expanding towards Lyon and Grenoble, Geneva lost its central geographical location of the kingdom and for a time became a secondary capital until the kingdom was divided between Godegisel and Gundobad, sons of Gondioc. Godegisel settled in Geneva from which he controlled the northern bishoprics. The nature of the political relationship between both brothers is not well known, but in the year 500 the kingdoms went to war, during which Godegisel was defeated and Geneva pillaged and destroyed.

In 532, the Burgundians were conquered by the Franks, who administratively divide the area in three parts: one centred on the city of Besançon, one around Dijon, and the last one, the Pagus Ultraioranus ("Transjurane") includes the cities of Geneva, Nyon, Sion, and Avenches. Given the peripheral location of Geneva within this region, it lost its status of capital, although it kept a certain religious prestige. In 864, Conrad II acquired the title of Duke of Transjurane and in 888 his son Rudolph I becomes king of the second kingdom of Burgundy after seizing the opportunity of death of Charles the Fat. At its maximum extent around the year 1000, the new kingdom extends from Provence to Basel and controls the main alpine passes of the region. In this context, Geneva regains its importance as the city was located in the intersection between several important roads connecting Italy to Northern Europe via the western Alps mountain passes of Mont Cenis and Great St Bernard Pass.

=== Counts of Geneva (11th–15th centuries) ===
However, by the end of the 10th century the kingdom was engulfed in several conflicts between the king's power and the aristocracy. Notably for Geneva, some of the most important nobles began to offer some lands to the Church, such as in 912 when Eldegarde (probably a Countess in an area near Nyon) gave up her lands in the area of Satigny which eventually became the Mandement, or in 962 when Queen Berthe offered lands in Saint-Genis. The income of the Kingdom suffered from these transfers of lands and, in an attempt to stop the process, in 995 King Rudolph III tried to withdraw the hereditary rights away from some of his nobles. However, the King was defeated in this power struggle, and this led to a weakening of the central power. As the King weakened, some of his local officers such as the Counts rejected his authority and even opposed him. Several independent fiefdoms emerge from this time, including the County of Geneva.

In 1032, Rudolph III died without an heir. The Kingdom of Burgundy then reverted to HRE Conrad II, who tried to re-assert control of the lands by rallying the nobles who opposed Rodolph III. In exchange for his loyalty, Gerold, count of Geneva, obtained full powers over his County, becoming a direct vassal of the Emperor and so his lands became part of the Holy Roman Empire.

However, it is not clear how the power over the city proper was shared between the Prince-Bishopric of Geneva and the counts. Thus, a power struggle between both ensued in which the counts received the support from the canons of the chapter, a large majority of whom were members of vassal families of the count. The apex of the count's power took place from 1078 to 1129, when Count Aymon I managed to get his brother Guy de Faucigny appointed as bishop of Geneva. Aymon took advantage of this situation by transferring the administration of some of the lands away from the Diocese of Geneva to the priory of Saint-Victor of which he became protector at the request of the Bishop, and siphoned the resources of the priory to himself.

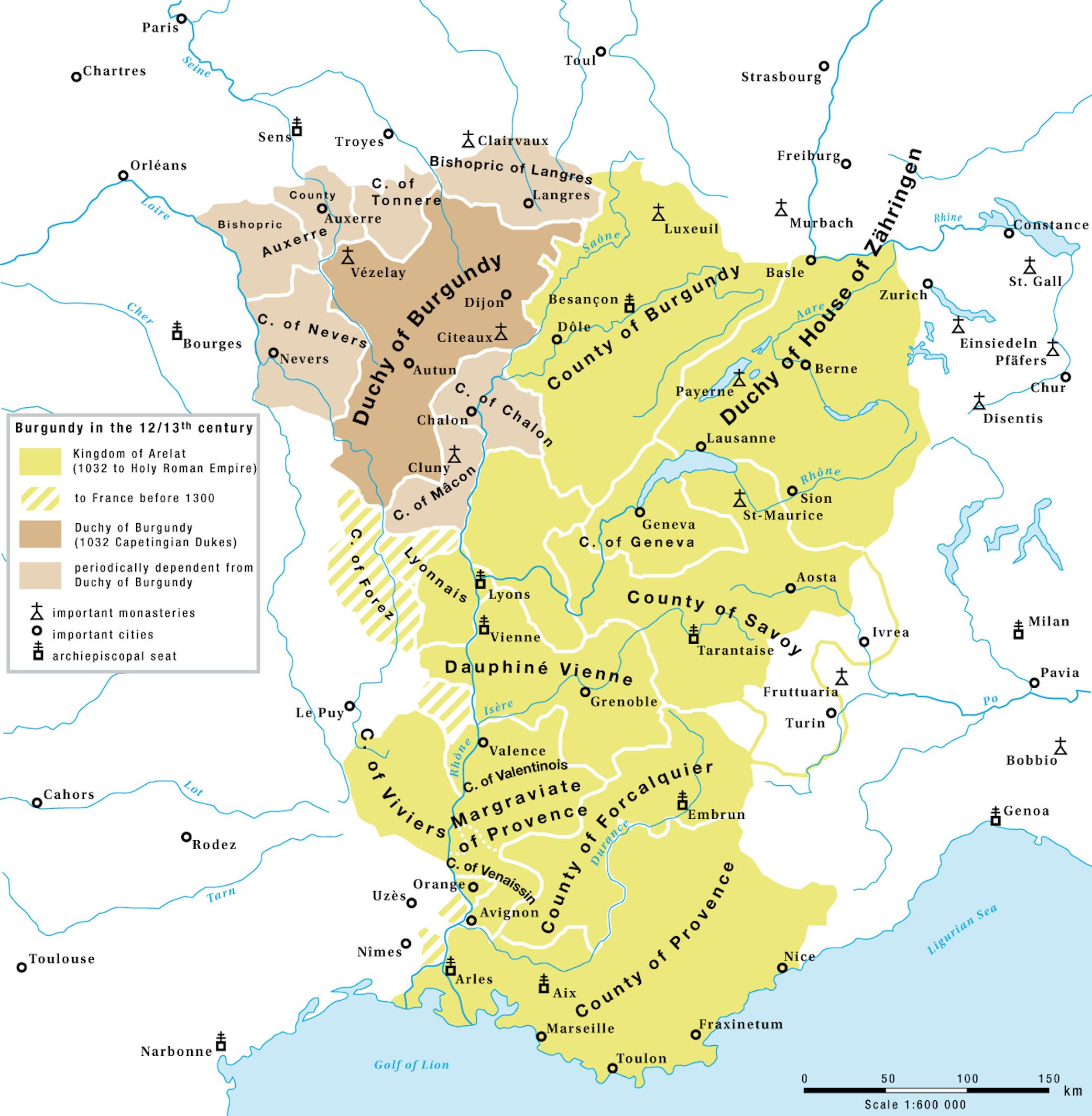
The County of Geneva and surrounding territories in around 1200.

The successor of Guy de Faucigny, Bishop Humbert de Grammont, was outraged by this situation, and requested the restitution of the churches transferred to the administration of the Count. The outcome of the Gregorian Reform materialised in the council of Vienne of 1124 which legislated on securing the ecclesiastical rights and possessions of the church. Pope Callixtus II then pressured Aymon to return the Church's estates, going as far as excommunicating him. The Count repented, and greeted the Bishop on the border of his County in Seyssel as the Bishop was on his way back to Geneva from Vienne, whose Bishop had been tasked by the Pope to mediate in the conflict. There, they concluded a treaty (the Traité de Seyssel), whereby the Count restored to the Bishop of Geneva some of the churches whose rights and revenues he had acquired.

Although this treaty did not fully solve the conflict, which was only fully resolved by the treaty of Saint-Sigismond in 1156 which confirmed all the provisions, it marked an important step for Geneva as the count also gave up his temporal rights over the City of Geneva to the Bishop, except for the right to execute criminal sentences. The following bishops, Arducius de Faucigny (1135-1185) and Nantelme (1185-1205) kept eroding the counts' power. The touchstone of this erosion of power was the acquisition of the Imperial immediacy by the Prince-Bishopric in 1154, which designated the Bishop of Geneva as a Prince of the Empire and, by right, the only lord of the city after the Emperor, a status employed several times by the Bishops in the defence of their independence from local rulers. As a result, some time around 1219 the Counts of Geneva completely quit the city and moved their capital to Annecy, which marked an important step for the future evolution of the canton of Geneva, as for the first time there was a complete separation of the ruling of the city of Geneva, by the Bishops, from the ruling of its hinterlands, the Counts.

At the same time, the county was in a continuous power struggle with the House of Savoy, which by the middle of the 12th century governed a vast principality centred on the control of the main mountain passes of the western Alps. By the beginning of the 13th century, the Counts of Geneva were facing an alliance of the Maison de Faucigny, de Gex, as well as the counts of Savoy. After several decades of wars of the gebenno-faucigneran conflict of 1205–1250, the counts of Geneva lost all their main lands and fortresses. In the Treaty of Paris (1355), Savoy was awarded the Faucigny and Gex, leaving the counts of Geneva as secondary regional actors. After the death of antipope count Robert in 1394, the county passed to the house of Thoire-Villars, who were related to the house of Geneva. However, some of the local nobility was displeased with the outcome and, profiting from the situation, the County of Geneva finally disappeared when it was sold to Amadeus VIII of Savoy for 45,000 gold francs on 5 August 1401.

=== House of Savoy (15th century – 1534) ===
The economic rise of cities and international commerce from the 11th century onwards also affected Geneva. Medieval fairs appeared in Northern Europe, often driven by a political will to promote a city. In contrast, the origins of the trade fairs in the city, active from at least by the middle of the 13th century, remain unknown. However, these expanded greatly during the 14th century and their apogee took place in the middle of the 15th century, when the city counted seven yearly trade fairs, four of which had large international significance: the Epiphany, Easter, August, and October/November. Geneva benefited from several external factors at this time to explain this economic expansion: the crisis of trade fairs in Chalon-sur-Saône, and the Hundred Years' War, partially removed France from international routes linking Northern Europe to Mediterranean ports such as Montpellier and Marseille, which shifted eastwards, crossing Geneva and the Rhone valley; the city reaped the benefits from the pax sabauda, a long-period of peace during which it was spared from the effects of wars; and in addition, the House of Savoy spent long periods of time in the city, adding to the demand for luxury goods. The trade fairs required credit to function through letters of credit, the development of which adds to the economic expansion of the city. The fairs were also the spark that started Geneva's alliance with the cities of Fribourg and Bern, both of whom had large textile sectors that used the fairs.

This economic development and the centuries-long peace enjoyed by the city is reflected on its demographic expansion. The city grew from about 2,000 inhabitants by the end of the Black Death, to 11,000 by the middle of the 15th century, making it the largest city in the region as Chambéry and Lausanne counted 5,000 inhabitants at the time and in modern Switzerland only Basel with its 8,000-to- 10,000 came close to Geneva's size.

This explains the interest that the Dukes of Savoy took again to gain control of the city over the Bishops of Geneva upon their acquisition of the title of Counts of Geneva. On two occasions, in 1407 and again in 1420, Amadeus VIII, attempted to gain control of the city from the Bishops by pleading to the Pope. However, both times his requests were rejected. Possibly from the lack of interest by the local population who saw no benefit in replacing the Bishop's control with the Duke, since the Bishop shared his ruling of the city with local civilian authorities. In 1434, however, the Duke abdicated and retreated to a chapel. This added to his prestige as a wise ruler, and he managed to get elected as antipope Felix V in 1439. When Bishop François de Metz died in 1444, Amadeus, now anti-pope, became the administrator of the bishopric and became de facto, but not de jure, ruler of the city. When he finally renounced his position as Pope, he kept a degree of control over the city, and succeeded in agreeing with Pope Nicholas V that the future Bishops of Geneva must be designated by the house of Savoy, but without gaining full control over the city.

Nevertheless, larger events began to catch up with the city. In 1462, Louis XI, king of France, decided to forbid Frenchmen and foreigners in his kingdom from attending Geneva's trade fairs, and promoted its most direct competition in Lyon, whose trade fairs began in 1420. This led to an economic decline of the city, which received support from its trade partners, Bern and Fribourg, in view of defending the city's interests in the French court. Trade with the central cities of the Swiss confederation sparked an economic recovery from 1480 to 1520, but it also showed the decline of Savoy as the protector of Geneva. In addition, in the Battle of Nancy during the Burgundian Wars, the Old Swiss Confederacy achieved a decisive military victory against Charles the Bold who died in the battle. Geneva was on the losing side since its Bishop, Jean-Louis de Savoie, had sided with Burgundy following directions from Yolande of Valois, regent of Savoy. Immediately, the confederate troops invaded Vaud, and Bernese troops threatened to conquer Geneva, which, owing to its status as a protected enclave within Savoy, had no standing army of its own. The treaty of Morges in 1477 put a stop to the troops advance in exchange for a ransom of 28,000 écus of Savoy.

The Duchy recovered most of its possessions lost to Bern in exchange for payments, but this period marked the beginning of the end of its hegemony over the Genevan region and the start of an unstable time for the city. The right to appoint the Bishop of Geneva granted to Amadeus III was eroded and it became a political and diplomatic negotiation, between Savoy, the Swiss, the chapel of the cathedral, and the civil authorities of the city. The decline of the Duchy was exacerbated by the internal rebellions and the series of weak and physically ill Dukes. Sensing this weakness, the Duchy's neighbours made it into a prey, incapable as well of defending Geneva's economic interests against French interference as well as incapable of physically protecting the city against foreign invasions. With this loss of reputation, new factions emerge in the city seeking to distance the city from the Duchy.

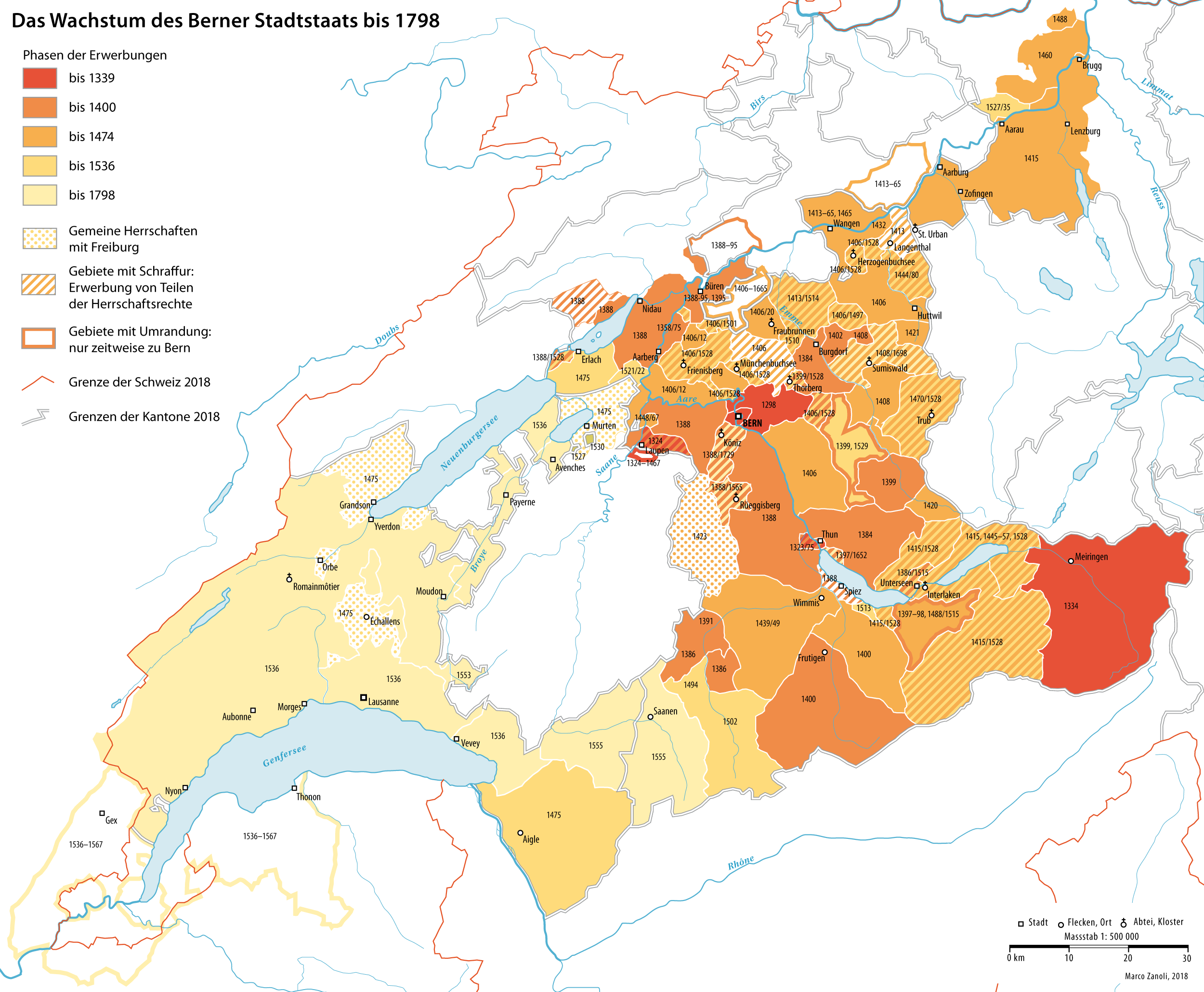
Territories acquired by Bern from Savoie, 1339-1798

The degradation of the political relations between Savoy and the civil authorities of Geneva rose to prominence in 1513, when upon the death of Bishop Charles de Seyssel, Charles III maneuvred to get Jean de Savoie appointed by the Pope. Several Genevan citizens who disapproved the influence of the Duke, led by Besançon Hugues and Philibert Berthelier, form the faction of the Eidguenots (named after the German Eidgenossen, "confederates"), and sought the rapprochement of the city with the Swiss confederation. However, part of the Genevan political elite maintained their preference for the precarious political equilibrium with the House of Savoy, partly to stay in good terms with the rulers of all of Geneva's surroundings. As a sign of contempt, the Eidguenots named this faction the Mammelus, after the Mamluks, the slave-soldiers of the sultan in Cairo.

In 1519, the Eidguenots attempted to conclude a treaty of alliance (combourgeoisie) with the Swiss confederation, but this was rejected by all the cantons except for Fribourg. Bern in particular was an ally of Savoy at this time, and central Swiss cantons viewed with suspicion an eventual expansion to the west. Upon their return to Geneva, Charles II, supported by the Bishop, attempts to destroy this faction and executed several Eidguenots, including Philibert Berthelier in 1519 and Amé Lévrier in 1524, accused of plotting against the Bishop.

The Eidguenots took refuge in Fribourg after the death of Amé Lévrier and, in 1525, successfully negotiated an alliance with the confederates that this time included Bern in addition to Fribourg. The changing attitude of Bern was explained by the decision of the successor of Charles II, Charles III, to side with HRE Charles V in his conflict with Francis I of France, with whom the Swiss had allied themselves and signed the Perpetual Peace after the Battle of Marignano. Upon the return to Geneva of the Eidguenots, the government ratified the treaty of alliance on 25 February 1526, despite the protestations of the Mammelus and Bishop Pierre de la Baume. When the Eidguenots took over the control of the city, they executed the leaders of the opposing faction in retaliation for the previous ruthless behaviour of the Duke. In an attempt to regain his influence, Bishop Pierre de la Baume requested to join the alliance with Bern and Fribourg, which refused. Afraid for his safety, he quit the city on 1 August 1527 and he would only go back for two weeks before permanently leaving Geneva in 1533.

Despite its newly regained independence from the influence of Savoy, Geneva had no real army of its own and remained a city largely dependent on the diplomatic circumstances of the large European powers.

However, the supporters of Charles III did not give up in their quest to seize Geneva. They withdrew to the Pays de Vaud from where they plotted against Geneva under the banner of "Gentilshommes de la Cuiller". Discreetly supported by the Duke, they harassed the city by confiscating food products in its borders, attacking men and ravaging the countryside. After an attempt to assault the city in March 1529 and again in October 1530, Geneva requested the aid of its allies from Bern and Fribourg. Several thousand soldiers, accompanied by negotiators from eight Swiss cantons, entered the city on the 10th of October and stayed for ten days within its walls until the signature of a treaty with Savoy, whereby the Duke abandoned his attacks on the city and re-established the right to trade. Apart from the financial consequences on Geneva, which had to pay for the Swiss soldiers, this intervention left deep marks in the city with consequences for its future.

=== Republic of Geneva (1534/1541–1798, 1813–1815) ===
The Republic of Geneva emerged in 1534 when the city declared the bishopric vacant and assumed full sovereignty, breaking with the Catholic Church and the Duchy of Savoy. In May 1536 the General Council formally adopted the Protestant Reformation, confiscating church property and aligning the city with Bern. John Calvin, persuaded to remain in Geneva by Guillaume Farel, returned in 1541 to introduce the Ecclesiastical Ordinances and later the Civil Edicts, which together structured both church and state until the late 18th century.

Under Calvin, Geneva became a major center of the Reformation, attracting thousands of Protestant refugees and developing important industries such as printing, textiles, and later watchmaking. The city’s independence was repeatedly threatened by Savoy, culminating in the failed assault known as the Escalade in 1602. The subsequent Treaty of Saint-Julien (1603) secured Geneva’s sovereignty, aided by its alliances with Zürich, Bern, and France.

During the 17th and 18th centuries Geneva prospered as a fortified "Protestant Rome" and later as a wealthy trading and manufacturing hub. However, internal tensions grew between the ruling patrician elite and disenfranchised residents, leading to unrest such as the failed revolution of 1782. Economic crisis in the 1780s and the influence of the French Revolution further destabilized the republic.

In April 1798, under pressure from France, the government requested annexation, and Geneva became the capital of the French département of Léman. French rule lasted until 1813, when the Republic was briefly restored before Geneva joined the Swiss Confederation in 1815.

=== Modern history ===
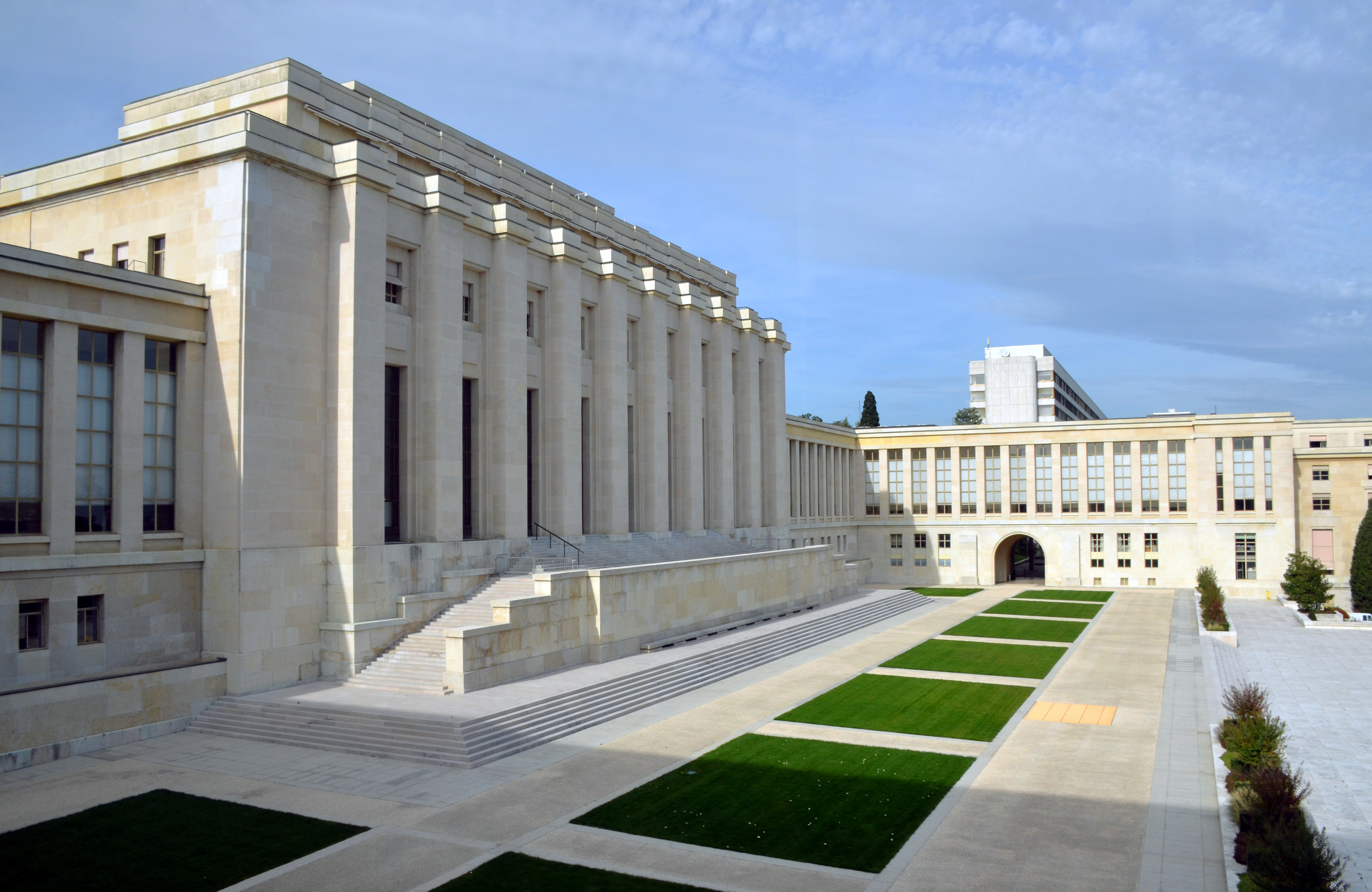
Main building of the Palace of Nations

The canton's fortunes would improve from 1919 when Geneva was chosen as the headquarters of the League of Nations. This led to large construction works to host the organization, including the Palace of Nations completed in 1938. After the dissolution of the organization, the new United Nations headquarters could not be located in Geneva since the new organization was to be designed with a security council capable of leading military operations, which was incompatible with the principle of Swiss neutrality. Instead, in 1946 an agreement was reached to locate the second headquarters of the organization in Geneva, including the headquarters for its largest organisations such as the International Labour Organization (established in Geneva in 1919), the World Health Organization, the International Telecommunication Union, and the General Agreement on Tariffs and Trade (precursor to the World Trade Organization) (1948), and the World Meteorological Organization (1955) and the World Intellectual Property Organization (1967). The decision was aided by the good condition of the infrastructure left by the League of Nations, and Geneva's airport paved and intact runway (the only one in Switzerland at the time) in a European continent ravaged by the second world war.

Geneva Airport in 1968. Its runway is still today the longest of its kind in Switzerland.

This had a profound impact on the local economy, as the connectivity of its airport was boosted by the UN since the organization holds the majority of its conferences in the city. At a time when cross-continental communication was more difficult than today, Geneva became a world center for negotiations and dealmaking thanks to its international status, its resilient telephone network, its international airport, and the convertibility of the Swiss franc. This led to the birth of the large commodity trading sector, starting with the arrival of Cargill's European headquarters in 1956, and the rapid expansion of its already existing large private banking sector, amongst other service-based industries which now power the majority of the local economy alongside the traditional watchmaking industry.

Cross border cooperation began only a century after the creation of the canton. In 1913, an agreement was sealed between Switzerland and France to build the Chancy-Pougny electric dam. Completed in 1925 to supply energy to the steel mills in Creusot, it began to supply electricity to the Services Industriels de Genève by 1958.

Cross-border working movements had existed in Geneva since the Middle Ages and the city was traditionally more open to immigration than others. Around the year 1700, Swiss cities and their allies such as Geneva, had two types of residents: the bourgeois, who held political rights (and a minority of whom formed the patrician class), and the inhabitants, who had no say in the ruling of the city. Amongst the latter, there were the 'established', who had full residence permits, and the 'tolerated' with time-limited permits. The proportion of bourgeois over the total residents in Basle was 70% in 1795; 61% in Zürich in 1780, and 26% in Geneva in 1781. The proportion of 'inhabitants' in Zürich in 1795 was of 8%, whereas in Geneva, a more liberal city, it was 46% in 1764. Note that the remaining residents were 'foreigners', people from other villages and cities.

Building on the liberal roots, in 1882 a convention allowed French citizens a certain degree of freedom to work in Switzerland and vice versa. However, the 1950s and 1960s were years of very high economic growth in Geneva. This led to an increasing need to employ workers from across the border, from Pays de Gex and the Haute-Savoie - from 6,750 workers in 1966 to 22,500 in 1972. Since Geneva refused to participate in the Franco-Swiss agreements for the distribution of income taxes levied on cross border workers of 1935 and 1966 that covered all the other cantons, the municipalities from the neighbouring French regions were increasingly suffocated by the need to finance public equipment for a population that did not financially contribute to the budgets. This situation led to a first grouping of municipalities to defend their interests, the “Association de Communes Frontalières”. Acknowledging the problem, Geneva agreed in 1973 to transfer 3.5% of the gross income of those workers directly to the French municipalities, equivalent to around CHF330 million/year nowadays.

Cooperation increased following the 1980 Madrid accords on the Outline Convention on Transfrontier Co-operation. However, it was the 2002 agreement on the free movement of people between the European Union and Switzerland that had a bigger impact on Geneva's economy and society. The number of cross-border workers increased from 35,000 in 2002 to 92,000 in 2020. This vastly increased the need for cooperation, notably in transportation. It led to the creation of the “Agglomeration Franco-Valdo-Genevoise”, later renamed “Grand Genève“ in 2012, which roughly corresponds in geographical extension to the 1-million inhabitants metropolitan area of Geneva extending beyond the cantonal borders across Vaud, Ain, and Haute-Savoie. Its major achievements include the push towards the construction and operation of the Léman Express rail network and the projected extensions of the tpg tram network to Annemasse, St-Julien-en-Genevois, and Ferney-Voltaire.

==== Modern economic history ====
Geographically, the city and canton had been advantaged in the Middle Ages by its position as a crossroads between France, Savoy and Italy with Northern Europe, via the mountain passes and Lake Geneva. However, this advantage evaporated with the construction of the railways. The first railway to link the city, built by the Paris-Lyon-Méditerranée (PLM) linked Geneva to Lyon in 1858, followed soon after during the same year by the Geneva to Lausanne railway line operated by the West Switzerland Company. This provided a basic link between France (Lyon) and Switzerland (Lausanne), but in order to complete the role of a crossroad the network required a north-south connection, linking Annecy to Geneva.

The Victor Emmanuel Railway showed interest in this link. Camillo Benso, prime minister of the Sardinian government, claimed that if the railways did not penetrate the Faucigny and Chablais, those territories "will be more detached from the rest of Savoy than Sardinia is from the rest of the continental provinces [of Italy]. Allowing this separation would be equivalent to abandoning those two good provinces to Switzerland". However only a few kilometres of the line from Annecy would ever be built before the project was abandoned due to Savoy's annexation by France in 1860. After the annexation, France prioritised the connection of its new provinces to the rest of the country with rail and quickly granted a concession to PLM to build a link between Fort l'Écluse on the Lyon-Geneva line to Annemasse and from there to Thonon-les-Bains and Faucigny. This project was opposed by Geneva since the link would avoid crossing the canton. The Swiss government elaborated an alternative treaty in 1869 giving France five years to build the Annecy-Annemasse-Eaux-Vives-Geneva line, and tasking Switzerland with completing the Annemasse-Geneva section. This would give Geneva a pivotal role in becoming the crossroads between Lyon, the Chablais, and Faucigny. Although initially the French government showed willingness to allow the construction of both options, the Franco-Prussian War put a stop to many projects, and only the Fort l'Écluse to Annemasse section would finally be completed.

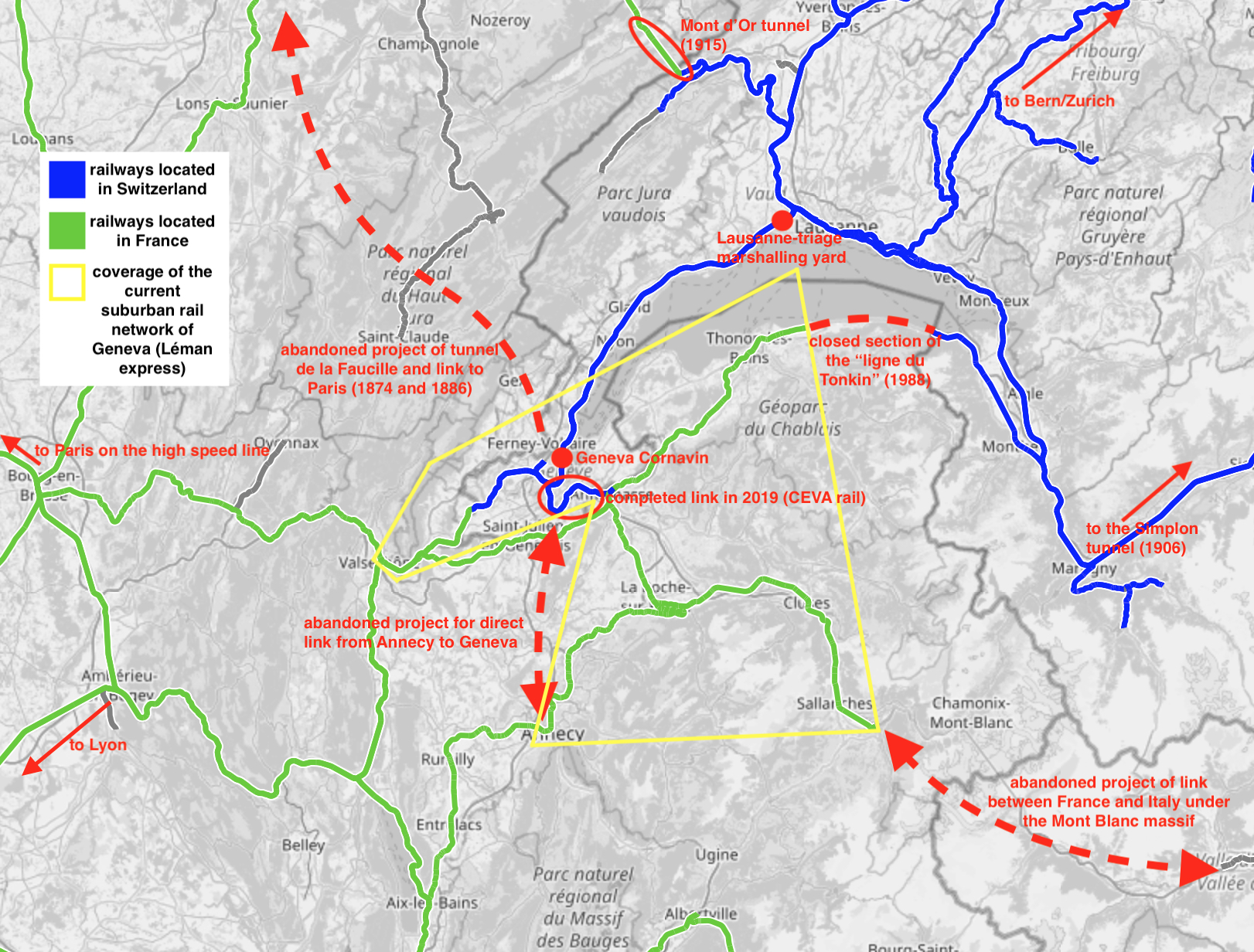
Map showing the current railway system around Geneva as well as the past projects in the region

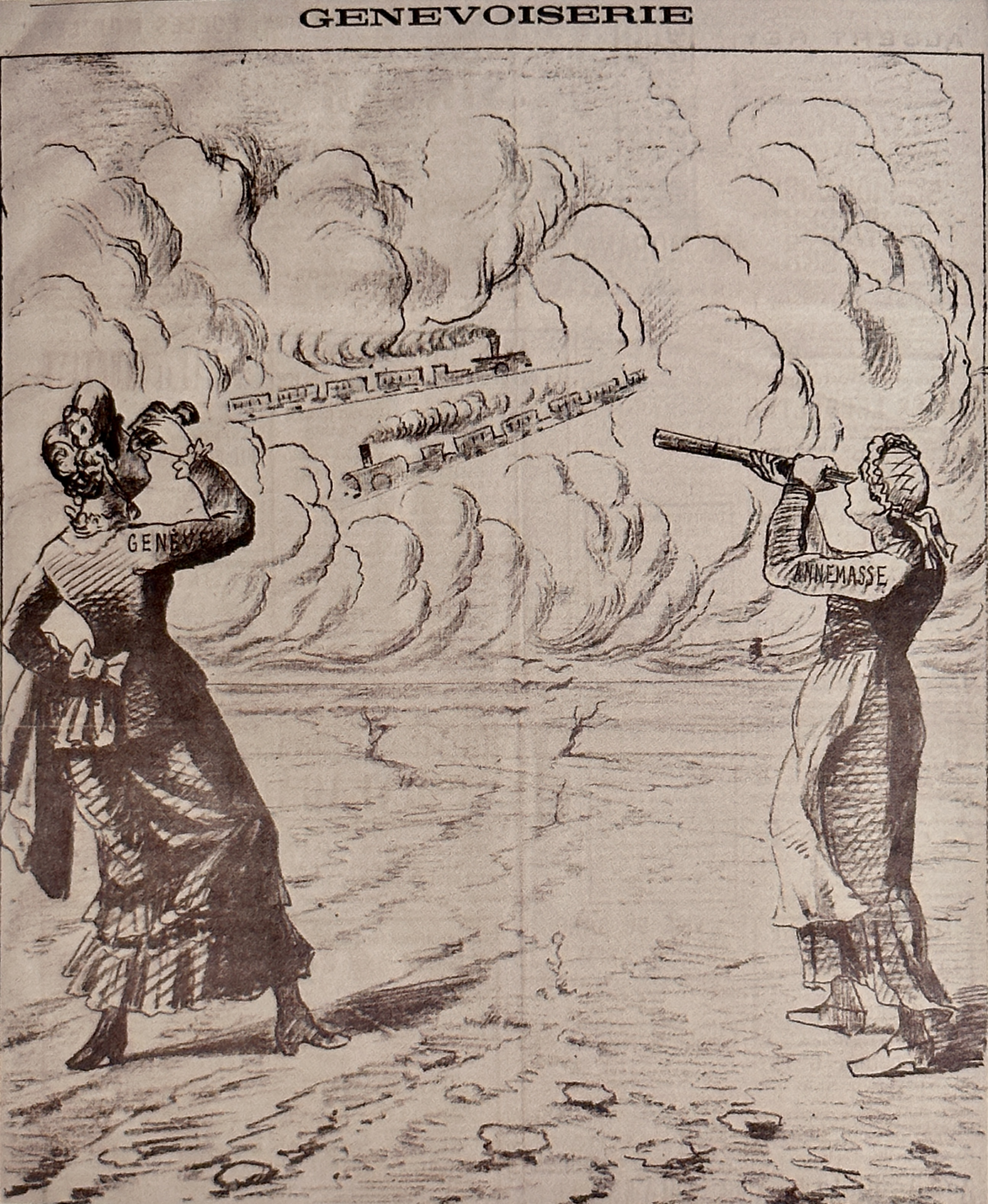
the lack of connection between Annemasse and Geneva was a topic of alarm already in the 19th century. The original citation read: "elegant Geneva and the Savoyard maid examine in the shrouded horizon the railway connection between Geneva and Savoy... Geneva... Anne!... Anne... sister Anne!... do you see anything coming?"

Another missed opportunity for Geneva to keep its central position came with the Simplon tunnel. Geneva had entertained the idea to build a tunnel through the Col de la Faucille in Gex, linking the canton to Saint-Jean-de-Losne in Burgundy on the Paris-Lyon axis, avoiding Lyon. In 1874 Geneva's government submitted a proposal for this project, complemented in 1886 by the project to link the canton to Gex and Morez and Saint-Julien-en-Genevois and Annecy, which would have transformed the city into a real railway hub. The start of the construction of the Simplon tunnel in 1896 encouraged Geneva to push for this project, and suggested again the construction of a tunnel under the Col de la Faucille to provide a shorter connection between France and Italy than the existing links via the Fréjus tunnel and the Gotthard tunnel. Both France and other western cantons showed great interest in the idea. Alas, the PLM chose instead a route via the tunnel of Mont d'Or to link France to the Simplon tunnel via Lausanne and the Rhône valley in Valais, inaugurated in 1915. The hopes for a railway tunnel under Mont Blanc, which would have led to an increase in rail traffic through Geneva, were also stopped by the commencement of World War I, and by the time that this tunnel was finally completed after the second world war, it had turned into a road tunnel instead.

A small stretch of railway was built between Annemasse and Eaux-Vives, but this station would be left unconnected to the rest of the Swiss network despite the agreement by the Swiss confederation to complete the missing link between that station and Geneva's central station in Cornavin in 1912. Although the link between Cornavin and Eaux-Vives was finally completed in 2019, leading to the creation of the Léman Express suburban rail network, it is not intended for freight transport. Additionally, the south line between Annemasse and Valais that provided a shorter path to the Simplon tunnel from Geneva (the ‘Tonkin line’), was eventually closed between Evian-les-Bains and Saint-Gingolph to passenger traffic in 1937 and to all traffic in 1988.

As a consequence of all these decisions, although freight traffic exists towards the industrial areas of La Praille, Vernier, and Meyrin, the main marshalling yard serving the city, Lausanne-Triage is located near Morges, 50 km away from Geneva and the city never redeveloped its importance as a traffic gateway to central Europe from the Mediterranean.

Financially, the city bankers had long developed their connections and networks across Europe. In the advent of the industrial revolution the main industry of the city was watchmaking, and it had long prided itself on the craftmanship of its workers. The surplus of the abundant capital was therefore channeled by the local bankers to investments in other cities. Some industries managed to develop on the back of the highly skilled workforce, for example the Société Genevoise d’Instruments de Physique (SIP) established in 1860, which produced electrical equipment, and would eventually merge in 1891 with Cuenod Sautter & Cie in 1891 to form Ateliers Sécheron, which produced electrical equipment and train locomotives. It was acquired by Brown Boveri Company in 1919, and today, as Sécheron Hasler, it still produces complex electrical transformers and other electrical equipment in its factory in Satigny. Chemical companies, namely Firmenich and Givaudan were established in 1895 and 1898.

Despite all these examples, due to the relative isolation of the canton, surrounded by France from 1860 and linked with a small railway network to the rest of the continent, the canton did not manage to industrially develop as quickly as better connected cities such as Zürich, which overtook Geneva as the largest city in Switzerland by population in the late 1860s.

== Coat of arms ==
Official coat of arms of the Canton of Geneva

The elements of its coat of arms are:

- Shield: showing the Imperial Eagle and a Key of St. Peter (symbolizing the status of Geneva as a Free imperial city and as an episcopal seat, respectively), in use since the 15th century
- Crest in the form of half a sun inscribed with ΙΗΣ (for Jesus Hominum Salvator)
- The motto: Post Tenebras Lux

The current coat of arms, adopted from the city of Geneva, represent the union of the semi-eagle originating from the two-headed eagle from the Holy Roman Empire, in which Geneva formed part in the Middle Ages, and the gold key from the coat of arms of the bishopric of Geneva, symbolising the Key of St. Peter, patron saint of the cathedral. The bishop was a direct vassal of the emperor and he exercised in his name the temporal power over the city. Symbolising the union of spiritual and mortal powers, the coat of arms were adopted by the citizens of Geneva in 1387. The old colours of Geneva were grey and black and changed to black and purple in the 17th century. Gold and red began to be used from the 18th century.

The crest with the sun and the ΙΗΣ inscription, denoting the first three letters of the Greek name of Jesus, exists since the 15th century but was used on the coat of arms until the 16th century.

The motto of Geneva, Post tenebras lux, Latin for 'light after darkness', appears in the Vulgate version of Job 17:12. The phrase was adopted as the Calvinist motto later by the entire Protestant Reformation and by Geneva.

== Geography ==
=== Political geography: definition of today's cantonal borders ===
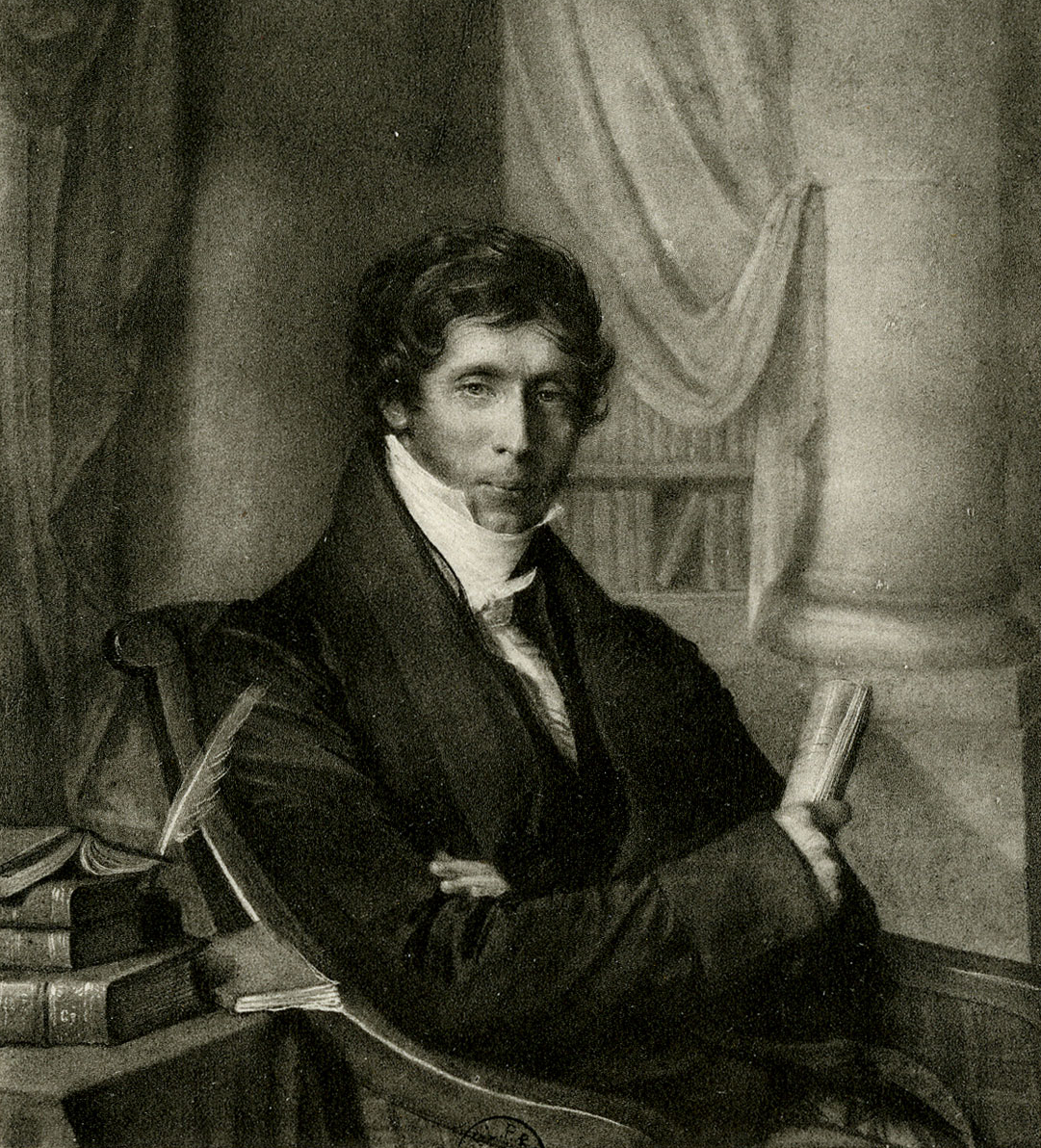
Charles Pictet de Rochemont, the Geneva envoy to the Congress of Vienna who negotiated the canton's borders

Following the events that transformed Switzerland under the Helvetic Republic, Geneva joined the Swiss Confederation in 1815 as the 22nd canton. The territory of the present canton of Geneva was largely established as a result of the Congress of Vienna, in order to provide contiguity between the city of Geneva and its satellite territories established during the previous negotiations with France and Savoy, such as the Mandement, and to physically join the canton to the rest of Switzerland.

During the negotiations, the authorities were split between those who sought to maximise the gain in territory for the new canton at the expense of France and Sardinia, and the conservatives who wanted to minimise the gain in territory to avoid including a large number of Catholics in the new canton. The former were led by Charles Pictet de Rochemont, a Genevan statesmen and diplomat. The conservatives, formed largely of old Genevan aristocracy, were led by Joseph des Arts who in addition preferred to keep Geneva's independence. However, in the end neither side got what they wanted as larger events dominated the situation.

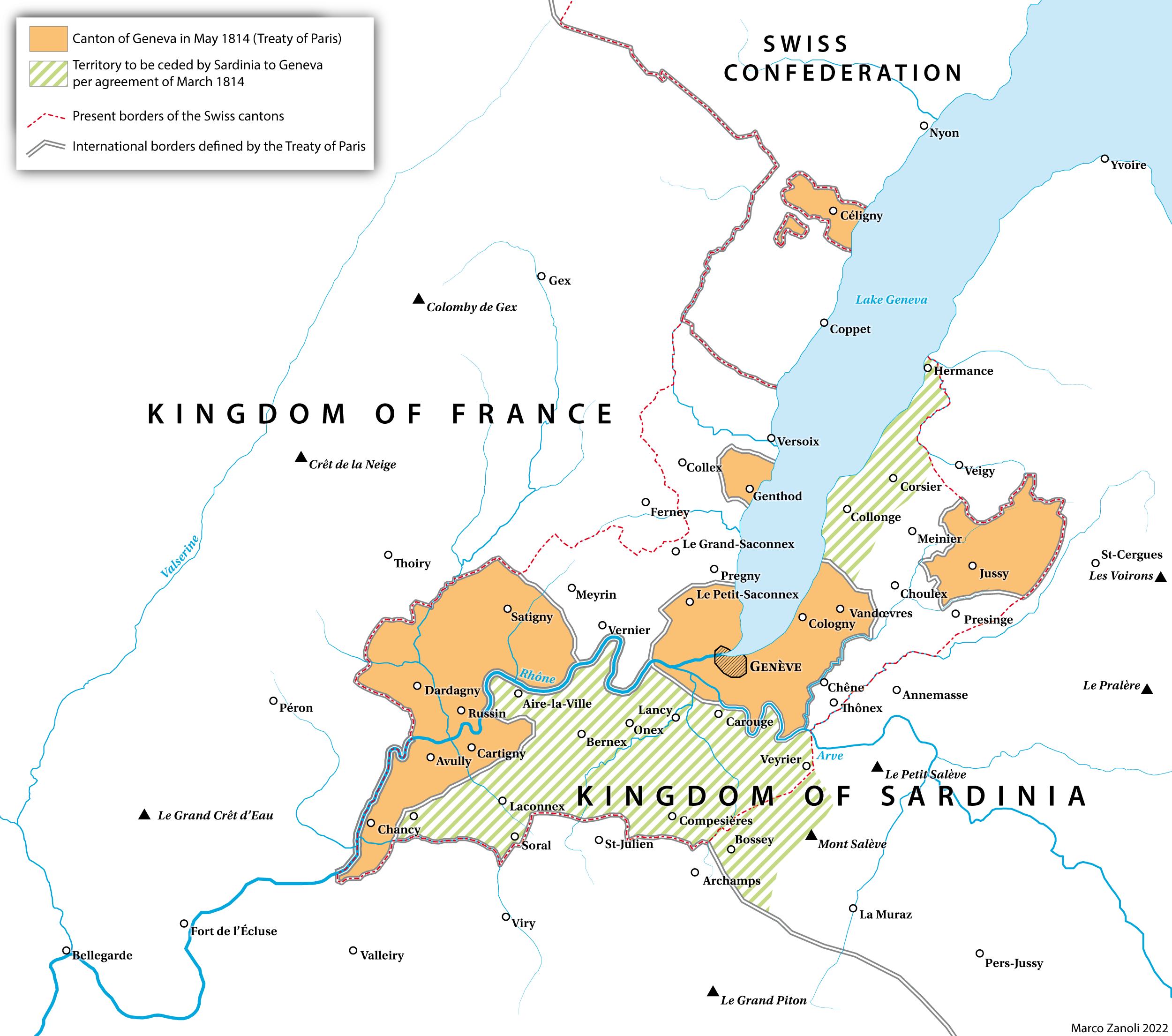
Map of the canton of Geneva after the first peace of Paris May 1814

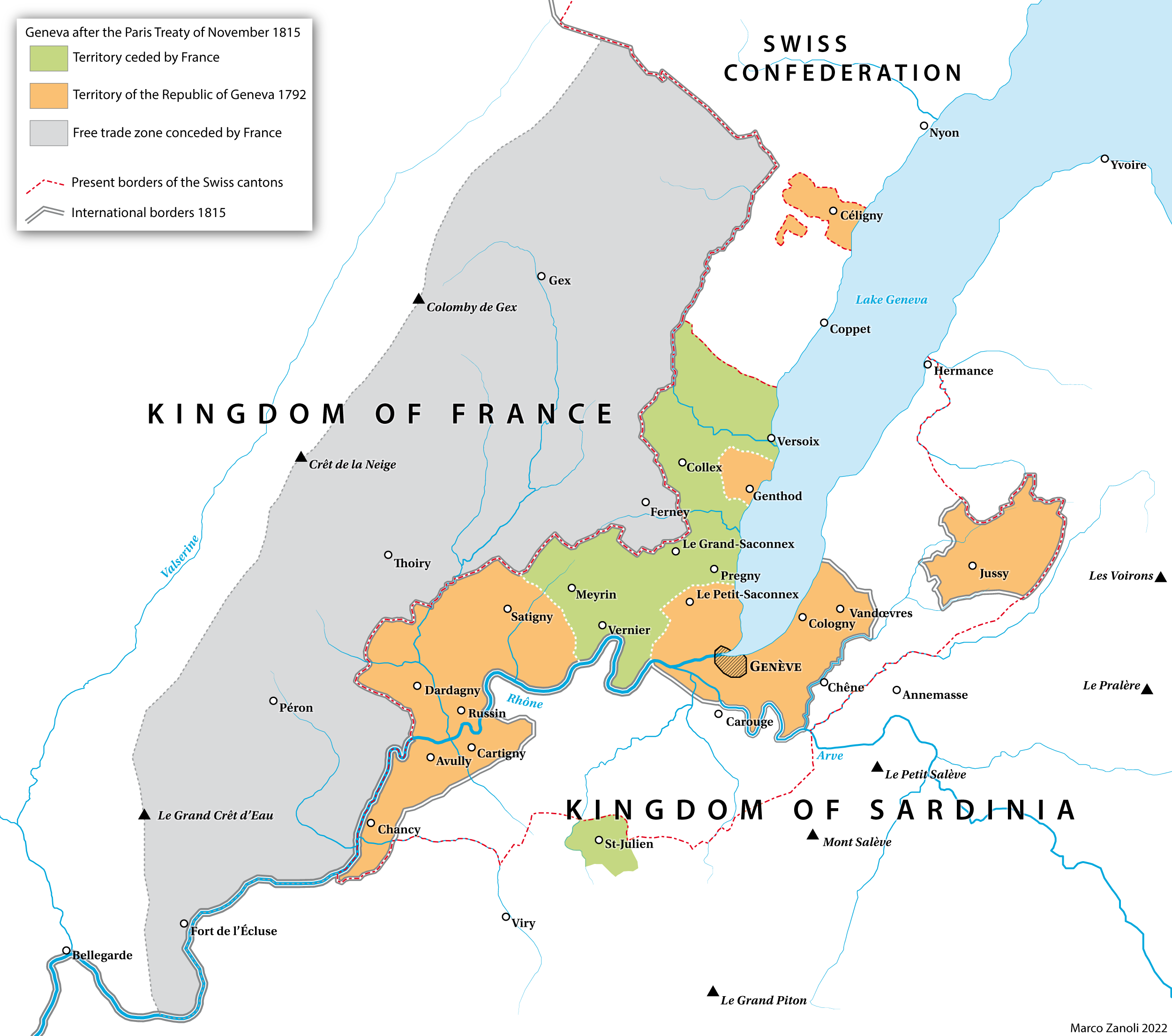
Map of the canton of Geneva after the treaty of Paris 1815

Charles Pictet de Rochemont was tasked with the negotiations with the powers in Paris and later Vienna. In his initial plans presented to the Emperor Alexander I, he suggested a new canton extending from the summits of the Jura surrounding the city (Crêt de la Neige), all the way to mount Salève and les Voirons. This, therefore, included the Pays de Gex and all the lands in the Genevan basin. In part of these negotiations, it was even suggested to transfer the area of Porrentruy to France in exchange for the Pays de Gex. However, Louis XVIII was adamantly opposed to transferring catholic subjects to the "Protestant Rome", so France did not have to cede any territory to Geneva in the Peace of Paris in May 1814. Only after the return of Napoleon and the second Treaty of Paris Geneva could achieve limited territorial gains to link the canton to Vaud and break the isolation of the enclaves in the Mandement. One town in particular, Ferney, continues to act today as a bottleneck in the connection to the rest of the country, as France was emotionally attached to the chosen home of Voltaire and refused to cede it. The negotiations with France were concluded by the Treaty of Paris of 1815, whereby the canton added the current municipalities of Versoix (which provided the geographical link with neighbouring Vaud), Collex-Bossy, Pregny-Chambésy, Vernier, Meyrin and Grand-Saconnex.

In similar negotiations with the Kingdom of Sardinia, Charles Pictet de Rochemont pursued the acquisition of the lands adjoining Geneva and included the slopes of mount Salève. However, Turin opposed this demand as the area contained the important road linking Thonon-les-Bains and the Faucigny with Annecy. In the end, the diplomat managed to swap this demand, as well as a demand for a longer portion of the coastline of the lake, for a large gain in territory from Chancy to Geneva (what is now the Campagne), as well as lands around the mandement of Jussy. These negotiations were concluded by the Treaty of Turin of 1816 with Sardinia, from which the new canton gained the present municipalities of Laconnex, Soral, Perly-Certoux, Plan-les-Ouates, Bernex, Aire-la-Ville, Onex, Confignon, Lancy, Bardonnex, Troinex, Veyrier, Chêne-Thônex, Puplinge, Presinge, Choulex, Meinier, Collonge-Bellerive, Corsier, Hermance, Anières, and Carouge.

In total, the canton added 159 square kilometres of territory, settled with over 16,000 inhabitants, mostly catholic and rural. At the time, the city and its possessions had 29,000 inhabitants.

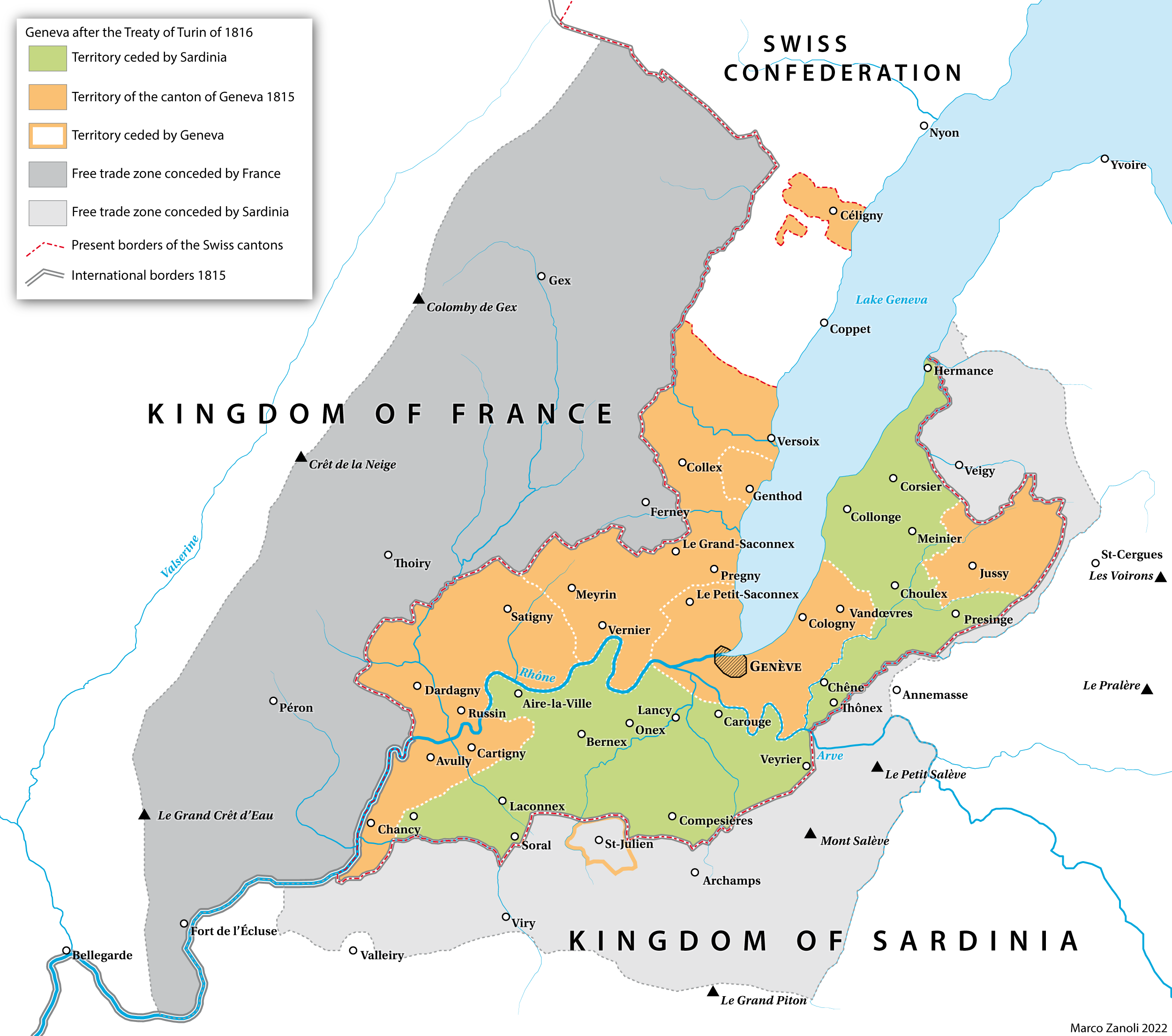
Map of the canton of Geneva after the treaty of Turin 1816

Initially, many of the new villages were grouped together by the Genevan government. For example, the hamlets of Avusy, Soral, and Laconnex formed one single municipality. The same occurred to Bernex, Onex, and Confignon as well as to Plan-les-Ouates, Bardonnex, Perly, and Certoux (the four villages formed 'Compèsieres'). However, the Paris and Turin treaties did not deal with the issue of common land in those villages (nor with the issue of common land that was now separated by international borders). This resulted into tensions as villagers did not want to share their local common land with villagers from the same municipality as the distribution of land and the resulting revenue was highly uneven. A cantonal law from 5 February 1849 required municipal acts be voted by counsellors, and to identify in the minutes the position of each counsellor and the reason for their vote. This increased transparency but it led to tensions related to the placement of schools, townhalls and other public buildings and services in addition to the issue on communal lands. Eventually, these tensions led to the separation of those villages in the second half of the 19th century, which led to the present-day municipal borders for those newly acquired lands.

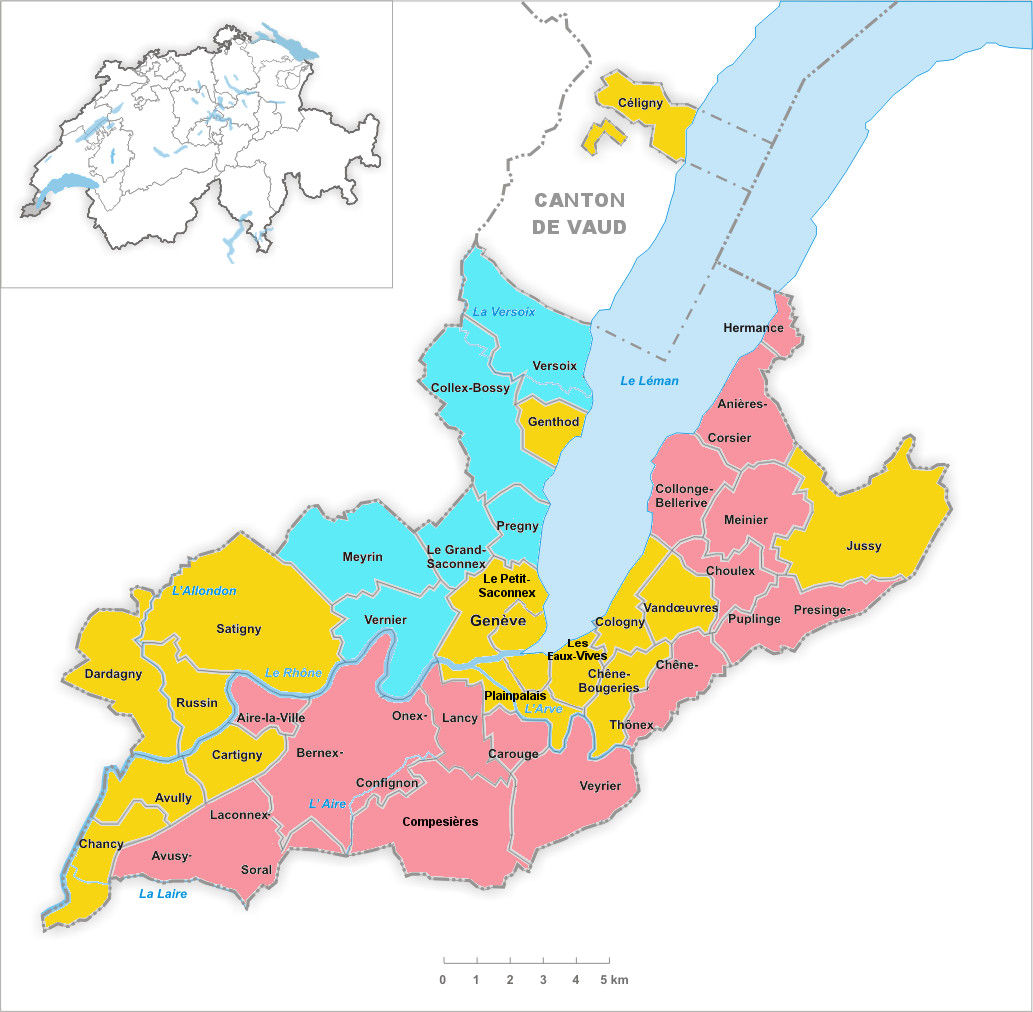
Borders after the Congress of Vienna: in yellow, the previous lands of Geneva; in blue, lands ceded by France; in pink, lands ceded by Savoy.

The last municipal border change occurred in 1931. As a result of a push towards the rationalisation of resources following the 1920s economic crisis, the municipalities that formed the ancient urban part of the Republic of Geneva (Eaux-Vives, le Petit-Saconnex, Plainpalais, and Geneva) merged to form the modern city of Geneva.

In 1956, as a result of the planned expansion of Geneva Airport, both countries agreed to exchange a piece of territory to fit in the new runway, affecting the French municipality of Ferney-Voltaire.

The last change of the canton's borders occurred in 2003, when the construction of the border crossing in the new section of highway linking the Swiss A1 to the French A41 required an exchange of territories. Land was transferred from the municipality of Bardonnex, to St-Julien-en-Genevois. To compensate for the loss of Genevan soil, the municipality of Soral gained territory from Viry and St-Julien.

=== Physical geography ===
Geneva is the canton with the smallest difference between its lowest and highest points, being of only 184 metres. However, it is surrounded across its borders by the numerous mountains of the Jura and Alpine foothills, notably the Crêt de la Neige and its neighbour Le Reculet (the highest, and second-highest peaks of the Jura, respectively), the Salève, the Voirons, and La Dôle (in Vaud territory). The area of the canton of Geneva is 282 square kilometers (108.9 sq mi).

The canton is located in the extreme west of Switzerland. Excluding the exclave of the municipality of Céligny, the canton shares 95% of its border with France: 103 km out a total of 107.5 km, the remaining 4.5 km are shared with Vaud.

Geneva is surrounded by the French departments of the Ain to its west, and that of the Haute Savoie to the East and South, and the canton of Vaud to the north.

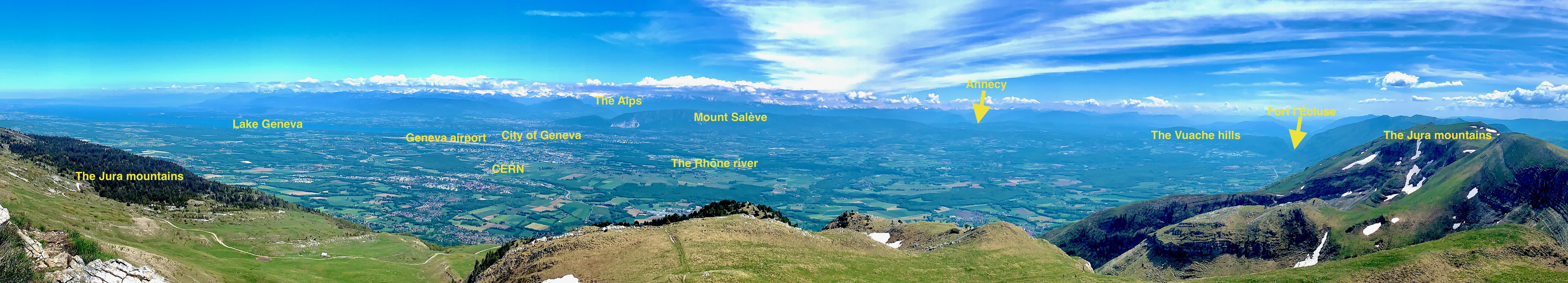
View from Reculet mountain towards Geneva. The canton occupies most of the Geneva basin, the valley between the Reculet (France) and Mount Salève (France). The Alps are visible in the background, covered by clouds

The canton is located in the Genevan basin. The region is bordered by the Lake Geneva and traversed by the major rivers of the Rhone flowing out of the lake and the Arve, whose source is located in the Mont-Blanc region. It is encircled by the Jura on its north-west; by the Vuache to its west, split from the Jura by the Rhone valley and protected by the Fort l'Écluse; by the Mont-de-Sion to the South; by the Salève to the south-east, a mountain locals refer to as the "mountain of Genevans" despite being located in France due to its easy access and proximity; and to the east are the Alps, whose highest peak, the Mont-Blanc, is often visible from many parts of the canton.

To the north-east of Salève, in Monniaz (municipality of Jussy), is located the highest point of the canton at 516 metres above sea level. The lowest point of the canton is along the Rhône south of Chancy at 332 metres.

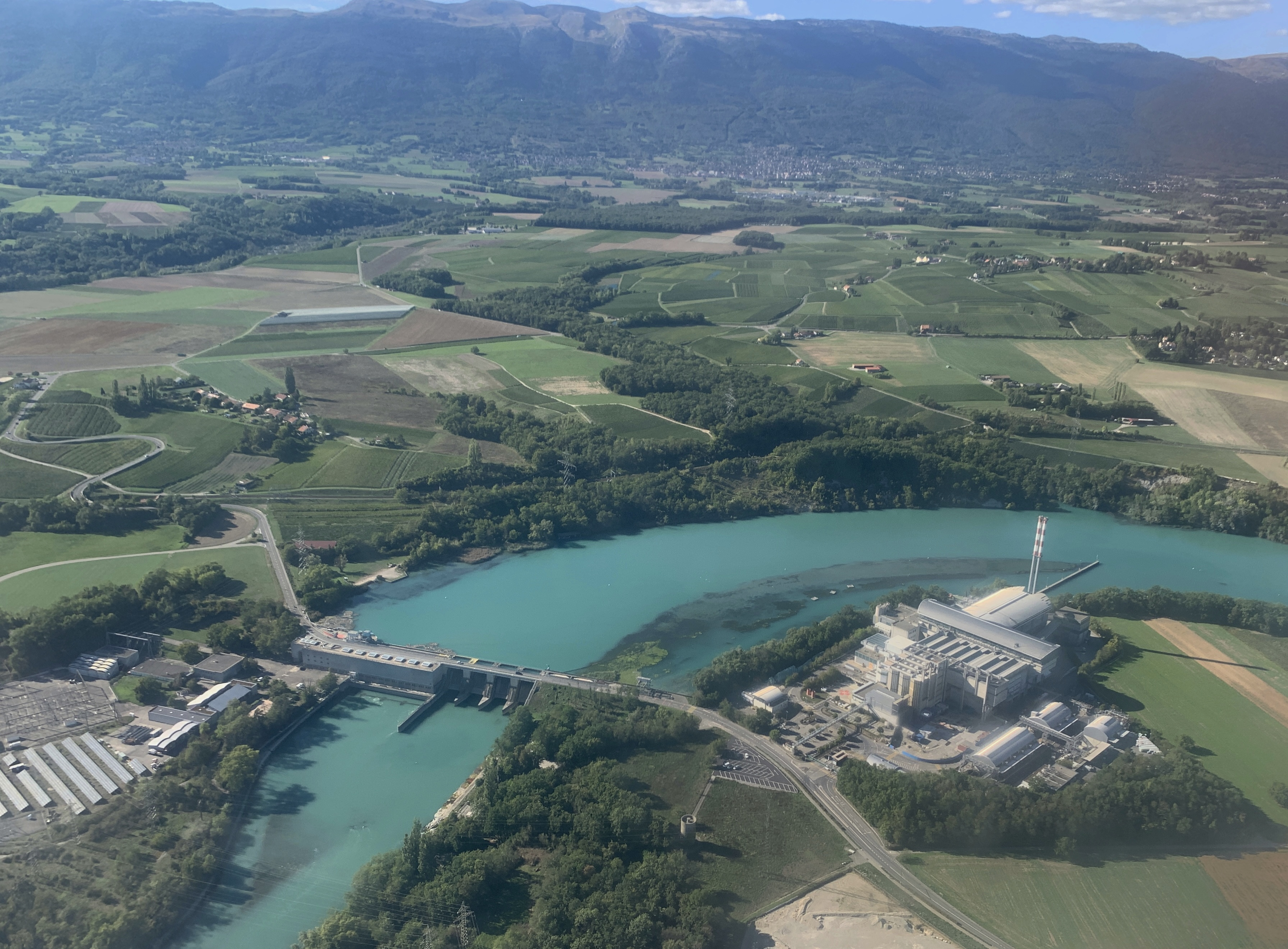
The SIG-owned incinerator of Cheneviers, Verbois dam, and the solar farm, bordering the river Rhône. In the background, the Mandement area and the Jura mountains.

The canton contains both the urban landscape of the city of Geneva and its surrounding towns, and a well-preserved rural landscape. The Mandement, in the north-west of the canton, is a partial valley dug by the river Allondon, a tributary of the Rhone, and regrouping the major wine-making towns of Satigny, Russin, and Dardagny. The Verbois dam built over the Rhone in that area supplies around 15% of the electricity needs of the canton and it links the Mandement to Champagne, on the opposite side of the river, between the towns of Russin and Aire-la-Ville.

Chancy, the westernmost municipality of Switzerland, is located in Champagne. The slope raises gently from the Rhone towards the main town of the region, Bernex, culminating in the Signal at 509.9 metres, the second-highest point of the canton. This region contains several historical villages such as Sézegnin, Athenaz, Avusy, Laconnex, Soral, Cartigny, and Avully, transferred to Geneva from the Duchy of Savoy in 1815.

At its narrowest point, the canton measures 2.1 km between the lake in Vegneron and the French border in Ferney-Voltaire. As this is the only territory connecting the canton towards the rest of Switzerland, this small piece of land is crossed by the main railway towards Lausanne and Neuchâtel; the A1 highway and its interchange; several roads; the international airport; two high-voltage electric lines; a gas pipeline; an oil pipeline; and a bicycle path.

== Politics ==
=== Municipalities ===
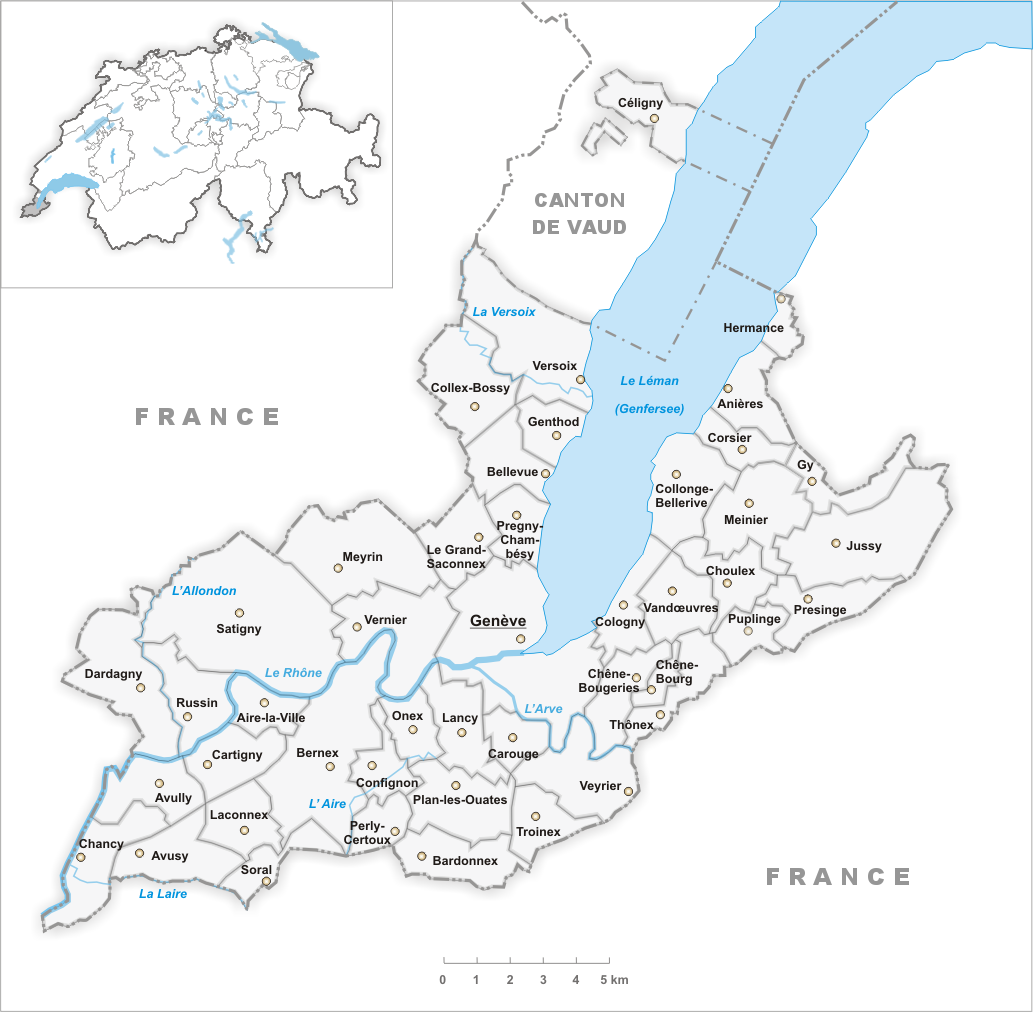
Municipalities of the canton of Geneva

The canton has forty-five municipalities, but does not divide these into districts like the majority of Swiss cantons do.

There were 13 municipalities with a population of over 10,000 as of 2020:

- Geneva, 203,856
- Vernier, 34,898
- Lancy, 33,989
- Meyrin, 26,129
- Carouge, 22,536
- Onex, 18,933
- Thônex, 14,573
- Versoix, 13,281
- Le Grand-Saconnex, 12,378
- Chêne-Bougeries, 12,621
- Veyrier, 11,861
- Plan-les-Ouates, 10,601
- Bernex, 10,258

=== Government ===
The constitution of the canton was established in 1847 and has since been amended several times. The cantonal executive government (Conseil d'État) has seven members, who are elected for five years.

The last regular election for the legislation 2018-2023 were held on 15 April 2018 and 6 May 2018.

Le Conseil d'État (CE), Legislation 2018–2023
Councillor (M. Conseiller d'Etat/ Mme Conseillère d'Etat)	Party	Head of Office (Département, since) of	elected since
Antonio Hodgers (Note: President (Président du Conseil d'Etat (PRE)) since 2019)	Les Verts (PES)	Département du territoire (DT), 2018	2013
Serge Dal Busco (Note: Vice President (Vice-président) 2019/20)	PDC	Département des infrastructures (DI), 2018	2013
Anne Emery-Torracinta	PS	Département de l'instruction publique, de la formation et de la jeunesse (DIP), 2013	2013
Thierry Apothéloz	PS	Département de la cohésion sociale (DCS), 2018	2018
Nathalie Fontanet	LPR	Département des finances et des ressources humaines (DF), 2018	2018
Pierre Maudet	LPR	Département du développement économique (DDE), 2019	2012
Mauro Poggia	MCG	Département de la sécurité, de l’emploi et de la santé (DSES), 2019	2013

Michèle Righetti is the chancellor of the canton (Chancilière d'Etat) since 2018.

=== Parliament ===
Le Grand Conseil of canton of Geneva for the mandate period of 2018-2023
1. Ensemble à gauche (PST-POP & Sol) (9.00%)
2. PS (16.0%)
3. Les Verts (PES) (15.0%)
4. PDC (11.0%)
5. PLR (28.0%)
6. UDC (8.00%)
7. MCG (11.0%)
8. not associated (2.00%)

The legislature, the Grand Council (Grand Conseil), has 100 seats, with deputies elected for four years at a time.

The last election was held on 15 April 2018.

In a similar way to what happens at the Federal level, any change to the Constitution is subject to compulsory referendum. In addition, any law can be subject to a referendum if it is demanded by 7,000 persons entitled to vote, and 10,000 persons may also propose a new law.

=== Federal elections ===
==== National Council ====
In 2019 the Republic and Canton of Geneva gained a seat and sent a total of 12 representatives to the National Council. The federal election held on 20 October 2019 did result in an electoral breakthrough for the Green Party (PES/GPS) which for the first time was the most popular party with a vote share of 24.6%. The Liberals (PLR/FDP) were relegated to the second place, losing 2.6% of their vote share and a seat in the National Council. Two mandates were also allotted to the Social Democratic Party (PS/SP) and the UDC/SVP receiving 14.7% and 13.7% respectively. The Christian Democratic People's Party (PDC/CVP) managed to hold their seat with 7.7% while the EAG coalition gained 7.4% of the votes and a seat. The election also resulted in the Geneva Citizens' Movement (MCG) losing their only seat with a decreased vote share of 5.4% compared to 7.9% in 2015. Voter turnout decreased to 38.2%, the lowest recorded among all cantons in 2019.

==== Council of States ====
The last elections to the Council of States (Switzerland) were held in two rounds taking place on 20 October 2019 and 10 November 2019 within the federal elections. The election resulted in two new members being seated after the second round of voting. Councillor Lisa Mazzone of the Green Party (PES/GPS) was elected with 45,998 votes and councillor Carlo Sommaruga, member of the Social Democratic Party (PS/SP) was elected with 41,839 votes. Outgoing councillors were Liliane Maury Pasquier of the Social Democratic Party and Robert Cramer of the Green Party which were both first elected in 2007. Both parties therefore maintained their representation in the council.

==== Federal election results ====
Percentage of the total vote per party in the canton in the National Council Elections 1971-2019
Party	Ideology	1971	1975	1979	1983	1987	1991	1995	1999	2003	2007	2011	2015	2019
FDP.The Liberals^{a}	Classical liberalism	19.2	16.6	14.7	16.2	18.0	12.8	13.5	12.7	7.3	7.7	18.6	20.5	17.9
CVP/PDC/PPD/PCD	Christian democracy	13.8	14.7	14.0	12.3	14.6	14.5	13.4	14.1	11.8	9.7	9.8	12.1	7.7
SP/PS	Social democracy	19.1	22.6	21.5	19.2	18.6	26.4	30.0	20.0	24.8	19.1	19.1	19.9	14.7
SVP/UDC	Swiss nationalism	* ^{b}	*	*	*	*	1.1	*	7.5	18.3	21.1	16.0	17.6	13.7
LPS/PLS	Swiss Liberal	14.1	16.0	21.3	19.1	18.1	22.1	17.7	18.5	16.8	14.8	^{c}	^{c}	^{c}
Ring of Independents	Social liberalism	6.2	2.4	*	*	*	*	*	*	*	*	*	*	*
EVP/PEV	Christian democracy	*	*	*	*	*	*	*	*	*	1.2	1.0	0.6	0.7
GLP/PVL	Green liberalism	*	*	*	*	*	*	*	*	*	*	3.2	2.3	5.4
BDP/PBD	Conservatism	*	*	*	*	*	*	*	*	*	*	*	1.0	1.0
PdA/PST-POP/PC/PSL	Socialism	20.8	18.0	19.9	9.5	8.7	7.8	9.4	8.7	2.7	1.9	1.3	*	^{e}
GPS/PES	Green politics	*	*	*	7.6	11.5	6.7	5.6	8.2	11.2	16.4	14.0	11.5	24.6
Solidarity	Anti-capitalism	*	*	*	*	*	*	3.8	8.0	5.4	4.9	5.2	6.1	^{e}
SD/DS	National conservatism	1.4	1.7	0.6	2.1	1.1	2.0	2.4	*	*	*	*	*	*
Rep.	Right-wing populism	5.4	6.9	6.5	12.2	6.9	^{d}	*	*	*	*	*	*	*
EDU/UDF	Christian right	*	*	*	*	*	*	*	*	*	*	*	0.2	^{f}
FPS/PSL	Right-wing populism	*	*	*	*	*	3.0	*	*	*	*	*	*	*
MCR/MCG	Right-wing populism	*	*	*	*	*	*	*	*	*	*	9.8	7.9	5.4
EAG	Eco-Socialism	*	*	*	*	*	*	*	*	*	*	*	*	7.4
Other		*	1.1	1.5	1.7	2.5	3.4	4.2	2.3	1.7	3.2	1.9	0.3	2.0
Voter participation %		47.0	45.4	37.6	44.5	38.6	39.6	35.6	36.3	45.9	46.7	42.4	42.9	38.2

^a FDP before 2009, FDP.The Liberals after 2009
^b "*" indicates that the party was not on the ballot in this canton.
^c Part of the FDP for this election
^d Combined with the SD for this election
^e Part of the EAG coalition for this election
^f Part of the MCR coalition for this election

== Demographics ==
=== Population by birthplace ===
Largest groups of foreign residents (2013)
Nationality	Number	% total (foreigners)
Portugal	36,518	7.7 (18.8)
France	27,231	5.7 (14.0)
Italy	20,591	4.3 (10.6)
Spain	14,346	3.0 (7.4)
United Kingdom	7,440	1.6 (3.8)
Germany	4,981	1.0 (2.6)
Kosovo	4,690	1.0 (2.4)
United States	4,637	1.0 (2.4)
Russia	3,870	0.8 (2.0)
Brazil	3,517	0.7 (1.8)
Turkey	2,263	0.5 (1.2)

The population of the canton (as of 2024) was 531,000. 305,726 people had Swiss citizenship, and 252,000 were born in Switzerland at birth.

In 2013, the population included 194,623 foreign-born residents, from 187 different nations, comprising 40.1% of the total population.

The population of the canton, as of December 2013, contained 168,505 people originally from Geneva (35.4%) and 112,878 Swiss from other cantons (23.7%). About 73% of foreign-born residents were from Europe (EU28: 64.4%), 9.1% from Africa, 9.0% from the Americas, and 8.5% from Asia. Including people holding multiple citizenship, 54.4% of people living in Geneva held a foreign passport.

=== Languages ===
In 2014, the predominant language of Geneva was French, spoken by 81.04% of the population at home; the next largest home languages were English (10.84%), Portuguese (9.89%), Spanish (7.82%) and German (5.32%); respondents were permitted to report more than one language.

=== Religion ===
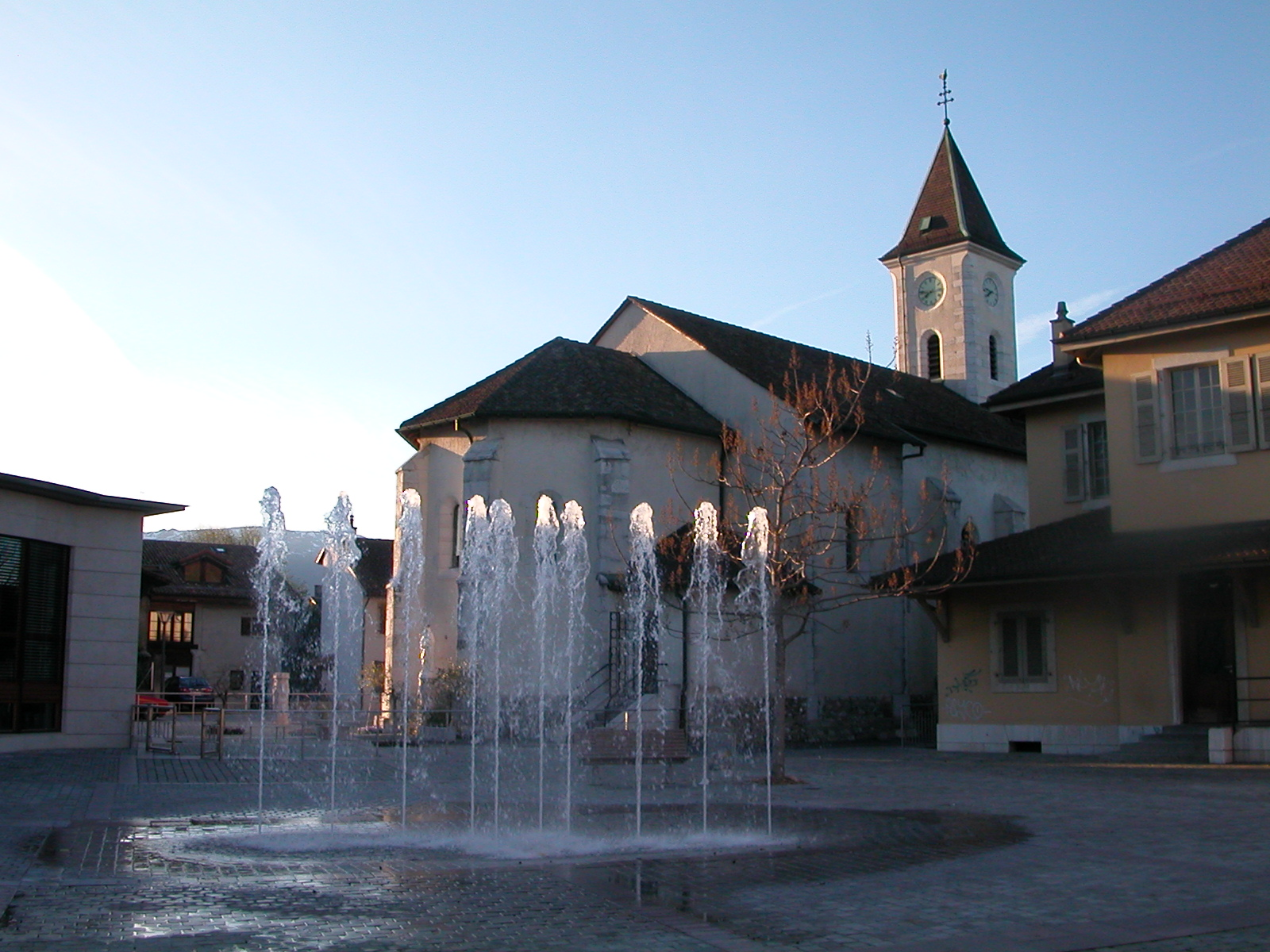
Village square in Meyrin

As home of John Calvin's Reformation, the canton of Geneva has traditionally been a Protestant Christian stronghold. However, during the 19th and 20th centuries, the Roman Catholic population of the canton increased dramatically, largely due to the expansion of the border in 1815 towards Catholic areas and to immigration from Catholic European countries; their community numbered 220,139 people or 44.5% as of 2017. Roman Catholics now outnumber members of the Swiss Reformed Church (65,629 people or 13.3% as of 2017) in the canton by far. The surrounding regions of France are mostly Roman Catholic.

In 2012, 5.4% of the Genevan population (aged 15 years and older) belonged to other Christian groups, 5.5% were Muslims, and 5.9% belonged to other religious groups. The remainder of the population was religiously unaffiliated or did not answer the census question.

=== Historical population ===
The historical population is given in the following table:

Historic Population Data
Year	Total Population	Swiss	Non-Swiss	Population share of total country
1850	64 146	49 004	15 142	2.7%
1880	99 712	63 688	36 024	3.5%
1900	132 609	79 965	52 644	4.0%
1950	202 918	167 726	35 192	4.3%
1970	331 599	219 780	111 819	5.3%
2000	413 673	256 179	157 494	5.7%
2020	506 343			5.9%

== Economy ==
Despite its relatively small size compared to other Swiss cantons, the canton of Geneva generates the fourth largest GDP of the country (CHF 50bn), behind the cantons of Zürich (CHF 143bn), Bern (CHF 78bn), and Vaud (CHF 54bn), and enjoys the third-largest GDP per capita in the country behind Basel-City and Zug.

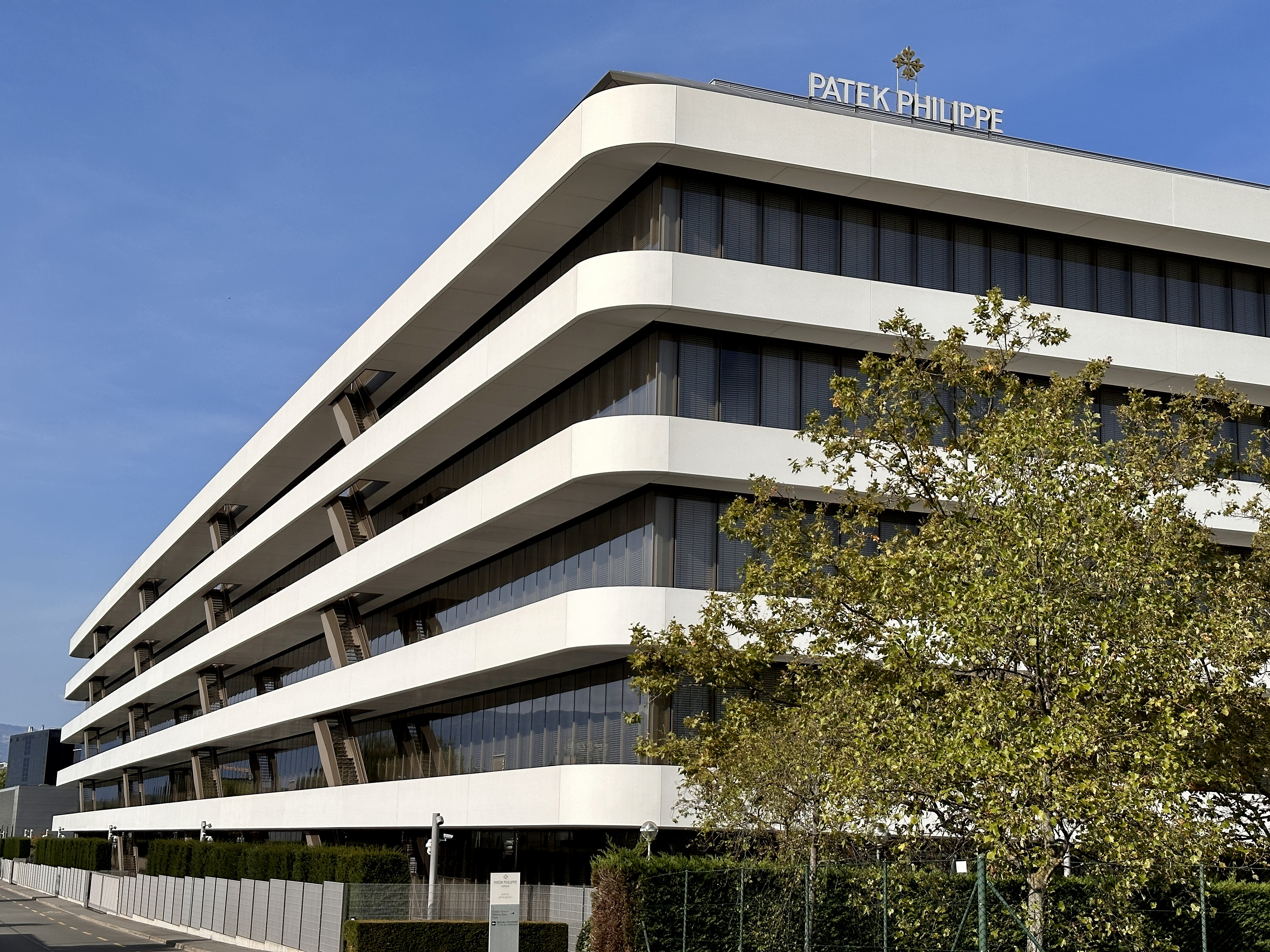
Headquarters of Patek Philippe in Plan-les-Ouates

Geneva's economy is largely service-driven. The canton consistently ranks as one of the strongest global financial centres. Three main sectors dominate the financial sector: commodity trading; trade finance, and wealth management.

Around a third of the world's free traded oil, sugar, grains and oil seeds is traded in Geneva. Approximately 22% of the world's cotton is traded in the Lake Geneva region. Other major commodities traded in the canton include steel, electricity, and coffee. Large trading companies have their regional or global headquarters in the canton, such as Trafigura, Cargill, Vitol, Gunvor, BNP Paribas, and Mercuria Energy Group, in addition to being home to the world's largest shipping company, Mediterranean Shipping Company. Commodity trading is supported by a strong trade finance sector, with large banks such as BCGE, Banque de Commerce et de Placements, BCV, Crédit Agricole, ING, Société Générale, BIC-BRED, Bank of China, and UBS, all having their headquarters in the region for this business.

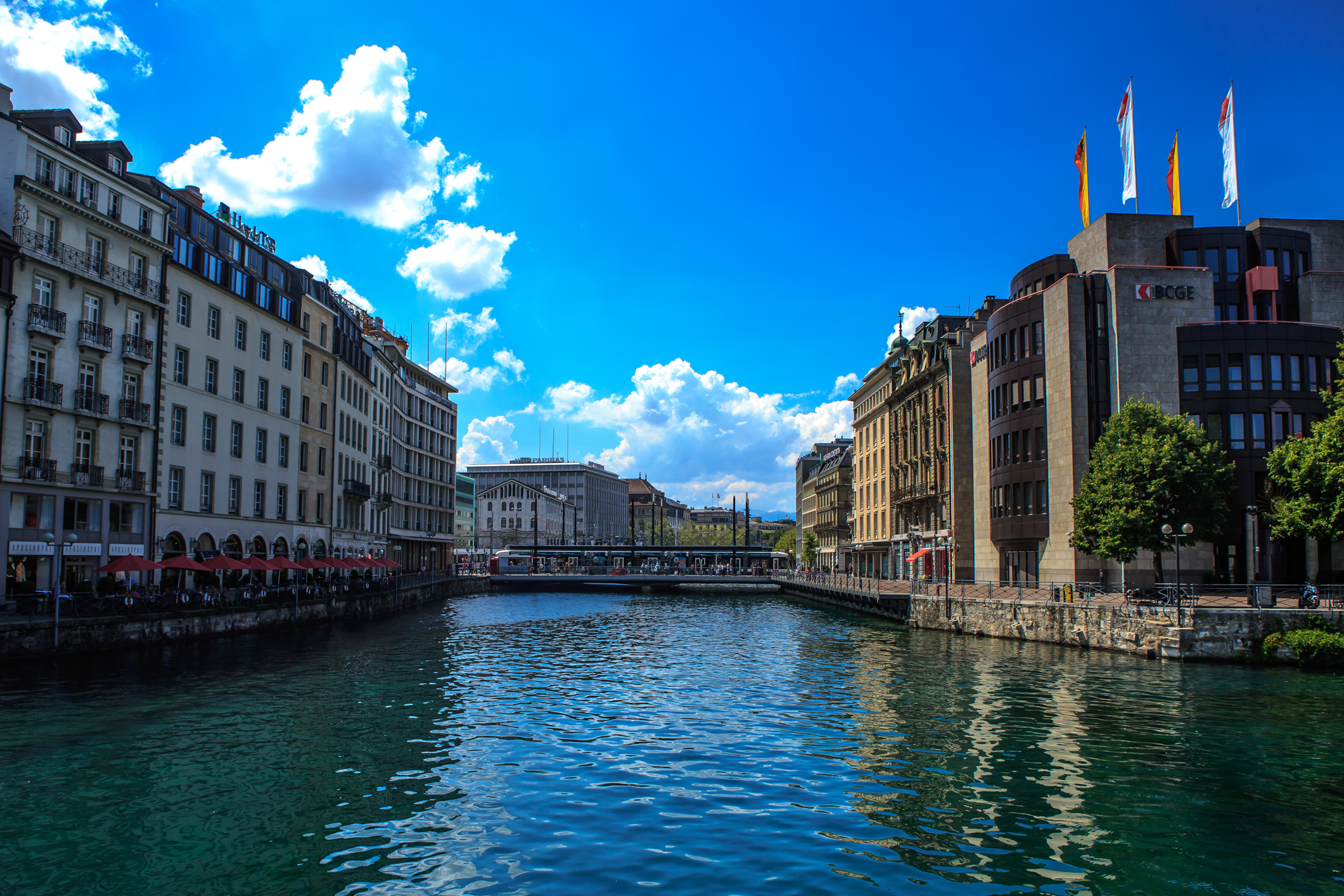
The headquarters of the local cantonal bank, the BCGE

Wealth management is dominated by non-publicly-listed banks, particularly Pictet, Lombard Odier, Union Bancaire Privée, Edmond de Rothschild Group, Mirabaud Group, Dukascopy Bank, Bordier & Cie, Banque SYZ, and REYL & Cie. In addition, the canton is home to the largest concentration of foreign-owned banks in Switzerland, such as HSBC Private Bank, JPMorgan Chase, Bank of China, Barclays, and Arab Bank.

Behind the financial sector, the next largest major economic sector is watchmaking, dominated by luxury firms Rolex, Richemont, Patek Philippe, and others, whose factories are mostly concentrated in the municipalities of Plan-les-Ouates and Meyrin.

Trade finance, wealth management, and watchmaking, approximately contribute two-thirds of the corporate tax paid in the canton.

Other large multinationals are also headquartered in the canton, such as Firmenich (in Satigny) and Givaudan (in Vernier), the world's two largest manufacturers of flavours, fragrances and active cosmetic ingredients; SGS, the world's largest inspection, verification, testing and certification services company; Alcon (in Vernier), a company specialising in eye-care products; Temenos, a large banking software provider; and the local headquarters for Procter & Gamble, Japan Tobacco International, and L'Oréal.

Although they do not directly contribute to the local economy, the canton of Geneva is also host to the world's largest concentration of international organisations and UN agencies, such as the Red Cross, the World Health Organization, the World Trade Organization, the International Telecommunication Union, the World Intellectual Property Organization, the World Meteorological Organization, and the International Labour Organization, as well as the European headquarters of the United Nations.

Its airport and centrality in the continent, also make Geneva a destination for congresses and trade fairs, of which the largest two are the Geneva Motor Show and Watches & Wonders, both held in Palexpo.

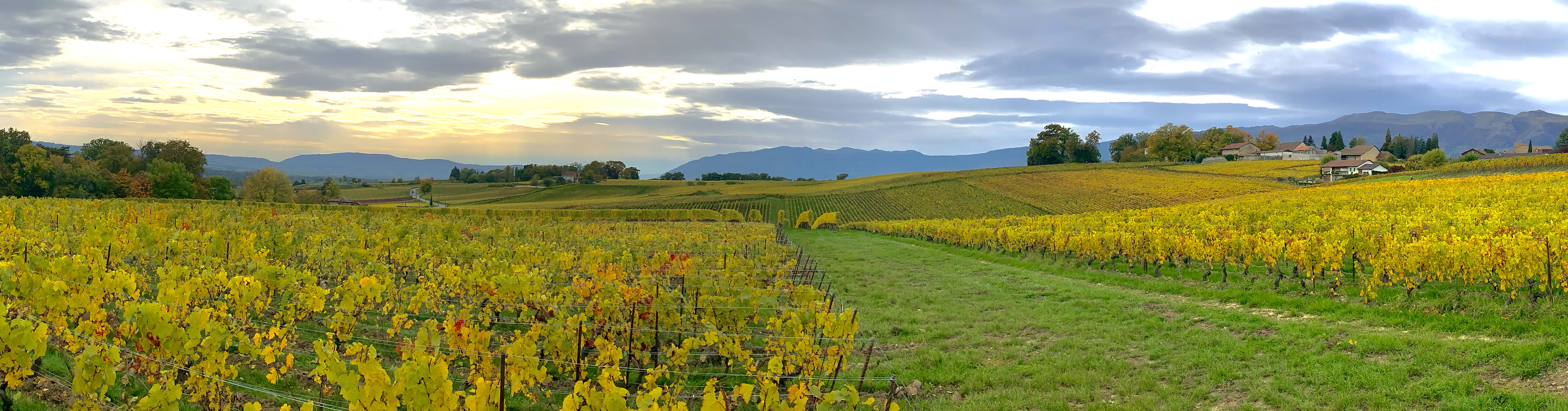
Geneva has the densest vineyards of Switzerland. Here, the largest wine-making municipality of Switzerland, Satigny.

Agriculture is commonplace in the hinterlands of Geneva, particularly wheat and wine. Despite its relatively small size, the canton produces around 10% of the Swiss wine and has the highest vineyard density in the country. The largest strains grown in Geneva are gamay, chasselas, pinot noir, gamaret, and chardonnay.

== Transport ==
The Léman Express network

Geneva is linked to the rest of Switzerland by trains operated by the Swiss Federal Railways, with main lines towards Brig in the canton of Valais via Lausanne, to St. Gallen via Lausanne, Fribourg, Bern and Zürich or alternatively via Neuchâtel on the Jura Foot Railway, and to Lucerne.

Since 1984 the French high-speed trains (TGV) serve Geneva, with services connecting to Paris and as far as Marseille, operated by TGV Lyria, a joint company owned by the SNCF and the Swiss Federal Railways. The SNCF also operates regional train services to Lyon.

The public transport of Geneva is operated by Transports Publics Genevois, which on average carry a total of 200 million passengers per year on its extensive network of trams, trolleybuses, buses, and boats, and by Lemanis, which operates the suburban rail network, the Léman Express. All the operators of the region operate under Unireso, so any ticket is valid in all the network within the canton as well as in France.

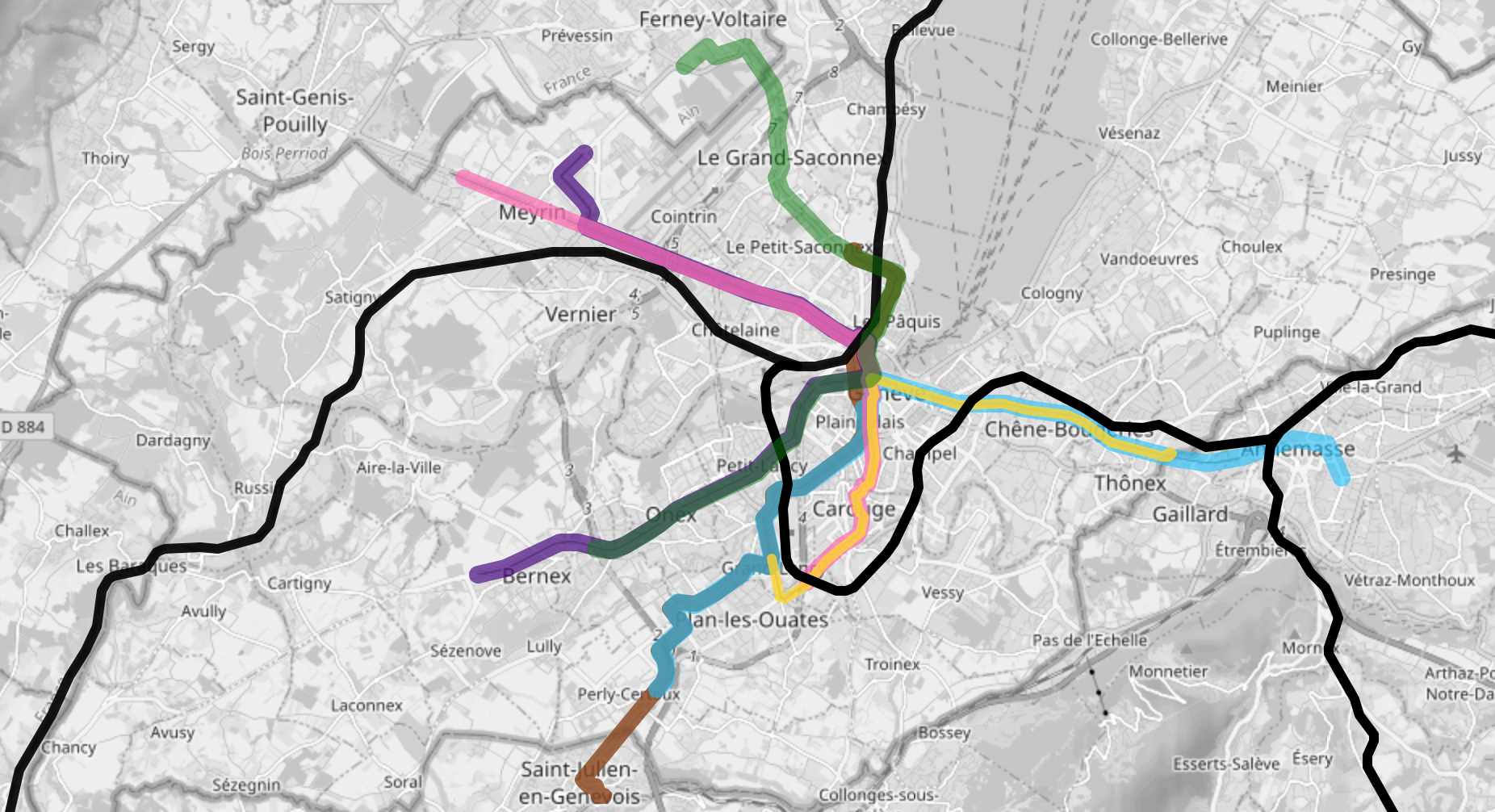
Tram and rail coverage of Geneva's urban area

After the inauguration of the missing rail link between Geneva and the border French city of Annemasse and the creation of the Léman Express in 2019, many secondary bus routes were re-designed as feeders to the new train stations. Soon after the opening of the rail network and prior to the COVID-19 crisis in 2020, it had met all its expectations in terms of passenger numbers with 25,000 daily users. Several municipalities of the canton, especially those in the Mandement (Satigny, Russin, Dardagny), and those on the right bank of the lake (from Chambésy to Versoix) rely heavily on the rail for their commuting.

The tram network is also an important element of cohesion of the canton, linking the city of Geneva to its dense urban surroundings formed by large municipalities such as Lancy, Meyrin, Vernier, Onex, and Bernex. Several extensions of the network are planned for the near future, including an extension towards the French city of Saint-Julien-en-Genevois via Plan-les-Ouates, and towards Grand Saconnex near the airport.

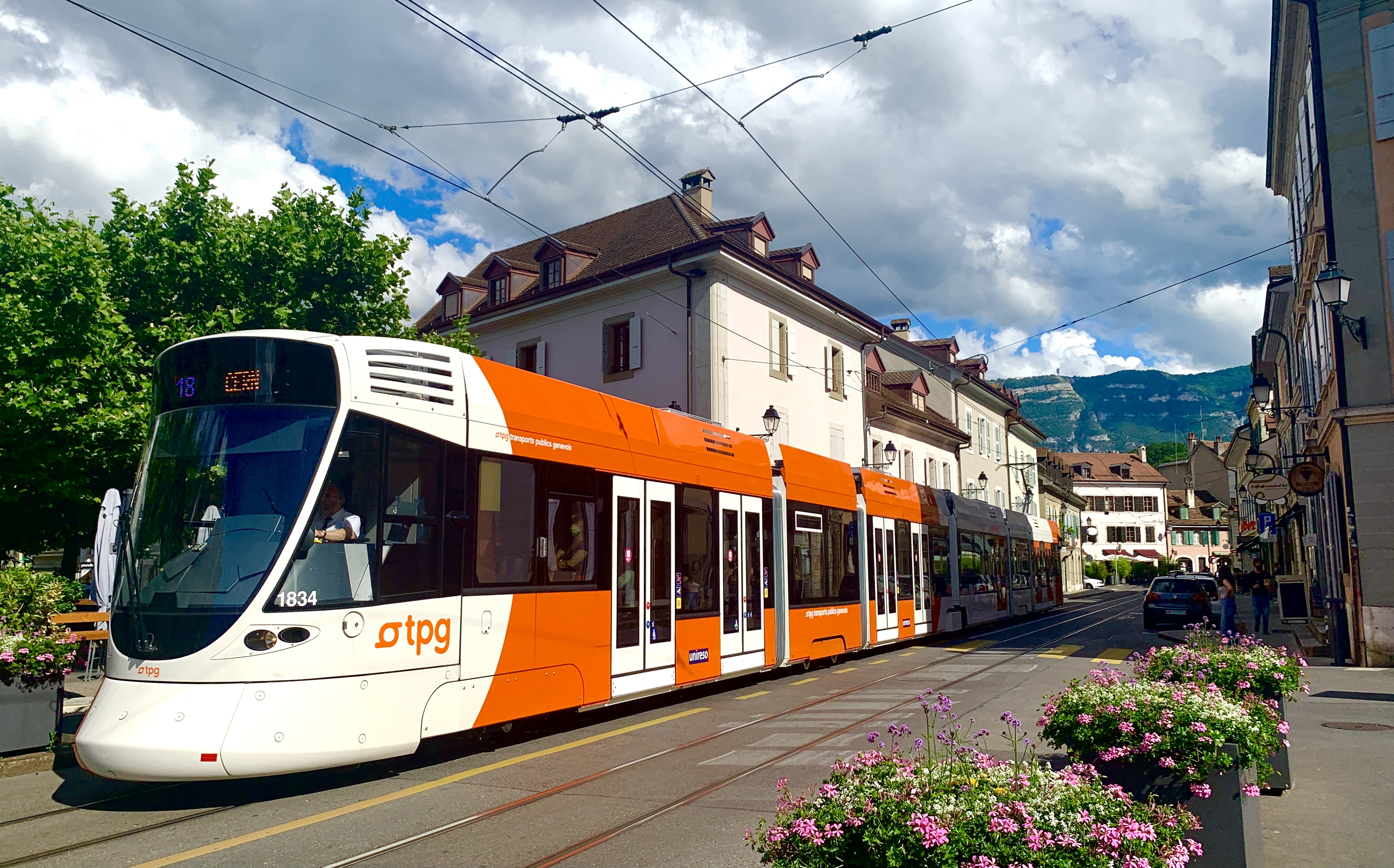
A tram in Carouge

In 1964, the first Swiss motorway, the A1, was built between Geneva and Lausanne as part of the investments carried out for the Swiss national exposition of 1964, and later it was extended all the way to the border with Austria. The canton is also linked to the French motorway system with the A40 autoroute, offering a speedy access to the Mont Blanc tunnel.

== Education ==
The main educational institution is the University of Geneva, founded in 1559 by John Calvin. It was originally called Schola Genevensis. The original buildings are no longer used by the university, and are now used by Collège Calvin.

The public system starts from the age of 4 in one of the 165 primary schools of the canton. This is followed in one of the 19 cycle d'orientation from the ages of 12 to 15. Students then choose to follow an academic route in one of the 11 collèges, or an apprenticeship/general studies in one of the 14 specialised schools.

In addition, the canton's private schools have a good reputation for academic excellence. Many of these schools, such as the International School of Geneva, and Institut Florimont, also offer the International Baccalaureate. This programme was founded in Geneva in the 1960s and it is still headquartered in the canton.

== Culture ==
The Jeûne genevois is a public holiday specific to Geneva, celebrated on the Thursday following the first Sunday of September.

L'Escalade, or Fête de l'Escalade (from escalade, the act of scaling defensive walls), is an annual festival held in December in Geneva, Switzerland, celebrating the defeat of the surprise attack by troops sent by Charles Emmanuel I, Duke of Savoy during the night of 11–12 December 1602 (Old style). The celebrations and other commemorative activities are usually held on 12 December or the closest weekend.
