= L'effet caribou =

- Created by: Jonas Schneiter
- Presented by: Louis-Maxime Renaud; Jonas Schneiter
- Country of origin: Switzerland
- No. of episodes: 13

Production
- Running time: about 10 minutes

Original release
- Network: La Télé; Léman Bleu; 20minutes.ch
- Release: September 30, 2012

L'effet caribou is a humorous television series broadcasting on three private Swiss TV channels: La Télé, Léman Bleu and 20minutes.ch

== The Premise ==
L'effet caribou, which borrows its format from the Canadian TV series surprise sur prise, premièred in 2012 on three private Swiss TV channels. Each episode consists of an interview of a Swiss celebrity conducted by a bogus journalist – played by the Canadian actor Louis-Maxime Renaud – who masquerades as a genuine interviewer working on behalf of a well-known Canadian TV station. The interviewee is under the impression, initially at least, that the situation is genuine. However, in order to provoke a reaction in front of the camera, the interviewer behaves in unexpected and unconventional ways, deliberately playing on the guest's particular character and/or behavioural traits to provoke a reaction.

== Presenter ==
The role of the interviewer in L’effet caribou is played by the Canadian actor Louis-Maxime Renaud, who was born in Saint-Raymond in Quebec. When conducting his bogus interviews he employs the pseudonym Marc Michaud. His guests are initially under the impression they are being interviewed by a genuine reporter working for a major Canadian television channel.

== Filming location ==
The interviews are conducted and filmed in a room in the Château d'Ouchy in Lausanne, Switzerland.

== Programme format ==
During the interviews, Renaud (as Marc Michaud) adopts various psychological strategies with his guests, his aim being to deliberately disconcert them with his unconventional behaviour: he improvises unexpected changes in attitude and reacts in unpredictable ways, for example.

A standard feature of the programme sees the interviewee presented with a special drink which is supposedly maple syrup based but actually contains a mixture of ingredients – different for each guest – such as salad dressing, ketchup, garlic, soy sauce and other edible but incompatible foodstuffs.

At the end of the show, the guest celebrity is informed that all has been a hoax. The proceedings are then rounded off amicably, with Jonas Schneiter, the show's producer, conducting a short interview with the guest, during which he/she is given the opportunity to describe the experience of participating in such an unexpected and unpredictable interview and their emotional responses to it.

== Interviewees ==
- Bastian Baker, singer — October 14, 2012
- Henri Dès, singer — November 25, 29 & 30, 2012
- Laurent Deshusses, comedian, actor — November 9, 2012
- Lolita Morena, TV host, former Miss Switzerland — November 16, 2012
- Thierry Barrigue, humorist, cartoonist and editor of Vigousse — October 21, 2012
- Christian Constantin, president of FC Sion in the canton of Valais, Switzerland — September 30, 2012
- Esther Mamarbachi, journalist, TV host, presenter and co-producer of a weekly television talk show entitled Infrarouge — October 7, 2012
- Peter Rothenbühler, journalist, editor of the magazines Blick für die Frau, SonntagsBlick, Schweizer Illustrierte and Le Matin, former program director of Tele 24, member of the Board of Edipresse — October 28, 2012
- Marc Bonnant, lawyer, former president of the Bar, recipient of the Prix du rayonnement de la langue française in June 2007 as well as being awarded a croix de chevalier of the National Order of the Legion of Honour by former French president Jacques Chirac in June 2003 and officier de l’ordre national de la Légion d’honneur by Nicolas Sarkozy in May 2011 — November 22, 2012

=== Marc Bonnant ===
A session occurred with Marc Bonnant, a famous Swiss lawyer who is renowned for his exceptional oratory, his aristocratic distinction, his refined politeness and his scrupulous respect of traditions and good manners. During the interview, Marc Michaud does not hesitate to introduce ostentatiously his fingers in his nostrils in front of the lawyer. Then, he interrupts the conversation and pretends that there is a persisting and horrendous smell all around. He argues that someone has impudently... farted; then he asks the lawyer if he is the author of the alleged... flatulence. The lawyer remains imperturbable and tells him: I have none physiology; therefore, I am a pure spirit. (Note: In French: « Je n’ai pas de physiologie; donc, je suis un pur esprit. »)

=== Bastian Baker ===
In front of Bastian Baker, Marc Michaud plays the role of someone who is upset and offended. He pretends that Bastian Baker has deliberately tried to humiliate him and that he wants to discredit him by the way he would have shown his professional and superior vocal art if one compares it to the amateur’s voice of Marc Michaud who had kindly started to hum one famous song from Bastian Baker’s repertoire in order to honor him. Then, Marc Michaud pushes the cap one notch above when he declares to be madly in love with Bastian Baker who answers him that he cannot share his feelings. As a reaction, Marc Michaud expresses his utter despair for not being loved as much as he loves him, then he starts to cry in front of his guest who is more and more embarrassed.

=== Strategy ===
Of course, all the aforesaid scenes are fictitious. Neither Marc Bonnant neither Bastian Baker nor any other guest is aware at any moment of the hidden reality, given that each of them is intimately convinced that he/she is mainly supposed to grant an interview to an important private Canadian television channel. This makes the situation even more equivocal. All those individual and appropriate strategies are meant to “test” the permeability, the patience, the endurance and the power of self-control of each interlocutor when one of them is led to face such an embarrassing, unexpected and almost surrealistic situation.
