= Dominique Warluzel =

Swiss lawyer (1957–2022)

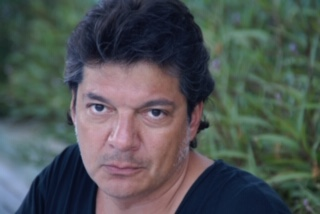
- Born: 29 May 1957; Pau, France
- Died: 8 March 2022 (aged 64); Geneva, Switzerland
- Education: University of Geneva
- Occupation: Lawyer
- Spouse: Corinne Warluzel
- Honours: Knight of the National Order of the Legion of Honour

Dominique Warluzel (29 May 1957 – 8 March 2022) was a Swiss lawyer, television producer, and playwright. He was registered with the Geneva Bar.

== Education ==
Dominique Warluzel attended the Institut Florimont from 1965 to 1977 until he obtained his type-B federal maturity diploma (Latin). From 1974 to 1977, Warluzel studied theatre with actor and professor Michel Cassagne at the Conservatoire de Musique de Genève. He went on to attend the University of Geneva, where he obtained his law degree in 1981. Waruvel passed the bar exam in April 1983.

While in school Warluzel played table tennis and in 1969, won a junior Geneva table tennis championship title. He was later awarded the title of Swiss Junior Team Champion in 1972 while playing for Hugo Urchetti's Silver Star. Warluzel also held a black belt in jujutsu.

== Career ==
=== Legal career ===
After passing the bar exam in April 1983 Warluzel began working at Poncet, Turrettini, Amaudruz, & Neyroud, where he started as a trainee. Over time he became a full employee and later partner of the firm, staying at the business until 1990.

In 1983 Warluzel defended Édouard Bois-de-Chesne, who abducted the daughter of French author Frédéric Dard. He went on to litigate other criminal cases such as the Banque cantonale de Genève case. He also served as the lawyer for actors such as Isabelle Adjani, Christopher Lambert, and Henri Verneuil, and in 1996 the Bonnant Warluzel & associés law firm with Marc Bonnant. In 2002, he defended ambassador Peter Friederich in a case of money-laundering.

=== Television ===
In 1987 Warluzel presented his first program on Télévision Suisse Romande, Profil de..., where he presented profiles of celebrities and personalities, some of which he represented as a lawyer. He went on to become a producer and presenter of the shows "Justice en marche" with Valérie Bierens de Hahn, Vérité, vérités with Bernard Pichon, Au-delà des grilles, Duel, and L'Étude with Béatrice Barton. Warluzel would work with Barton again in 2010 to create and present the show Dans mon cinéma, which broadcast on Radio Télévision Suisse, Orange Cinéma Géants in France, and RTBF in Belgium.

=== Theatre ===
During 2012 Warluzel wrote the play FRATRICIDE, which premiered on 1 October 2013 at the BFM in Geneva. The play went on to perform as part of the 2014 Festival d'Avignon at the La Luna for a total of 24 performances. Jean-Pierre Kalfon and Pierre Santini performed in the play, which was directed by Delphine de Malherbe and produced by Pascal Legros and Patrick Messmer.

The play was well received by the critic and general public and a series of performances were organized at the Théâtre de Poche Montparnasse in Paris, where it ran from 4 November 2014 until 1 March 2015.

=== Sports ===
From 1989 to 1990, Warluzel served as President of the Servette FC of Geneva.

== Legion of Honor ==
In 2005, Dominique Warluzel was made a Knight of the National Order of the Legion of Honour. This distinction was awarded to him on 7 October 2005 by Jean Piat, member of the Comédie Française.

== Personal life ==
Warluzel was married to Corinne Warluzel and together they lived in the Bahamas. He died on 8 March 2022, at the age of 64.

=== Health ===
During January 2013 Warluzel experienced an ischemic cerebrovascular accident (CVA Stroke) in Nassau, Bahamas, where he resided. As part of his treatment he was operated on and underwent trepanning. In July of the same year Warluzel displayed hemiparesis on the left side of his body during an interview with Darius Rochebin on the Radio Télévision Suisse broadcast of Pardonnez-moi. In the interview he acknowledged that his pugnacity in his professional life could have been a contributing factor to his stroke.

Warluzel underwent physical medicine and rehabilitation. His progress was undone in January 2014 after he hit his head during a fall, which gave him a subdural hematoma. The accident left him paralyzed and despondent. He briefly considered ending his life with a gun that became involved in a legal issue with a caregiver. In March 2019 Warluzel experienced acute respiratory failure while staying at the Hôtel Métropole.

=== Legal issues ===
Approximately two years after his 2014 fall, Warluzel was receiving treatment from a caregiver in a medically equipped suite in the Geneva luxury hotel La Réserve. On 2 January 2016, Warluzel fired a weapon at his caregiver as she was leaving the room. Per his lawyer, Warluzel and his caregiver were having a financial dispute over the cost of his health care, approximately CHF 2600. Warluzel stated that he was unhappy with the level of care he had received and refused to pay the caregiver, as he was not fully satisfied. The caregiver left the room and Warluzel discharged a weapon in her direction, which he maintained was not intended to kill or cause any bodily harm. His caregiver gave a conflicting version of the events.

Warluzel was taken into custody and held in the prison ward of a local hospital. Upon learning of the news, friends and acquaintances of Warluzel took to the media to express their response to the events that varied from disbelief to concern over how he obtained the gun. His colleague Marc Bonnant defended Warluzel's version of the events and served as his council with Nicholas Antenen, stating that the amount would not be worth killing someone over. A psychiatric evaluation was ordered and forensics measured the distance between the bullet hole and the location of the caregiver to determine the level of danger and intent. The caregiver responded via her lawyer Yaël Hayat, who said that his client felt grief and empathy towards Warluzel rather than anger. He further remarked that she did not believe that he acted with the intent to kill or harm her.

On 19 January 2016, Bonnant and Antenen stated that they were temporarily withdrawing from the defense team due to a potential conflict of interest over the handling of the gun used by Warluzel. Also included in the statement was that they were part of the same law firm as Warluzel. The gun had previously been held in the law firm's study safe and was delivered to Warluzel via a chauffeur, as he wanted it for self defense from burglars. Because of this, further investigations were needed and Pascal Maurer took over as Warluzel's council. Of the reasons for the gun, Warluzel would later admit that he had intended to commit suicide.

Warluzel was ultimately given a sentence of 30 months, 24 of which were suspended, and ordered to pay his caregiver 170,000 francs.
