= Peter Friederich =

Former Swiss diplomat and criminal

Peter Friederich (born 1942 in St Gallen) is a former Swiss ambassador to Luxembourg.

He was a career diplomat, working in the Swiss Foreign Ministry since 1971 and had served as ambassador to Vietnam and Cuba. He was made ambassador to Luxembourg in December 1999.

In July 2002, he was arrested for assisting drug smugglers, embezzlement and fraud. During his time as an ambassador, Friederich invested money on behalf of friends in the stock market. He would promise a higher than average return on the investments. After the stock market crash in 2000, he lost CHF5 million. He was arrested after CHF2.37 million was deposited into his private bank account by Antonio Florido Sosa, a Spanish citizen who is thought to be involved in drugs trade and money laundering. The money was then transferred to various bank accounts that Swiss prosecutors claim were the accounts of people involved with drugs or money laundering.

His trial began on May 8, 2005 in Federal Criminal Court in Bellinzona. Friederich hired Dominique Warluzel as his lawyer. He was convicted and sentenced to three and a half years in prison.
