= Monniaz =

Coordinates: 46.242°N 6.306°E

- Village
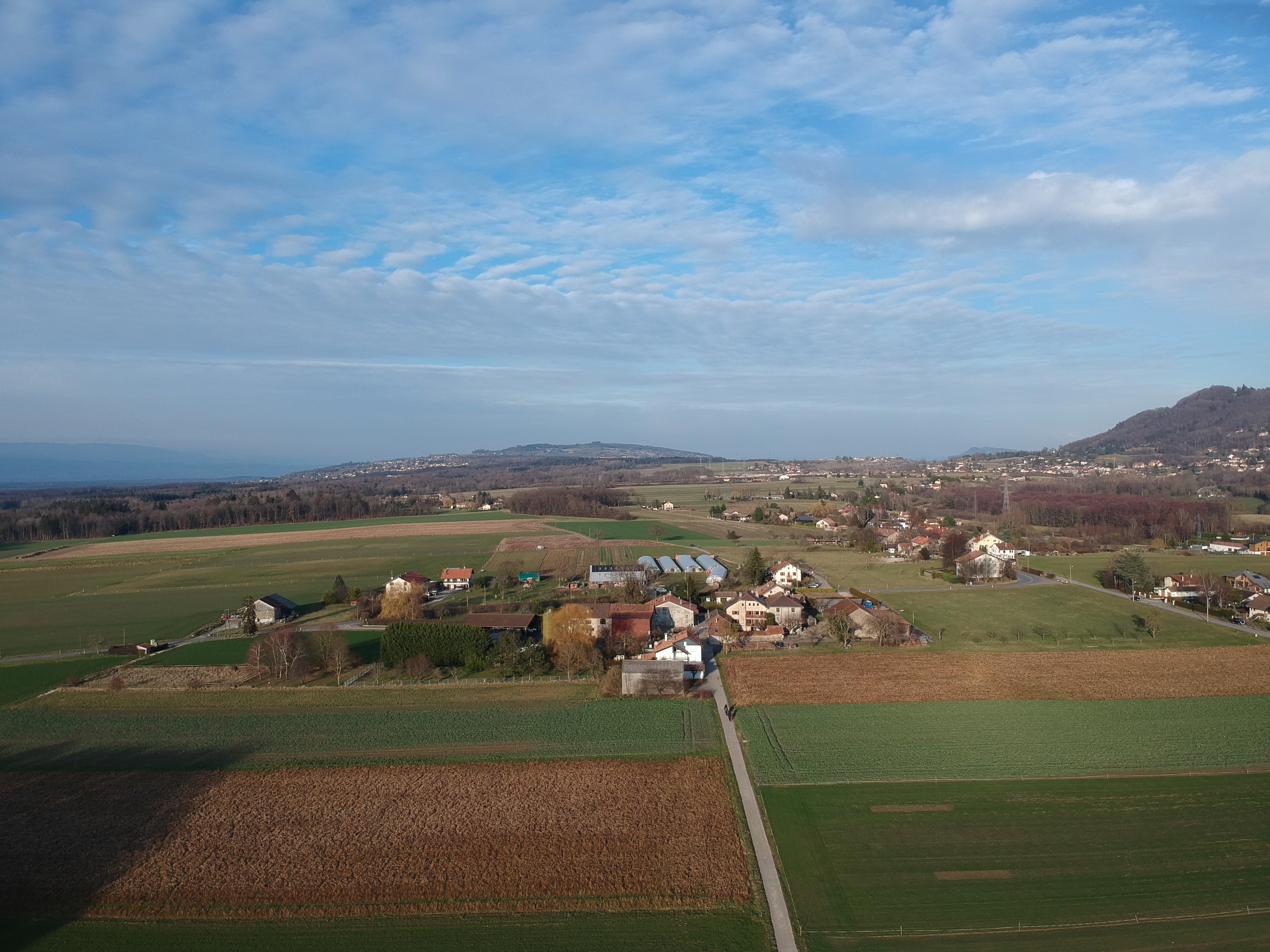
- Aerial view of Monniaz, hamlet of Jussy

- Location in Switzerland
- Elevation: 513 m (1,683 ft)

Monniaz is a village in the municipality of Jussy in Switzerland. At 513 metres it is highest place in the canton of Geneva and also its easternmost village. The highest point of the canton (516 m) is located north of Monniaz, near Les Arales (French border). It is also the lowest of the cantons' high points.
