= Léman Bleu =

Television channel in Geneva, Switzerland

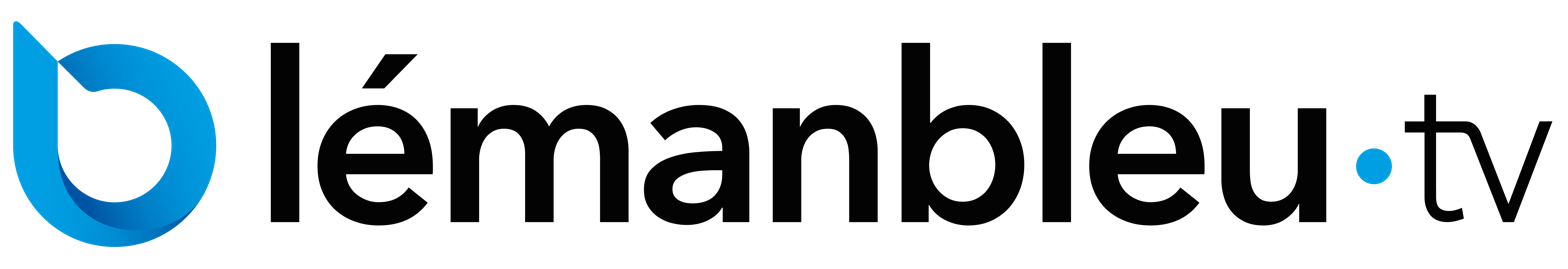
- Logo
- Broadcast area: Switzerland
- Headquarters: Geneva, Switzerland

Programming
- Picture format: 1080i (HDTV); 480i (SDTV)

History
- Launched: October 1996; 29 years ago

Links
- Website: www.lemanbleu.ch

Léman Bleu is a local television channel in Geneva, founded in 1996 and distributed via cable. The station has national coverage with its federal license and offers a varied line-up.

== History ==
The idea of a local television station emerged in the mind of Michel Vieux, former director of Télégenève, and Albert Knechtli, member of the cable company's directive committee. TV Léman SA was founded on 26 January 1995 by 20 shareholders. It set up headquarters at La Gravière, Les Acacias, and started broadcasting on 21 October 1996, after receiving approval from the city of Geneva, especially thanks to the support of administrative councelor Michel Rossetti. Its founding director was Jean-François Acker (founder of Couleur 3).

Michel Chevrolet left all of its presenting functions on 21 April 2010 in order to focus on a political career. He was replaced by Alain Gagliardi by the end of June that same year. In 2015, Laurent Keller became its director. In June, he made the channel a worldwide pioneer in "mojo" (mobile journalism) by creating a news bulletin entirely made with a smartphone. The experience sparked curiosity among international media outlets and the specialized press.

In 2019, Léman Bleu became the rights holder for Switzerland of that year's Laver Cup. During the weekend of the competition, the channel reached 598,000 viewers at least once and 336,000 unique viewers. On 26 August 2019, Léman Bleu unveiled its current logo.

In readiness for the 2020 US presidential elections, the news team hired journalist Laurence Haïm to comment the duel between Joe Biden and Donald Trump.

In its 2020 report, Medienquälitat Schweiz estimated that Le Journal de Léman Bleu was the best news program among the Swiss regional private television stations.

At the end of 2020, Philippe Verdier joins the news team and launches Go solutions durables. Former RTS journalist Laetitia Guinand joins the team in early 2021 and launches, that September, Le PoinG, a debate program.

On 23 February 2022, Valentin Emery presented his final news bulletin on Léman Bleu after having worked at the channel since 2013.

On 11 May 2022, Léman Bleu secured a five-year agreement with Sunrise UPC to serve as the exclusive free-to-air broadcaster of the National League ice hockey in Romandy until 2027, replacing RTS, which had traditionally held the broadcasting rights.

In September 2022, its news bulletin received a Q d’Or from Medienqualität Schweiz in recognition of the strongest qualitative improvement among news programs.

On 30 April 2023, after an edition related to the election of the Council of State of Geneva, an Extinction Rebellion activist glued his hand on the presenter's pulpit, before evacuating the studio. This attracted worldwide attention, after that, the channel invited the activist.
