= Institut Florimont =

Coordinates: 46.1943°N 6.1151°E

- Geneva; Switzerland

Information
- Established: 1905; 120 years ago
- Gender: Mixed
- Age: 3 to 18
- Website: https://www.florimont.ch/en/

The Institut Florimont is a private school in Geneva, Switzerland. It was founded in 1905 by the Congrégation des Missionnaires de Saint François de Sales, soon after a law in France prohibited religious congregations of any persuasion. The Institut Florimont started out as a private catholic French-speaking boarding school for boys.

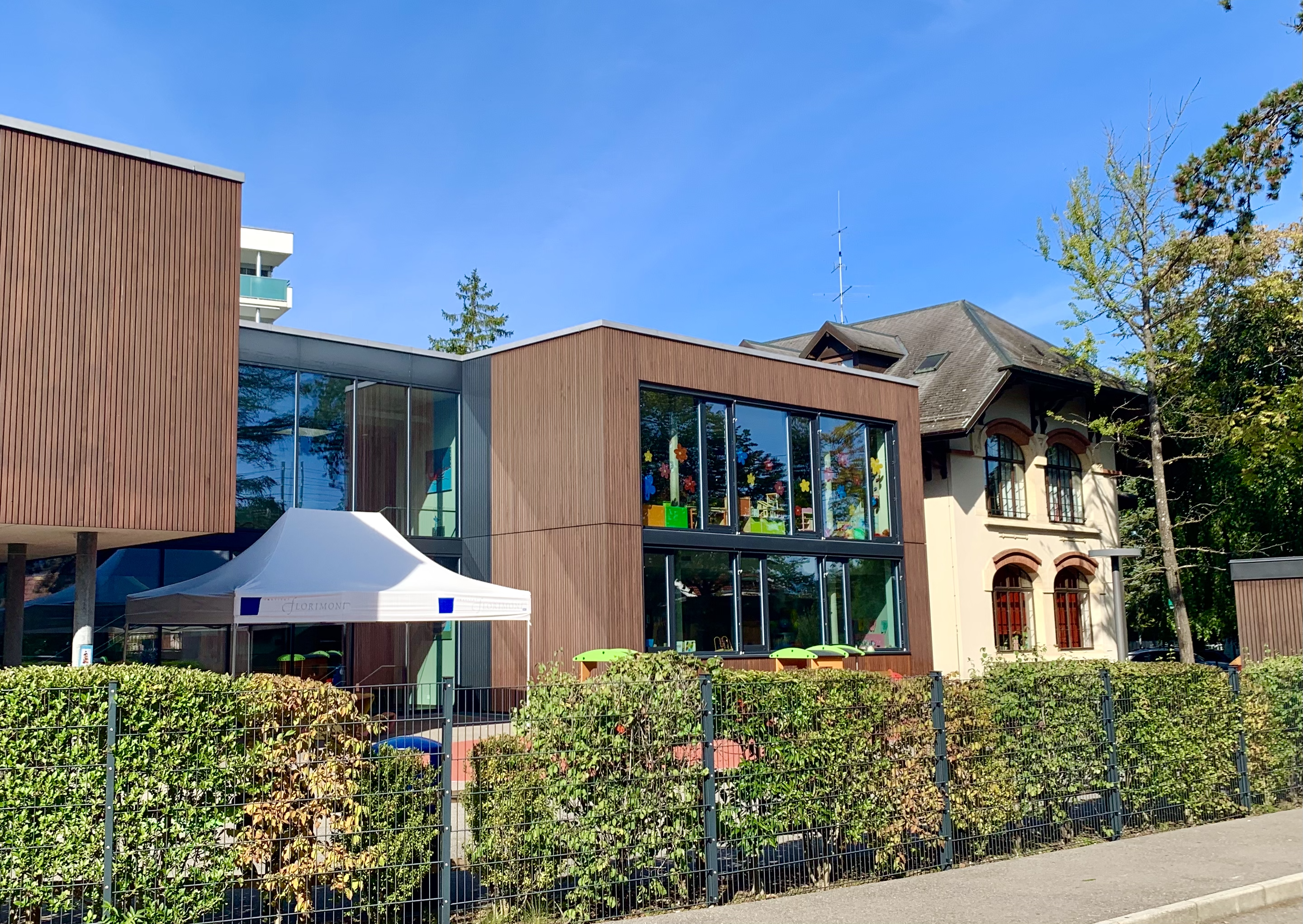
The maternelle building

However, the school has been directed by a lay person since 1995, and has accepted girls at the secondary II level since 1978. In 1995, the entire school became co-ed, boarding was no longer offered, and the pre-school classes were opened.

== Accreditation ==
Florimont's (upper) secondary education (Middle and High School) is approved as a Mittelschule/Collège/Liceo by the Swiss Federal State Secretariat for Education, Research and Innovation (SERI)., one of only two private schools in the canton to receive the accreditation.

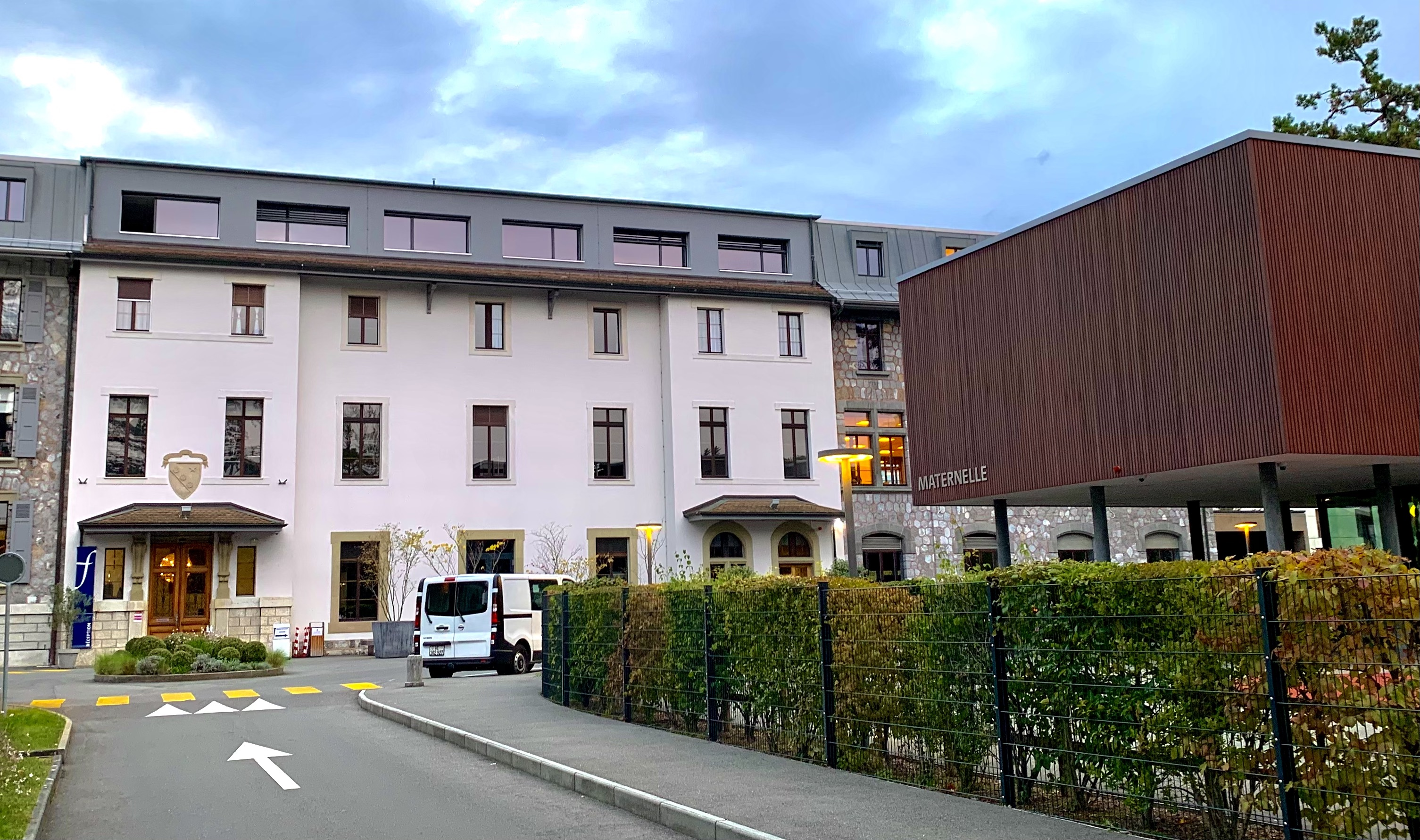
The main building of the school

== Curriculum ==
The school offers a complete curriculum from pre-school (starting at 3 years). Students can choose to complete their studies in any of the following three branches: the cantonal maturité gymnasiale; the French baccalauréat, and the IB Diploma Programme.

== Notable alumni ==
- Benjamin de Rothschild
- Christopher Lambert
- Vittorio Emanuele, Prince of Naples
- Alain Morisod
- John Dupraz
- Dominique Warluzel
- Joachim Havard de la Montagne
- Dominique de La Rochefoucauld-Montbel
