= Vuache =

Le Vuache
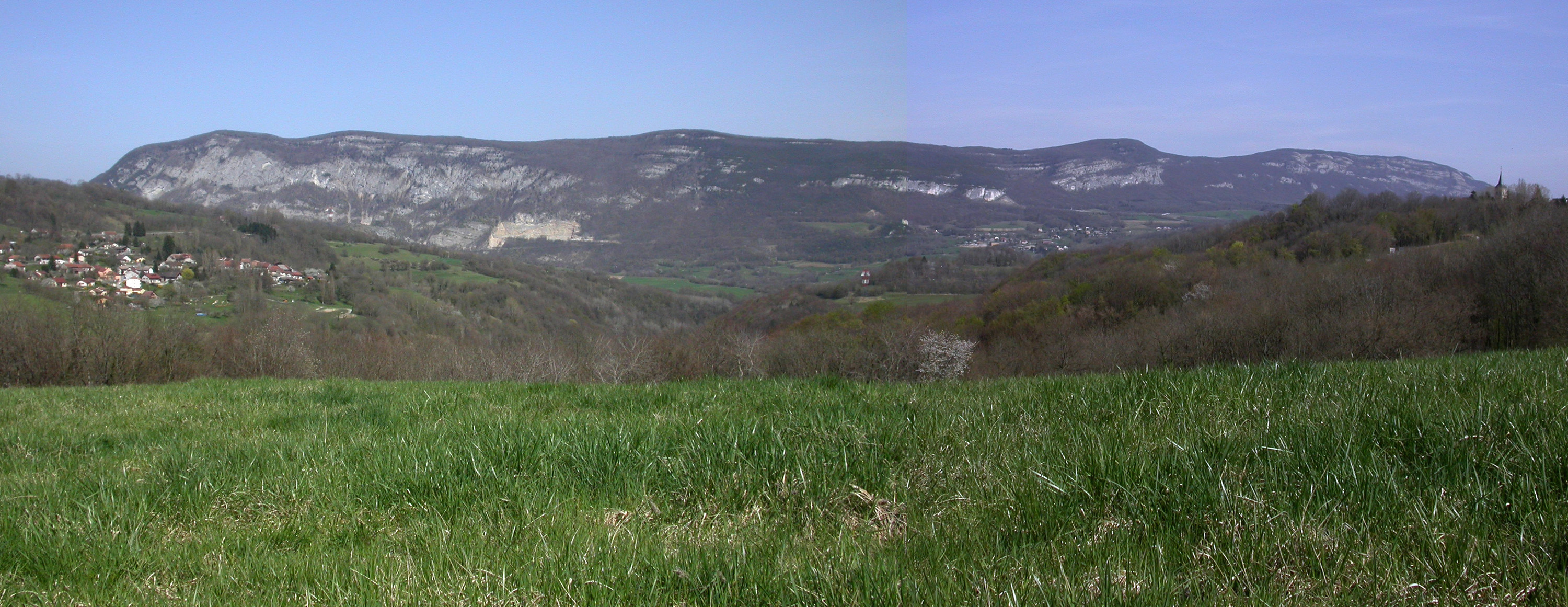

Highest point
- Elevation: 1,105 m (3,625 ft)
- Coordinates: 46°03′28″N 5°56′24″E

Geography
- Location within France
- Location: Haute-Savoie, France

The Vuache is a range of hills in eastern France, close to the border with Switzerland (the nearest city is in fact Geneva). To the north lies the Jura and to the south the Alps.

At their northern end, the hills drop steeply down to the River Rhône. The Vuache Tunnel, carrying the A40 Geneva to Lyon motorway, cuts through the hills.

The oak woodlands along the northwest edge of the Vuache support very high densities of western Bonelli's warblers, and Eurasian eagle owl nest on the cliffs here.
