= Marc Bonnant =

Swiss lawyer

Marc Bonnant (born 24 October 1944 in the Canton of Ticino, Switzerland) is a Swiss lawyer, famous for his oratorical art (in French).

He is the son of a diplomat; in 1959, he moved to Geneva and learned French. Marc Bonnant is Officer of the National Order of the Legion of Honour and received the Prix du rayonnement français (in 2007).

In the 1980s, Marc Bonnant defended Licio Gelli. In 1987, Bonnant brought Gelli (who was under international arrest warrant) back to Geneva in his private car to surrender to justice.

According to the Panama Papers, Marc Bonnant is or was director of at least 176 off-shore shell corporations (registered through Mossack Fonseca, with customers such as Khulubuse Zuma).
