= Francesca Pometta =

Swiss diplomat (1926–2016)

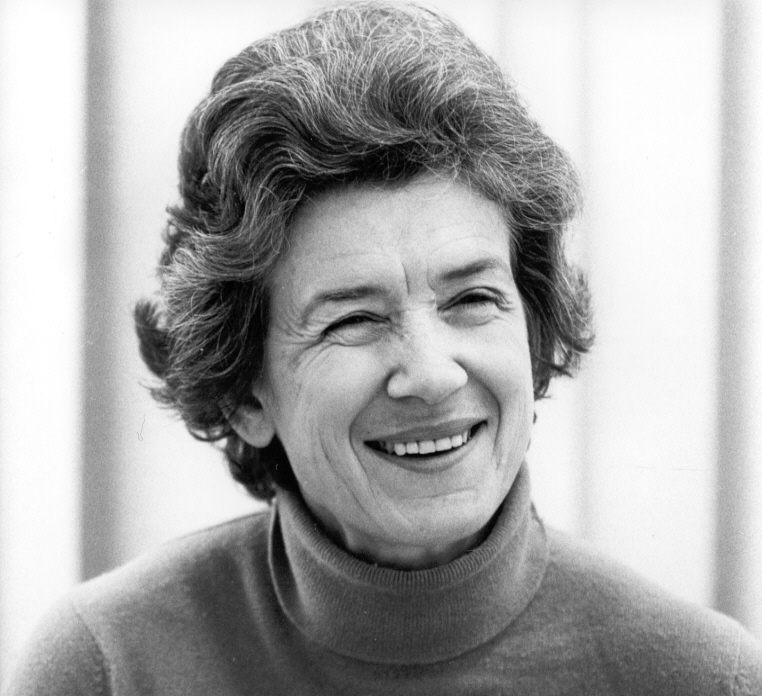

Swiss Ambassador to Italy, Malta, and San Marino
- In office 1987–1991

Director of the Permanent Mission of Switzerland to the United Nations
- In office 1982–1987

Deputy Director of the Political Division III at the Federal Department of Foreign Affairs of Switzerland
- In office 1977–1982

Personal details
- Born: Francesca Pometta; June 24, 1926 Geneva, Switzerland
- Died: March 16, 2016 (aged 89) Genthod, Switzerland
- Education: University of Lausanne
- Occupation: Diplomat

Francesca Pometta (June 24, 1926 – March 16, 2016) was a Swiss diplomat. She was the first woman to serve as a diplomat for Switzerland.

== Biography ==
Pometta was born on June 24, 1926, in Geneva, Switzerland. Her father was Carlo Pometta, a lawyer and judge, and her mother was Monique Pfäffli. Upon completing her education at the University of Lausanne, Pometta joined the Federal Political Department (DPF) of Switzerland. From 1958 to 1960, Pometta worked as a clerk for the DPF, before she was posted at the Swiss embassy in Washington, D.C.

In 1966, Pometta was appointed as the Swiss observer of the United Nations in New York City. She later worked at the Swiss embassy in Rome before being appointed as a deputy director for the Federal Department of Foreign Affairs. In 1975, Pometta became the first Swiss woman to reach the rank of "minister". From 1981 to 1987, she served as the head of the Swiss mission to the United Nations, before she was appointed as the ambassador to Italy, Malta and San Marino. Pometta was the first female ambassador in Swiss history.

In 1991, Pometta retired from active diplomatic service. Pometta dedicated her post-diplomatic career towards serving in the International Committee of the Red Cross from 1991 to 1996, and as a member of an international commission to provide aid for Holocaust victims from 1997 to 2000.

Pometta retired to the Swiss town of Genthod. On March 16, 2016, she died of natural causes at age 89.
