= Annemie Fontana =

Swiss sculptor and painter

Jacqueline Annemie Fontana (14 December 1925 – 25 October 2002), was a Swiss sculptor and painter.

== Life ==
Fontana was born in Versoix, Canton of Geneva. Her father was the painter Alois Fontana. Shortly after her birth the family moved to Zürich. From 1943 to 1946, Annemie Fontana was an apprentice in an Haute couture atelier and finished her training as a tailor. Afterwards she trained as a ceramist at Gebrüder Müller in Lucerne. In 1950 she established her first studio in the "Alte Mühle" (Old Mill) at Mühlebachstrasse, Zürich. In 1954 she displayed her first sculptures. In 1960 she gave up her profession as a tailor and became a full-time artist. Since 1969, she lived and worked in Zumikon where Max Bill also lived and with whom she was friends. Fontana won several competitions for works in public spaces. Her works were displayed at solo as well as at group exhibitions mainly in the Zürich area, and also elsewhere in Switzerland. She also took part in international group exhibitions: Florence (1967), The Hague (1968), Tel Aviv (1972), Haifa, Jerusalem, Budapest, Antwerp (1973), Lindau (1977) and again Budapest (1978). Annemie Fontana died on 25 October 2002 in Zürich.

== Work ==
Fontana's works include sculptures depicting animals, abstract sculptures made of polyester (called "phantoms"), large sculptures made of metal and polyester, metal heads as well as prints such as screen prints.

=== Examples ===
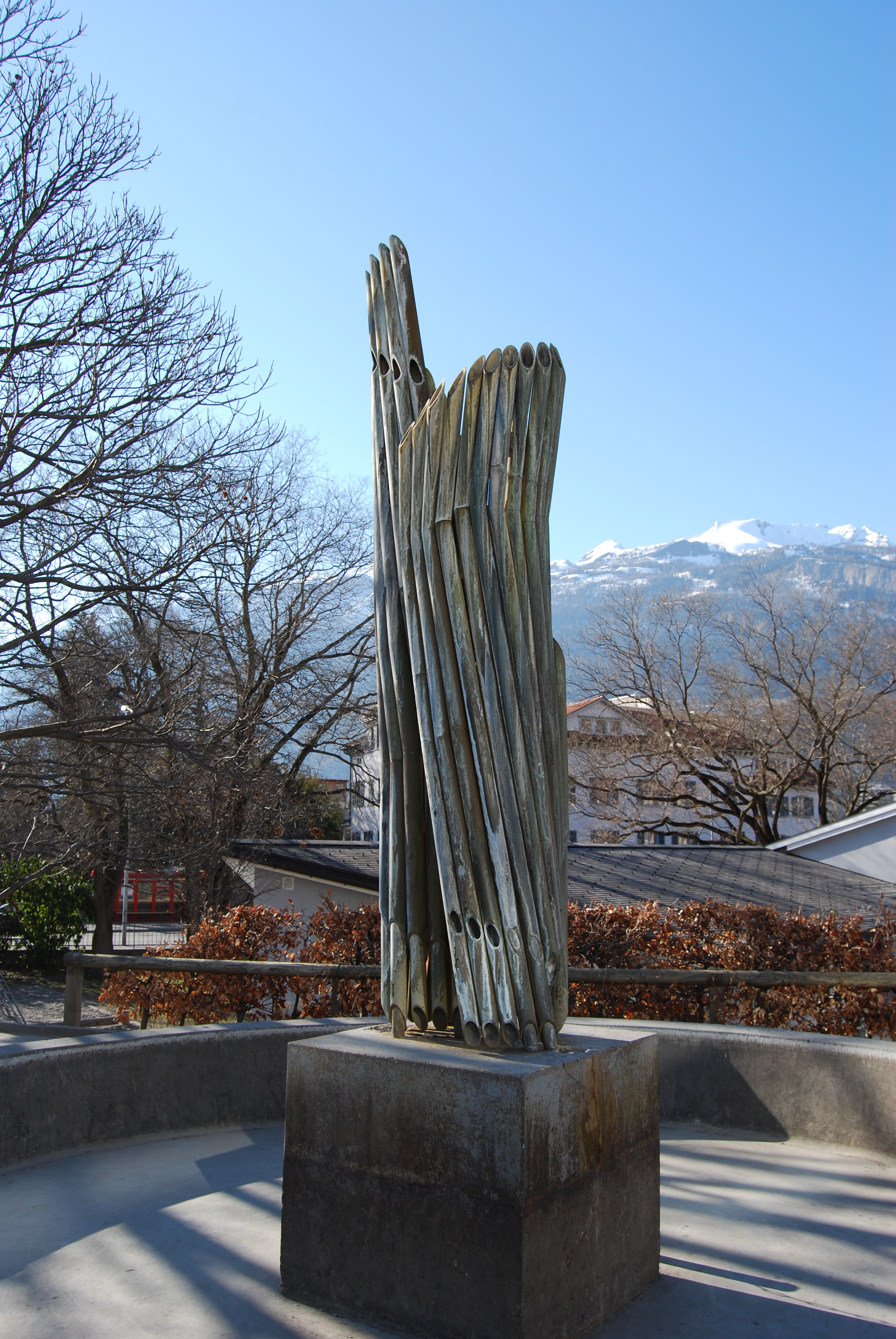
"Wasserorgel", Chur

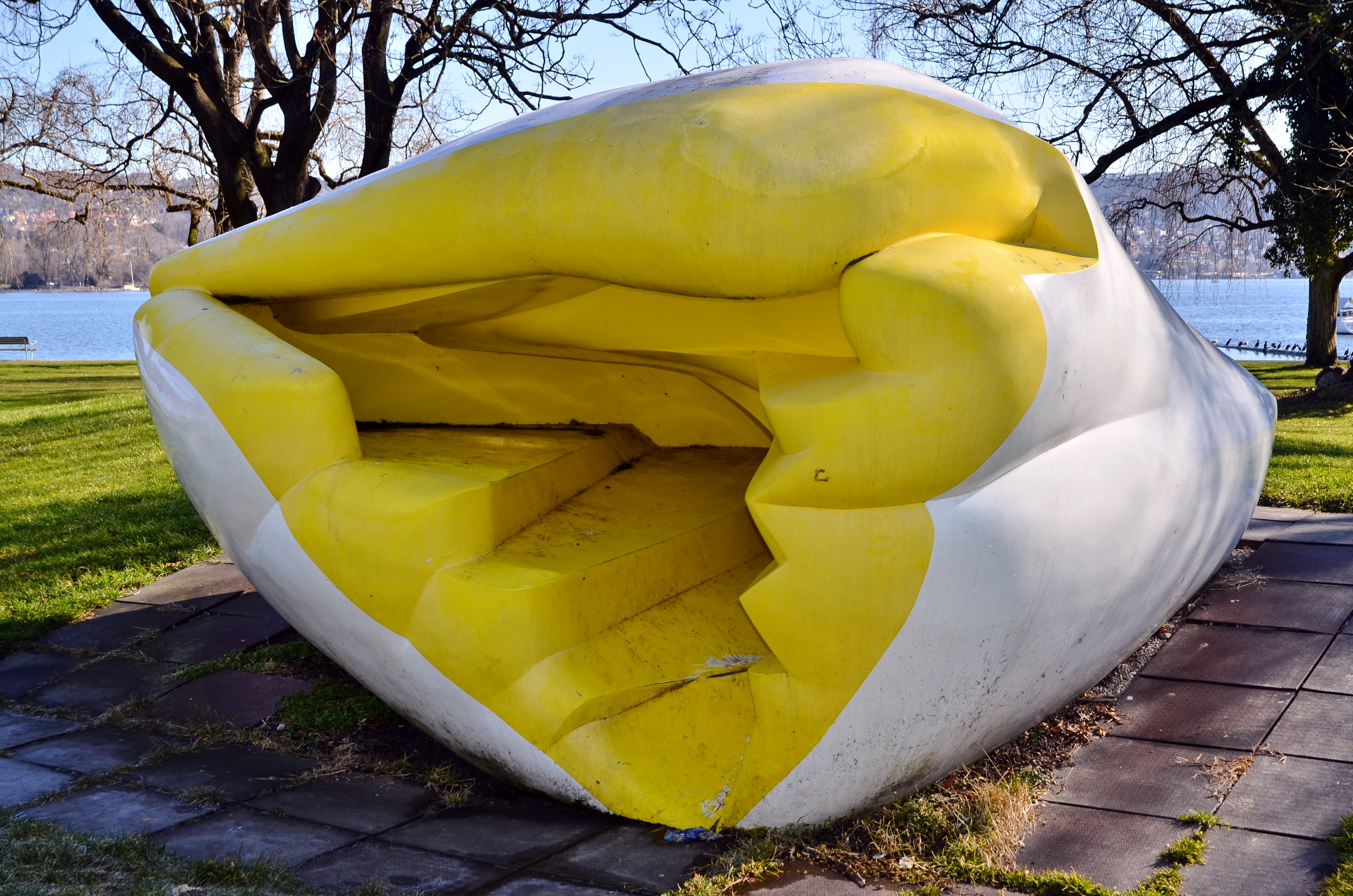
"Sitzmuschel", Strandbad Mythenquai in Zürich

- 1964 "Wasserorgel" ("Water Organ", fountain) at Montalin school, Chur
- 1969 Döltschihalde buildings, Zürich
- 1969 – 1972 "Sirius" (fountain) at Escher-Wyss-Platz, Zürich
- 1969 − 1972 "Sitzmuschel" ("Sitting Shell") at public swimming pool Mythenquai, Zürich
- 1974 "Sunrise" (sculpture) at sports field Hardhof, Zürich
- 1974 "Sitzwellen" ("Sitting Waves") at public swimming pool Zumikon
- 1980 – 1983 "Durchschritt" ("Stepthrough", sculpture) at Cantonal school Bülach
- 1995 – 1996 «Sesam-Tür und Bronzeplastik» ("Sesame Door and bronze sculpture") at Widder Hotel, Zürich

=== "Sirius" ===
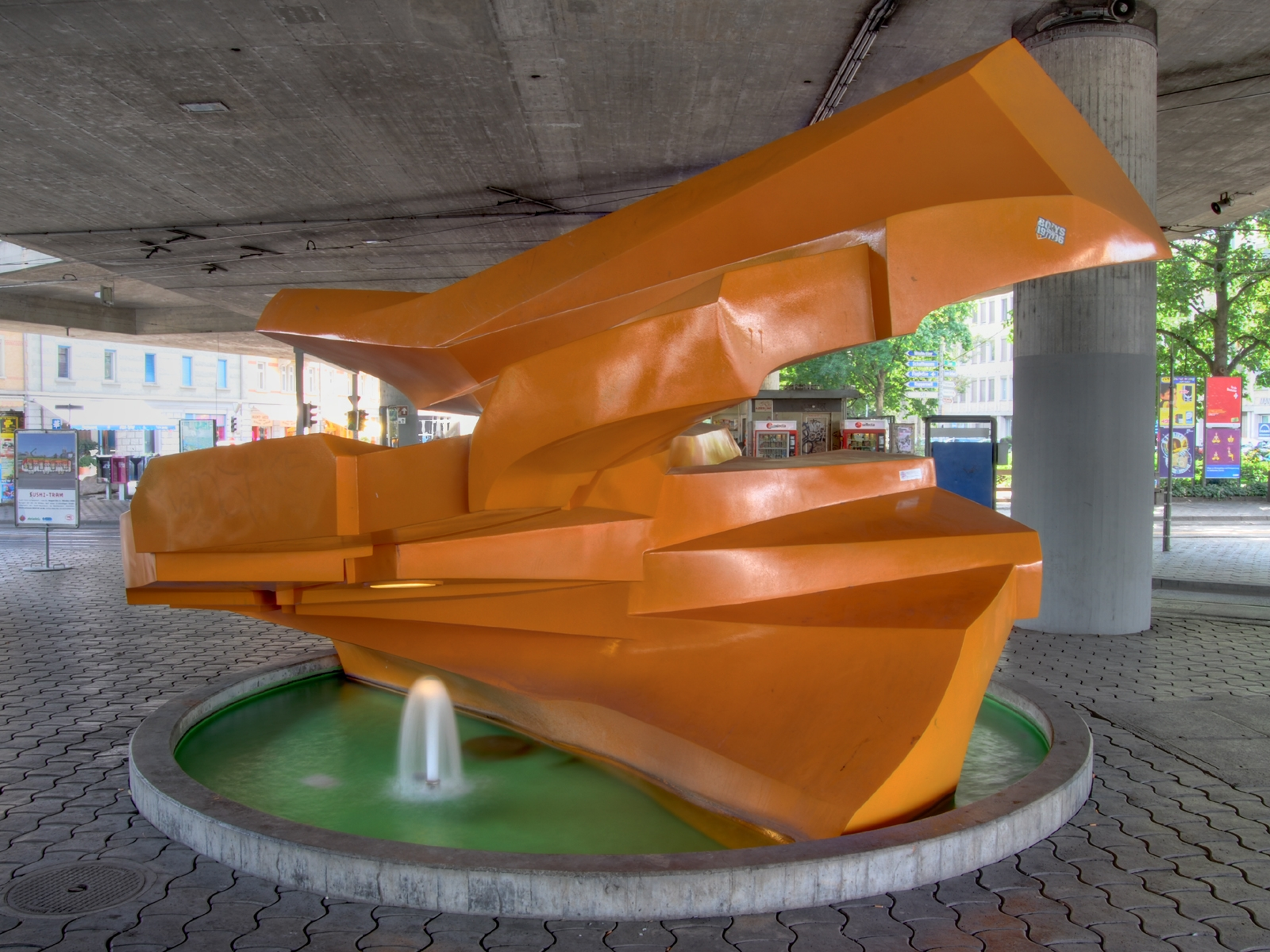
"Sirius", Zürich (relocated in December 2012)

One of Fontana's most well known works is the fountain "Sirius" which was located at Escher-Wyss-Platz in Zürich. This fountain sculpture was removed on 18 March 2009. It was constructed from 1969 to 1972, made from bright orange polyester. The sculpture, its appearance resembling two intertwined spiral staircases, was mounted in a pool with a height of just a few centimetres. The pool was painted green on the inside. As inspiration for the fountain's dynamics, Annemie Fontana filmed the opening and closing of morning glory flowers in time lapse. The concept for the fountain was modified two times. Originally, the intention was to create continuous curtains of water falling from the edges of half-open pipes embedded in the underside of the wings. At the pool's bottom there were two lights illuminating the underside of the sculpture. However, it wasn't possible to achieve the desired appearance of the water curtains and the work remained prone to malfunctions as the pipes often clogged. In 1996, the pipes were removed and as a replacement for the water curtains the pool was fitted with two small water jets, each of a height of approximately thirty centimetres. The water jets were additionally illuminated from above by lamps fitted to the sculpture. At night, the fountain was turned off.

The fountain was controversial before its construction. The suitability of the material (polyester) was put into question; administrative offices were especially concerned about durability and also expected difficulties with disposal of the sculpture, should the need arise. It was also believed that, exposed to weather, the colours would deteriorate over time. This led to the rather long delay between planning in 1969 and eventual erection in 1972.

After the installation of "Sirius", public reception was controversial, too. Max Bill is reported to have praised the fountain as the best art object in public space. Zürich's Civil Engineering Office declares it an "important witness of history and a significant, idiosyncratic work". Passers-by called it a "dismal sculpture" and a "strange seventies design".

As Escher-Wyss-Platz is being reconstructed since 9 September 2008, a new location for the fountain is needed. It is no longer included in the new design for the square. A decision regarding the new place has not been made yet; the reconstructed square at Zürich Wiedikon railway station is being evaluated as a potential location.
