= Bellevue, Switzerland =

Bellevue
- Municipality
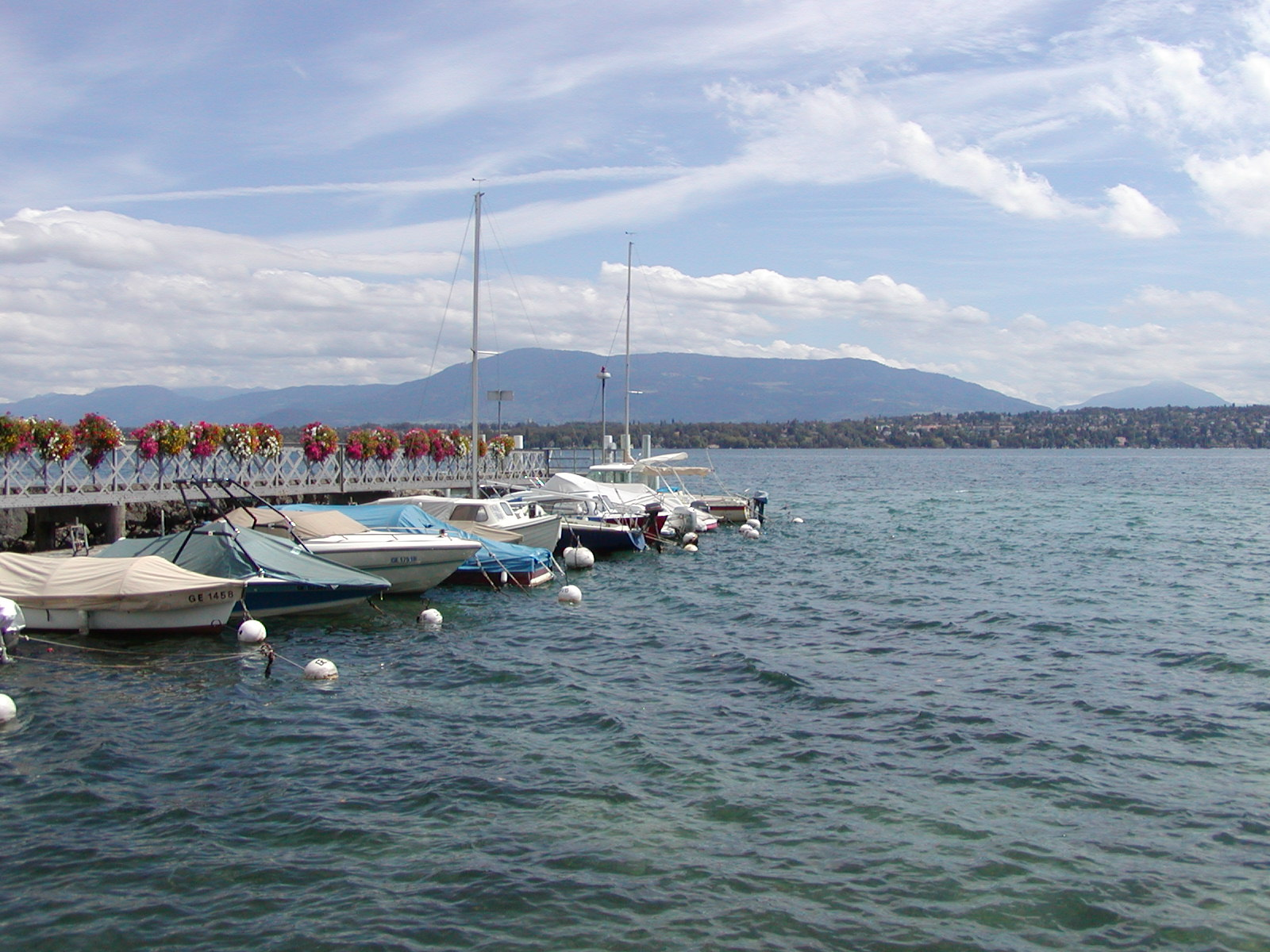

- Flag Coat of arms
- Location of Bellevue
- Location within Switzerland Location within Canton of Geneva
- Coordinates: 46°15′N 06°09′E
- Country: Switzerland
- Canton: Geneva
- District: n.a.

Government
  - Mayor: Maire; Jean-Daniel Viret

Area
  - Total: 4.35 km^{2} (1.68 sq mi)
- Elevation: 378 m (1,240 ft)

Population (December 2020)
  - Total: 3,467
  - Density: 797/km^{2} (2,060/sq mi)
- Time zone: UTC+01:00 (CET)
  - Summer (DST): UTC+02:00 (CEST)
- Postal code: 1293
- SFOS number: 6606
- ISO 3166 code: CH-GE
- Surrounded by: Collex-Bossy, Ferney-Voltaire (FR-01), Genthod, Grand-Saconnex, Pregny-Chambésy
- Website: www.mairie-bellevue.ch

Bellevue is a municipality of the Canton of Geneva, Switzerland.

== History ==
The village of Colovrex is first mentioned in 1257 as Colovray. In 1855, the municipality of Bellevue separated from the municipality of Collex-Bossy Bellevue was mostly inhabited by urban, Protestant citizens of Geneva, while the farming municipality of Collex-Bossy was mostly Catholic.

== Geography ==
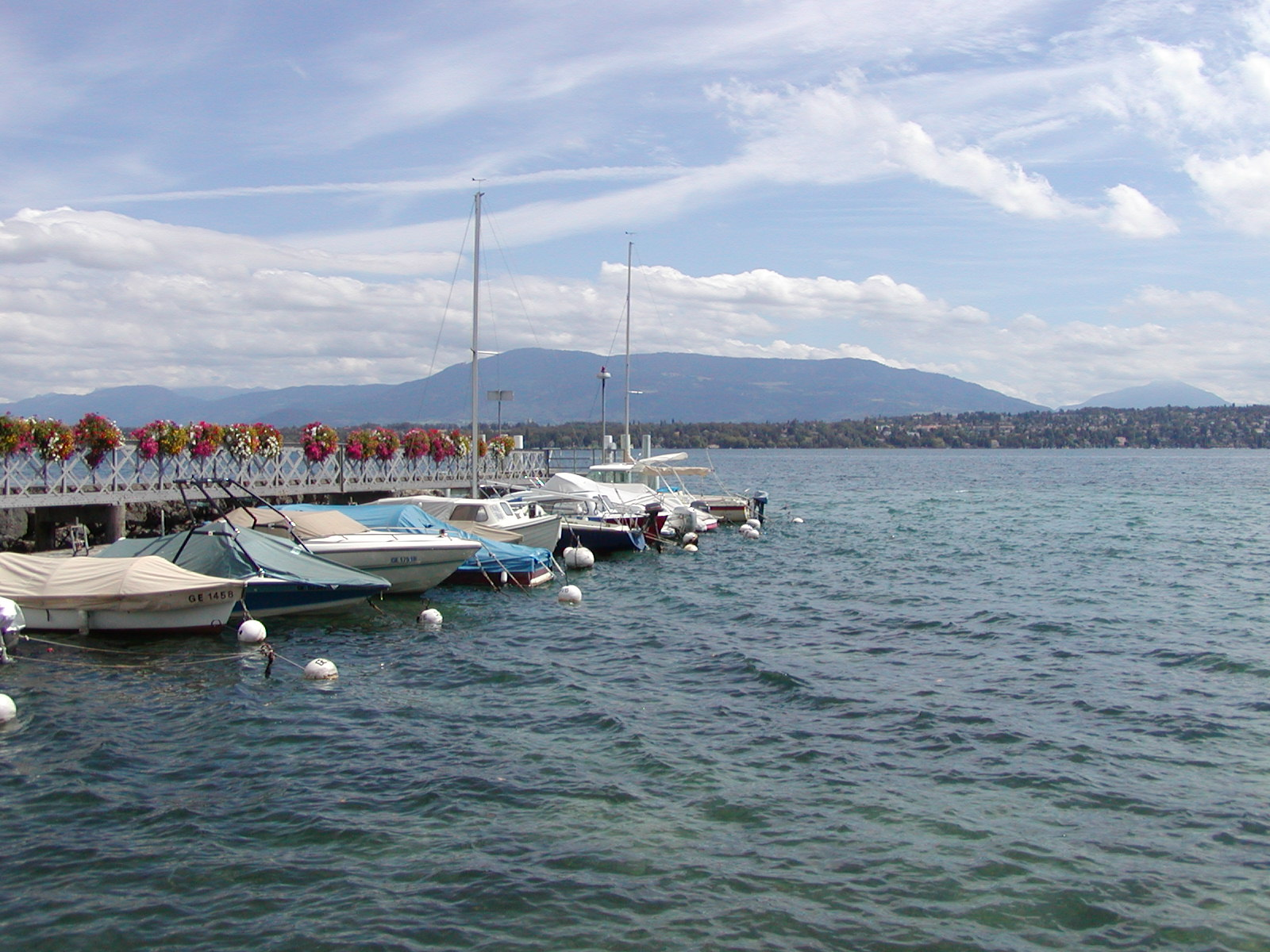
View of Lake Geneva from Bellevue

Bellevue has an area, as of 2009, of 4.35 square kilometers (1.68 sq mi). Of this area, 1.76 km^{2} (0.68 sq mi) or 40.5% is used for agricultural purposes, while 0.69 km^{2} (0.27 sq mi) or 15.9% is forested. Of the rest of the land, 1.88 km^{2} (0.73 sq mi) or 43.2% is settled (buildings or roads) and 0.06 km^{2} (15 acres) or 1.4% is unproductive land.

Of the built up area, industrial buildings made up 1.1% of the total area while housing and buildings made up 18.6% and transportation infrastructure made up 16.8%. Power and water infrastructure as well as other special developed areas made up 4.4% of the area while parks, green belts and sports fields made up 2.3%. Out of the forested land, 12.0% of the total land area is heavily forested and 3.9% is covered with orchards or small clusters of trees. Of the agricultural land, 23.0% is used for growing crops and 15.4% is pastures, while 2.1% is used for orchards or vine crops.

It is situated along the northern shores of Lake Geneva and has grown substantially within the past two decades due to the housing shortage in Geneva proper. Mainly families have moved to Bellevue. A local state school and short distances to several international schools and the airport have made it the location of choice for a high share of expatriates.

It consists of the village of Bellevue and the hamlets of Vengeron, Les Tuileries, Valavran and Colovrex.

The municipality of Bellevue consists of the sub-sections or villages of Le Gobé, Bellevue - Grands-Bois, Les Grands-Champs, Bellevue - Rives-du-Lac and L'Ermitage.

== Demographics ==
Bellevue has a population (as of December 2020) of 3,467. As of 2008, 39.8% of the population are resident foreign nationals. Over the last 10 years (1999–2009 ) the population has changed at a rate of 75.9%. It has changed at a rate of 60.3% due to migration and at a rate of 16.2% due to births and deaths.

Most of the population (as of 2000) speaks French (1,210 or 67.2%), with English being second most common (263 or 14.6%) and German being third (93 or 5.2%). There is 1 person who speaks Romansh.

As of 2008, the gender distribution of the population was 49.1% male and 50.9% female. The population was made up of 923 Swiss men (28.8% of the population) and 651 (20.3%) non-Swiss men. There were 1,010 Swiss women (31.5%) and 620 (19.4%) non-Swiss women. Of the population in the municipality 223 or about 12.4% were born in Bellevue and lived there in 2000. There were 406 or 22.5% who were born in the same canton, while 257 or 14.3% were born somewhere else in Switzerland, and 661 or 36.7% were born outside of Switzerland.

In 2008 there were 33 live births to Swiss citizens and 10 births to non-Swiss citizens, and in same time span there were 8 deaths of Swiss citizens and 3 non-Swiss citizen deaths. Ignoring immigration and emigration, the population of Swiss citizens increased by 25 while the foreign population increased by 7. There were 10 Swiss men and 3 Swiss women who emigrated from Switzerland. At the same time, there were 28 non-Swiss men and 24 non-Swiss women who immigrated from another country to Switzerland. The total Swiss population change in 2008 (from all sources, including moves across municipal borders) was an increase of 117 and the non-Swiss population increased by 68 people. This represents a population growth rate of 6.2%. The age distribution of the population (as of 2000) is children and teenagers (0–19 years old) make up 28.8% of the population, while adults (20–64 years old) make up 63.5% and seniors (over 64 years old) make up 7.7%.

As of 2000, there were 786 people who were single and never married in the municipality. There were 892 married individuals, 42 widows or widowers and 81 individuals who are divorced.

As of 2000, there were 561 private households in the municipality, and an average of 2.8 persons per household. There were 129 households that consist of only one person and 61 households with five or more people. Out of a total of 597 households that answered this question, 21.6% were households made up of just one person and there were 4 adults who lived with their parents. Of the rest of the households, there are 133 married couples without children, 254 married couples with children There were 39 single parents with a child or children. There were 2 households that were made up of unrelated people and 36 households that were made up of some sort of institution or another collective housing.

In 2000 there were 381 single family homes (or 79.4% of the total) out of a total of 480 inhabited buildings. There were 42 multi-family buildings (8.8%), along with 31 multi-purpose buildings that were mostly used for housing (6.5%) and 26 other use buildings (commercial or industrial) that also had some housing (5.4%). Of the single family homes 34 were built before 1919, while 34 were built between 1990 and 2000. The greatest number of single family homes (141) were built between 1981 and 1990.

In 2000 there were 610 apartments in the municipality. The most common apartment size was 5 rooms of which there were 183. There were 53 single room apartments and 318 apartments with five or more rooms. Of these apartments, a total of 536 apartments (87.9% of the total) were permanently occupied, while 65 apartments (10.7%) were seasonally occupied and 9 apartments (1.5%) were empty. As of 2009, the construction rate of new housing units was 0 new units per 1000 residents. The vacancy rate for the municipality, in 2010, was 0.18%.

The historical population is given in the following chart:

== Politics ==
In the 2007 federal election the most popular party was the SVP which received 23.08% of the vote. The next three most popular parties were the LPS Party (17.01%), the SP (16.63%) and the Green Party (14.78%). In the federal election, a total of 595 votes were cast, and the voter turnout was 46.6%.

In the 2009 Grand Conseil election, there were a total of 1,388 registered voters of which 542 (39.0%) voted. The most popular party in the municipality for this election was the Libéral with 24.7% of the ballots. In the canton-wide election they received the highest proportion of votes. The second most popular party was the Les Verts (with 13.7%), they were also second in the canton-wide election, while the third most popular party was the Les Socialistes (with 11.9%), they were fourth in the canton-wide election.

For the 2009 Conseil d'État election, there were a total of 1,387 registered voters of which 636 (45.9%) voted.

In 2011, all the municipalities held local elections, and in Bellevue there were 19 spots open on the municipal council. There were a total of 1,791 registered voters of which 760 (42.4%) voted. Out of the 760 votes, there were 7 blank votes, 15 null or unreadable votes and 79 votes with a name that was not on the list.

== Economy ==
Bellevue is home to the recently (2006) opened headquarters of luxury brand conglomerate Richemont and Webster University Geneva (since 1983).

As of 2010, Bellevue had an unemployment rate of 8.6%. As of 2008, there were 8 people employed in the primary economic sector and about 5 businesses involved in this sector. 128 people were employed in the secondary sector and there were 18 businesses in this sector. 1,062 people were employed in the tertiary sector, with 74 businesses in this sector. There were 908 residents of the municipality who were employed in some capacity, of which females made up 45.2% of the workforce.

In 2008 the total number of full-time equivalent jobs was 1,063. The number of jobs in the primary sector was 7, all of which were in agriculture. The number of jobs in the secondary sector was 123 of which 5 or (4.1%) were in manufacturing and 119 (96.7%) were in construction. The number of jobs in the tertiary sector was 933. In the tertiary sector; 92 or 9.9% were in wholesale or retail sales or the repair of motor vehicles, 12 or 1.3% were in the movement and storage of goods, 304 or 32.6% were in a hotel or restaurant, 7 or 0.8% were in the information industry, 7 or 0.8% were the insurance or financial industry, 357 or 38.3% were technical professionals or scientists, 65 or 7.0% were in education and 19 or 2.0% were in health care.

In 2000, there were 527 workers who commuted into the municipality and 748 workers who commuted away. The municipality is a net exporter of workers, with about 1.4 workers leaving the municipality for every one entering. About 13.3% of the workforce coming into Bellevue are coming from outside Switzerland, while 0.0% of the locals commute out of Switzerland for work. Of the working population, 15.3% used public transportation to get to work, and 68.1% used a private car.

== Religion ==
From the 2000 census, 552 or 30.6% were Roman Catholic, while 348 or 19.3% belonged to the Swiss Reformed Church. Of the rest of the population, there were 30 members of an Orthodox church (or about 1.67% of the population), and there were 40 individuals (or about 2.22% of the population) who belonged to another Christian church. There were 16 individuals (or about 0.89% of the population) who were Jewish, and 50 (or about 2.78% of the population) who were Islamic. There were 3 individuals who were Buddhist, 5 individuals who were Hindu and 2 individuals who belonged to another church. 411 (or about 22.82% of the population) belonged to no church, are agnostic or atheist, and 344 individuals (or about 19.10% of the population) did not answer the question.

== Education ==
In Bellevue about 414 or (23.0%) of the population have completed non-mandatory upper secondary education, and 480 or (26.7%) have completed additional higher education (either university or a Fachhochschule). Of the 480 who completed tertiary schooling, 32.5% were Swiss men, 25.2% were Swiss women, 23.1% were non-Swiss men and 19.2% were non-Swiss women.

During the 2009-2010 school year there were a total of 711 students in the Bellevue school system. The education system in the Canton of Geneva allows young children to attend two years of non-obligatory Kindergarten. During that school year, there were 71 children who were in a pre-kindergarten class. The canton's school system provides two years of non-mandatory kindergarten and requires students to attend six years of primary school, with some of the children attending smaller, specialized classes. In Bellevue there were 105 students in kindergarten or primary school and 9 students were in the special, smaller classes. The secondary school program consists of three lower, obligatory years of schooling, followed by three to five years of optional, advanced schools. There were 105 lower secondary students who attended school in Bellevue. There were 130 upper secondary students from the municipality along with 12 students who were in a professional, non-university track program. An additional 86 students attended a private school.

As of 2000, there were 205 students in Bellevue who came from another municipality, while 303 residents attended schools outside the municipality.
