= Versoix =

Versoix Versoix, Varchoè (Arpitan) Versoix (French)
- Municipality
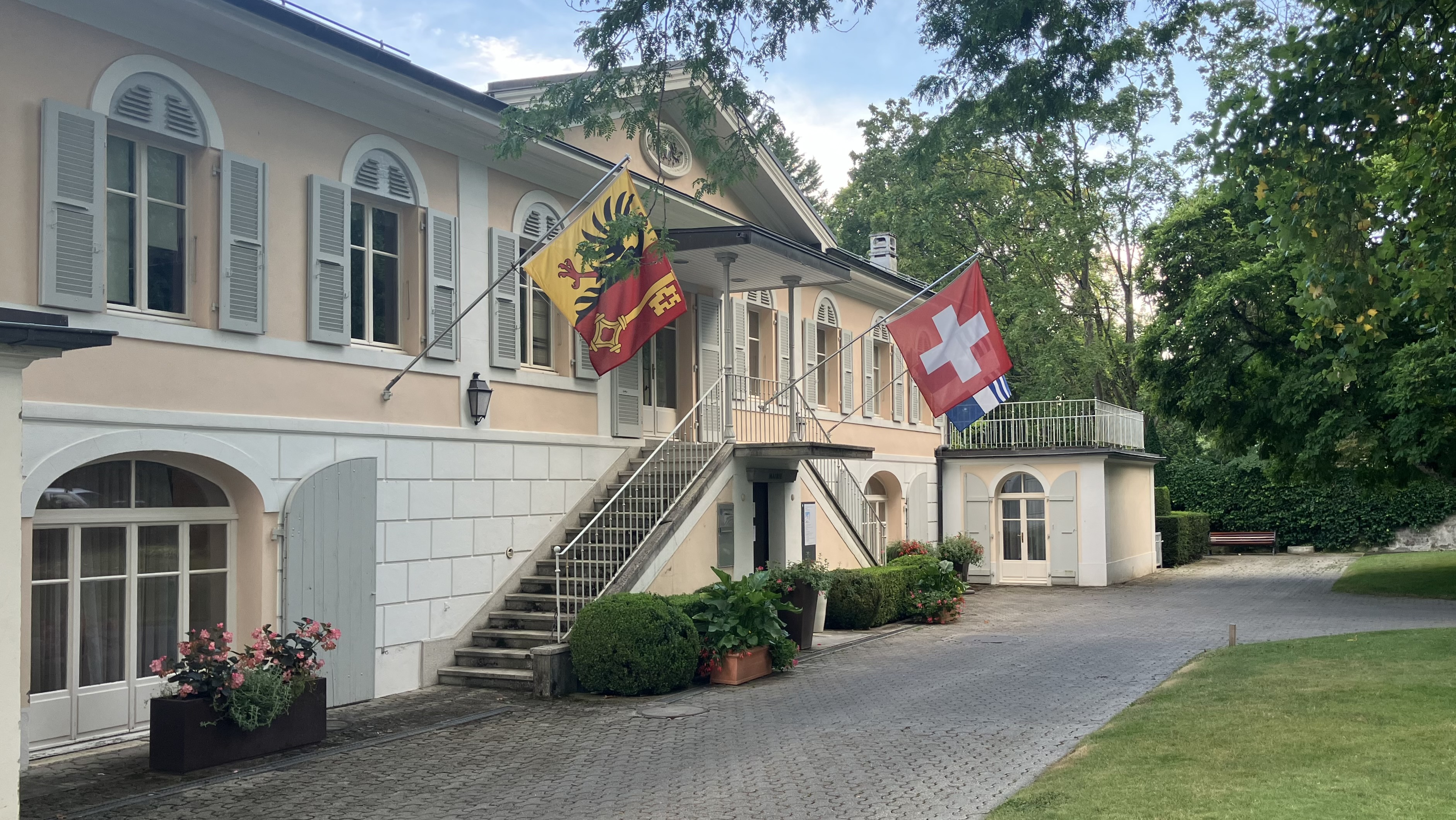
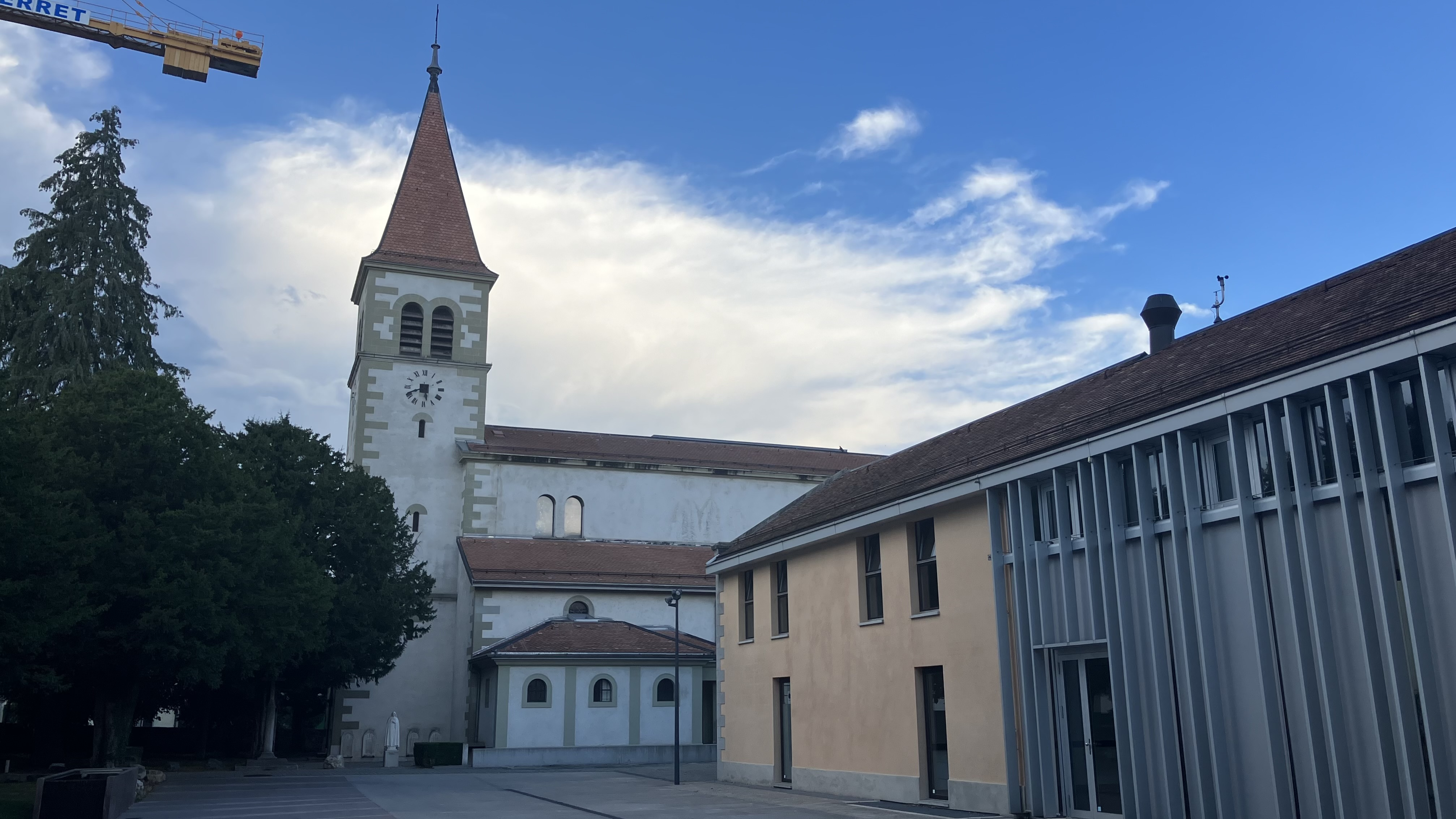
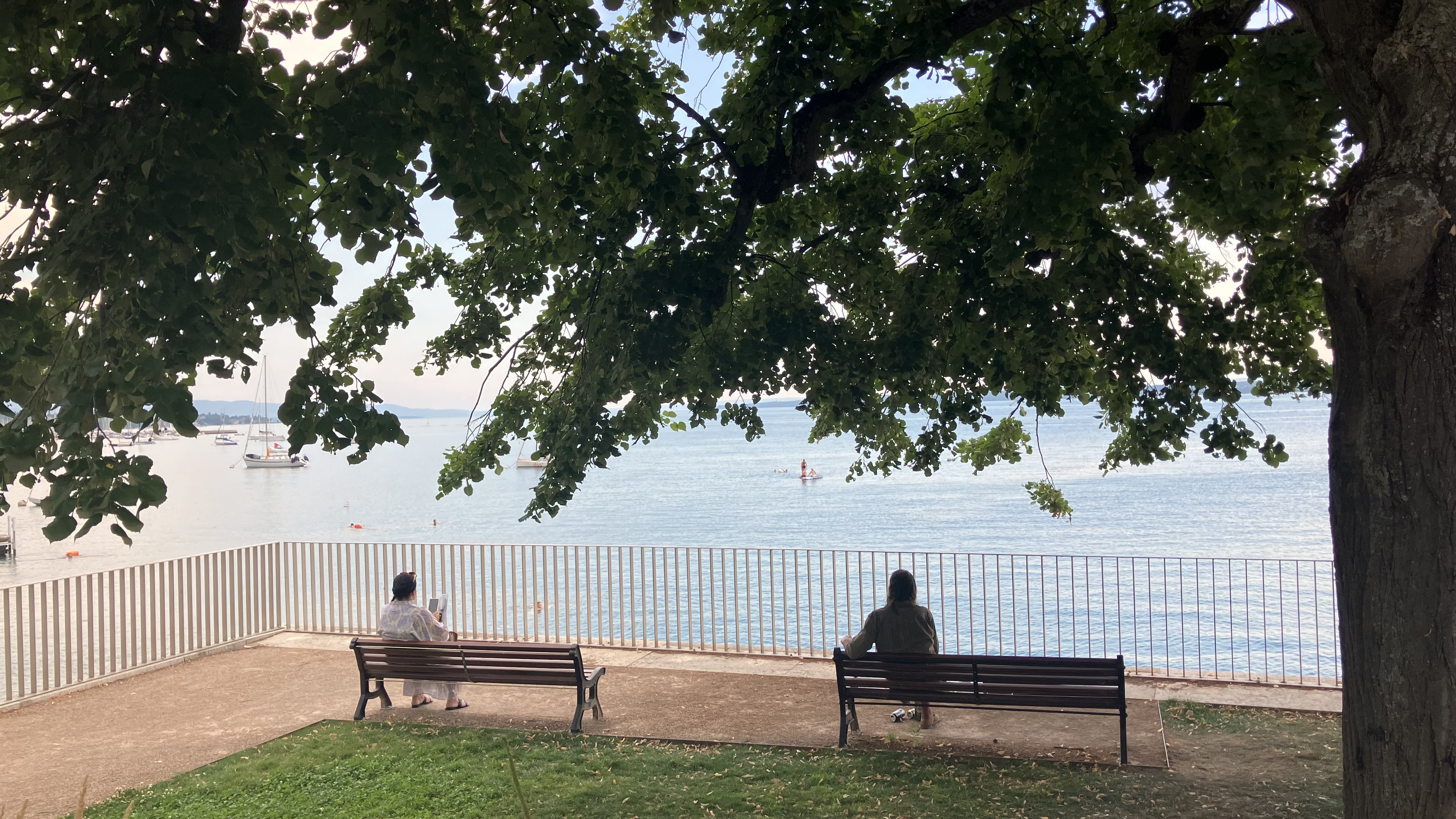
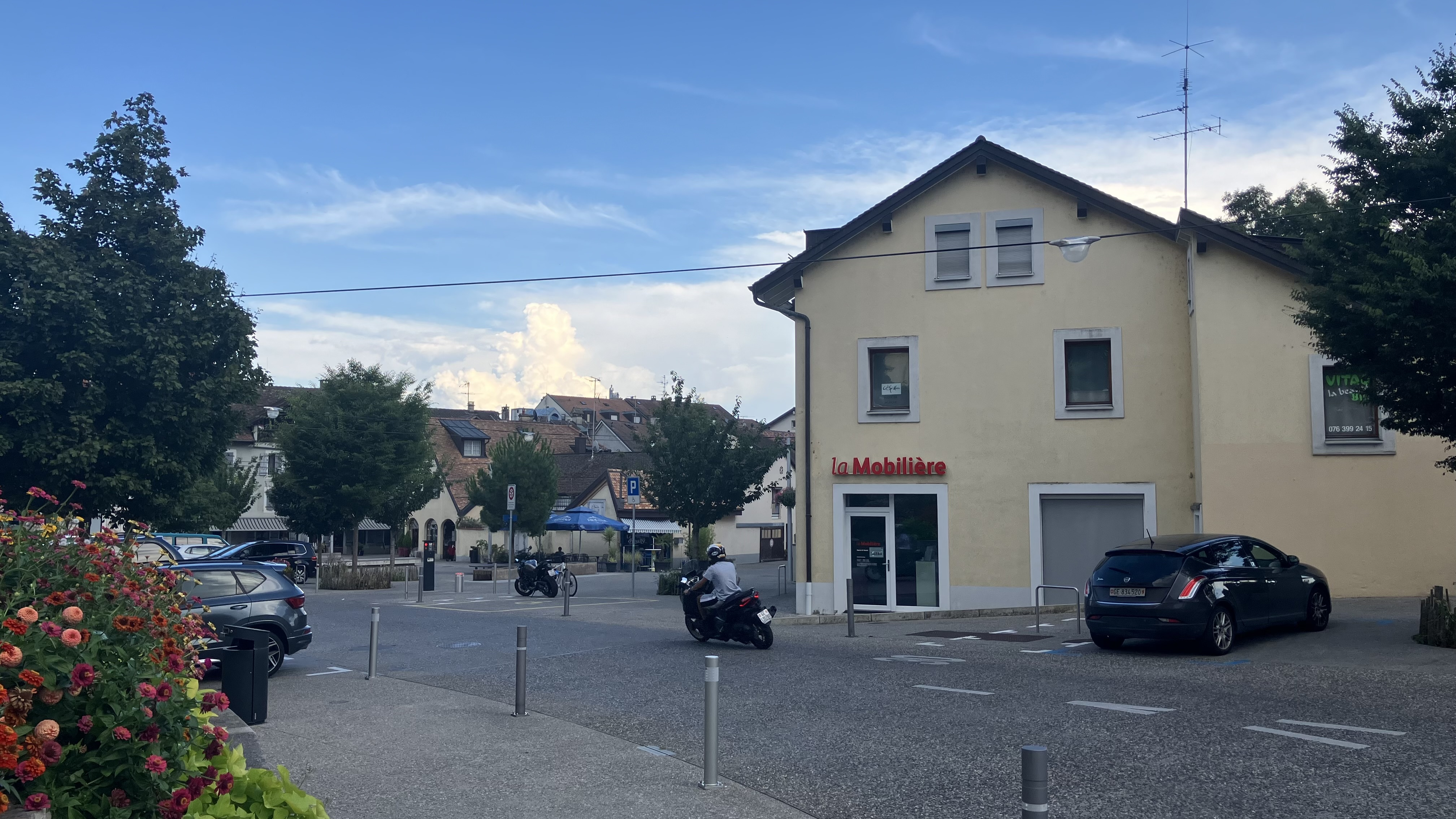
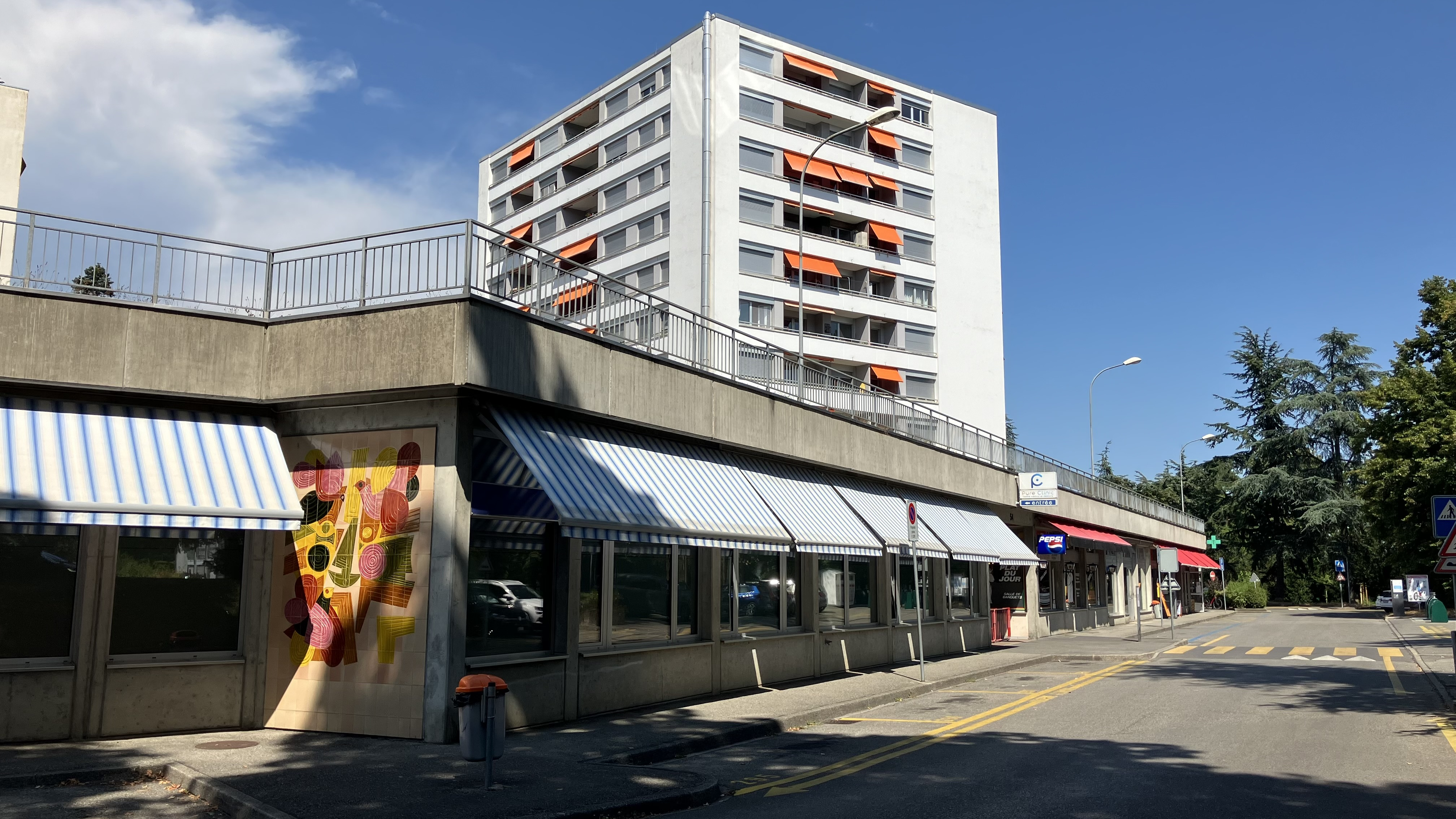
- Clockwise from top : Town Hall, Lake Geneva, Versoix-la-Ville, Versoix-Bourg, Catholic Church

- Flag Coat of arms
- Location of Versoix; Versoix, Varchoè (Arpitan); Versoix (French)
- Location within Switzerland Location within Canton of Geneva
- Coordinates: 46°17′N 06°10′E
- Country: Switzerland
- Canton: Geneva
- District: n.a.

Government
  - Mayor: Maire; Jolanka Tchamkerten Les Verts

Area
  - Total: 10.51 km^{2} (4.06 sq mi)
- Elevation: 385 m (1,263 ft)

Population (December 2020)
  - Total: 13,281
  - Density: 1,264/km^{2} (3,273/sq mi)
- Time zone: UTC+01:00 (CET)
  - Summer (DST): UTC+02:00 (CEST)
- Postal code: 1290
- SFOS number: 6644
- ISO 3166 code: CH-GE
- Surrounded by: Mies, Chavannes-des-Bois, Grilly, Sauverny, Versonnex, Collex-Bossy, Genthod
- Website: www.versoix.ch

Versoix (French pronunciation: [vɛʁ.swa]; local Arpitan dialect: Varchoè) is a municipality in the Canton of Geneva, in Switzerland. It is located in the northern suburbs of Geneva.

== Toponymy ==
The name of the commune is of uncertain origin. It could be composed of the Proto-Indo-European base *uer- ("water, river"), the infix -s-, and suffix -ogia. It is first attested from c. 1026 to 1031, in the Medieval Latin form Uersoi. Its name in Genevan patois is Varchoè. The commune is nicknamed "the Crow's Nest".

== Geography ==
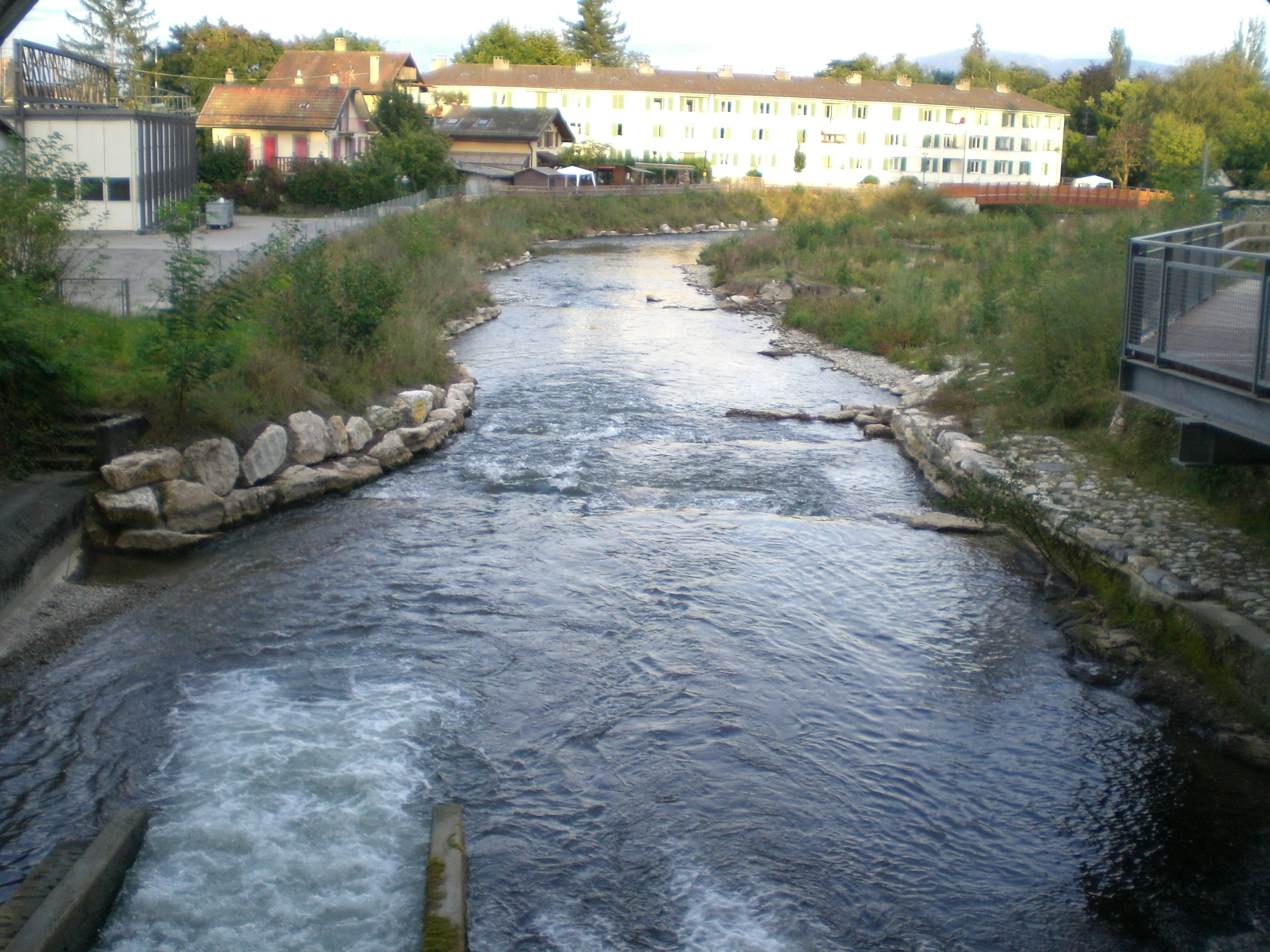
Versoix river at Versoix, 2007

Aerial view from 100 m by Walter Mittelholzer (1925)

Versoix has an area, as of 2009, of 10.51 square kilometers (4.06 sq mi). Of this area, 3.06 km^{2} (1.18 sq mi) or 29.1% is used for agricultural purposes, while 4 km^{2} (1.5 sq mi) or 38.1% is forested. Of the rest of the land, 3.4 km^{2} (1.3 sq mi) or 32.4% is settled (buildings or roads), 0.08 km^{2} (20 acres) or 0.8% is either rivers or lakes and 0.01 km^{2} (2.5 acres) or 0.1% is unproductive land.

Of the built up area, housing and buildings made up 19.4% and transportation infrastructure made up 8.7%. while parks, green belts and sports fields made up 2.8%. Out of the forested land, 36.1% of the total land area is heavily forested and 2.0% is covered with orchards or small clusters of trees. Of the agricultural land, 23.1% is used for growing crops and 3.5% is pastures, while 2.5% is used for orchards or vine crops. Of the water in the municipality, 0.4% is in lakes and 0.4% is in rivers and streams.

The municipality of Versoix consists of the sub-sections or villages of Richelien, Creuson, Sauverny, Petit-Saint-Loup, Ecogia, Versoix-la-Ville, Pont-Céard, Port-Choiseul, Versoix-Bourg, Versoix-lac, Crève-Cœur.

It is the last town of the Canton of Geneva on the road northeast towards Lausanne, before the Canton of Vaud starts. It is a train stop on the Swiss Federal Railways line running between Coppet and Geneva. On the Vaud side, the next village is called Mies.

The distance from the centre of Geneva is about 10 km, and it takes around 15 minutes by train or car to get into downtown.

== Demographics ==
Versoix has a population (as of December 2020) of 13,281. As of 2008, 41.7% of the population are resident foreign nationals. Over the last 10 years (1999–2009) the population has changed at a rate of 23.3%. It has changed at a rate of 19% due to migration and at a rate of 5.8% due to births and deaths.

Most of the population (as of 2000) speaks French (7,611 or 73.8%), with English being second most common (738 or 7.2%) and German being third (415 or 4.0%). There are 281 people who speak Italian and 3 people who speak Romansh.

As of 2008, the gender distribution of the population was 48.3% male and 51.7% female. The population was made up of 3,465 Swiss men (26.6% of the population) and 2,831 (21.7%) non-Swiss men. There were 4,013 Swiss women (30.8%) and 2,713 (20.8%) non-Swiss women. Of the population in the municipality 1,979 or about 19.2% were born in Versoix and lived there in 2000. There were 1,978 or 19.2% who were born in the same canton, while 1,603 or 15.5% were born somewhere else in Switzerland, and 4,052 or 39.3% were born outside of Switzerland.

In 2008 there were 75 live births to Swiss citizens and 54 births to non-Swiss citizens, and in same time span there were 57 deaths of Swiss citizens and 10 non-Swiss citizen deaths. Ignoring immigration and emigration, the population of Swiss citizens increased by 18 while the foreign population increased by 44. There were 39 Swiss men and 40 Swiss women who emigrated from Switzerland. At the same time, there were 124 non-Swiss men and 94 non-Swiss women who immigrated from another country to Switzerland. The total Swiss population change in 2008 (from all sources, including moves across municipal borders) was an increase of 56 and the non-Swiss population increased by 211 people. This represents a population growth rate of 2.2%.

The age distribution of the population (as of 2000) is children and teenagers (0–19 years old) make up 28.3% of the population, while adults (20–64 years old) make up 60.5% and seniors (over 64 years old) make up 11.2%.

As of 2000, there were 4,482 people who were single and never married in the municipality. There were 4,717 married individuals, 421 widows or widowers and 689 individuals who are divorced.

As of 2000, there were 3,977 private households in the municipality, and an average of 2.4 persons per household. There were 1,282 households that consist of only one person and 296 households with five or more people. Out of a total of 4,089 households that answered this question, 31.4% were households made up of just one person and there were 28 adults who lived with their parents. Of the rest of the households, there are 906 married couples without children, 1,323 married couples with children There were 384 single parents with a child or children. There were 54 households that were made up of unrelated people and 112 households that were made up of some sort of institution or another collective housing.

In 2000 there were 671 single family homes (or 56.9% of the total) out of a total of 1,179 inhabited buildings. There were 243 multi-family buildings (20.6%), along with 201 multi-purpose buildings that were mostly used for housing (17.0%) and 64 other use buildings (commercial or industrial) that also had some housing (5.4%). Of the single family homes 113 were built before 1919, while 90 were built between 1990 and 2000. The greatest number of single family homes (138) were built between 1981 and 1990. The most multi-family homes (46) were built before 1919 and the next most (39) were built between 1991 and 1995. There were 19 multi-family houses built between 1996 and 2000.

In 2000 there were 4,536 apartments in the municipality. The most common apartment size was 3 rooms of which there were 1,406. There were 293 single room apartments and 991 apartments with five or more rooms. Of these apartments, a total of 3,734 apartments (82.3% of the total) were permanently occupied, while 676 apartments (14.9%) were seasonally occupied and 126 apartments (2.8%) were empty. As of 2009, the construction rate of new housing units was 6.1 new units per 1000 residents. The vacancy rate for the municipality, in 2010, was 0.12%.

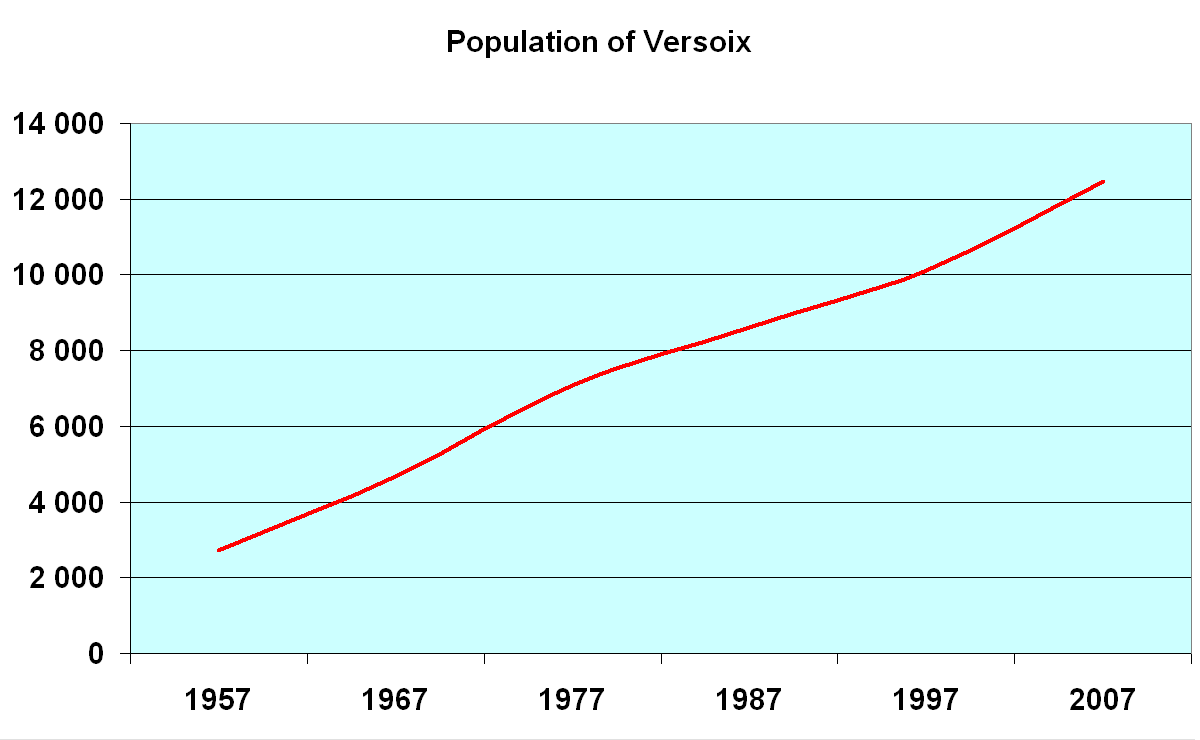
Population of Versoix from 1957 to 2007.

The historical population is given in the following chart:

== Heritage sites of national significance ==
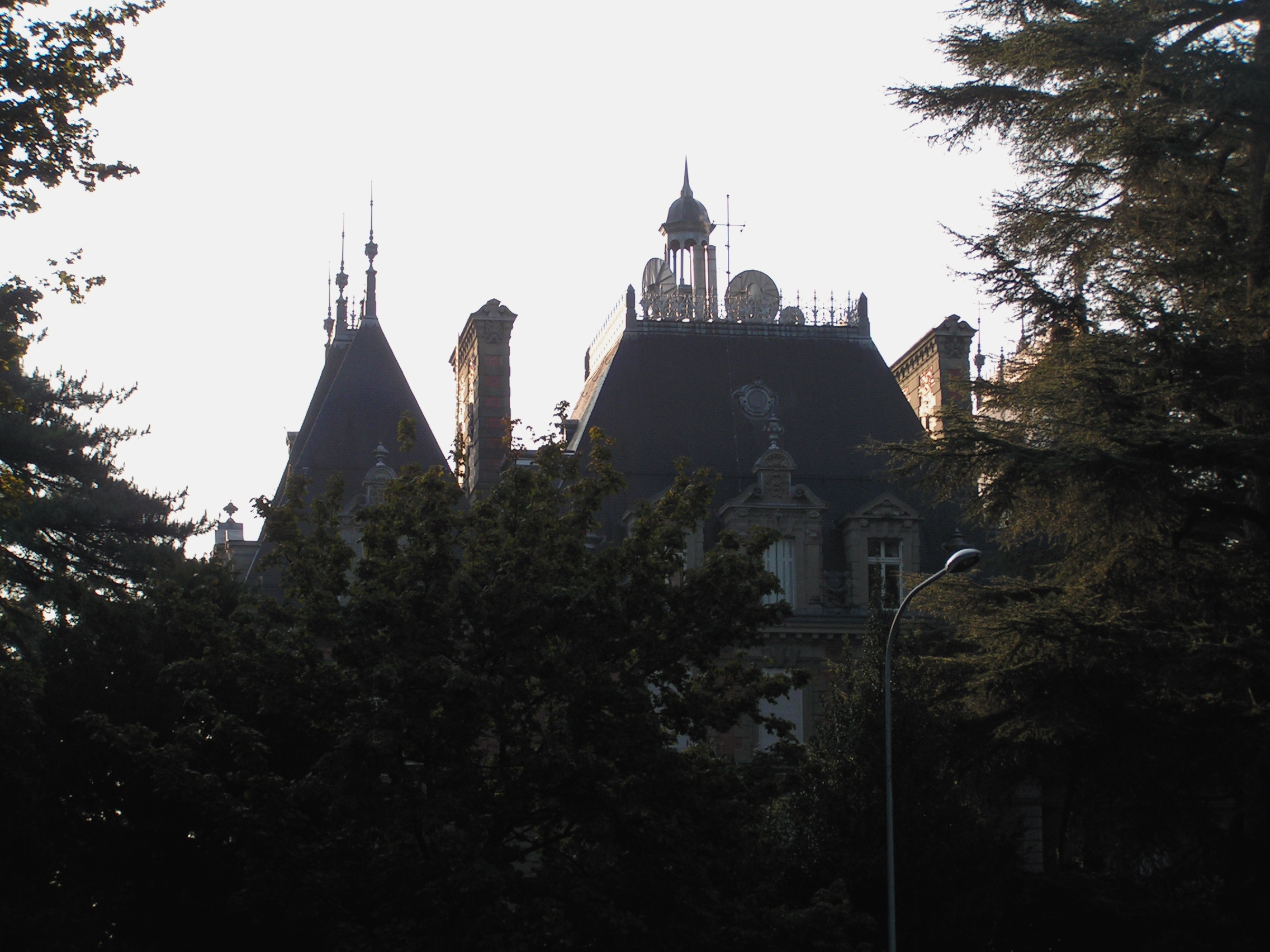
Roof of Villa Bartholony

The Bourg, a Bronze Age littoral settlement, and the Villa Bartholony (Sans Souci) are listed as Swiss heritage site of national significance. The Bourg settlement is part of the Prehistoric Pile dwellings around the Alps a UNESCO World Heritage Site.

== Sights ==
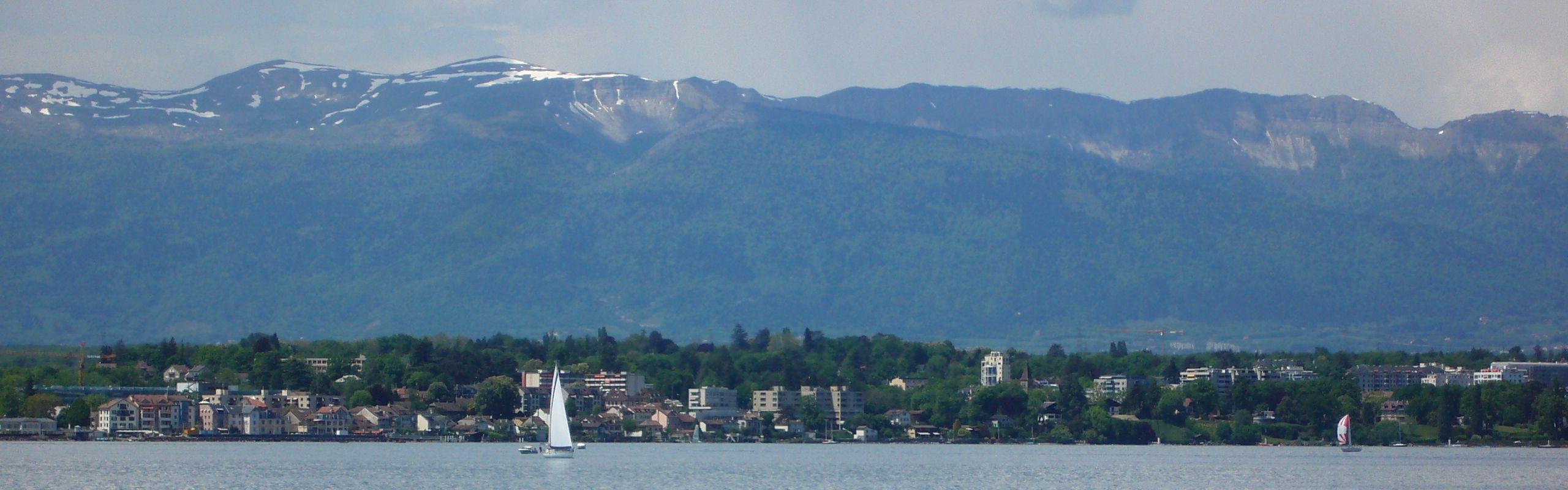
Versoix as seen from Lake Geneva, 2008

It is the hub for many humanitarian organizations and other organizations within the environmental, science, and technology fields. The University of Geneva has part of its campus, in particular the department of astronomy and its observatory, in Versoix, while the International Committee of the Red Cross maintains a training center there. Versoix has its official music band, the "Musique Municipale de Versoix", which also provides a music school. Versoix is also known for the impressive ice formations, or icicles, which can be seen mainly in the coast line during the winter.

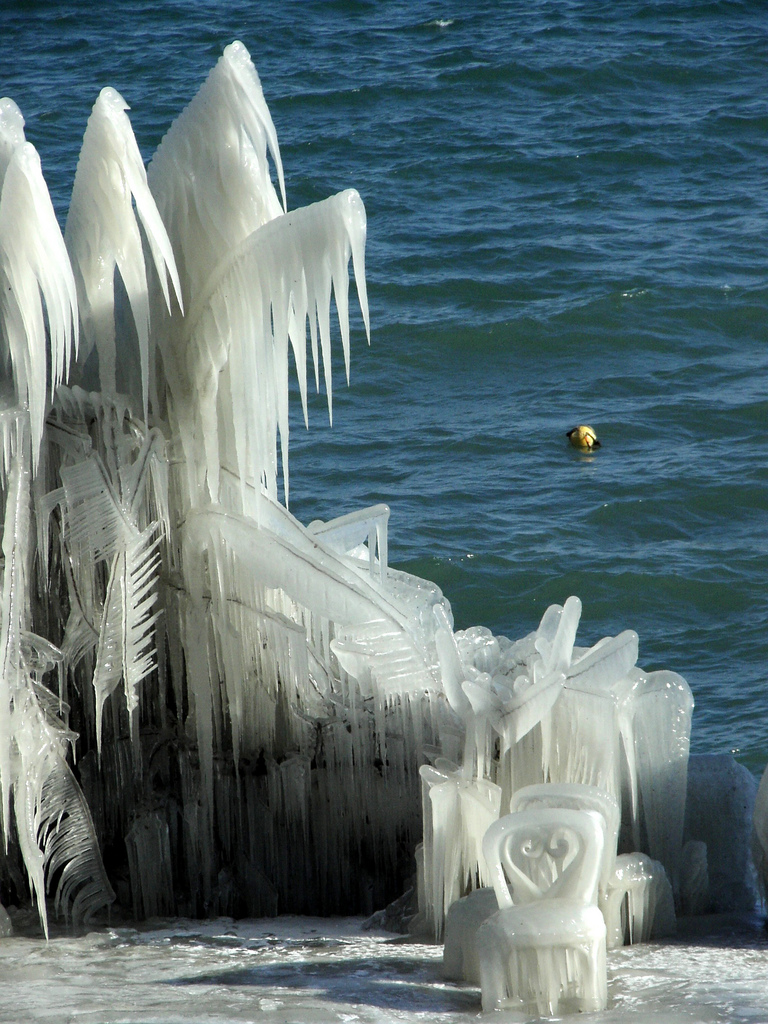
Ice formations next to the lake

== Chocolate ==
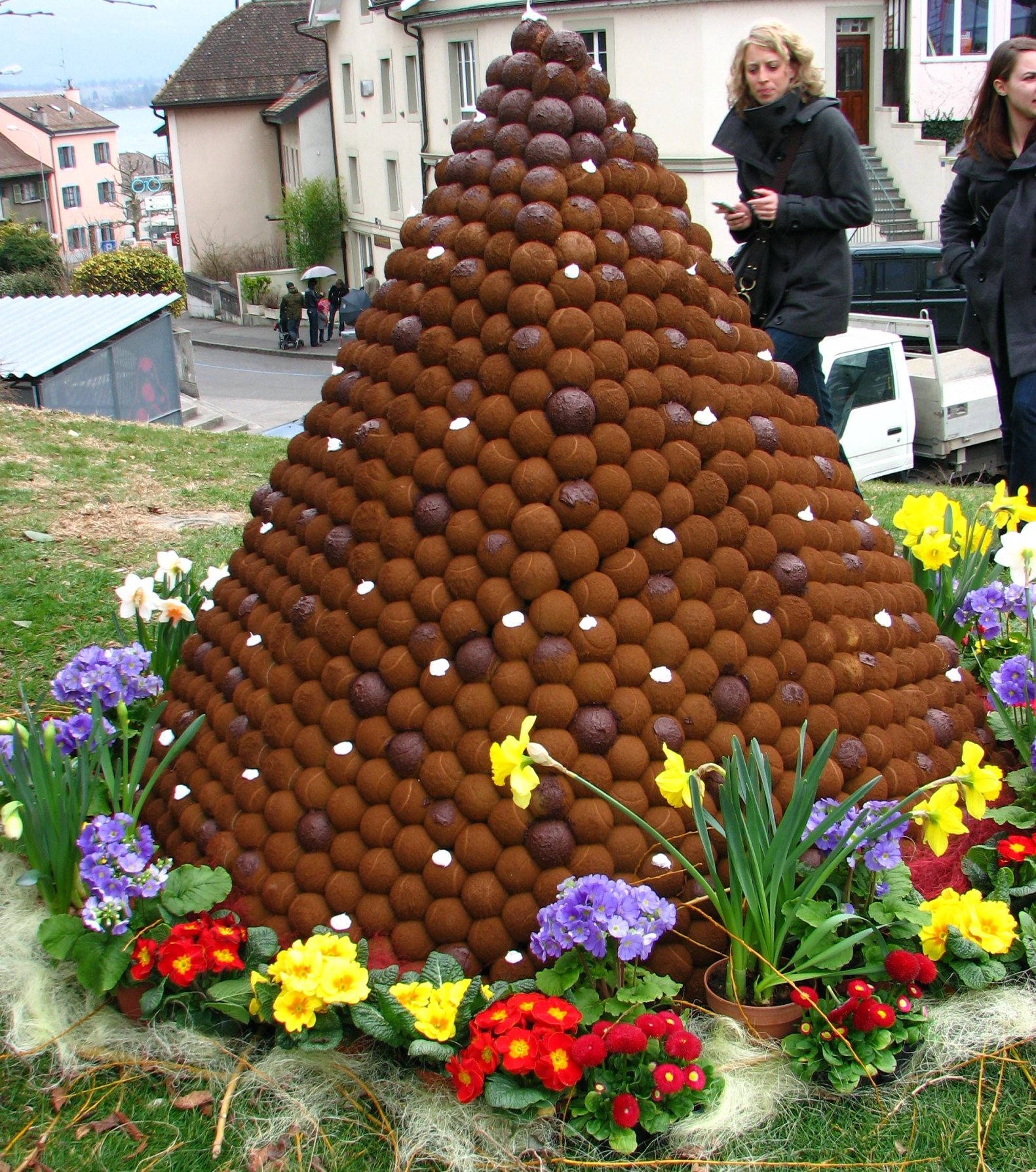
A display at the Chocolate Festival, 2010

The Swiss chocolate manufacturer Favarger has its headquarters and factory in Versoix. Since 2004, Versoix has organized a chocolate festival. At this festival you can taste various artisan chocolates and visit the Favarger chocolate factory. Festival activities include treasure hunts.

== Hobbies and sports ==
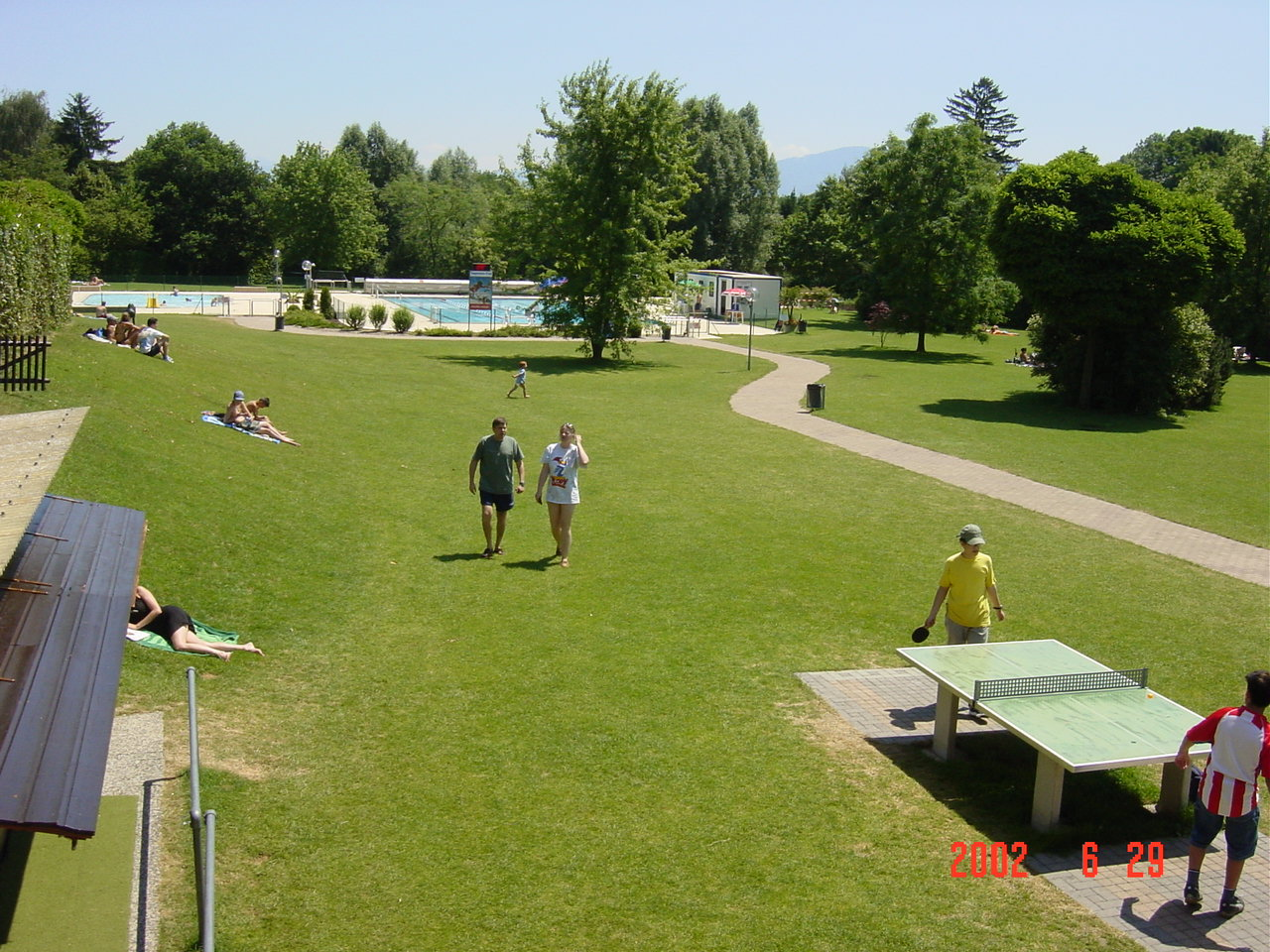
Versoix sports center, 2002

There is one sports center in Versoix, La Bécassière. It contains two pools, soccer fields, basketball courts and a beach-volleyball court. The pool in Versoix consists of two outdoor pools, a snack-bar, a restaurant with a terrace and a playground.

Versoix has a Parcours VITA-FUITE of 2.4 km (1.5 mi), in the Versoix woods.

=== Sports clubs ===
- Le football club Versoix (FC Versoix)
- Le club de basket Versoix (Versoix Basket)
- Le badminton club Versoix ( BCV)
- Le judo, ju-jutsu club Versoix (JCV)
- Le tennis club Versoix (TCV)
- Le club nautique de Versoix
- Plastic colorful sabre training school
- Le Bushido Club Versoix Genève (jujutsu) (BCVG)
- Société de tir de Versoix (STV)(Versoix shooting sports Société founded in 1881)

== Politics ==
In the 2007 federal election the most popular party was the SVP which received 22.27% of the vote. The next three most popular parties were the Green Party (18.16%), the SP (17.05%) and the LPS Party (13.65%). In the federal election, a total of 2,338 votes were cast, and the voter turnout was 42.7%.

In the 2009 Grand Conseil election, there were a total of 5,631 registered voters of which 1,919 (34.1%) voted. The most popular party in the municipality for this election was the Libéral with 16.1% of the ballots. In the canton-wide election they received the highest proportion of votes. The second most popular party was the Les Verts (with 15.9%), they were also second in the canton-wide election, while the third most popular party was the Les Socialistes (with 11.9%), they were fourth in the canton-wide election.

For the 2009 Conseil d'Etat election, there were a total of 5,635 registered voters of which 2,286 (40.6%) voted.

In 2011, all the municipalities held local elections, and in Versoix there were 27 spots open on the municipal council. There were a total of 7,640 registered voters of which 2,857 (37.4%) voted. Out of the 2,857 votes, there were 14 blank votes, 30 null or unreadable votes and 269 votes with a name that was not on the list.

== Economy ==
As of 2010, Versoix had an unemployment rate of 7.2%. As of 2008, there were 44 people employed in the primary economic sector and about 13 businesses involved in this sector. 421 people were employed in the secondary sector and there were 66 businesses in this sector. 2,060 people were employed in the tertiary sector, with 277 businesses in this sector. There were 4,864 residents of the municipality who were employed in some capacity, of which females made up 46.1% of the workforce.

In 2008 the total number of full-time equivalent jobs was 2,146. The number of jobs in the primary sector was 34, of which 20 were in agriculture, 11 were in forestry or lumber production and 2 were in fishing or fisheries. The number of jobs in the secondary sector was 405 of which 248 or (61.2%) were in manufacturing, 8 or (2.0%) were in mining and 135 (33.3%) were in construction. The number of jobs in the tertiary sector was 1,707. In the tertiary sector; 249 or 14.6% were in wholesale or retail sales or the repair of motor vehicles, 40 or 2.3% were in the movement and storage of goods, 135 or 7.9% were in a hotel or restaurant, 12 or 0.7% were in the information industry, 51 or 3.0% were the insurance or financial industry, 77 or 4.5% were technical professionals or scientists, 665 or 39.0% were in education and 278 or 16.3% were in health care.

In 2000, there were 1,534 workers who commuted into the municipality and 3,669 workers who commuted away. The municipality is a net exporter of workers, with about 2.4 workers leaving the municipality for every one entering. About 10.7% of the workforce coming into Versoix are coming from outside Switzerland, while 0.3% of the locals commute out of Switzerland for work. Of the working population, 18.5% used public transportation to get to work, and 63.9% used a private car.

== Religion ==
From the 2000 census, 3,667 or 35.6% were Roman Catholic, while 1,963 or 19.0% belonged to the Swiss Reformed Church. Of the rest of the population, there were 191 members of an Orthodox church (or about 1.85% of the population), there were 13 individuals (or about 0.13% of the population) who belonged to the Christian Catholic Church, and there were 265 individuals (or about 2.57% of the population) who belonged to another Christian church. There were 45 individuals (or about 0.44% of the population) who were Jewish, and 554 (or about 5.37% of the population) who were Islamic. There were 46 individuals who were Buddhist, 54 individuals who were Hindu and 23 individuals who belonged to another church. 2,311 (or about 22.42% of the population) belonged to no church, are agnostic or atheist, and 1,177 individuals (or about 11.42% of the population) did not answer the question.

== Education ==
In Versoix about 2,774 or (26.9%) of the population have completed non-mandatory upper secondary education, and 2,132 or (20.7%) have completed additional higher education (either university or a Fachhochschule). Of the 2,132 who completed tertiary schooling, 31.4% were Swiss men, 26.9% were Swiss women, 22.2% were non-Swiss men and 19.5% were non-Swiss women.

During the 2009–2010 school year there were a total of 3,061 students in the Versoix school system. The education system in the Canton of Geneva allows young children to attend two years of non-obligatory Kindergarten. During that school year, there were 200 children who were in a pre-kindergarten class. The canton's school system provides two years of non-mandatory kindergarten and requires students to attend six years of primary school, with some of the children attending smaller, specialized classes. In Versoix there were 413 students in kindergarten or primary school and 65 students were in the special, smaller classes. The secondary school program consists of three lower, obligatory years of schooling, followed by three to five years of optional, advanced schools. There were 413 lower secondary students who attended school in Versoix. There were 605 upper secondary students from the municipality along with 90 students who were in a professional, non-university track program. An additional 596 students attended a private school.

As of 2000, there were 1,082 students in Versoix who came from another municipality, while 688 residents attended schools outside the municipality.

Versoix is home to the Bibliothèque Communale de Versoix library which is found in the Bolero Building.

In Versoix there are four primary public schools:Ami-Argand, Bon Séjour, École Lachenal and Monfleury. These schools go from Kindergarten to 6th grade. There is one public Middle school, the Collège des Colombières. This school goes from 7th to 9th grade. Students from Versoix, Genthod, Bellevue, Céligny, Chavannes-des-Bois and Crassier go to this school. There are no High Schools in Versoix, so the students have to go to Geneva. Two private schools are based in Versoix - Collège du Léman and the Secondary Campus of Geneva English School.

== Climate ==
The average annual temperature is 9 °C (48 °F) with an average annual rainfall of 930 mm (36.6 inches).

== Notable people ==
- Pierre-Joseph Ravel (1832 in Versoix – 1908) a Swiss civil engineer and inventor, father of the composer Maurice Ravel
- Ignacy Mościcki (1867 – 1946 in Versoix) a Polish chemist, politician and President of Poland from 1926 to 1939
- Sir Sultan Muhammed Shah, Aga Khan III (1877 – 1957 in Versoix) the 48th Imam of the Nizari Ismaili religion
- Michael I of Romania (1921–2017) the last King of Romania, and Queen Anne of Romania (1923–2016) lived in Versoix for 45 years, from 1956
- Annemie Fontana (1925 in Versoix – 2002) a Swiss sculptor and painter
- Sébastien Chevallier (born 1987 in Versoix) a Swiss beach volleyball player, competed at the 2012 Summer Olympics
