= Collex-Bossy =

- Municipality
- Flag Coat of arms
- Location of Collex-Bossy
- Location within Switzerland Location within Canton of Geneva
- Coordinates: 46°16′N 06°07′E
- Country: Switzerland
- Canton: Geneva
- District: n.a.

Government
  - Mayor: Maire; Ricardo Munoz

Area
  - Total: 6.89 km^{2} (2.66 sq mi)
- Elevation: 440 m (1,440 ft)

Population (December 2020)
  - Total: 1,686
  - Density: 245/km^{2} (634/sq mi)
- Time zone: UTC+01:00 (CET)
  - Summer (DST): UTC+02:00 (CEST)
- Postal code: 1239
- SFOS number: 6615
- ISO 3166 code: CH-GE
- Surrounded by: Genthod, Bellevue, Ferney-Voltaire (FR-01), Ornex (FR-01), Versoix, Versonnex (FR-01)
- Website: www.collex-bossy.ch

Collex-Bossy is a municipality of the Canton of Geneva, Switzerland.

== History ==
Both Collex and Bossy were first mentioned in 1258. Collex was called Coliacum while Bossy was Bocium.

Between 1790 and 1855 the municipality also included the village of Bellevue.

In 1911, shortly after the invention of powered aircraft, one of Switzerland's first aerodromes was founded in Collex-Bossy. It featured grass runways and hangars, but was already abandoned a couple of years later. In 1919, the great council of the canton of Geneva chose the site for the construction of a modern airport. However, it soon opted for the nearby area of Cointrin instead, since some land-owners demanded high prices and lengthy court cases were expected for possible expropriations.

== Geography ==
Collex-Bossy has an area, as of 2009, of 6.89 square kilometers (2.66 sq mi). Of this area, 4.42 km^{2} (1.71 sq mi) or 64.2% is used for agricultural purposes, while 1.71 km^{2} (0.66 sq mi) or 24.8% is forested. Of the rest of the land, 0.7 km^{2} (0.27 sq mi) or 10.2% is settled (buildings or roads), 0.02 km^{2} (4.9 acres) or 0.3% is either rivers or lakes and 0.01 km^{2} (2.5 acres) or 0.1% is unproductive land.

Of the built up area, housing and buildings made up 4.6% and transportation infrastructure made up 3.3%. while parks, green belts and sports fields made up 1.5%. Out of the forested land, all of the forested land area is covered with heavy forests. Of the agricultural land, 44.3% is used for growing crops and 10.7% is pastures, while 9.1% is used for orchards or vine crops. All the water in the municipality is flowing water.

The municipality is located on the right bank of the Versoix river and along the French border. It consists of the villages of Collex and Bossy.

The municipality of Collex-Bossy consists of the sub-sections or villages of Bossy, La Rosière, La Bâtie, La Foretaille and Collex.

== Demographics ==
Collex-Bossy has a population (as of December 2020) of 1,686. As of 2008, 28.6% of the population are resident foreign nationals. Over the last 10 years (1999–2009 ) the population has changed at a rate of 28.4%. It has changed at a rate of 20.5% due to migration and at a rate of 8.2% due to births and deaths.

Most of the population (as of 2000) speaks French (1,023 or 80.0%), with English being second most common (121 or 9.5%) and German being third (42 or 3.3%). There are 3 people who speak Romansh.

As of 2008, the gender distribution of the population was 49.4% male and 50.6% female. The population was made up of 575 Swiss men (34.2% of the population) and 256 (15.2%) non-Swiss men. There were 599 Swiss women (35.6%) and 251 (14.9%) non-Swiss women. Of the population in the municipality 213 or about 16.7% were born in Collex-Bossy and lived there in 2000. There were 427 or 33.4% who were born in the same canton, while 200 or 15.6% were born somewhere else in Switzerland, and 347 or 27.1% were born outside of Switzerland.

In 2008 there were 16 live births to Swiss citizens and 5 births to non-Swiss citizens, and in same time span there were 3 deaths of Swiss citizens and 1 non-Swiss citizen death. Ignoring immigration and emigration, the population of Swiss citizens increased by 13 while the foreign population increased by 4. There were 5 Swiss men who emigrated from Switzerland. At the same time, there were 8 non-Swiss women who immigrated from another country to Switzerland. The total Swiss population change in 2008 (from all sources, including moves across municipal borders) was an increase of 11 and the non-Swiss population increased by 20 people. This represents a population growth rate of 2.0%.

The age distribution of the population (as of 2000) is children and teenagers (0–19 years old) make up 30% of the population, while adults (20–64 years old) make up 61.5% and seniors (over 64 years old) make up 8.5%.

As of 2000, there were 551 people who were single and never married in the municipality. There were 619 married individuals, 40 widows or widowers and 69 individuals who are divorced.

As of 2000, there were 456 private households in the municipality, and an average of 2.6 persons per household. There were 113 households that consist of only one person and 43 households with five or more people. Out of a total of 474 households that answered this question, 23.8% were households made up of just one person and there was 1 adult who lived with their parents. Of the rest of the households, there are 116 married couples without children, 193 married couples with children There were 27 single parents with a child or children. There were 6 households that were made up of unrelated people and 18 households that were made up of some sort of institution or another collective housing.

In 2000 there were 213 single family homes (or 66.4% of the total) out of a total of 321 inhabited buildings. There were 56 multi-family buildings (17.4%), along with 38 multi-purpose buildings that were mostly used for housing (11.8%) and 14 other use buildings (commercial or industrial) that also had some housing (4.4%). Of the single family homes 51 were built before 1919, while 26 were built between 1990 and 2000. The greatest number of single family homes (71) were built between 1981 and 1990.

In 2000 there were 538 apartments in the municipality. The most common apartment size was 4 rooms of which there were 149. There were 12 single room apartments and 231 apartments with five or more rooms. Of these apartments, a total of 430 apartments (79.9% of the total) were permanently occupied, while 95 apartments (17.7%) were seasonally occupied and 13 apartments (2.4%) were empty. As of 2009, the construction rate of new housing units was 0 new units per 1000 residents. The vacancy rate for the municipality, in 2010, was 0%.

The historical population is given in the following chart:

== Politics ==
In the 2007 federal election the most popular party was the SVP which received 21.51% of the vote. The next three most popular parties were the LPS Party (17.71%), the Green Party (16.56%) and the CVP (13.93%). In the federal election, a total of 463 votes were cast, and the voter turnout was 55.1%.

In the 2009 Grand Conseil election, there were a total of 862 registered voters of which 382 (44.3%) voted. The most popular party in the municipality for this election was the Libéral with 20.3% of the ballots. In the canton-wide election they received the highest proportion of votes. The second most popular party was the MCG (with 17.9%), they were third in the canton-wide election, while the third most popular party was the PDC (with 16.0%), they were fifth in the canton-wide election.

For the 2009 Conseil d'État election, there were a total of 853 registered voters of which 465 (54.5%) voted.

In 2011, all the municipalities held local elections, and in Collex-Bossy there were 15 spots open on the municipal council. There were a total of 1,001 registered voters of which 491 (49.1%) voted. Out of the 491 votes, there were 5 blank votes, 4 null or unreadable votes and 66 votes with a name that was not on the list.

== Economy ==
As of 2010, Collex-Bossy had an unemployment rate of 2.2%. As of 2008, there were 43 people employed in the primary economic sector and about 15 businesses involved in this sector. 16 people were employed in the secondary sector and there were 8 businesses in this sector. 107 people were employed in the tertiary sector, with 27 businesses in this sector. There were 650 residents of the municipality who were employed in some capacity, of which females made up 41.5% of the workforce.

In 2008 the total number of full-time equivalent jobs was 138. The number of jobs in the primary sector was 34, of which 32 were in agriculture and 2 were in forestry or lumber production. The number of jobs in the secondary sector was 15 of which 3 or (20.0%) were in manufacturing and 10 (66.7%) were in construction. The number of jobs in the tertiary sector was 89. In the tertiary sector; 34 or 38.2% were in wholesale or retail sales or the repair of motor vehicles, 4 or 4.5% were in the movement and storage of goods, 14 or 15.7% were in a hotel or restaurant, 2 or 2.2% were in the information industry, 6 or 6.7% were technical professionals or scientists, 18 or 20.2% were in education and 1 was in health care.

In 2000, there were 73 workers who commuted into the municipality and 547 workers who commuted away. The municipality is a net exporter of workers, with about 7.5 workers leaving the municipality for every one entering. About 12.3% of the workforce coming into Collex-Bossy are coming from outside Switzerland, while 0.2% of the locals commute out of Switzerland for work. Of the working population, 11.4% used public transportation to get to work, and 71.8% used a private car.

== Religion ==
From the 2000 census, 465 or 36.4% were Roman Catholic, while 326 or 25.5% belonged to the Swiss Reformed Church. Of the rest of the population, there were 8 members of an Orthodox church (or about 0.63% of the population), there was 1 individual who belongs to the Christian Catholic Church, and there were 18 individuals (or about 1.41% of the population) who belonged to another Christian church. There was 1 individual who was Jewish, and 10 (or about 0.78% of the population) who were Islamic. There was 1 person who was Buddhist and 1 individual who belonged to another church. 302 (or about 23.61% of the population) belonged to no church, are agnostic or atheist, and 146 individuals (or about 11.42% of the population) did not answer the question.

== Education ==
In Collex-Bossy about 386 or (30.2%) of the population have completed non-mandatory upper secondary education, and 311 or (24.3%) have completed additional higher education (either university or a Fachhochschule). Of the 311 who completed tertiary schooling, 38.9% were Swiss men, 30.9% were Swiss women, 16.1% were non-Swiss men and 14.1% were non-Swiss women.

During the 2009–2010 school year there were a total of 374 students in the Collex-Bossy school system. The education system in the Canton of Geneva allows young children to attend two years of non-obligatory Kindergarten. During that school year, there were 38 children who were in a pre-kindergarten class. The canton's school system provides two years of non-mandatory kindergarten and requires students to attend six years of primary school, with some of the children attending smaller, specialized classes. In Collex-Bossy there were 46 students in kindergarten or primary school and 6 students were in the special, smaller classes. The secondary school program consists of three lower, obligatory years of schooling, followed by three to five years of optional, advanced schools. There were 46 lower secondary students who attended school in Collex-Bossy. There were 73 upper secondary students from the municipality along with 15 students who were in a professional, non-university track program. An additional 61 students attended a private school.

As of 2000, there were 14 students in Collex-Bossy who came from another municipality, while 163 residents attended schools outside the municipality.
