= Geneva English School =

School in Geneva

Geneva English School (GES)

Location
- Genthod and Versoix; Switzerland
- Coordinates: 46.26961718876135, 6.158944270974047

Information
- Type: International English School
- Founded: 1961
- Chairman: Mr Douglas Crawford
- Director: Ms Christina Matillon
- Age range: 3–18
- Language: English with enhanced studies in French language
- Website: geschool.ch

Geneva English School (GES) is an International Primary and Secondary school with campuses in Genthod and Versoix, both in the Canton of Geneva, Switzerland.

Founded in 1961, the school offers an English curriculum for students aged 3–18. GES families include international civil servants, ex-pat employees of multinational corporations, diplomats and local families who opt for an anglophone basis of education. In 2015 the school opened a new secondary campus, which has been growing organically year on year.

The school has around 350 students in the 2023–2024 academic year.

== Curriculum ==
GES follows the English system. Pupils take English GCSEs and then A Levels. Exam results are typically superior to UK national averages with 2022–23 results in GCSEs being double the UK average and A-level results typically enabling a high number of school graduates to progress to Oxbridge or Ivy-league institutions.
