= Pierre-Joseph Ravel =

Swiss-French engineer

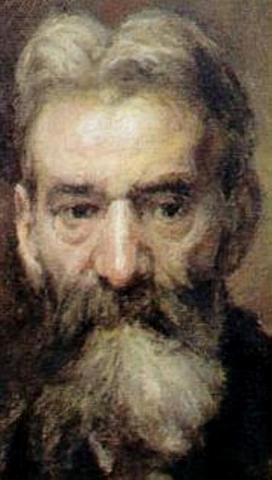
- Ravel, portrait by Marcellin Desboutin; 1896
- Born: 19 September 1832; Versoix, Canton of Geneva, Switzerland
- Died: 13 October 1908 (aged 76); Levallois-Perret, Hauts-de-Seine, France
- Occupation: Civil engineer
- Known for: Steam-driven automobile
- Children: Maurice Ravel

Pierre-Joseph Ravel (Note: The family name was originally written Ravex or Ravet. It seems to have been turned into Ravel because the t in Ravet was misread.) (19 September 1832 – 13 October 1908) was a Swiss-French civil engineer and inventor who was an early pioneer of the automobile industry. He invented and drove the steam-powered automobile in the late 1860s, developed an acetylene-powered two-stroke engine, built a racing car that could achieve speeds of up to 6 kilometres per hour (3.7 mph), and built a vehicle that could perform a somersault.

Ravel was the father of Maurice Ravel, a French Impressionist composer.

== Biography ==
=== Early life ===
Pierre-Joseph Ravel (also known as simply Joseph) was born in Versoix, Canton of Geneva, Switzerland on 19 September 1832. His father, Aimé (or Ami) Ravel, was born in Collonges-sous-Salève in France. He moved to Versoix where he worked as a baker and became a Swiss citizen in 1834 he got married at 2 years old? through marriage to a young Swiss girl, Caroline Grosfort. They had five children – Pierre-Joseph, Marie, Alexandrine, Louise and Édouard. The youngest, Édouard John Ravel, became a painter. Pierre Joseph was interested in music as a child.

Ravel became a civil engineer. After completing his engineering studies, he directed the construction of the railway line from Madrid to Irun in Spain. He had moved to Paris by 1868. On 2 September 1868, he obtained a patent for a "steam generator heated by oil, applied to locomotion". Afterwards, he invented a supercharged two-stroke engine. Ravel drove his steam-driven automobile for short trips in the industrial areas around Paris just before the Franco-Prussian War of 1870. During the war, the shed where the machine was stored was buried under the fortifications built for the defence of Paris, and Ravel was ruined. Soon after the war he again became involved in railroad construction in Spain.

=== Further innovations ===
Ravel met his future wife, Marie Delouart (1840–1917), in Aranjuez, near Madrid. She was from a Basque background. They married in Paris on 3 April 1873. Both of them were baptised Catholic; however, Delouart was a freethinker. Their first son, Joseph-Maurice Ravel, was born on 7 March 1875 in the village of Ciboure in Basque country just north of the Spanish border. Three months later the Ravel family moved back to Paris. The family encouraged Maurice Ravel in his career in music. Their second son, Édouard Ravel (1878–1960) was born in Paris. Later Édouard became an engineer.

In 1880 Joseph Ravel built an acetylene-powered two-stroke engine. He abandoned the design after a series of accidents culminated in a huge explosion. In 1897 Joseph and Édouard Ravel made a new two-stroke engine. In 1905 they filed a patent for a system by which a vehicle could execute a somersault. They went on to build the "vortex of death", which toured the Parisian music halls. The show was taken to the US and presented by the Barnum and Bailey circus until the car missed its soft landing and crashed, killing the driver. Sometime after the Ravels invented a circular water track with an artificial current, the ancestor of the modern jacuzzi, which let a swimmer train without needing an Olympic-size pool. Ravel's other inventions included a machine for sewing paper bags, a type of machine gun, and a car which he drove on Swiss roads at up to 6 kilometres per hour (3.7 mph).

Ravel suffered from a brain hemorrhage, and in August 1906 went with his son Maurice to recover in Hermance, at the end of Lake Geneva. Pierre-Joseph Ravel died in 1908.

== Sources ==
- Monnard, Jean-François (March 2012). "Les séjours de Maurice Ravel en Suisse". Revue Musicale de Suisse Romande (in French). 65 (1).
- Orenstein, Arbie (1975). Ravel: Man and Musician. Courier Corporation. ISBN 978-0-486-26633-6.
- Ravel, Maurice; Orenstein, Arbie (2003-08-01). A Ravel Reader: Correspondence, Articles, Interviews. Courier Corporation. ISBN 978-0-486-43078-2.
- "RAVEL Pierre-Joseph (1832 - 1908)". Association Patrimoine Versoisien.
- Zank, Stephen (2013-05-24). Maurice Ravel: A Guide to Research. Routledge. ISBN 978-1-135-17344-9.
