= Genthod =

- Municipality
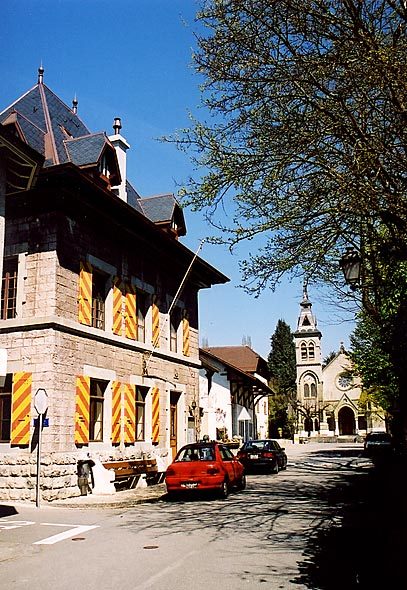

- Flag Coat of arms
- Location of Genthod
- Location within Switzerland Location within Canton of Geneva
- Coordinates: 46°16′N 06°09′E
- Country: Switzerland
- Canton: Geneva
- District: n.a.

Government
  - Mayor: Maire; Wolfgang Honegger

Area
  - Total: 2.87 km^{2} (1.11 sq mi)
- Elevation: 405 m (1,329 ft)

Population (December 2020)
  - Total: 2,893
  - Density: 1,010/km^{2} (2,610/sq mi)
- Time zone: UTC+01:00 (CET)
  - Summer (DST): UTC+02:00 (CEST)
- Postal code: 1294
- SFOS number: 6622
- ISO 3166 code: CH-GE
- Surrounded by: Bellevue, Collex-Bossy, Versoix
- Website: www.genthod.ch

Genthod is a municipality of the Canton of Geneva, Switzerland.

== History ==
Genthod is first mentioned around 1301-1400 as Gentouz.

== Geography ==
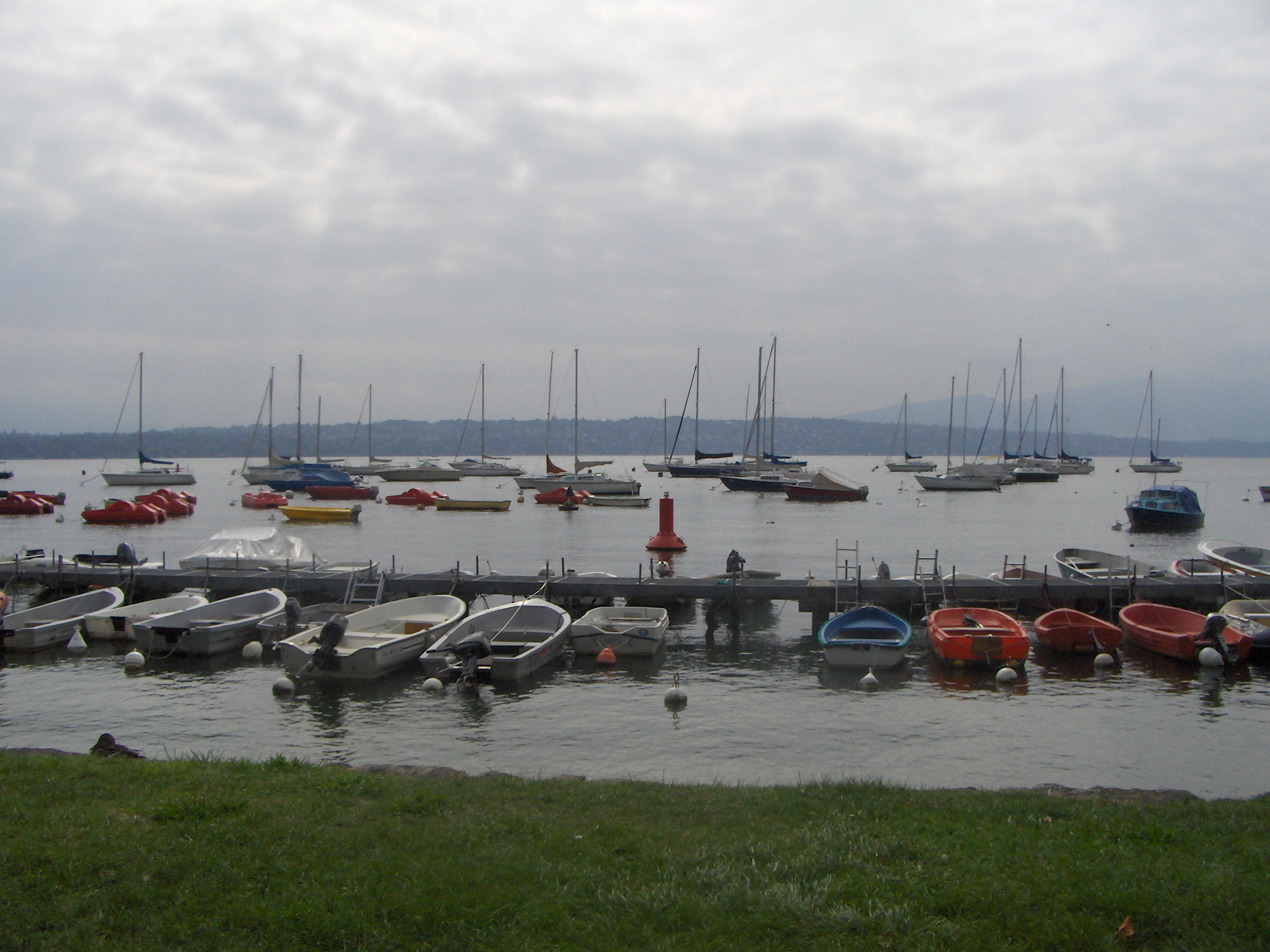
Genthod harbor

Genthod has an area, as of 2009, of 2.87 square kilometers (1.11 sq mi). Of this area, 1.04 km^{2} (0.40 sq mi) or 36.2% is used for agricultural purposes, while 0.23 km^{2} (0.089 sq mi) or 8.0% is forested. Of the rest of the land, 1.54 km^{2} (0.59 sq mi) or 53.7% is settled (buildings or roads).

Of the built up area, housing and buildings made up 44.6% and transportation infrastructure made up 7.3%. Out of the forested land, 5.2% of the total land area is heavily forested and 2.8% is covered with orchards or small clusters of trees. Of the agricultural land, 22.6% is used for growing crops and 10.1% is pastures, while 3.5% is used for orchards or vine crops.

The municipality is located on the right bank of Lake Geneva between Bellevue and Versoix. It consists of the village of Genthod and the hamlets of Malagny and Creux-de-Genthod. It is home to the Creux-de-Genthod yacht club.

The municipality of Genthod consists of the sub-sections or villages of Pierre-Grise, Rennex, Genthod and Les Rousses.

== Demographics ==
Genthod has a population (as of December 2020) of 2,893. As of 2008, 34.5% of the population are resident foreign nationals. Over the last 10 years (1999–2009 ) the population has changed at a rate of 25.7%. It has changed at a rate of 23.8% due to migration and at a rate of 2% due to births and deaths.

Most of the population (as of 2000) speaks French (1,582 or 72.9%), with English being second most common (247 or 11.4%) and German being third (96 or 4.4%). There are 58 people who speak Italian and 1 person who speaks Romansh.

As of 2008, the gender distribution of the population was 49.1% male and 50.9% female. The population was made up of 837 Swiss men (30.2% of the population) and 525 (18.9%) non-Swiss men. There were 921 Swiss women (33.2%) and 489 (17.6%) non-Swiss women. Of the population in the municipality 273 or about 12.6% were born in Genthod and lived there in 2000. There were 605 or 27.9% who were born in the same canton, while 365 or 16.8% were born somewhere else in Switzerland, and 779 or 35.9% were born outside of Switzerland.

In 2008 there were 15 live births to Swiss citizens and 12 births to non-Swiss citizens, and in same time span there were 18 deaths of Swiss citizens and 4 non-Swiss citizen deaths. Ignoring immigration and emigration, the population of Swiss citizens decreased by 3 while the foreign population increased by 8. There were 13 Swiss men and 8 Swiss women who emigrated from Switzerland. At the same time, there were 41 non-Swiss men and 27 non-Swiss women who immigrated from another country to Switzerland. The total Swiss population change in 2008 (from all sources, including moves across municipal borders) was an increase of 3 and the non-Swiss population increased by 67 people. This represents a population growth rate of 2.7%.

The age distribution of the population (as of 2000) is children and teenagers (0–19 years old) make up 27% of the population, while adults (20–64 years old) make up 61.3% and seniors (over 64 years old) make up 11.7%.

As of 2000, there were 887 people who were single and never married in the municipality. There were 1,063 married individuals, 108 widows or widowers and 113 individuals who are divorced.

As of 2000, there were 736 private households in the municipality, and an average of 2.7 persons per household. There were 178 households that consist of only one person and 75 households with five or more people. Out of a total of 765 households that answered this question, 23.3% were households made up of just one person and there were 11 adults who lived with their parents. Of the rest of the households, there are 193 married couples without children, 306 married couples with children There were 43 single parents with a child or children. There were 5 households that were made up of unrelated people and 29 households that were made up of some sort of institution or another collective housing.

In 2000 there were 498 single family homes (or 79.6% of the total) out of a total of 626 inhabited buildings. There were 63 multi-family buildings (10.1%), along with 44 multi-purpose buildings that were mostly used for housing (7.0%) and 21 other use buildings (commercial or industrial) that also had some housing (3.4%). Of the single family homes 58 were built before 1919, while 78 were built between 1990 and 2000. The greatest number of single family homes (133) were built between 1981 and 1990.

In 2000 there were 809 apartments in the municipality. The most common apartment size was 5 rooms of which there were 183. There were 15 single room apartments and 457 apartments with five or more rooms. Of these apartments, a total of 714 apartments (88.3% of the total) were permanently occupied, while 79 apartments (9.8%) were seasonally occupied and 16 apartments (2.0%) were empty. As of 2009, the construction rate of new housing units was 0.4 new units per 1000 residents. The vacancy rate for the municipality, in 2010, was 1.15%.

The historical population is given in the following chart:

== Heritage sites of national significance ==
The Campagne Bonnet, Campagne du Creux-de-Genthod and the Campagne du Grand-Malagny are listed as Swiss heritage site of national significance. The entire village of Genthod is part of the Inventory of Swiss Heritage Sites.

== Politics ==
In the 2007 federal election the most popular party was the SVP which received 21.71% of the vote. The next three most popular parties were the LPS Party (20.07%), the Green Party (16.01%) and the SP (13.64%). In the federal election, a total of 734 votes were cast, and the voter turnout was 55.0%.

In the 2009 Grand Conseil election, there were a total of 1,322 registered voters of which 564 (42.7%) voted. The most popular party in the municipality for this election was the Libéral with 29.5% of the ballots. In the canton-wide election they received the highest proportion of votes. The second most popular party was the Les Verts (with 14.1%), they were also second in the canton-wide election, while the third most popular party was the MCG (with 12.3%), they were also third in the canton-wide election.

For the 2009 Conseil d'État election, there were a total of 1,321 registered voters of which 670 (50.7%) voted.

In 2011, all the municipalities held local elections, and in Genthod there were 17 spots open on the municipal council. There were a total of 1,614 registered voters of which 856 (53.0%) voted. Out of the 856 votes, there were 2 blank votes, 2 null or unreadable votes and 85 votes with a name that was not on the list.

== Economy ==
As of 2010, Genthod had an unemployment rate of 3.2%. As of 2008, there were 16 people employed in the primary economic sector and about 4 businesses involved in this sector. 396 people were employed in the secondary sector and there were 12 businesses in this sector. 306 people were employed in the tertiary sector, with 49 businesses in this sector. There were 1,030 residents of the municipality who were employed in some capacity, of which females made up 42.9% of the workforce.

In 2008 the total number of full-time equivalent jobs was 627. The number of jobs in the primary sector was 14, all of which were in agriculture. The number of jobs in the secondary sector was 376 of which 357 or (94.9%) were in manufacturing and 19 (5.1%) were in construction. The number of jobs in the tertiary sector was 237. In the tertiary sector; 23 or 9.7% were in wholesale or retail sales or the repair of motor vehicles, 4 or 1.7% were in the movement and storage of goods, 24 or 10.1% were in a hotel or restaurant, 4 or 1.7% were in the information industry, 1 was the insurance or financial industry, 16 or 6.8% were technical professionals or scientists, 38 or 16.0% were in education and 107 or 45.1% were in health care.

In 2000, there were 341 workers who commuted into the municipality and 890 workers who commuted away. The municipality is a net exporter of workers, with about 2.6 workers leaving the municipality for every one entering. About 12.6% of the workforce coming into Genthod are coming from outside Switzerland, while 0.1% of the locals commute out of Switzerland for work. Of the working population, 11.5% used public transportation to get to work, and 72.4% used a private car.

== Religion ==
From the 2000 census, 706 or 32.5% were Roman Catholic, while 542 or 25.0% belonged to the Swiss Reformed Church. Of the rest of the population, there were 31 members of an Orthodox church (or about 1.43% of the population), there were 6 individuals (or about 0.28% of the population) who belonged to the Christian Catholic Church, and there were 64 individuals (or about 2.95% of the population) who belonged to another Christian church. There were 22 individuals (or about 1.01% of the population) who were Jewish, and 82 (or about 3.78% of the population) who were Islamic. There were 10 individuals who were Hindu and 8 individuals who belonged to another church. 478 (or about 22.02% of the population) belonged to no church, are agnostic or atheist, and 222 individuals (or about 10.23% of the population) did not answer the question.

== Education ==
In Genthod about 584 or (26.9%) of the population have completed non-mandatory upper secondary education, and 585 or (26.9%) have completed additional higher education (either university or a Fachhochschule). Of the 585 who completed tertiary schooling, 35.6% were Swiss men, 25.8% were Swiss women, 22.7% were non-Swiss men and 15.9% were non-Swiss women.

During the 2009-2010 school year there were a total of 635 students in the Genthod school system. The education system in the Canton of Geneva allows young children to attend two years of non-obligatory Kindergarten. During that school year, there were 44 children who were in a pre-kindergarten class. The canton's school system provides two years of non-mandatory kindergarten and requires students to attend six years of primary school, with some of the children attending smaller, specialized classes. In Genthod there were 84 students in kindergarten or primary school and 21 students were in the special, smaller classes. The secondary school program consists of three lower, obligatory years of schooling, followed by three to five years of optional, advanced schools. There were 84 lower secondary students who attended school in Genthod. There were 104 upper secondary students from the municipality along with 18 students who were in a professional, non-university track program. An additional 127 students attended a private school.

As of 2000, there were 138 students in Genthod who came from another municipality, while 311 residents attended schools outside the municipality.

The Geneva English School (GES), a private school, is in Genthod.
