= Mont d'Amin =

Mountain in Switzerland

- Location within Switzerland

Highest point
- Elevation: 1,417 m (4,649 ft)
- Prominence: 134 m (440 ft)
- Parent peak: Mont Racine
- Coordinates: 47°04′58″N 6°54′24″E

Geography
- Location: Neuchâtel, Switzerland
- Parent range: Jura Mountains

Mont d'Amin (1,417 m) is a mountain of the Jura, located east of the Vue des Alpes in the canton of Neuchâtel. It lies on the range between the valleys of Saint-Imier and Val-de-Ruz.
