= Chasseral Pass =

Mountain pass in Switzerland

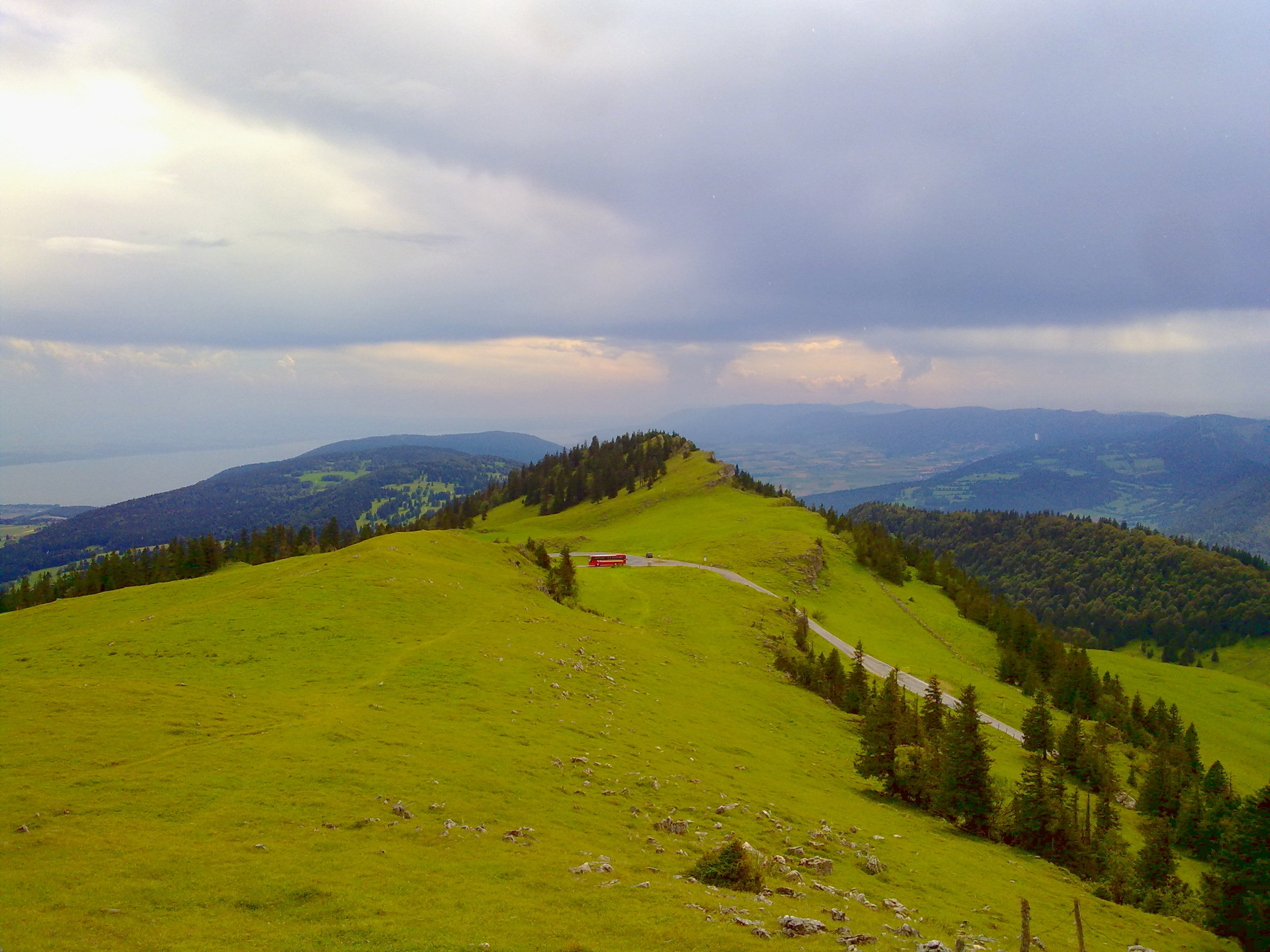
- The Chasseral Pass seen from Chasseral Ouest

- Location within Switzerland
- Elevation: 1,502 metres (4,928 ft)
- Traversed by: Road

Third Approach
- Location: Bern/Neuchâtel, Switzerland
- Range: Jura Mountains
- Coordinates: 47°08′05″N 07°03′40″E

Chasseral Pass (German: Gestler) (el. 1502 m.) is a high mountain pass in the Jura Mountains, lying west of the Chasseral. The pass is located on the border between the Swiss cantons of Neuchâtel (north side) and Bern (south side). It is traversed by a road connecting Saint-Imier and Nods, both located in the Bernese Jura. North-east of the pass is the Chasseral Ouest, the highest point of the canton of Neuchâtel.

From the summit of the pass another road leads to the Chasseral hotel (1,548 m) and summit of the Chasseral (1,607 m).

== Weather ==
Climate data for Chasseral Pass
Month	Jan	Feb	Mar	Apr	May	Jun	Jul	Aug	Sep	Oct	Nov	Dec	Year
Mean daily maximum °C (°F)	−0.6 (30.9)	−0.9 (30.4)	0.3 (32.5)	3.2 (37.8)	7.9 (46.2)	11.3 (52.3)	14 (57)	13.3 (55.9)	11 (52)	8 (46)	2.6 (36.7)	0.6 (33.1)	5.9 (42.6)
Daily mean °C (°F)	−3.1 (26.4)	−3.4 (25.9)	−2 (28)	0.5 (32.9)	4.8 (40.6)	8.2 (46.8)	10.7 (51.3)	10.4 (50.7)	8.3 (46.9)	5.4 (41.7)	0.2 (32.4)	−2 (28)	3.2 (37.8)
Mean daily minimum °C (°F)	−5.5 (22.1)	−5.7 (21.7)	−4.1 (24.6)	−1.9 (28.6)	2.2 (36.0)	5.3 (41.5)	7.7 (45.9)	7.6 (45.7)	5.6 (42.1)	2.9 (37.2)	−2.2 (28.0)	−4.5 (23.9)	0.6 (33.1)
Average precipitation mm (inches)	163 (6.4)	166 (6.5)	130 (5.1)	82 (3.2)	101 (4.0)	118 (4.6)	99 (3.9)	90 (3.5)	83 (3.3)	78 (3.1)	114 (4.5)	174 (6.9)	1,396 (55.0)
Average precipitation days	13.7	11.4	13.6	11.5	14.7	13.3	9.9	10.7	9.5	9.7	11.2	13.6	142.8
Source: MeteoSchweiz

== See also ==
- List of highest paved roads in Europe
- List of mountain passes
- List of the highest Swiss passes
