= Le Reculet =

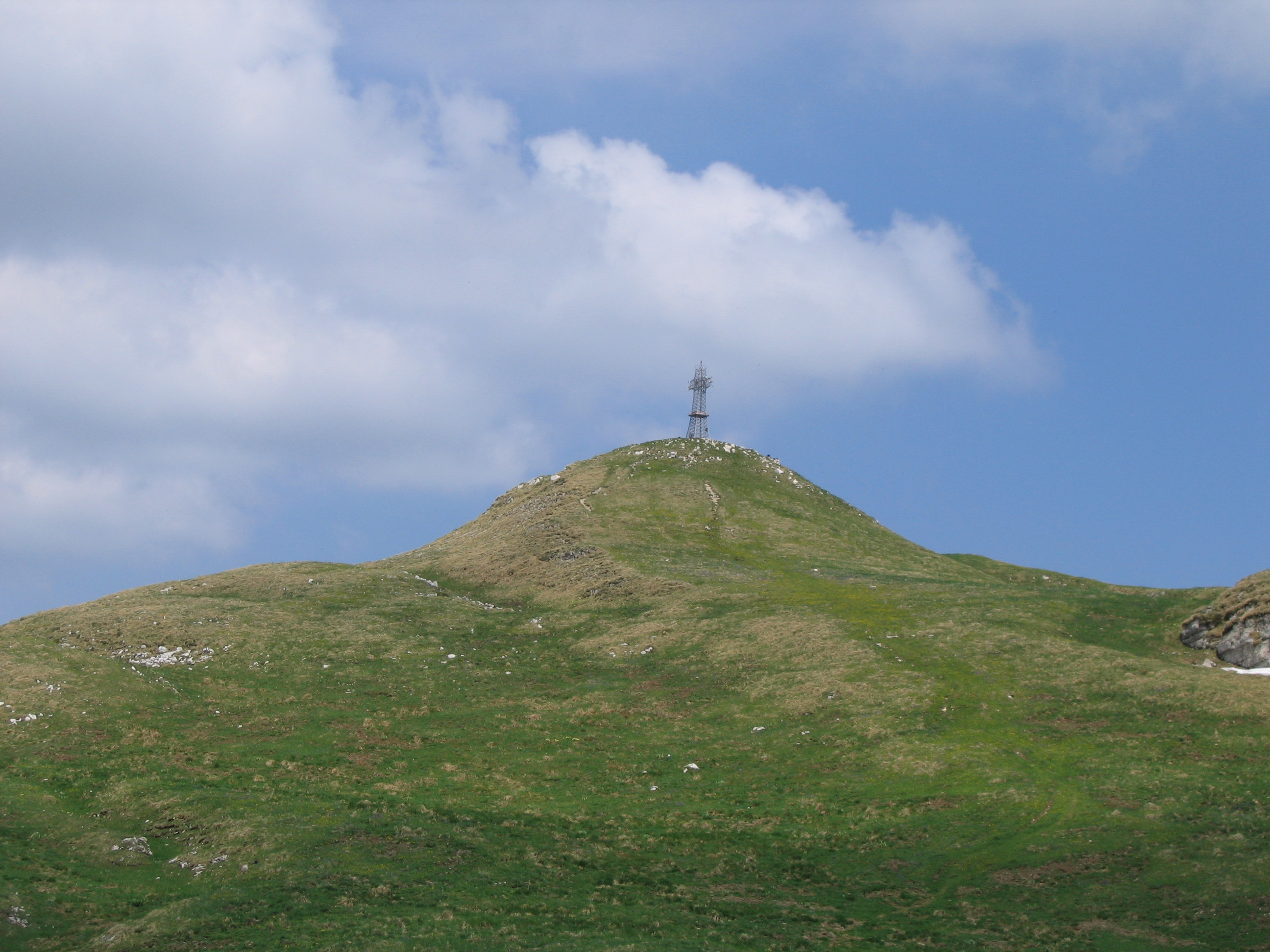
- The summit of Le Reculet

Highest point
- Elevation: 1,717 m (5,633 ft)
- Coordinates: 46°15′24″N 5°55′48″E

Geography
- Location within France
- Location: Ain, Rhône-Alpes, France
- Parent range: Jura Mountains

Le Reculet is the second-highest peak in the Jura Mountains, with an elevation of 1717 metres. It is located in the Ain department of France. It is a few kilometres south of the Crêt de la Neige on the territory of the town of Thoiry.

The summit has views of the Pays de Gex, Geneva, Lake Geneva, the Alps, Mont Blanc, and on clear days the Chaîne des Puys. The inhabitants of Thoiry erected a cross on the summit.

Le Reculet was sometimes designated as the highest point of the Jura, until the elevation of the Crêt de la Neige was remeasured as 1720 m instead of 1717.6 m. In 2024, precise measurements give an elevation of 1717.14 metres for Le Reculet, almost a metre lower than the geodetic marker at Crêt de la Neige (1718.06 m), and more than 3 metres lower than the highest point of the Jura (1720.83 m) near Crêt de la Neige.
