= Ensen =

Ensen may refer to:

- Ensen, Cologne, a district of Porz, Cologne, Germany
- Ensen tribe, an indigenous people in the Salinas area of California who spoke Rumsen language
- Ensen (album), a 2017 album by Emel Mathlouthi

== See also ==
- Ensign (disambiguation)
- Enson (disambiguation)
