= Col de la Faucille =

Mountain pass in France

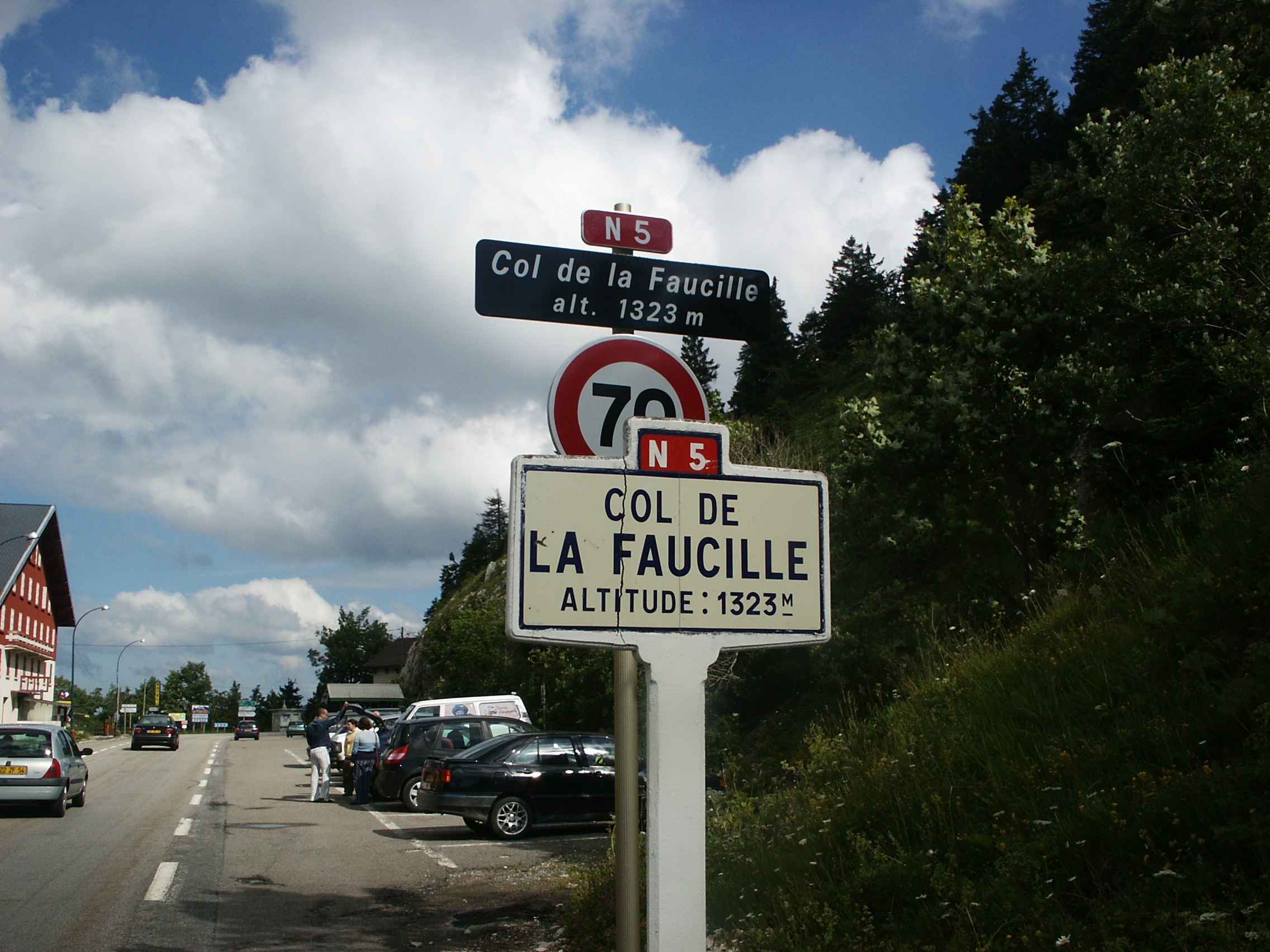

- Location within Alps
- Elevation: 1,323 m (4,341 ft)

Location
- Location: Ain, France
- Range: Jura Mountains
- Coordinates: 46°22′N 06°02′E

Col de la Faucille is a high mountain pass in the department of Ain in the French Jura Mountains. It connects the town of Gex in Ain to the towns of Les Rousses and Saint-Claude in the department of Jura.

The Tour de France has traversed this category 2 climb 41 times, starting in 1911 and most recently in 2004.

Stage 3 of the 2026 Tour de France Femmes will traverse this climb.

The area has become popular as a ski resort known as Mijoux – Col de la Faucille.

== The Pass Environment ==
The pass is located along a road, 8.5 km from the village of Mijoux and 14 km from the town center of Gex. It lies on the boundary between these two municipalities. This boundary also marks the edge of the Pays de Gex Free Trade Zone, which explains the presence of a customs post at the pass a facility that is no longer in use. During the ascent from Gex, one can spot the "Napoleon’s Fountain" on the right side of the road at a bend, 4 km from the summit. Further up1.7 km from the summit there is another bend where one can stop at a small parking area known as "Pailly"; from this spot, the view of Mont Blanc is completely unobstructed.

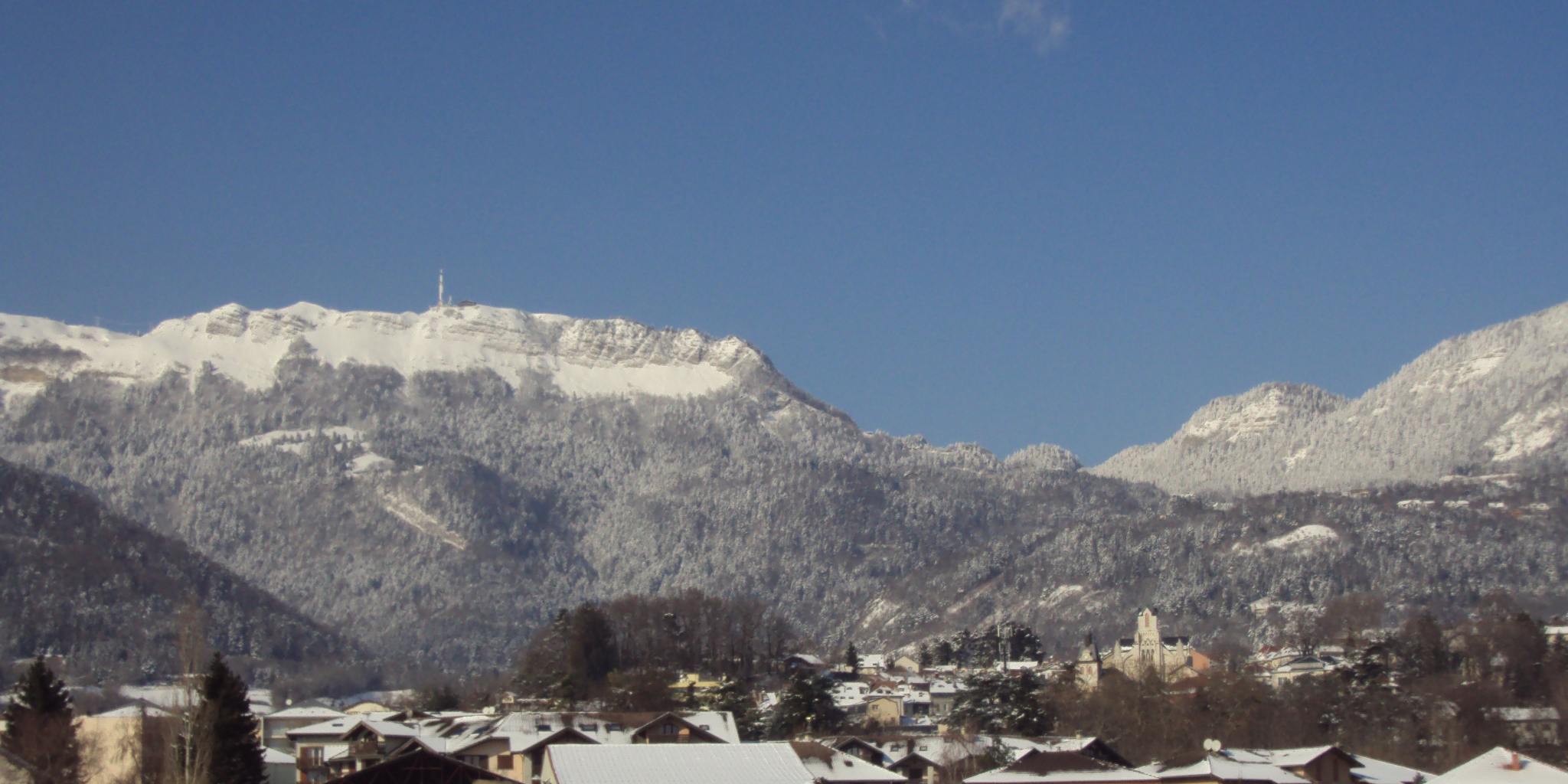
The Mont Rond and the Col de la Faucille above the city of Gex in winter.

== History ==
=== 19th Century ===
At the beginning of the 19th century, the Col de la Faux was still a route used by stagecoaches arriving from Paris, carrying news that was sometimes of critical importance. In 1823 for instance, the Genevan banker Laviron set up a telescope at his home, trained on the Col du Fossile. He reached an agreement with a stagecoach driver from Paris: if the price of bonds in Paris rose by 3%, the driver would attach a white cloth to his whip. The banker would then promptly purchase the bonds and resell them to other Genevan bankers who would not learn of the news until the stagecoach arrived at the Place de la Mollard in Geneva.

== See also ==
- List of highest paved roads in Europe
- List of mountain passes
