= Rocher des Tablettes =

Mountain in Switzerland

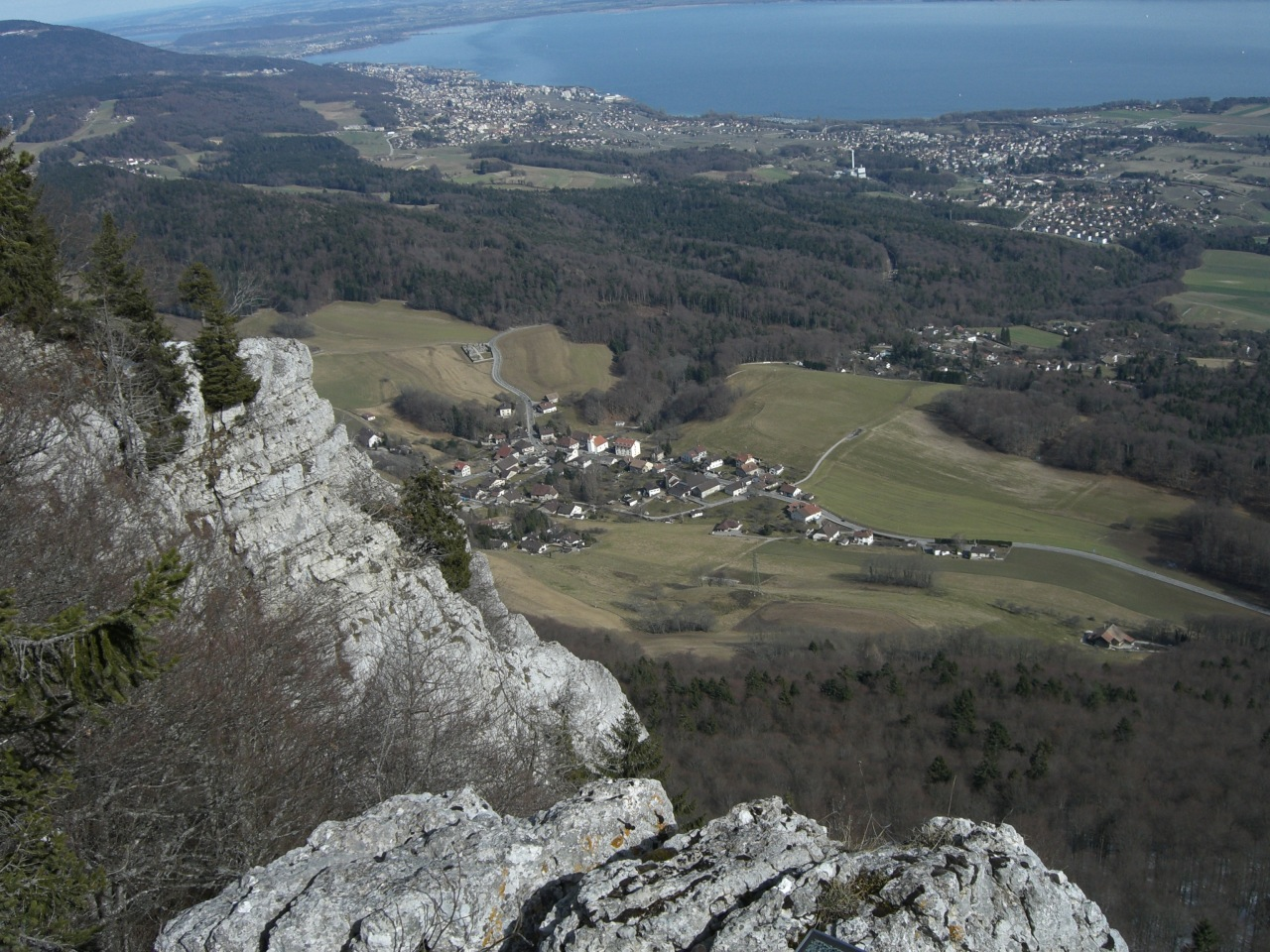
- View from the panoramic view point over Lake Neuchâtel

Highest point
- Elevation: 1,288 m (4,226 ft)
- Prominence: 118 m (387 ft)
- Parent peak: Mont Racine
- Coordinates: 46°58′34″N 6°47′14″E

Geography
- Location within Switzerland
- Location: Neuchâtel, Switzerland
- Parent range: Jura Mountains

The Rocher des Tablettes (1,288 m) is a mountain of the Jura, located west of Rochefort in the canton of Neuchâtel. Its south side consists of steep limestone cliffs overlooking the valley of the Areuse.
