= Chasseral Ouest =

Mountain in Switzerland

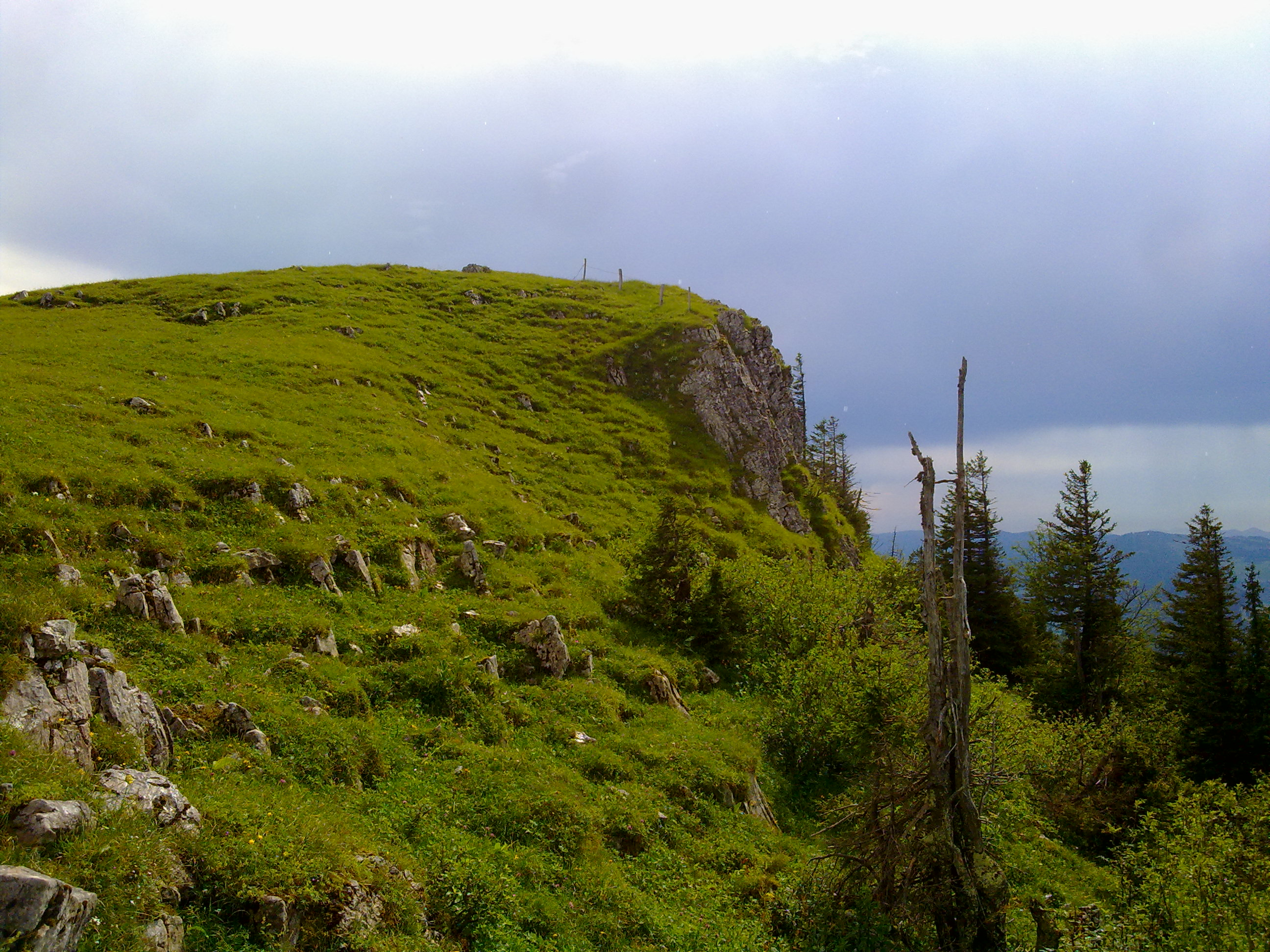
- View from the east side

Highest point
- Elevation: 1,552 m (5,092 ft)
- Prominence: 12 m (39 ft)
- Parent peak: Chasseral
- Listing: Canton high point
- Coordinates: 47°07′18.5″N 7°02′08″E

Geography
- Location within Switzerland
- Location: Neuchâtel/Bern, Switzerland
- Parent range: Jura Mountains

The Chasseral Ouest is a prominence west of the Chasseral, in the Jura Mountains. It is located on the border between the Swiss cantons of Neuchâtel and Bern. The Chasseral Ouest reaches an elevation of 1,552 metres above sea level and is the highest point of the canton of Neuchâtel.

The summit is easily accessible to hikers and is located near the Chasseral Pass road (1,502 m).
