= La Barillette =

Mountain in Switzerland

Coordinates: 46°25′50″N 6°07′34″E

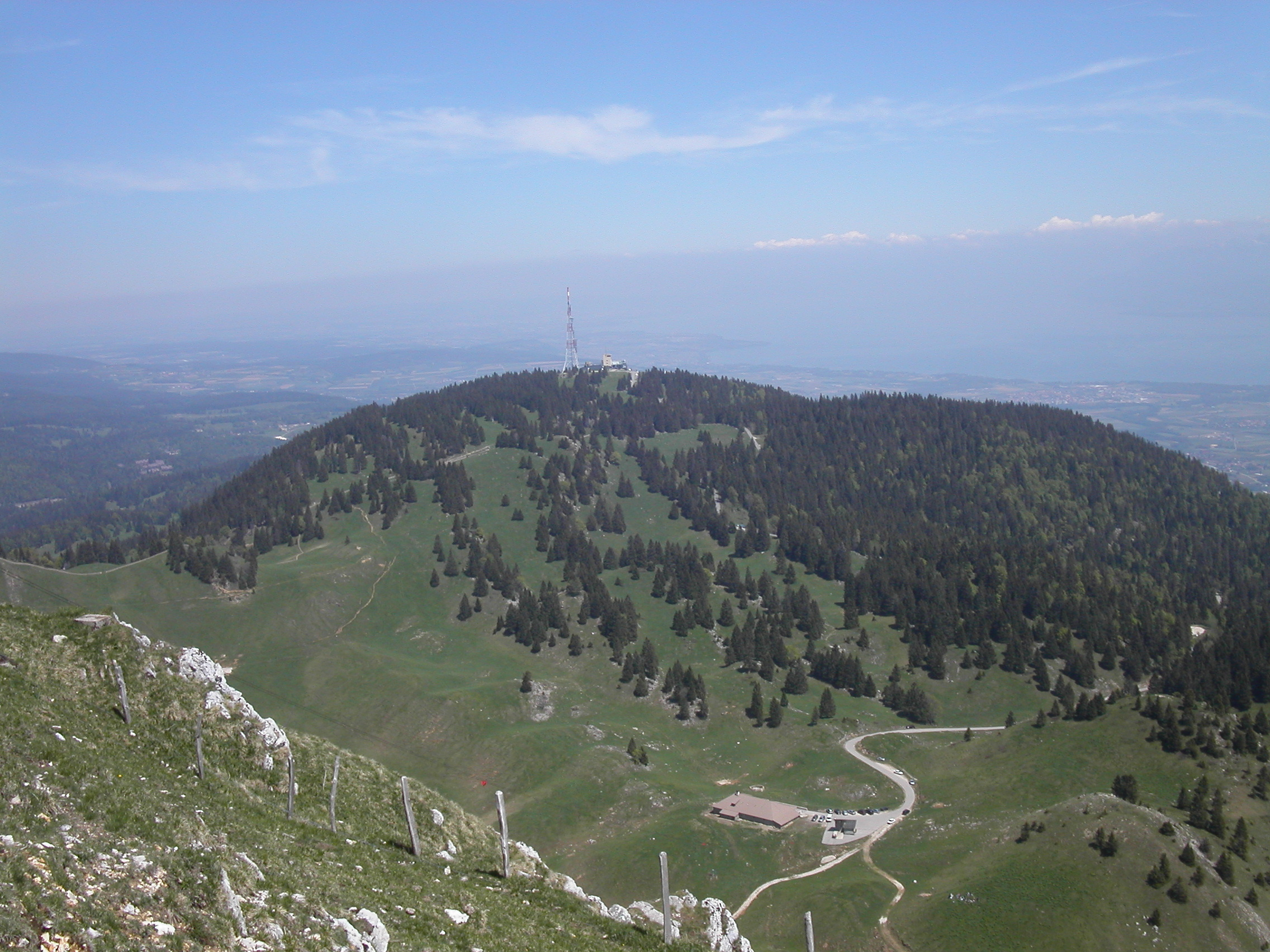
View of Barillette

La Barillette (1,525 m) is one of the highest points of Canton Vaud's Jura Mountains in Switzerland.
