= Enson =

Enson may refer to:

- Enson (album), by Masaaki Endoh
- Enson Inoue (born 1967), Japanese mixed martial artist
- Faux d'Enson, a mountain in Switzerland
- Enson, a character in The First comic book series
- Enson, Staffordshire, a hamlet in England

== See also ==
- Enson (disambiguation)
