= Chasseral =

Mountain in Switzerland

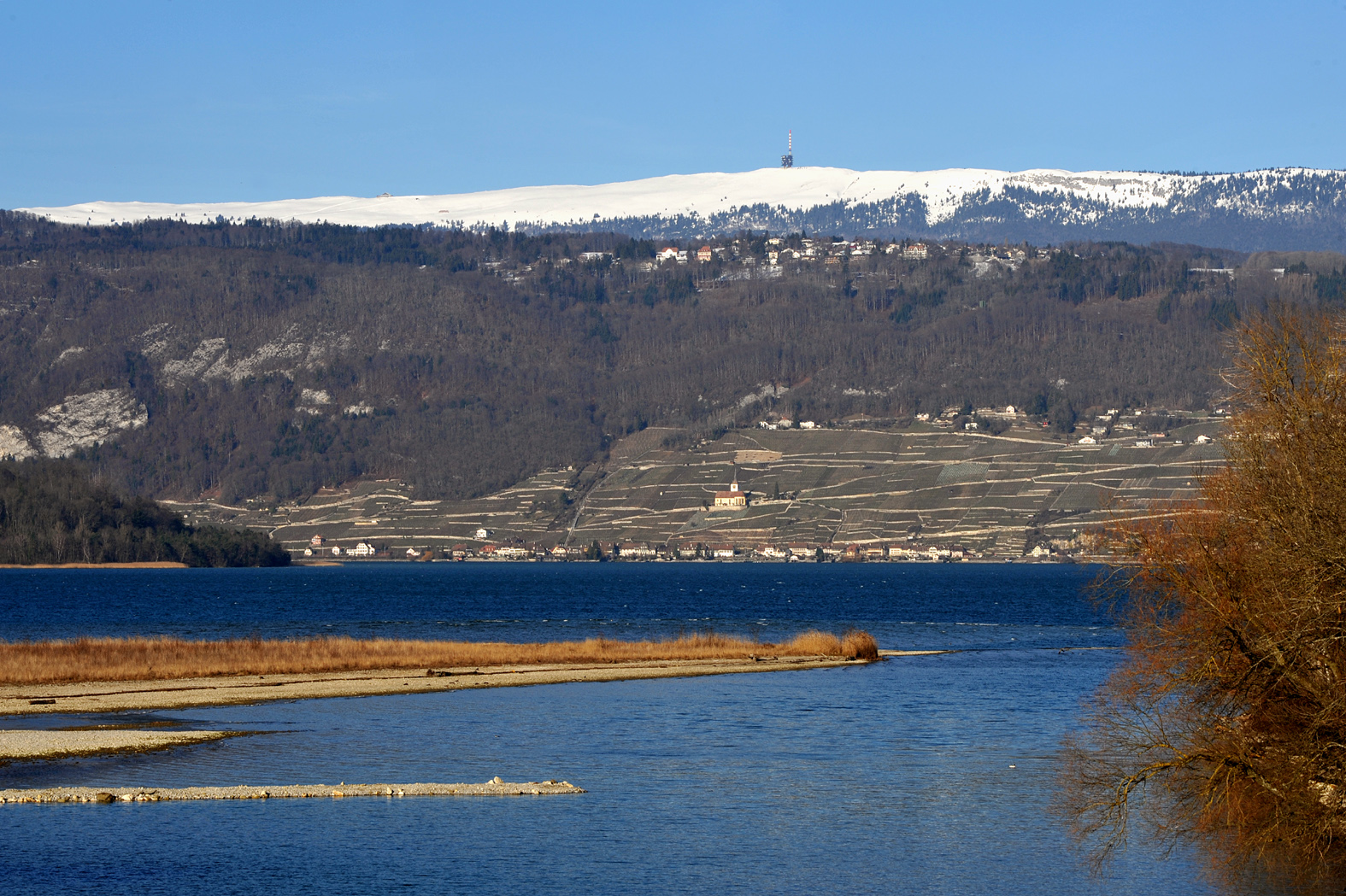
- View from Lake Biel (south side)

Highest point
- Elevation: 1,606 m (5,269 ft)
- Prominence: 666 m (2,185 ft)
- Parent peak: Crêt de la Neige
- Isolation: 49.5 km (30.8 mi)
- Coordinates: 47°07′59″N 7°03′34″E

Geography
- Location within Switzerland
- Location: Bern, Switzerland
- Parent range: Jura Mountains

The Chasseral is a mountain of the Jura Mountains, overlooking Lake Biel in the Swiss canton of Bern. With an elevation of 1,606 metres above sea level, the Chasseral is the highest summit in the canton of Bern outside the Alps. It is also both the northernmost and easternmost mountain reaching over 1,500 metres in the Jura Mountains. West of the summit is located the Chasseral Ouest (1,552 m), where runs the border with the canton of Neuchâtel. The Chasseral Pass is located further on the west.

The Chasseral is the fourth most topographically isolated mountain of Switzerland, although it is the first when considering only easily accessible summits. This results in a very extensive view over the other mountains of the Jura, the Swiss Plateau, the Alps, the Vosges and the Black Forest. The summit can be reached from the Chasseral hotel, where there is a bus stop.

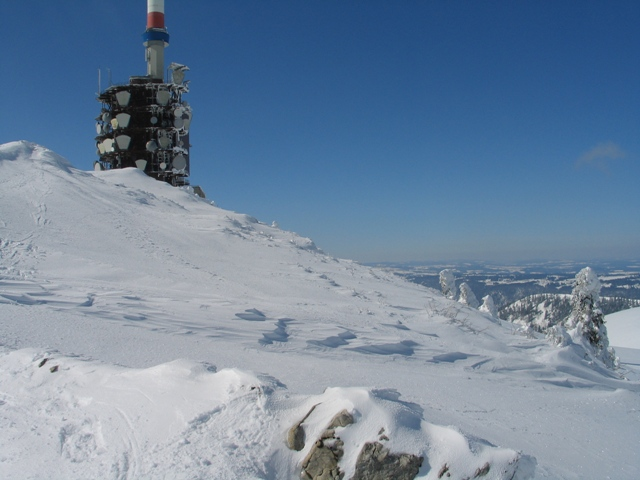
The Chasseral summit in winter

== Climate ==
Climate data for Chasseral, elevation 1,594 m (5,230 ft), (1991–2020)
Month	Jan	Feb	Mar	Apr	May	Jun	Jul	Aug	Sep	Oct	Nov	Dec	Year
Mean daily maximum °C (°F)	0.3 (32.5)	−0.1 (31.8)	2.3 (36.1)	5.8 (42.4)	10.1 (50.2)	13.7 (56.7)	15.8 (60.4)	15.6 (60.1)	11.7 (53.1)	8.4 (47.1)	3.7 (38.7)	1.2 (34.2)	7.4 (45.3)
Daily mean °C (°F)	−2.3 (27.9)	−2.8 (27.0)	−0.5 (31.1)	2.5 (36.5)	6.4 (43.5)	10.0 (50.0)	12.0 (53.6)	12.1 (53.8)	8.4 (47.1)	5.5 (41.9)	1.1 (34.0)	−1.4 (29.5)	4.3 (39.7)
Mean daily minimum °C (°F)	−4.7 (23.5)	−5.2 (22.6)	−3.0 (26.6)	−0.3 (31.5)	3.5 (38.3)	7.0 (44.6)	8.9 (48.0)	9.3 (48.7)	5.9 (42.6)	3.0 (37.4)	−1.3 (29.7)	−3.8 (25.2)	1.6 (34.9)
Average precipitation mm (inches)	95.8 (3.77)	91.8 (3.61)	96.6 (3.80)	103.7 (4.08)	133.6 (5.26)	133.5 (5.26)	136.4 (5.37)	142.4 (5.61)	116.6 (4.59)	122.2 (4.81)	110.4 (4.35)	112.7 (4.44)	1,395.7 (54.95)
Average precipitation days (≥ 1.0 mm)	11.1	9.9	10.7	11.2	13.9	12.7	12.5	12.1	10.7	12.7	11.3	12.5	141.3
Average relative humidity (%)	75	76	79	79	82	82	81	81	84	80	78	76	79
Mean monthly sunshine hours	98.0	104.7	140.0	156.5	163.6	180.0	202.2	189.2	150.1	130.8	93.4	85.3	1,693.8
Percentage possible sunshine	36	36	38	39	36	39	43	44	40	39	34	33	39
Source 1: NOAA
Source 2: MeteoSwiss

== See also ==
- List of mountains of Switzerland
- List of mountains of Switzerland accessible by public transport
- Nature parks in Switzerland
