= Mijoux =

Commune in Auvergne-Rhône-Alpes, France

Mijoux Mijor (Arpitan)
- Commune
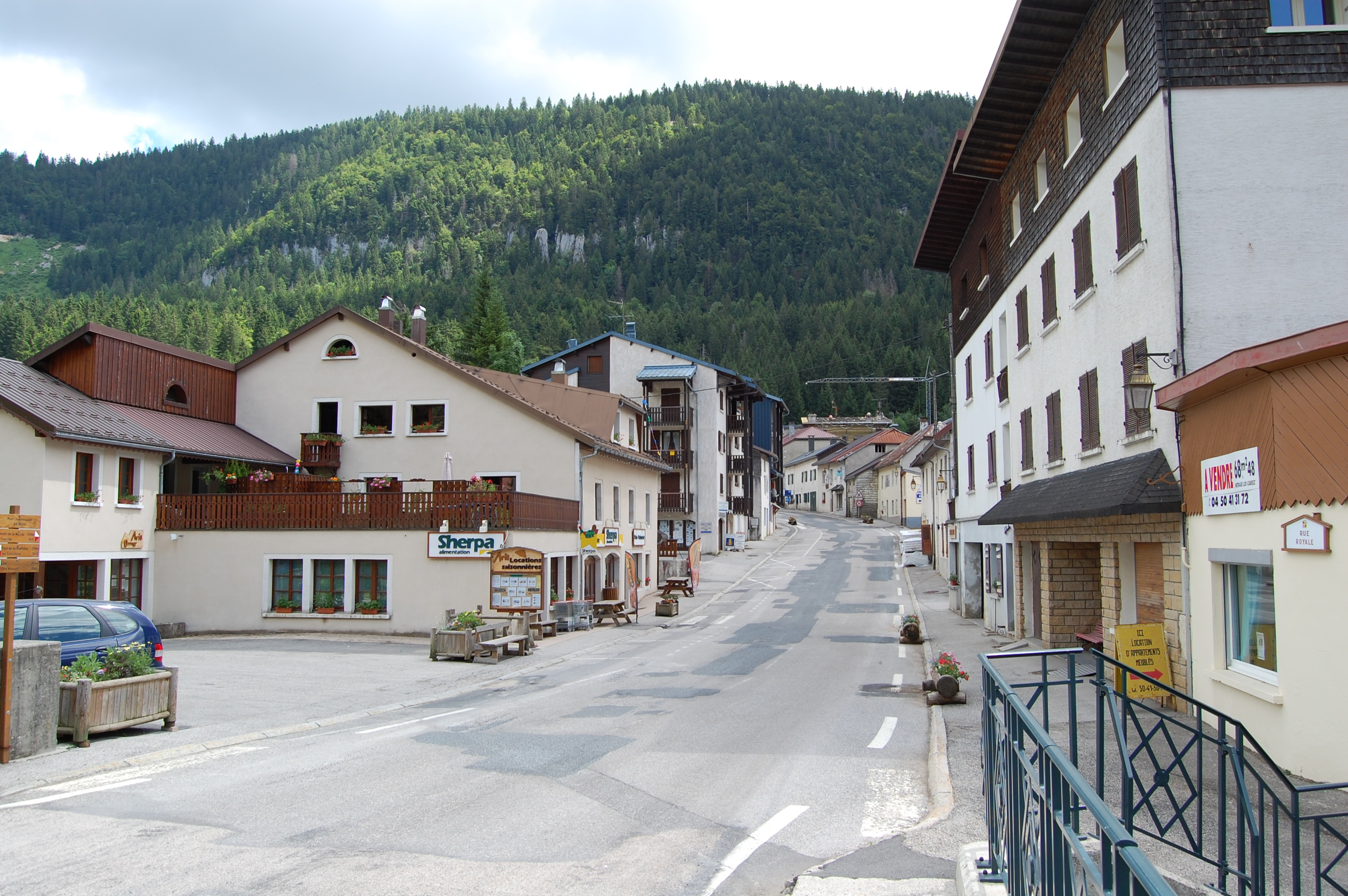

- Coat of arms
- Location of Mijoux
- Location within France Location within Auvergne-Rhône-Alpes
- Coordinates: 46°21′58″N 5°59′46″E
- Country: France
- Region: Auvergne-Rhône-Alpes
- Department: Ain
- Arrondissement: Gex
- Canton: Thoiry
- Intercommunality: CA Pays de Gex

Government
  - Mayor (2026–32): Martine Viallet
- Area^{1}: 22.00 km^{2} (8.49 sq mi)
- Elevation: 990 m (3,250 ft)
- Highest elevation: 1,614 m (5,295 ft)
- Lowest elevation: 866 m (2,841 ft)
- Population (2023): 299
  - Density: 13.6/km^{2} (35.2/sq mi)
- Time zone: UTC+01:00 (CET)
  - Summer (DST): UTC+02:00 (CEST)
- INSEE/Postal code: 01247 /01410
- ^{1} French Land Register data, which excludes lakes, ponds, glaciers > 1 km^{2} (0.386 sq mi or 247 acres) and river estuaries.

Mijoux (Arpitan: Mijor [mi.ˈðɔr]) is a commune and village in the Ain department in eastern France.

== Geography ==
The village is situated in the upper section of the narrow Valserine valley, nestled between high limestone cliffs to the south-east that form the first anticline of the Jura Mountains and the edge of the Lajoux plateau to the northwest. However, only the south-eastern side of the valley is within the commune's boundary, which stretches from the source of the Valserine river in the north, to the entry into Lélex, further down the valley, in the south. The commune is roughly 16 km long and 2 km wide.

Despite its high altitude (just under 1000 m), the village is built around a crossroads of regional importance: the valley road (D991) which links Bellegarde-sur-Valserine with Les Rousses here crosses the D936 which links Saint-Claude with Geneva over the Col de la Faucille. Both are former routes nationales.

== History ==
=== Origins ===
In 1334 the valley was declared common property and revenue was shared between Jean II de Rossillon and Hugues de Joinville, Sire of Gex. The agreement thereby struck up stated that a hospice should be paid for and built within the valley.

The hospice was inhabited by monks who were charged with caring for the poorest pilgrims visiting the tombs of the Saints of Condat in Saint-Claude. Most of the pilgrims were from Geneva or Savoy. This was the first building to be inhabited year-round in Mijoux.

=== The 15th to 18th centuries ===
Because of climate conditions within the valley that meant that winter was harsh and that spring was virtually nonexistent, the valley had remained uninhabited for a long time. However, due to the hospice, houses gradually appeared and work to clear the pines began so as to allow agriculture.

At first houses were built along the road that links Lajoux to the Col de la Faucille and it would not be until 1601 at the Treaty of Lyon that the river that bisects the town would become a border: the south-eastern side of the valley became French. In 1612 at the Franco-Spanish treaty, signed in Auxonne, the Valserine was chosen as the border between France and Spain. The north-western side of the valley was ceded to France in 1678 at the Treaties of Nijmegen.

=== The 19th century until today ===
At the Treaty of Paris in 1815, after Napoleon's downfall, the new border was defined, as it remains today: it passes along Mijoux's thin northern edge. The French customs, however, were set up along the Valserine as Mijoux, Lélex, Chézery-Forens and the Pays de Gex became a pays franc. Today, the Valserine river serves as the border between the regions of Franche-Comté and Auvergne-Rhône-Alpes, Mijoux lying within the latter for its most part.

During this time, the valley was inhabited by numerous families, whose jobs changed depending on the season. During the summer, tasks included collecting fodder for the livestock, cultivating barley and potatoes as well as collecting firewood. In winter, when the ground was covered in snow, the same families cut and polished gems.

However, the bloodshed of the Great War and the resulting economic crisis contributed to the abandonment of farms and a downturn in population levels that left the commune with only half the population it had had 50 years previously.

Today and since 1969, tourism is revitalising this village, mainly due to winter sports. The commune has, for the past 20 years, belonged to the Parc naturel régional du Haut-Jura.

== Population ==
Historical population
Year	Pop.	±% p.a.
1968	227	—
1975	191	−2.44%
1982	200	+0.66%
1990	258	+3.23%
1999	312	+2.13%
2007	384	+2.63%
2012	374	−0.53%
2017	341	−1.83%
2023	299	−2.17%
Source: INSEE

== Economy ==
Mijoux's economy is largely driven by tourism, for the winter sports practised here. Since 1999, Mijoux has been part of the Monts Jura ski resort. Ski lifts link Mijoux to the Col de la Faucille at 1308 m and to Mont Rond, at an altitude of 1543 m above sea level, one of the highest in the Jura Mountains. This part of the ski station is used mostly by downhill skiers. La Vattay, further up the valley but still within Mijoux, is a centre for cross-country skiing.

== Sights ==
- Col de la Faucille
- The archaeological site around the orientation tables at Montrond, a Monument historique since 1936.
- Pont Charlemagne over the Valserine, that Yolande of Valois crossed with her kidnappers in 1476 during a kidnapping by the Duke of Burgundy.
- Gemcutting museum.

== See also ==
- Communes of the Ain department
