= Thoiry, Ain =

Commune in Auvergne-Rhône-Alpes, France

Thoiry
- Commune
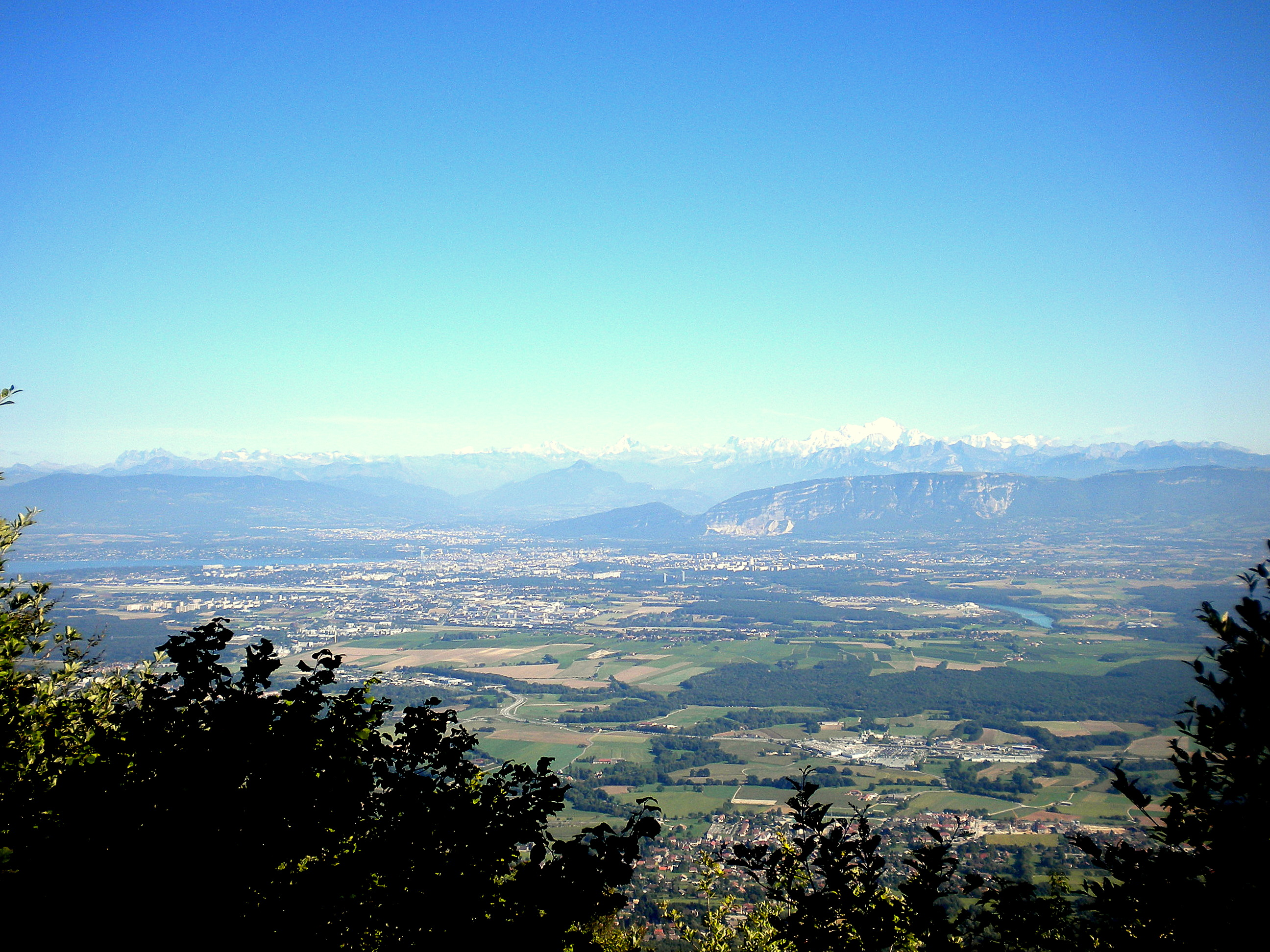
- Thoiry in the foreground, with Geneva, Annemasse and the Alps in the background

- Coat of arms
- Location of Thoiry
- Location within France Location within Auvergne-Rhône-Alpes
- Coordinates: 46°14′14″N 5°58′50″E
- Country: France
- Region: Auvergne-Rhône-Alpes
- Department: Ain
- Arrondissement: Gex
- Canton: Thoiry
- Intercommunality: CA Pays de Gex

Government
  - Mayor (2026–32): Muriel Bénier
- Area^{1}: 28.93 km^{2} (11.17 sq mi)
- Highest elevation: 1,720 m (5,640 ft)
- Lowest elevation: 400 m (1,300 ft)
- Population (2023): 6,569
  - Density: 227.1/km^{2} (588.1/sq mi)
- Time zone: UTC+01:00 (CET)
  - Summer (DST): UTC+02:00 (CEST)
- INSEE/Postal code: 01419 /01710
- ^{1} French Land Register data, which excludes lakes, ponds, glaciers > 1 km^{2} (0.386 sq mi or 247 acres) and river estuaries.

Thoiry (French pronunciation: [twaʁi]) is a commune in the Ain department in eastern France.

The little village was the scene of the September 1926 meeting between Aristide Briand of France and Gustav Stresemann of Germany. During the meeting the two discussed proposals for finally settling the various claims from the First World War, and their common interest in the then-fashionable paneuropean ideas. Ultimately, however, the meeting came to be a missed chance on the road to European integration, as neither statesman could carry domestic opinion with them on these issues.

The highest peak in the Jura Mountains, the Crêt de la Neige, is located in the commune.

== Population ==
Historical population

Year	Pop.	±% p.a.
1793	1,114	—
1800	1,178	+0.80%
1806	1,101	−1.12%
1821	1,183	+0.48%
1831	1,290	+0.87%
1836	1,435	+2.15%
1841	1,443	+0.11%
1846	1,499	+0.76%
1851	1,408	−1.24%
1856	1,423	+0.21%
1861	1,460	+0.51%
1866	1,423	−0.51%
1872	1,393	−0.35%
1876	1,356	−0.67%
1881	1,319	−0.55%
1886	1,295	−0.37%
1891	1,349	+0.82%
1896	1,356	+0.10%
1901	1,290	−0.99%

Year	Pop.	±% p.a.
1906	1,280	−0.16%
1911	1,202	−1.25%
1921	1,013	−1.70%
1926	1,076	+1.21%
1931	1,063	−0.24%
1936	1,077	+0.26%
1946	987	−0.87%
1954	1,091	+1.26%
1962	1,130	+0.44%
1968	1,438	+4.10%
1975	1,859	+3.74%
1982	2,112	+1.84%
1990	3,015	+4.55%
1999	4,063	+3.37%
2007	4,842	+2.22%
2012	5,733	+3.44%
2017	6,038	+1.04%
2023	6,569	+1.41%

Source: EHESS and INSEE (1968-2023)

== See also ==
- Communes of the Ain department
