= Treaty of Lausanne (disambiguation) =

The Treaty of Lausanne was a 1923 peace treaty between Turkey and its opponents of WWI.

Treaty of Lausanne may also refer to:

- Treaty of Ouchy or First Treaty of Lausanne, a 1912 peace treaty ending the Italo-Turkish War
- Treaty of Lausanne, a 1564 treaty in which Savoy officially ceded Vaud to Bern
