= Faux d'Enson =

Mountain in Switzerland

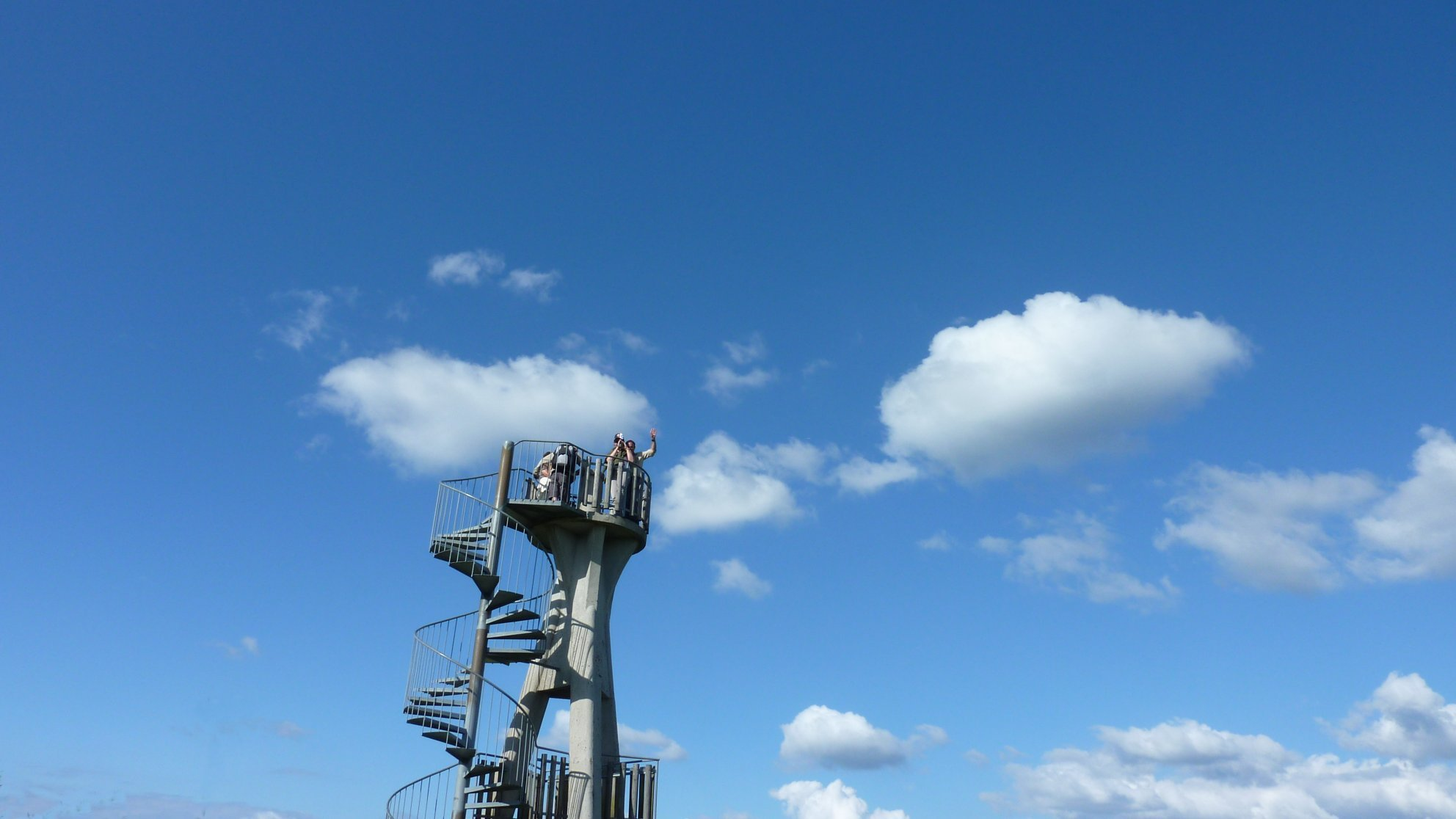

Highest point
- Elevation: 927 m (3,041 ft)
- Coordinates: 47°21′47″N 6°57′32″E

Geography
- Location within Switzerland
- Location: Jura, Switzerland
- Parent range: Jura Mountains

The Faux d'Enson is a mountain of the Jura, located south of Roche-d'Or in the canton of Jura. At an elevation of 927 m (3,041 ft) it is one of the highest summits in the region of Ajoie. An observation tower is located on the top.
