= Crêt de la Neige =

Mountain in France

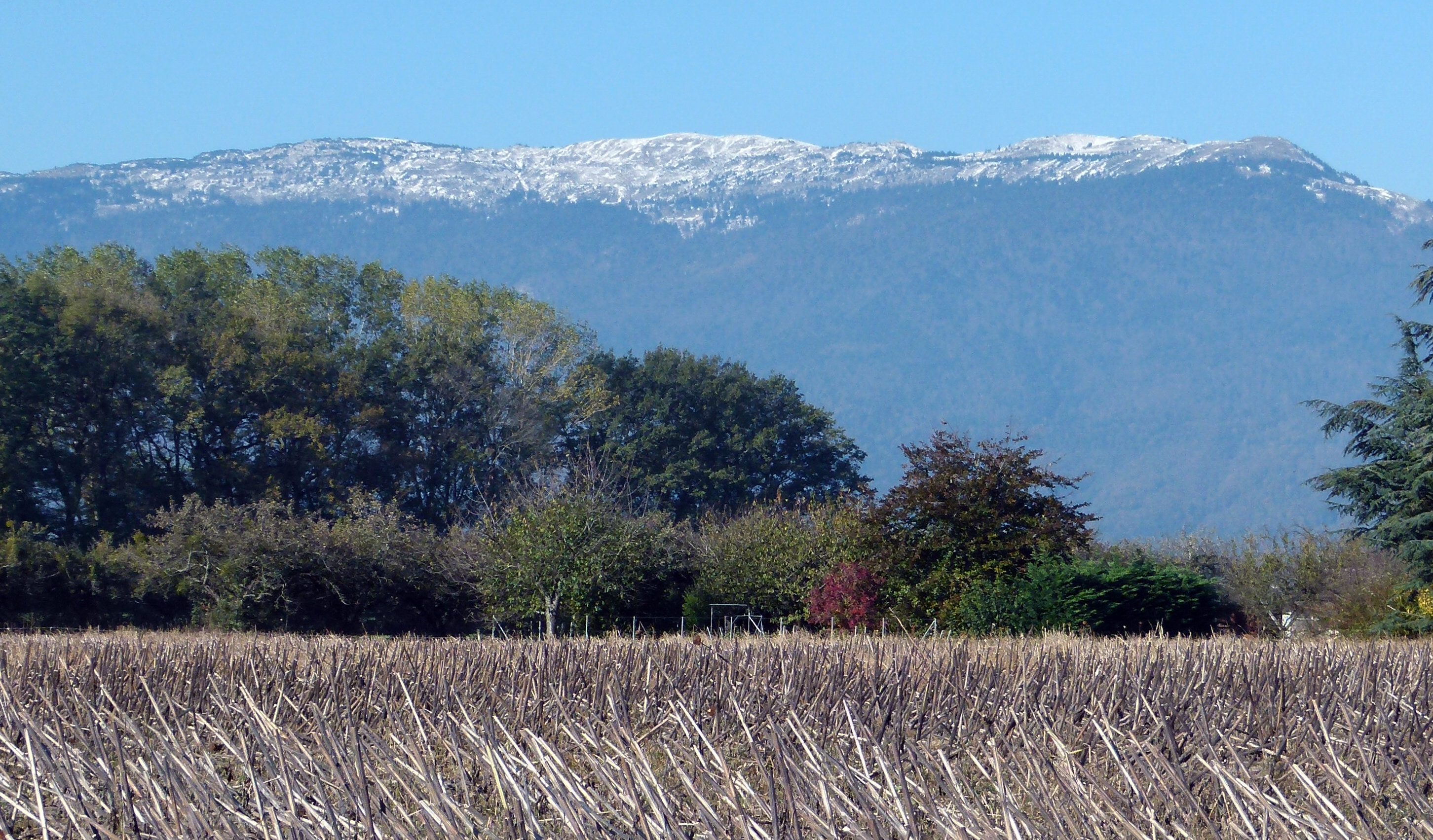
- Le Crêt de la Neige in Thoiry (Ain)

Highest point
- Elevation: 1,721 m (5,646 ft)
- Prominence: 1,266 m (4,154 ft)
- Parent peak: Mont Blanc
- Isolation: 41.3 km (25.7 mi)
- Listing: Ribu
- Coordinates: 46°16′15″N 5°56′22″E

Geography
- Location within France
- Location: Ain, Rhône-Alpes, France
- Parent range: Jura Mountains

The Crêt de la Neige (French pronunciation: [kʁɛ də la nɛʒ], "Snow Ridge") is the highest peak in the Jura Mountains and the department of Ain in France. Its elevation is 1720 m above sea level (reported as 1718 m before 2003). Its prominence is 1266 m. It is located in the commune of Thoiry. In 2024, a team of researchers located the actual highest peak in a protected area and measured its elevation at 1720.83 m, while they found the geodetic marker at Crêt de la Neige at 1718.06 m elevation.

The north and southern sides of the mountain are equipped with ski lifts, more specifically on the slopes of Montoisey. It is accessible through the communes of Thiory and Lelex.

The summit offers a 360º panoramic view over the Lake Geneva, the Valserine valley, La Dôle and the Alps. On a clear day, it is possible to see the Vosges mountains, found in France and the Black Forest, found in Germany.

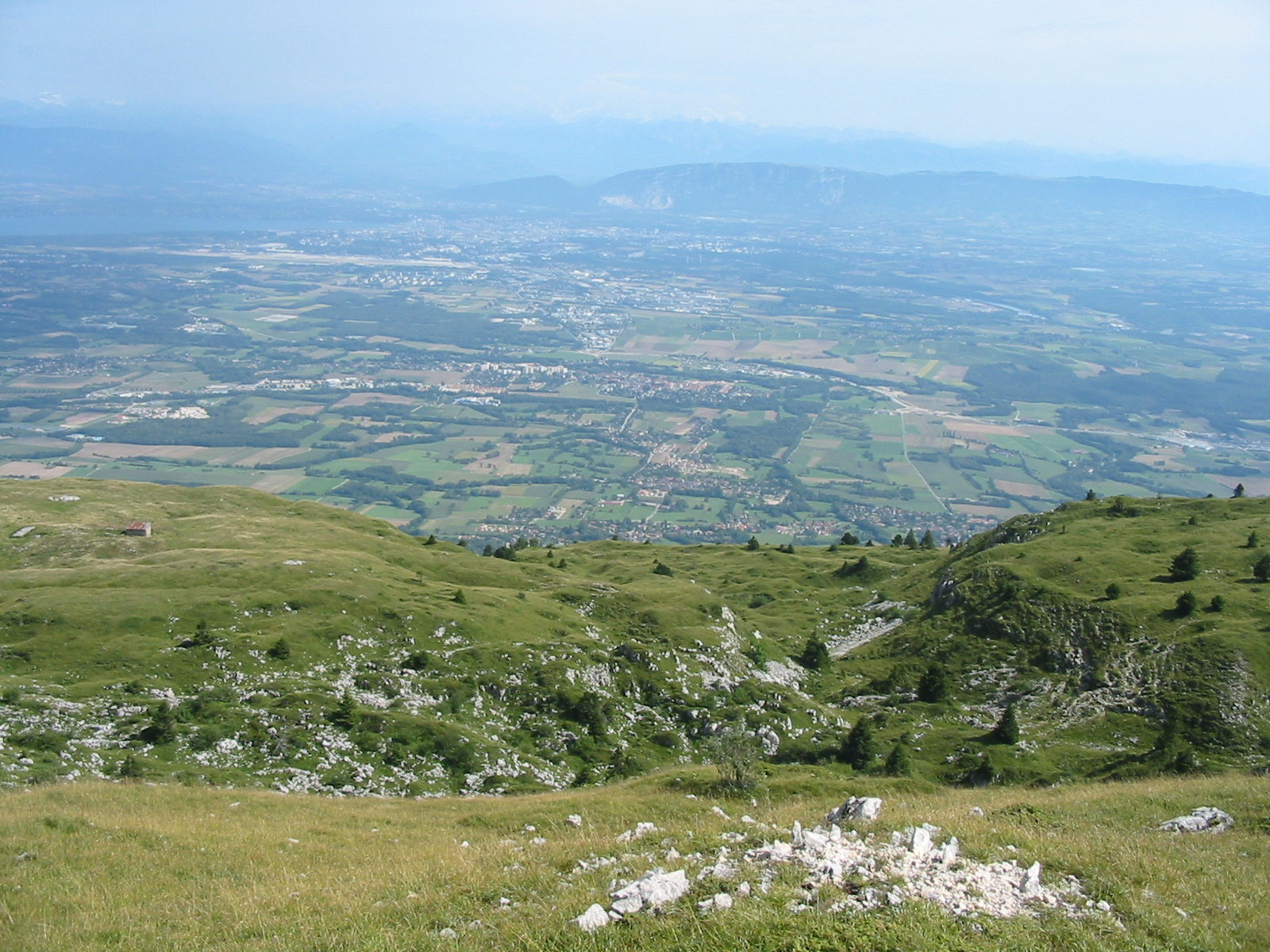
Looking towards Geneva from the summit

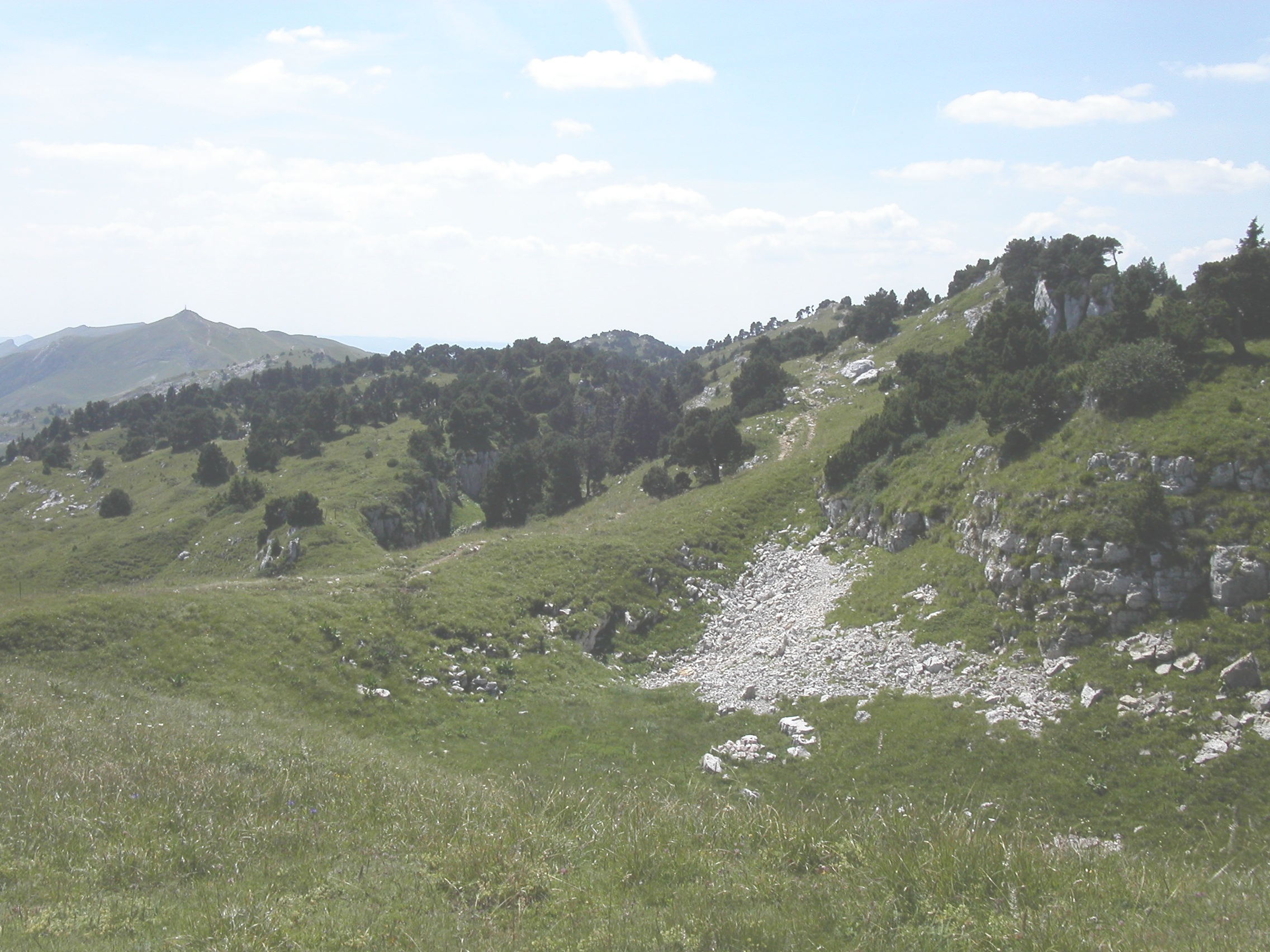
Summit of the Crêt de la Neige, with Le Reculet in the background
