= Mont Racine =

Mountain in Switzerland

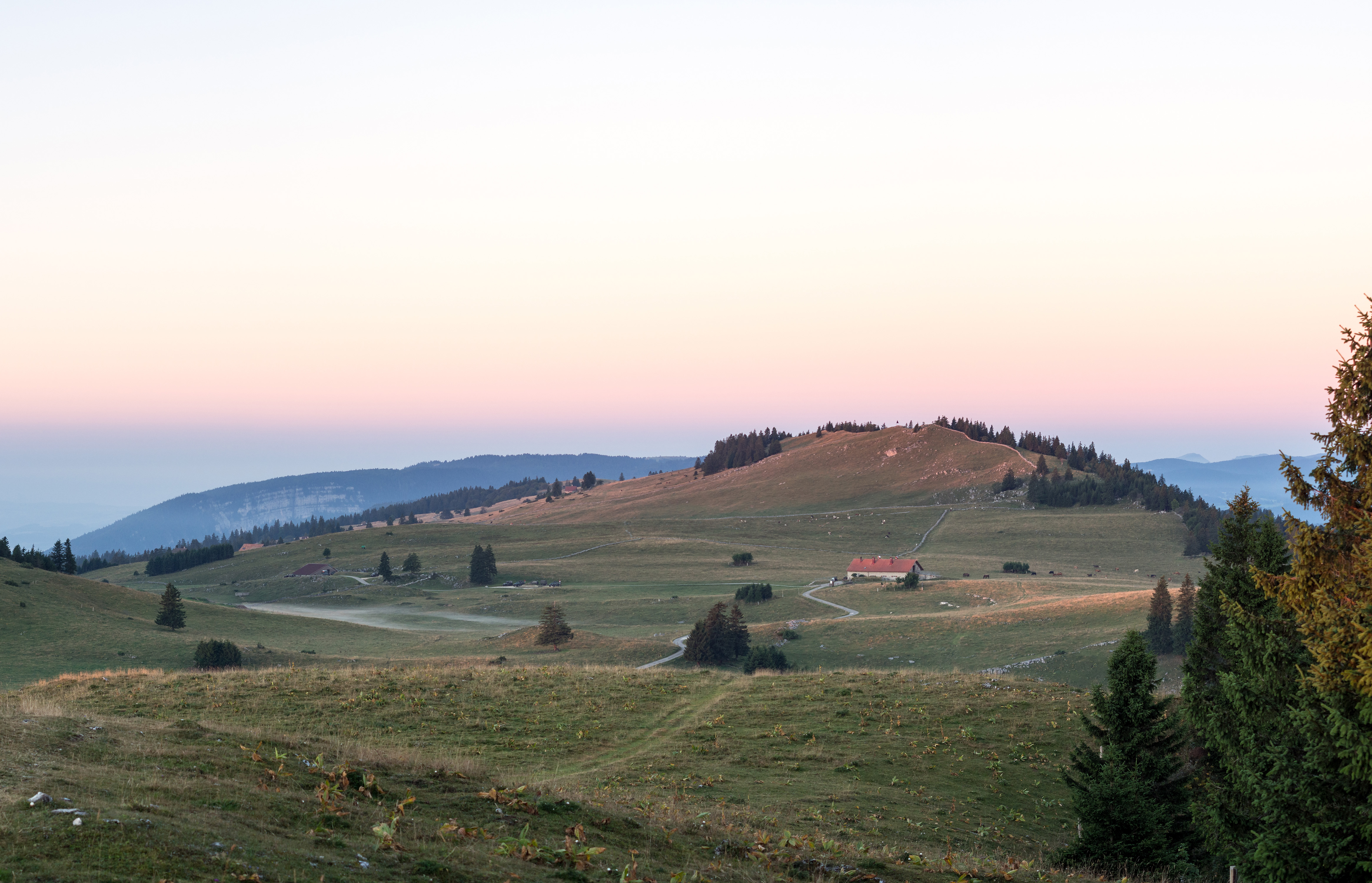
- View of Mont Racine at sunrise

Highest point
- Elevation: 1,439 m (4,721 ft)
- Prominence: 319 m (1,047 ft)
- Parent peak: Chasseral
- Isolation: 10.8 km (6.7 mi)
- Coordinates: 47°01′19″N 6°48′58″E

Geography
- Location within Switzerland
- Location: Neuchâtel, Switzerland
- Parent range: Jura Mountains

Mont Racine (1,439 m) is a peak in the Jura Mountains, located between La Sagne and Les Geneveys-sur-Coffrane in the canton of Neuchâtel.
