= Creux du Van =

Mountain cirque in Switzerland

Coordinates: 46°55′57″N 6°43′25″E

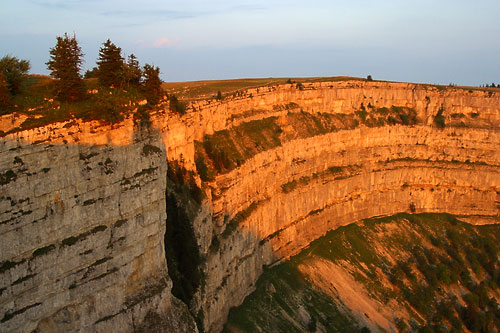
The Creux du Van

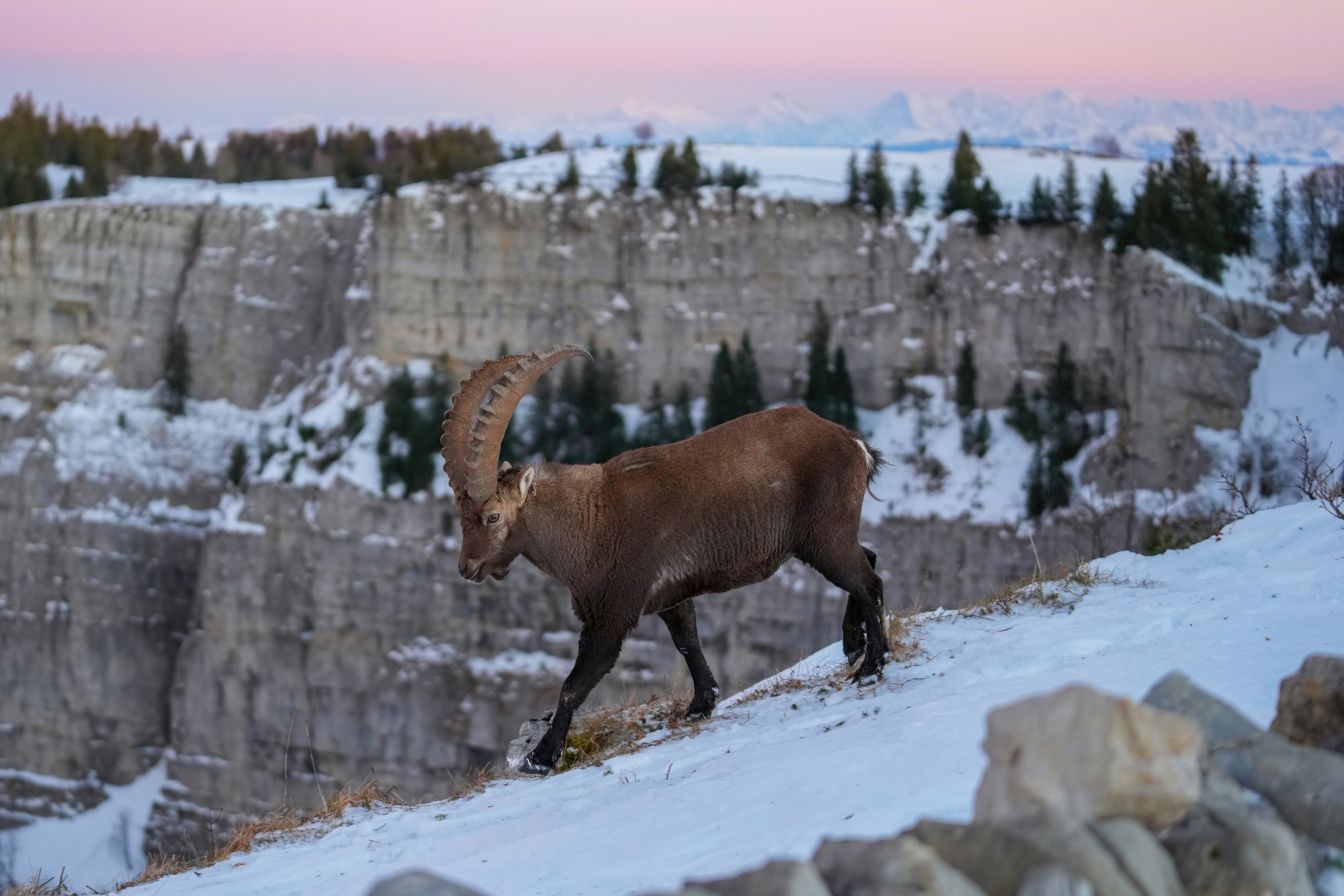
Wild Alpine Ibex and Swiss Alps at Creux du Van with snow during sunset

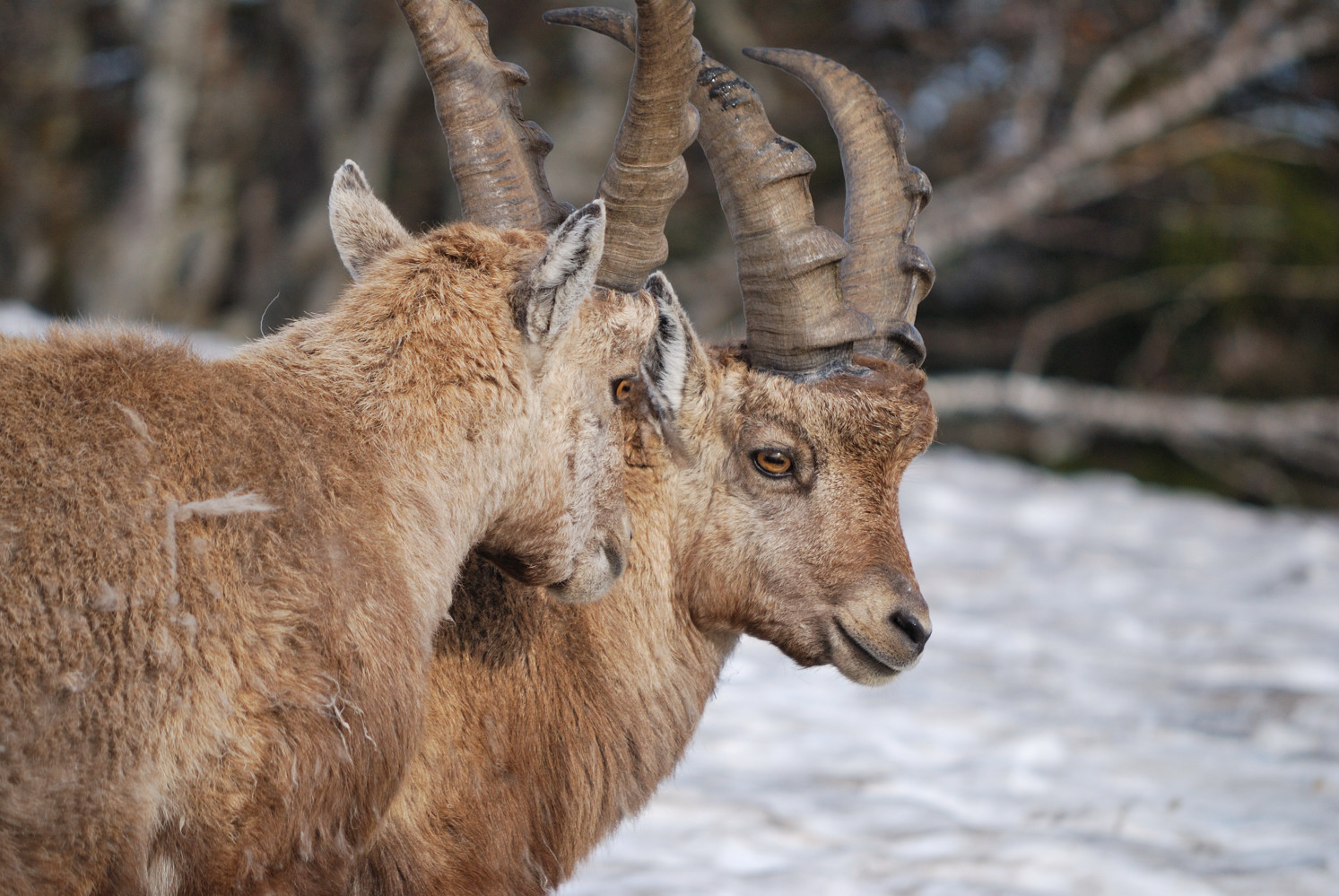
Alpine ibexes at the Creux du Van

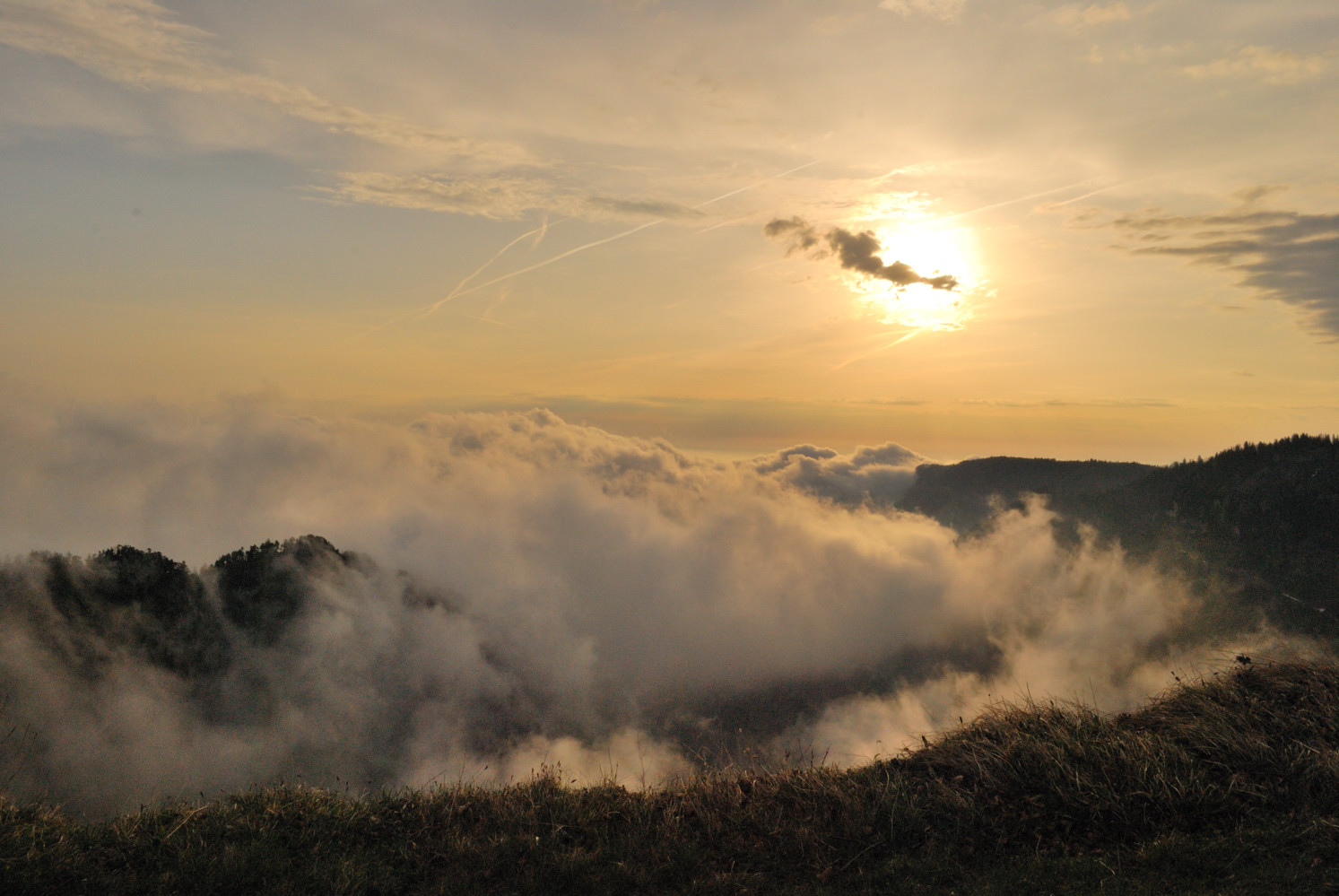
A picture of sunset taken at the summit of the Creux du Van.

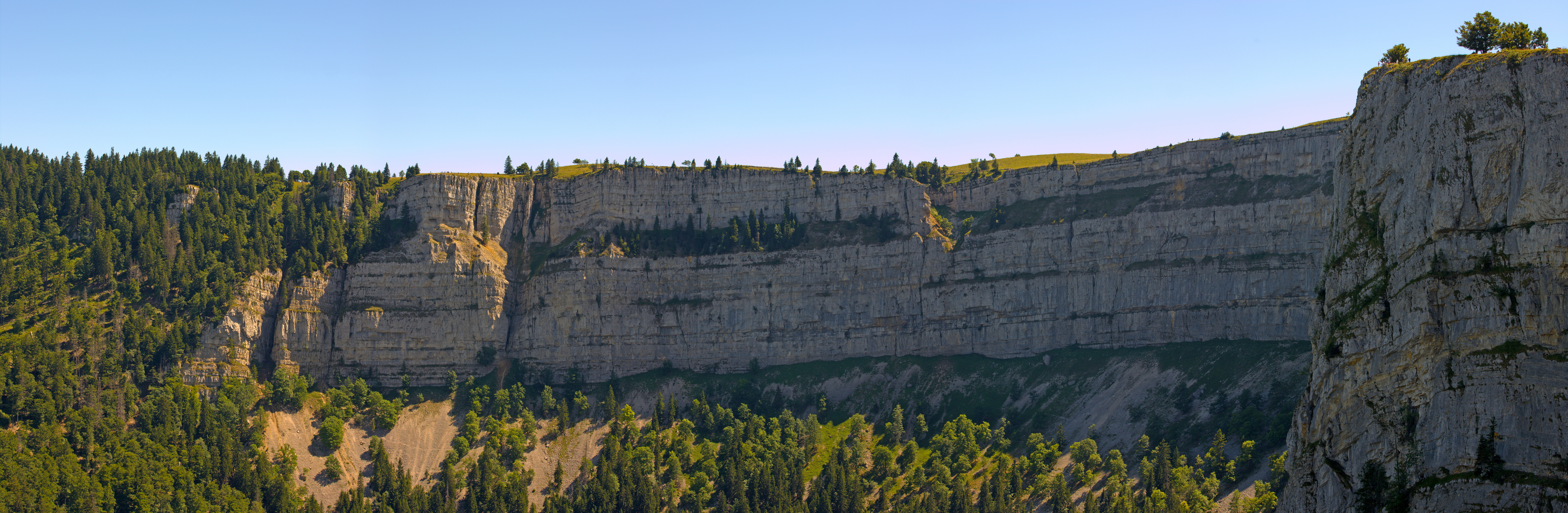

The Creux du Van is a natural rocky cirque approximately 1,400 metres (4,600 ft) wide and 150 metres (490 ft) deep, on the north side of Le Soliat, in the Val de Travers district in the Swiss canton of Neuchâtel. A very well known, amphitheatre-shaped natural attraction, it is at the heart of a nature reservation area of 15.5 km^{2} (6.0 sq mi).

== Geology ==
The rocky arc of Creux du Van was created in three phases:

- Phase 1: A glacier covered the area of today's Val de Travers around 140,000 years ago (Würm Ice Age). The stream of meltwater eroded material, making a V-shaped valley.
- Phase 2: During subsequent ice ages, other glaciers were created and hollowed out the valley. In warmer periods, the material was eroded by meltwater.
- Phase 3: After the removal of rocks from the fault, erosion of a stronger layer from a different age was much slower.

See cirque for a description of the process forming features like this.

The ground beneath the Creux du Van held permafrost until recently.(permafrost).

== Attraction ==
Ibex were introduced in the area in 1965. As of 2009, there are 17.

== Access ==
The summit area can be reached both on foot and by car. A paved road from Saint-Aubin-Sauges (on Lake Neuchâtel) or Couvet (Val-de-Travers) climbs to la ferme du Soliat at 1,382 m (4,534 ft), a few minutes walk away from the summit of the rocky cirque. Some hiking paths are signposted, via les petites Fauconnières.

Notable trails in the areas include:

- Le sentier des quatorze contours (the path of the 14 bends) starts at Noiraigue station (Val-de-Travers), with connections to Neuchâtel.
- Le sentier du Single leads to the summit directly from the area called La ferme Robert.
- Other unmarked paths allow access to the summit via la crête du Dos d'Ane or also from la Fontaine Froide via le Pertuis de Bise (a breach into the wall of rocks).

== Panorama ==
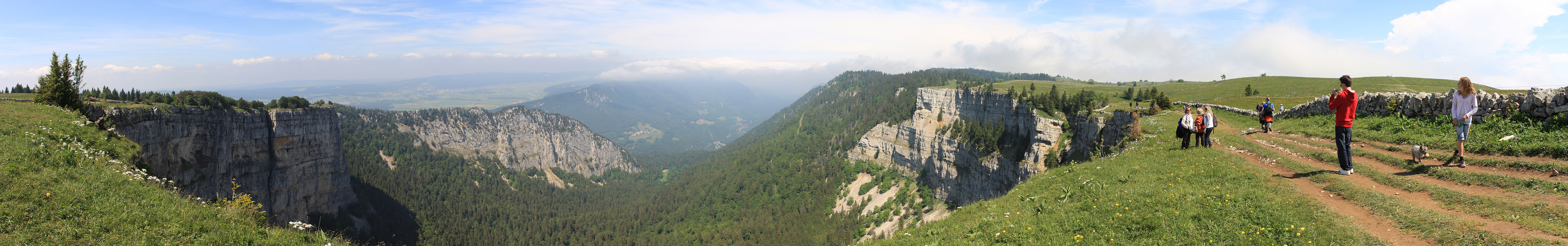
Panoramic view from the top

1467 Montagne de Bounty
