= Jura Mountains =

Mountain chain in Switzerland and France

- Jura Massif
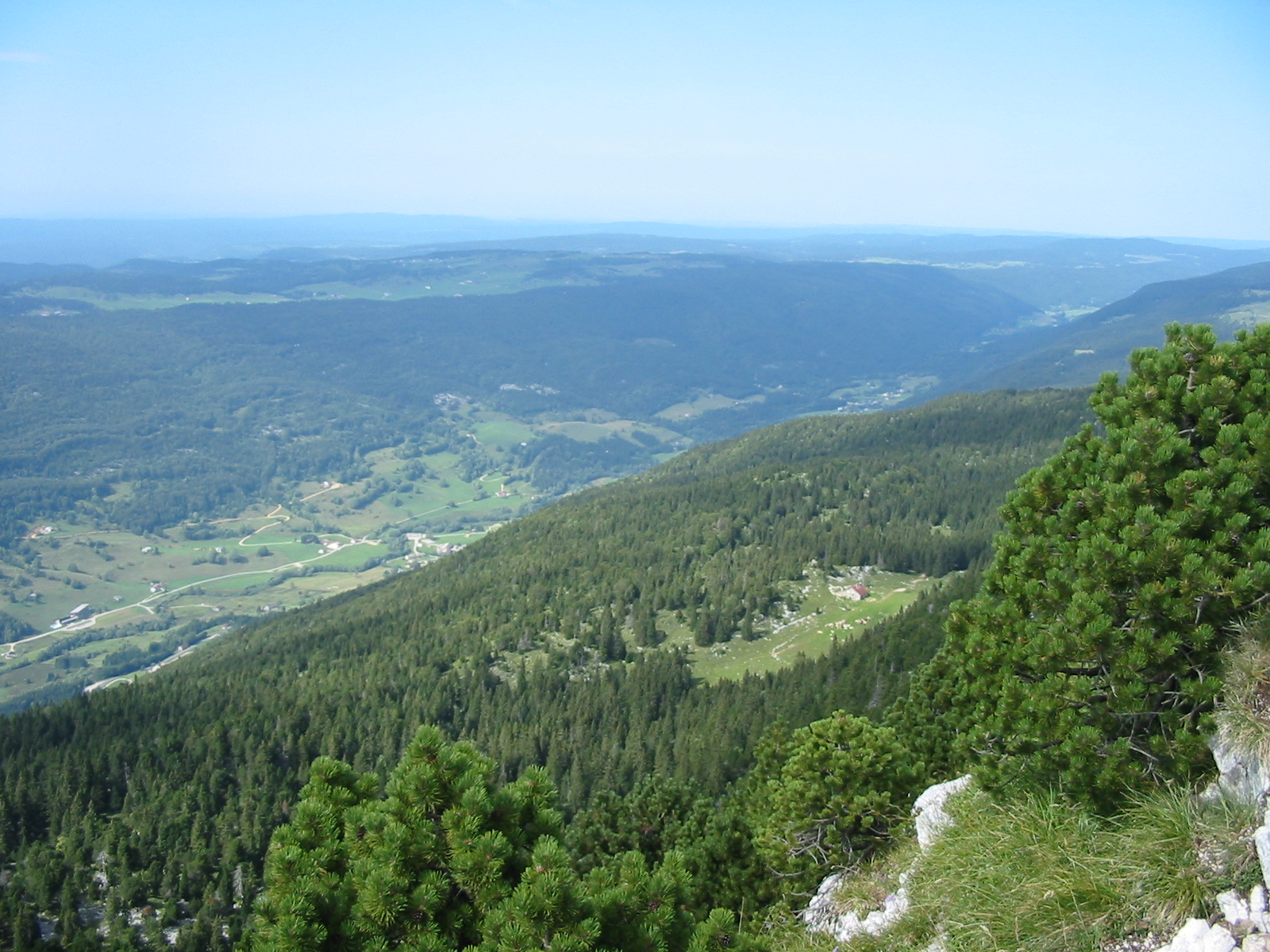
- View towards Lélex from near the Crêt de la Neige

Highest point
- Peak: Crêt de la Neige
- Elevation: 1,720 m (5,640 ft)
- Coordinates: 46°16′15″N 5°56′22″E

Geography
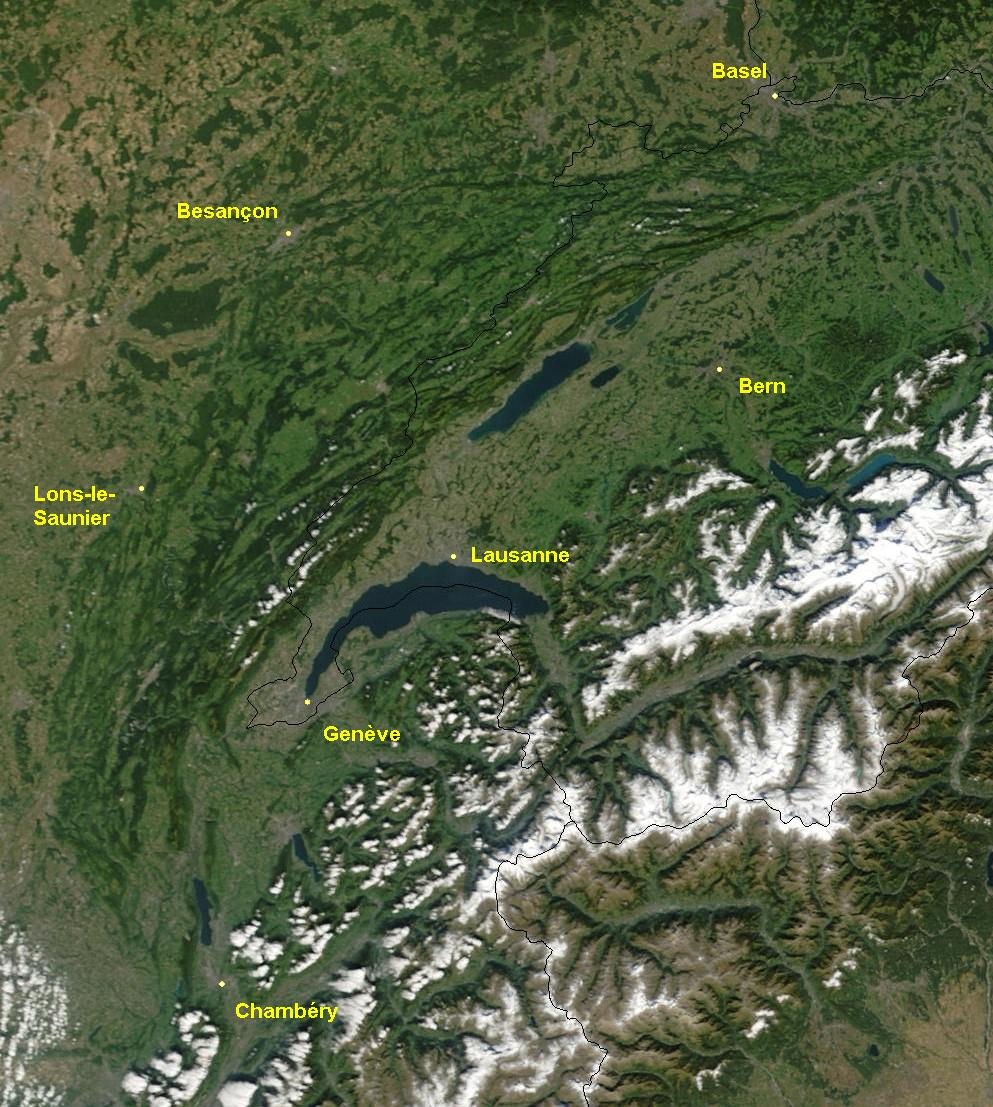
- Satellite image of the Jura Mountains (mostly dark green area in the upper left half of the image)
- Countries: France; Switzerland
- Regions/Cantons: Auvergne-Rhône-Alpes; Bourgogne-Franche-Comté; Grand Est; Geneva; Vaud; Neuchâtel; Jura; Bern; Solothurn; Basel-Landschaft; Aargau; Zurich
- Range coordinates: 46°40′N 6°15′E
Topo map(s)
Topographical map (relief map) of Switzerland showing the Jura range proper (Faltenjura) in the northwest and west, and the Alps in the south and east

The Jura Mountains (Jura Massif, /ˈdʒʊərə, ˈʒʊərə/ JOOR-ə, ZHOOR-ə) are a sub-alpine mountain range, a short distance north of the Western Alps, and mainly demarcate a long part of the French–Swiss border. While the Jura range proper ("folded Jura", Faltenjura) is located in France and Switzerland, the range continues northeastwards through northern Switzerland and Germany as the Table Jura ("not folded Jura", Tafeljura), which is crossed by the High Rhine.

== Name ==
The first use in English of the name was in 1829 in the Proceedings of Geological Society. The mountain range gives its name to the French department of Jura, the Swiss canton of Jura, the Jurassic period of the geologic timescale, and the Montes Jura of the Moon. It is also known as the Jura Massif.

It is first attested as mons Iura in book one of Julius Caesar's Commentarii de Bello Gallico. Strabo uses a Greek masculine form ὁ Ἰόρας ("through the Jura mountains", διὰ τοῦ Ἰόρα ὄρους) in his Geographica (4.6.11). Based on suggestions by Ferdinand de Saussure, early celticists such as Georges Dottin tried to establish an etymon "iura-, iuri" as a Celtic word for mountains, with similar putative etymologies (e.g. *juris, "mountainous forest") still appearing in more recent non-academic publications. However, since there are no clear cognates in the surviving corpus of the Celtic languages, modern studies of Proto-Celtic and Gaulish etymology tend not to list any lemmata connected to Jura, and the name must be considered fundamentally unclear.

== Physiography ==
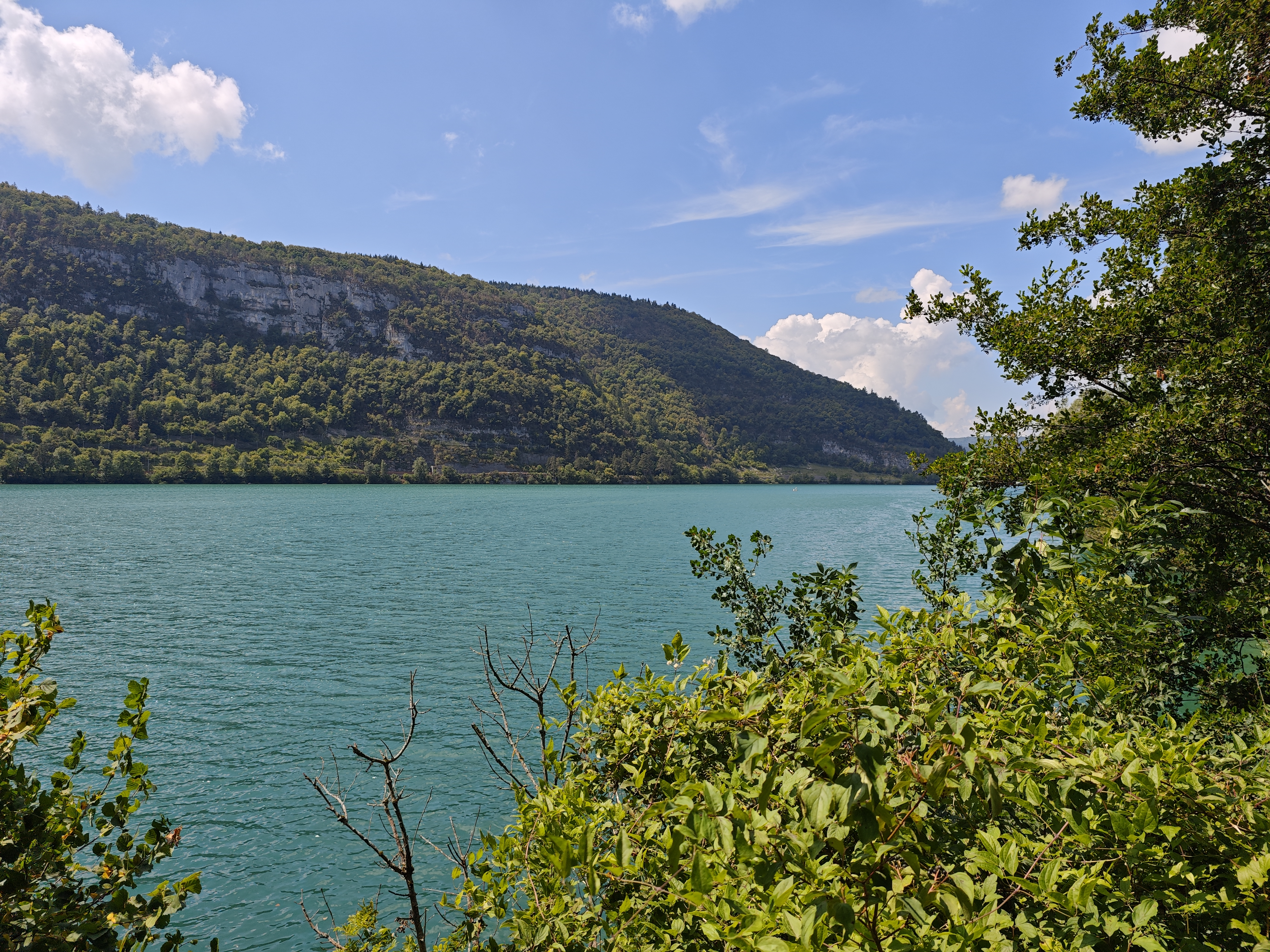
View of Lac Nantua in the French Jura Mountains

The Jura Mountains can be regarded as part of the larger Central European uplands, associated with the mountain building of the Alpine orogeny and the European portion of the Alpide belt. The Jura range proper lies in France and Switzerland.

In France, the Jura covers most of the Franche-Comté region, stretching south into the Rhône-Alpes region and north into the Grand Est region. The range reaches its highest point at the Crêt de la Neige (1,720 m (5,640 ft)), in department of Ain, 5 km (3.1 mi) west from the Swiss border of the canton of Geneva, and finds its southern terminus in the northwestern part of the department of Savoie. The north end of the Jura extends into the southern tip of Alsace (Sundgau). Roughly 1,600 km^{2} (600 sq mi) of the mountain range in France is protected by the Jura Mountains Regional Natural Park.

The Swiss Jura is one of the three distinct geographical regions of Switzerland, the others being the Swiss Plateau and the Swiss Alps. Most of the range covers the western border with France. In Switzerland, the Jura Mountains extend over an area covering (from northeast to southwest) the cantons of Zurich, Aargau, Basel-Landschaft, Solothurn, Jura, Bern (i.e., Bernese Jura), Neuchâtel, Vaud, and Geneva. The easternmost mountain of the Jura range proper is the Lägern, situated east of the river Aare. Much of the Swiss Jura region has no historical association with Early Modern Switzerland and was incorporated as part of the Swiss Confederacy only in the 19th century. In the 20th century, a movement for Jura separatism developed, which resulted in the creation of the Canton of Jura in 1979.

The east of the Jura range proper separates the Rhine and Rhône basins. The northern and eastern part of the range drains towards the Rhine river and its tributaries Aare and Ill, whereas the western and southern parts drain towards the Rhône river and its (sub)tributaries Doubs, Saône, and Ain. Initially the river Doubs (a subtributary of the Rhône) flows about 100 km (62 mi) northeast, briefly venturing into Switzerland, then changing direction and flowing about 170 km (110 mi) southwest before joining the Saône ca. 140 km (87 mi) north of the French city of Lyon. In Lyon, the Saône joins the Rhône. While the Rhine flows into the North Sea, the Rhône flows into the Mediterranean Sea.

Northeast, the Jura range proper (known as "folded Jura", Faltenjura) is continued as the Table Jura (Tafeljura). The Table Jura ranges (from southwest to northeast) across the Swiss cantons of Basel-Landschaft, Aargau, and Schaffhausen (Randen), and the southern German states of Baden-Württemberg and Bavaria (as Klettgau Jura, Baar Jura, and the Swabian and Franconian plateaus).

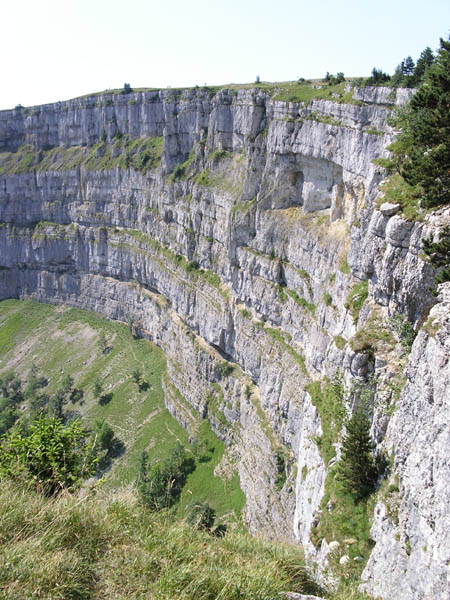
Creux du Van

=== Geology ===
The range is built up vertically while decreasing in size laterally (along a rough northwest–southeast line). This deformation accommodates the compression from alpine folding as the main Alpine orogenic front moves roughly northwards. The deformation becomes less pervasive away from the younger, more active Alpine mountain building.

The geologic folds comprise three major bands (lithological units) of building that date from three epochs: the Lias (Early Jurassic), the Dogger (Middle Jurassic) and the Malm (Late Jurassic) geologic periods. Each era of folding reveals effects of previously shallow marine environments as evidenced by beds with carbonate sequences, containing abundant bioclasts and oolitic divisions between layers (called horizons).

Structurally, the Jura consists of a sequence of geologic folds, the formation of which is facilitated by an evaporitic decollement layer. The box folds are still relatively young, which is evident by the general shape of the landscape showing that they have not existed long enough to experience erosion, thus revealing recent mountain building.

=== Main peaks ===
Altitude	Peak	Canton or Department
1720 m	Crêt de la Neige	France, Ain
1717 m	Le Reculet	France, Ain
1702 m	Grand Crêt	France, Ain
1688 m	Colomby de Gex	France, Ain
1679 m	Mont Tendre	Switzerland, Vaud
1677 m	La Dôle	Switzerland, Vaud
1621 m	Crêt de la Goutte	France, Ain
1614 m	Grand Montrond	France, Ain
1607 m	Chasseral	Switzerland, Bern
1607 m	Le Chasseron	Switzerland, Vaud
1597 m	Crêt du Milieu	France, Ain
1596 m	Mont Rond	France, Ain
1588 m	Le Suchet	Switzerland, Vaud
1584 m	Crêt du Miroir	France, Ain
1567 m	Le Noirmont	Switzerland, Vaud
1560 m	Aiguilles de Baulmes	Switzerland, Vaud
1546 m	Crêt du l’Éguillon	France, Ain
1545 m	Crêt de Chalam	France, Ain
1543 m	Petit Montrond	France, Ain
1540 m	Grand Colombier	France, Ain
1536 m	Crêt des Frasses	France, Ain
1528 m	La Barillette	Switzerland, Vaud
1504 m	Signal du Mont du Chat	France, Savoie
1495 m	Crêt Pela	France, Jura
1483 m	Dent de Vaulion	Switzerland, Vaud
1463 m	Mont d’Or	France, Doubs
1448 m	Crêt au Merle	France, Jura
1445 m	Hasenmatt	Switzerland, Solothurn
1439 m	Mont Racine	Switzerland, Neuchâtel
1425 m	Chaîne de l’Épine	France, Savoie
1419 m	Le Morond	France, Doubs
1395 m	Weissenstein (Röti)	Switzerland, Solothurn
1382 m	Mont Sujet	Switzerland, Bern
1323 m	Le Grand Taureau	France, Doubs

== Ecology ==
Some alpine butterfly populations have reduced markedly recently. Butterflies have been shown to be more vulnerable to climate change than birds. A study of three such alpine butterfly species over a period of the last glacial cycle suggests habitat loss and its deterioration are major drivers of this decline in population.

== Tourism ==
The Jura range offer a variety of tourist activities including hiking, cycling, downhill skiing and cross-country skiing. There are many signposted trails including the Jura ridgeway, a 310 km (190 mi) hiking route. Several peaks feature observation towers (e.g. Faux d'Enson, Hage).

Tourist attractions in the Swiss Jura include natural features such as the Creux du Van, lookout peaks such as the Chasseral, caves such as the Grottes de Vallorbe, as well as gorges such as Taubenloch. The Swiss Jura has been industrialized since the 18th century and became a major centre of the watchmaking industry. The area has several cities at very high altitudes, such as La Chaux-de-Fonds, Le Locle and Sainte-Croix (renowned for its musical boxes); however, it generally has had a marked decline in population since 1960. Both Le Locle and its geographical twin town La Chaux-de-Fonds are recognised as an UNESCO World Heritage Site for their horological and related cultural past.

In the French Jura, the 11th-century Fort de Joux, famously remodeled and strengthened by Vauban in 1690 and subsequently by other military engineers, is situated on a natural rock outcropping in the middle of the range not far from Pontarlier. Part of the A40 autoroute crosses through a portion of the southern Jura between Bourg-en-Bresse and Bellegarde-sur-Valserine, which is known as the "Highway of the Titans".

== See also ==
- Col de la Faucille
- Franconian Jura
- List of mountains in Switzerland
- Nature parks in Switzerland
- Rocher des Tablettes
- Swabian Jura
- Table Jura
- Geology of the Jura Massif
- Grotte de Cotencher
