= Puplinge =

- Municipality
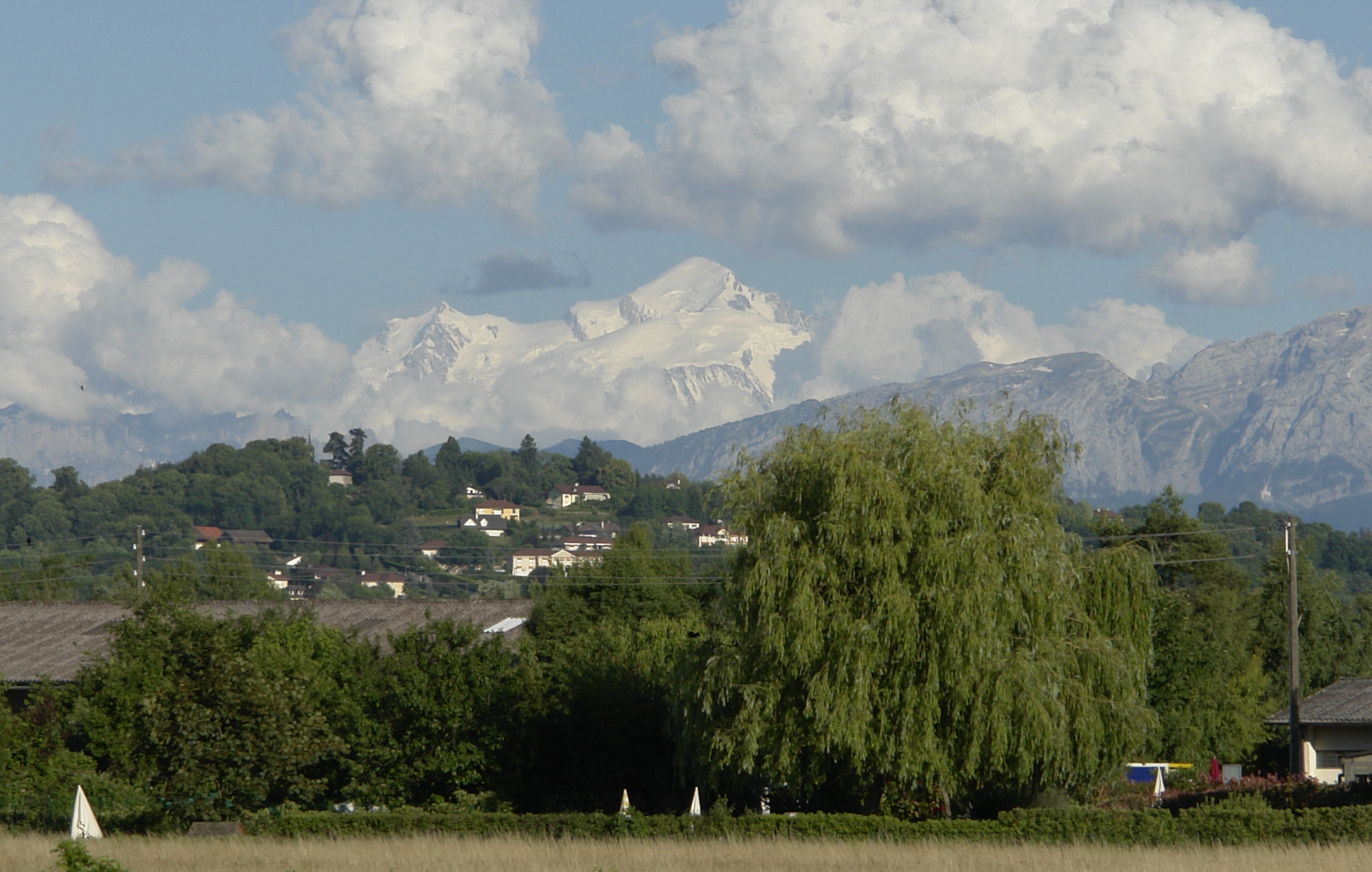

- Flag Coat of arms
- Location of Puplinge
- Location within Switzerland Location within Canton of Geneva
- Coordinates: 46°12′N 06°14′E
- Country: Switzerland
- Canton: Geneva
- District: n.a.

Government
  - Mayor: Maire; Michel Pitteloud

Area
  - Total: 2.67 km^{2} (1.03 sq mi)
- Elevation: 430 m (1,410 ft)

Population (December 2020)
  - Total: 2,488
  - Density: 932/km^{2} (2,410/sq mi)
- Time zone: UTC+01:00 (CET)
  - Summer (DST): UTC+02:00 (CEST)
- Postal code: 1241
- SFOS number: 6636
- ISO 3166 code: CH-GE
- Surrounded by: Ambilly (FR-74), Choulex, Presinge, Thônex, Vandœuvres, Ville-la-Grand (FR-74)
- Website: www.puplinge.ch

Puplinge is a municipality in the canton of Geneva in Switzerland.

== History ==
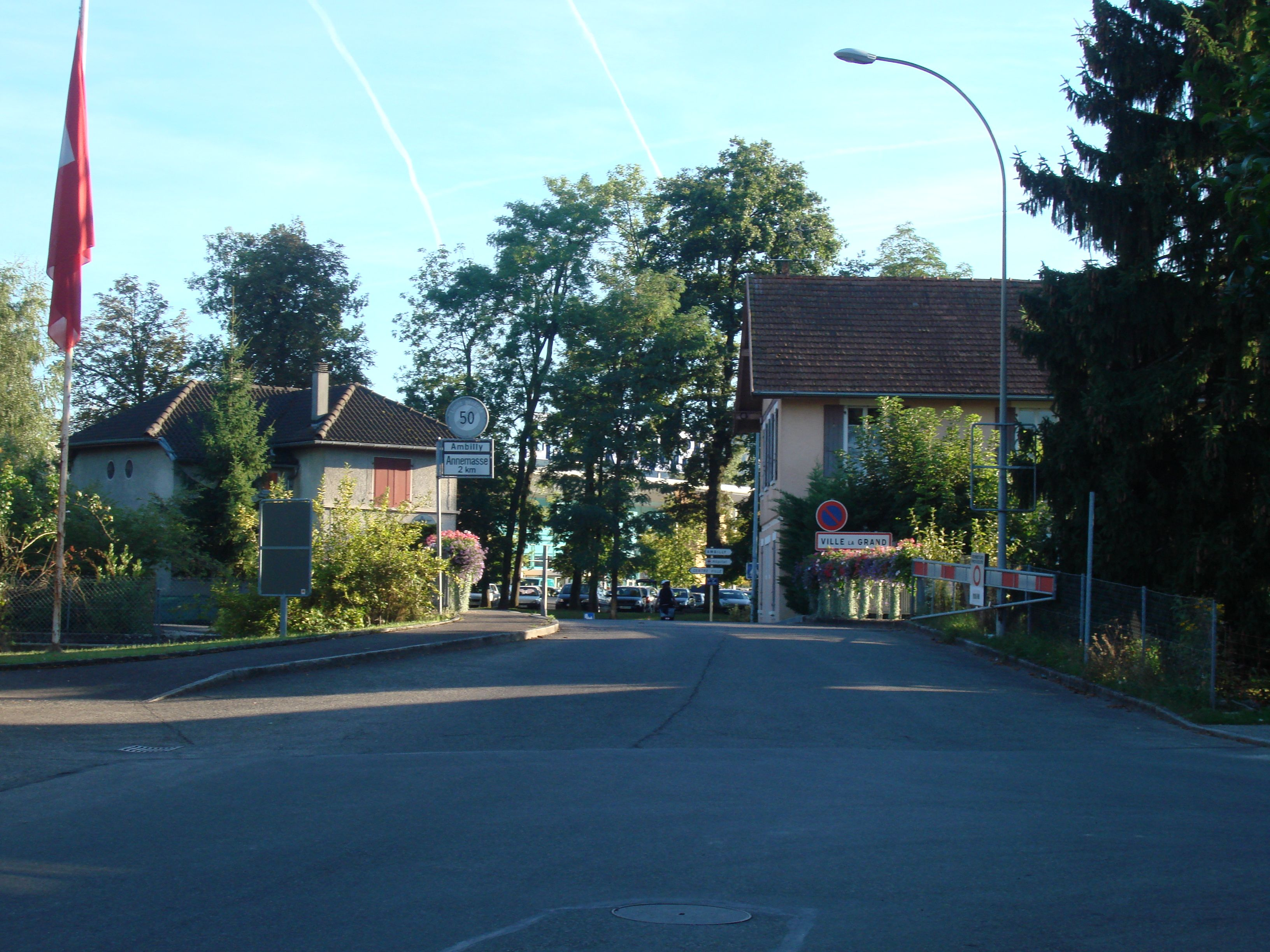
French-Swiss border between Puplinge and Ville La Grand

According to Pierre Bertrand, the village of Puplinge was part of ancient Burgundy and settled in 443 by 'le peuple germanique des Burgondes' The name of the village is derived from Old German and has since been modified to fit with French spelling conventions by adding an 'e' at the end. Bertrand further states that the names of the villages of Presinge, Puplinge, Corsinge, Merlinge, etc. 'tended to indicate an area of Germanic preponderance'.

It was part of the County of Geneva originated in the 10th century, in the Kingdom of Burgundy; in the domain of Aymar of Geneva, who married Bertha of Flanders, daughter of Baudouin III, count of Flanders, and died in 1016. The territory passed to the de Thoire et Villars family on the death of Count Robert (the Avignon Pope Clement VII) in 1394, was sold in 1400 to the Counts of Savoy. During the attempts by the Duke of Savoy to capture Geneva in 1602, Puplinge was part of the Savoy territory as an appendage as part of the Bailiwick of Gaillard. It was subsequently conceded to several Savoyard princes before being joined to the Duchy of Savoy in 1659.

Puplinge is first mentioned in 1573 as Puplinge.

Prior to 1860, it was part of the Ville-La-Grand commune of Savoy as the other half of Ville La Grand commune of France of the present times. As a result of the Treaty of Turin, signed on 16 March 1816, Savoy was annexed to France as agreed back in 1858 at Plombières-les-Bains dividing the commune between Switzerland and France and Puplinge was awarded to Switzerland along with Presinge. The duty-free zone north of a line defined by Saint-Genix-sur-Guiers, Le Châtelard, Faverges and Les Contamines-Montjoie created as result of the treaty ensured that the official French frontier was located a significant distance away from the actual frontier with Switzerland. Presinge, Puplinge and the hamlets of Cara, La Louviere, and Pesay Angle were combined to form a single municipality. In 1824, the first school building opened in the town.

In 1842, the first direct elections to the town council occurred. Due to long standing tensions between Presinge and Puplinge, on 9 November 1850 Puplinge and Presinge were split into two communes creating the present day borders of the municipality. The commune has swung between Protestantism and Catholicism based on the government in charge.

In 1924, the municipality received its coat of arms.

== Champ-Dollon Prison ==
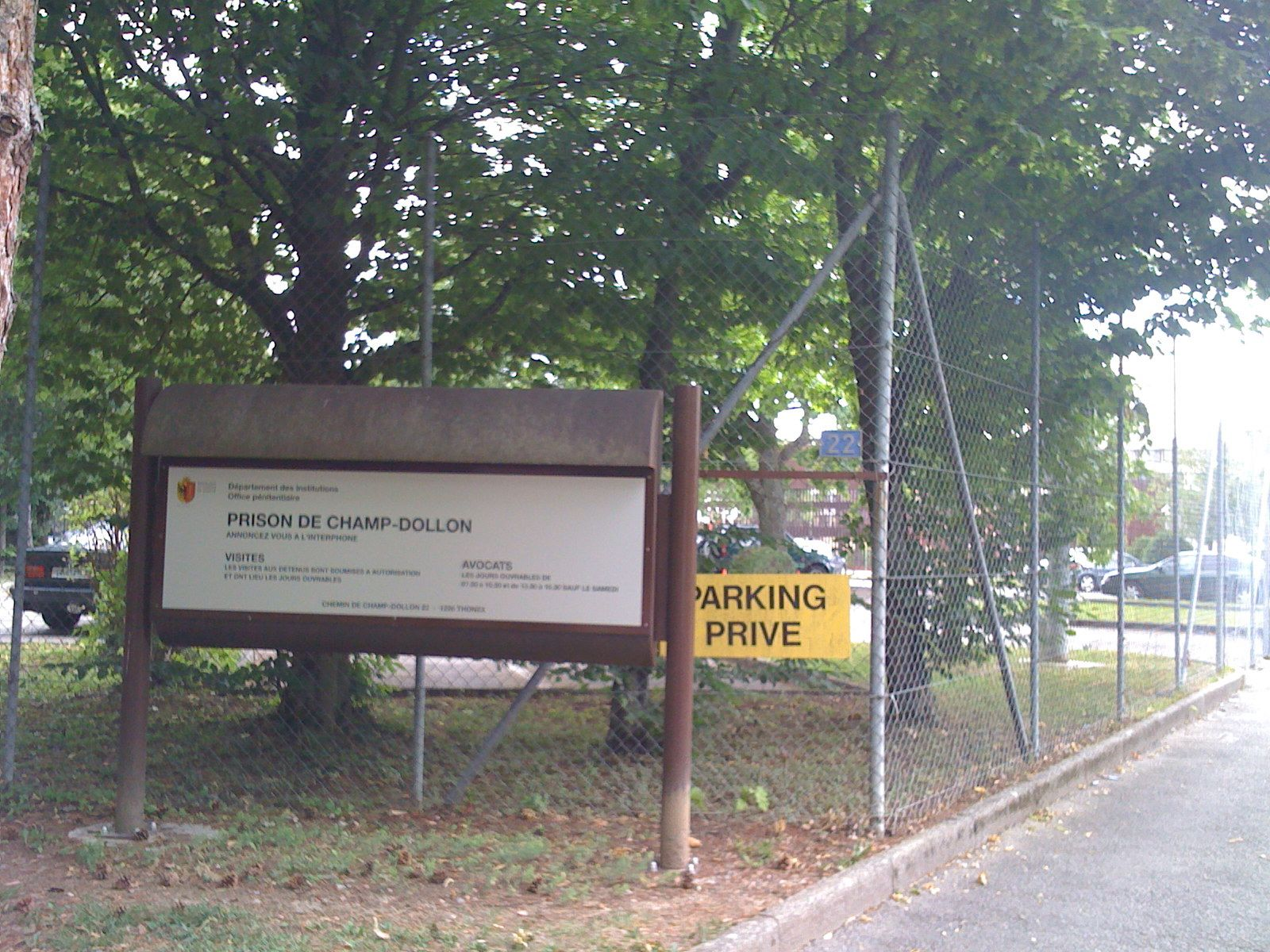
Champ-Dollon Prison

Approximately 1 km (0.62 mi) from the village, across the Route de Jussy lies the Maximum Security prison of Champ-Dollon, which is officially part of the municipality. It employs about 200 people and houses 500 inmates. It was built in 1977 to house 200 inmates. There are several controversies surrounding this prison. Over 60% of the prisoners are awaiting trial which has caused significant overcrowding. In 2006, the prison faced a mutiny of the inmates over the conditions as well as police brutality. Over 80% of the prisoners are of foreign origin.

== Geography ==
Puplinge has an area, as of 2009, of 2.66 square kilometers (1.03 sq mi). Of this area, 1.97 km^{2} (0.76 sq mi) or 74.1% is used for agricultural purposes, while 0.12 km^{2} (0.046 sq mi) or 4.5% is forested. Of the rest of the land, 0.55 km^{2} (0.21 sq mi) or 20.7% is settled (buildings or roads).

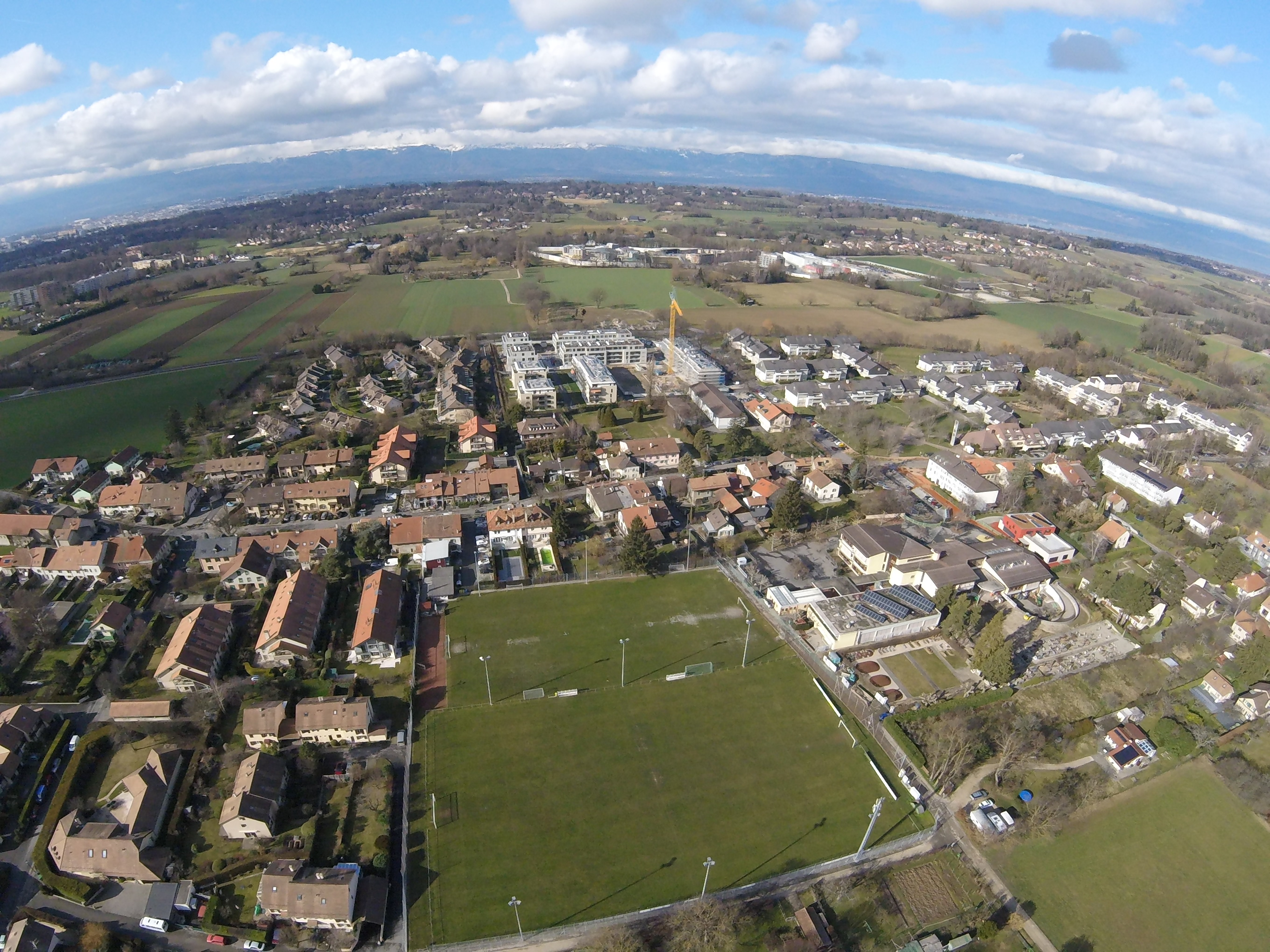
Puplinge, aerial view

Of the built up area, housing and buildings made up 13.2% and transportation infrastructure made up 5.6%. while parks, green belts and sports fields made up 1.5%. Out of the forested land, 0.8% of the total land area is heavily forested and 3.8% is covered with orchards or small clusters of trees. Of the agricultural land, 59.4% is used for growing crops and 6.8% is pastures, while 7.9% is used for orchards or vine crops.

The municipality is located on the left bank of the Rhone river. This municipality borders Ville la Grand commune in Haute-Savoie department in the Rhône-Alpes region in southeastern France. It consists of the linear village of Puplinge and the hamlets of Mon-Idée and Cornier. Apart from France, it is surrounded by other Swiss municipalities of Choulex, Presinge and Thônex.

The municipality of Puplinge consists of the sub-sections or villages of Dardelles, Champ-Dollon, Pesay and Puplinge - village.

== Demographics ==
Largest groups of foreign residents 2013
| Nationality | Amount | % total (population) |
|---|---|---|
| France | 107 | 5.2 |
| Italy | 58 | 2.8 |
| Portugal | 35 | 1.7 |
| Germany | 21 | 1.0 |
| UK | 19 | 0.9 |
| Spain | 15 | 0.7 |
| Netherlands | 13 | 1.6 |
| Canada | 11 | 0.5 |
| USA | 11 | 0.5 |
| Russia | 7 | 0.3 |

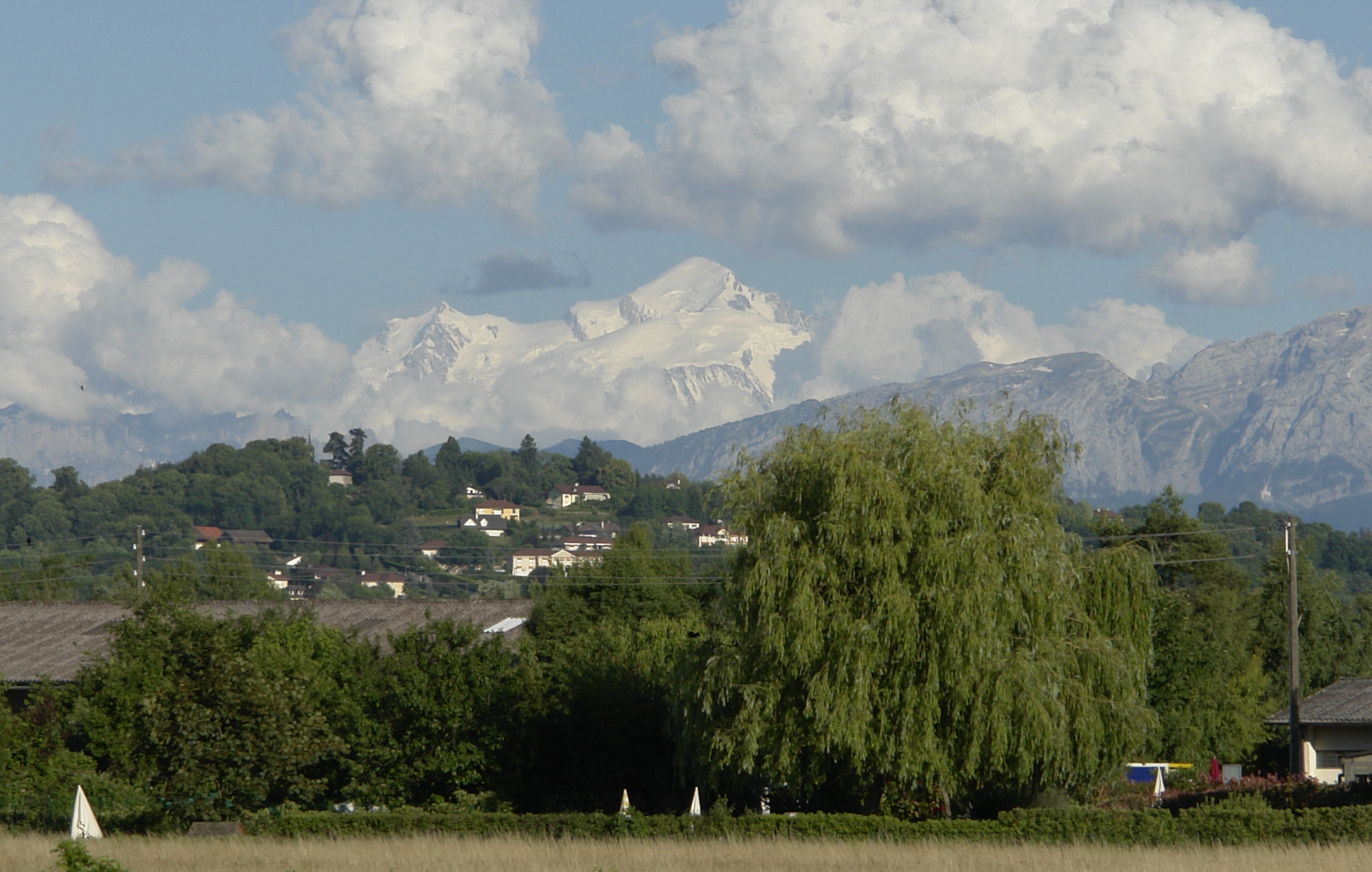
Mont-Blanc from Puplinge

Puplinge has a population (as of December 2020) of 2,488. As of 2008, 17.2% of the population are resident foreign nationals. Over the last 10 years (1999–2009 ) the population has changed at a rate of 0.9%. It has changed at a rate of -7.8% due to migration and at a rate of 8.4% due to births and deaths.

As of 2008, the gender distribution of the population was 47.3% male and 52.7% female. The population was made up of 771 Swiss men (37.9% of the population) and 191 (9.4%) non-Swiss men. There were 923 Swiss women (45.4%) and 150 (7.4%) non-Swiss women. Of the population in the municipality 426 or about 18.9% were born in Puplinge and lived there in 2000. There were 688 or 30.5% who were born in the same canton, while 364 or 16.1% were born somewhere else in Switzerland, and 514 or 22.8% were born outside of Switzerland.

In 2008 there were 19 live births to Swiss citizens and 6 births to non-Swiss citizens, and in same time span there were 4 deaths of Swiss citizens. Ignoring immigration and emigration, the population of Swiss citizens increased by 15 while the foreign population increased by 6. There were 8 Swiss men and 5 Swiss women who emigrated from Switzerland. At the same time, there were 6 non-Swiss men and 4 non-Swiss women who immigrated from another country to Switzerland. The total Swiss population change in 2008 (from all sources, including moves across municipal borders) was a decrease of 6 and the non-Swiss population increased by 11 people. This represents a population growth rate of 0.2%.

The age distribution of the population (as of 2000) is children and teenagers (0–19 years old) make up 25.2% of the population, while adults (20–64 years old) make up 66.4% and seniors (over 64 years old) make up 8.4%.

As of 2000, there were 1,010 people who were single and never married in the municipality. There were 1,030 married individuals, 62 widows or widowers and 156 individuals who are divorced.

As of 2000, there were 820 private households in the municipality, and an average of 2.5 persons per household. There were 237 households that consist of only one person and 62 households with five or more people. Out of a total of 837 households that answered this question, 28.3% were households made up of just one person and there were 2 adults who lived with their parents. Of the rest of the households, there are 196 married couples without children, 305 married couples with children. There were 72 single parents with a child or children. There were 8 households that were made up of unrelated people and 17 households that were made up of some sort of institution or another collective housing.

In 2000 there were 154 single family homes (or 52.9% of the total) out of a total of 291 inhabited buildings. There were 100 multi-family buildings (34.4%), along with 29 multi-purpose buildings that were mostly used for housing (10.0%) and 8 other use buildings (commercial or industrial) that also had some housing (2.7%). Of the single family homes 37 were built before 1919, while 7 were built between 1990 and 2000. The greatest number of single family homes (63) were built between 1981 and 1990. The most multi-family homes (42) were built between 1971 and 1980 and the next most (22) were built between 1996 and 2000.

In 2000 there were 836 apartments in the municipality. The most common apartment size was 4 rooms of which there were 271. There were 41 single room apartments and 215 apartments with five or more rooms. Of these apartments, a total of 802 apartments (95.9% of the total) were permanently occupied, while 24 apartments (2.9%) were seasonally occupied and 10 apartments (1.2%) were empty. As of 2009, the construction rate of new housing units was 0 new units per 1000 residents. The vacancy rate for the municipality, in 2010, was 0.23%.

The historical population is given in the following chart:

== Politics ==
In the 2007 federal election the most popular party was the SVP which received 21.27% of the vote. The next three most popular parties were the Green Party (20.19%), the LPS Party (17.53%) and the SP (15.76%). In the federal election, a total of 652 votes were cast, and the voter turnout was 49.4%.

In the 2009 Grand Conseil election, there were a total of 1,318 registered voters of which 598 (45.4%) voted. The most popular party in the municipality for this election was the Les Verts with 19.0% of the ballots. In the canton-wide election they received the second highest proportion of votes. The second most popular party was the Libéral (with 17.7%), they were first in the canton-wide election, while the third most popular party was the MCG (with 14.5%), they were also third in the canton-wide election.

For the 2009 Conseil d'État election, there were a total of 1,314 registered voters of which 698 (53.1%) voted.

In 2011, all the municipalities held local elections, and in Puplinge there were 17 spots open on the municipal council. There were a total of 1,513 registered voters of which 756 (50.0%) voted. Out of the 756 votes, there were 14 blank votes, 7 null or unreadable votes and 56 votes with a name that was not on the list.

=== Local government ===
Like all municipalities in the canton of Geneva, the political authorities of Puplinge consist of an Administrative Council (Conseil administratif) headed by a mayor as executive and a Municipal Council (Conseil municipal), composed of three and twenty-seven citizens respectively, elected for four years. The local government is responsible for providing services such as primary education, social services, public transportation, and tax collection. The primary source of income is direct taxes.

Puplinge also has the distinction of being 7th in the country for the highest number of registered Green Party of Switzerland (PES) voters with 20.2% of all voters indicating their preference for PES in 2007.

The elections are scheduled once every 4 years. Swiss citizens and foreigners residing in the Canton of Geneva for eight years or more are eligible to vote. The current mayor is Michel Pitteloud and the Deputy Mayor is Gilles Marti.

== Language ==
The official language spoken in Puplinge is French. However until the mid-17th century, Franco-Provençal (called Romand in Switzerland) was a common patois in the region. Vestiges of the Franco-Provençal language only survive in street names in and around the villages of Suisse Romande today. After the ratification of the treaty by the Duchy of Savoy on 4 March 1540 making French the only official language, use of all patois declined and survived only in agricultural terms and in isolated towns. Modern-day Switzerland does not recognize Franco-Provençal (Romand) as one of its official languages.

It is speculated that the Ligurian language was spoken in pre-Roman times in this region. Very little is known about this language which is believed to have been Indo-European in origin.

Most of the population (as of 2000) speaks French (1,877 or 83.1%), with German being second most common (99 or 4.4%) and English being third (75 or 3.3%). There are 30 people who speak Italian and 1 person who speaks Romansh.

== Economy ==
The commune is mostly a bedroom community for the city of Geneva with most residents commuting to Geneva and nearby towns. There is also a vibrant farming culture. The local vineyards produce grapes for winemaking at the Chateau Du Crest. There are no industries or commercial centers in the village.

As of 2010, Puplinge had an unemployment rate of 3.1%. As of 2008, there were 34 people employed in the primary economic sector and about 9 businesses involved in this sector. 36 people were employed in the secondary sector and there were 12 businesses in this sector. 407 people were employed in the tertiary sector, with 37 businesses in this sector. There were 1,120 residents of the municipality who were employed in some capacity, of which females made up 45.7% of the workforce.

In 2008 the total number of full-time equivalent jobs was 448. The number of jobs in the primary sector was 26, of which 14 were in agriculture and 12 were in forestry or lumber production. The number of jobs in the secondary sector was 33 of which 10 or (30.3%) were in manufacturing and 24 (72.7%) were in construction. The number of jobs in the tertiary sector was 389. In the tertiary sector; 27 or 6.9% were in wholesale or retail sales or the repair of motor vehicles, 2 or 0.5% were in the movement and storage of goods, 13 or 3.3% were in a hotel or restaurant, 2 or 0.5% were the insurance or financial industry, 28 or 7.2% were technical professionals or scientists, 10 or 2.6% were in education and 3 or 0.8% were in health care.

In 2000, there were 323 workers who commuted into the municipality and 956 workers who commuted away. The municipality is a net exporter of workers, with about 3.0 workers leaving the municipality for every one entering. About 8.0% of the workforce coming into Puplinge are coming from outside Switzerland, while 0.0% of the locals commute out of Switzerland for work. Of the working population, 18.6% used public transportation to get to work, and 61.3% used a private car.

== Religion ==
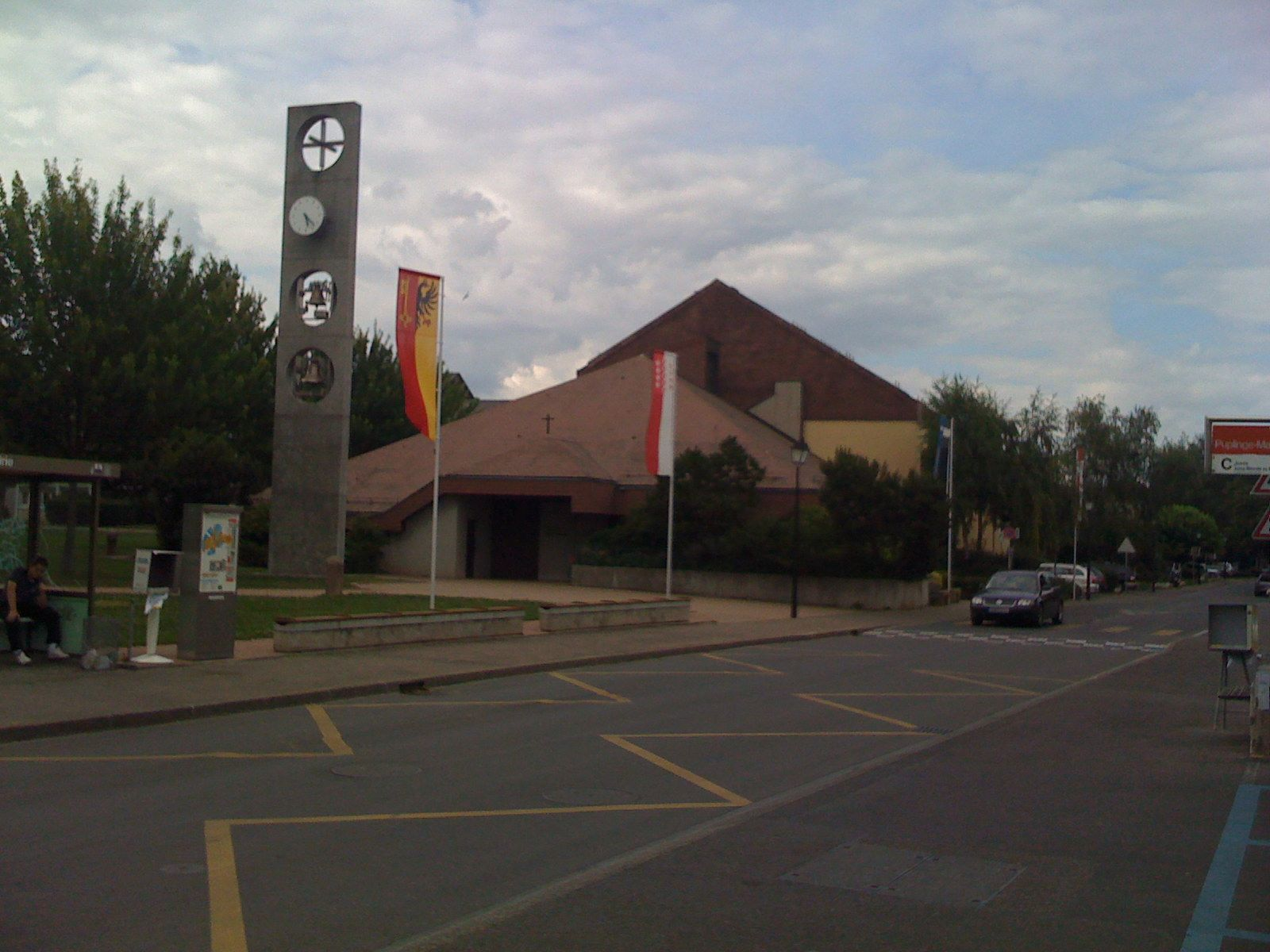
The new church in Puplinge

From the 2000 census, 884 or 39.1% were Roman Catholic, while 433 or 19.2% belonged to the Swiss Reformed Church. Of the rest of the population, there were 18 members of an Orthodox church (or about 0.80% of the population), there were 8 individuals (or about 0.35% of the population) who belonged to the Christian Catholic Church, and there were 31 individuals (or about 1.37% of the population) who belonged to another Christian church. There were 12 individuals (or about 0.53% of the population) who were Jewish, and 15 (or about 0.66% of the population) who were Islamic. There was 1 person who was Buddhist, 2 individuals who were Hindu and 2 individuals who belonged to another church. 504 (or about 22.32% of the population) belonged to no church, are agnostic or atheist, and 348 individuals (or about 15.41% of the population) did not answer the question.

== Education ==
In Puplinge about 703 or (31.1%) of the population have completed non-mandatory upper secondary education, and 482 or (21.3%) have completed additional higher education (either university or a Fachhochschule). Of the 482 who completed tertiary schooling, 44.6% were Swiss men, 35.1% were Swiss women, 11.8% were non-Swiss men and 8.5% were non-Swiss women.

During the 2009–2010 school year there were a total of 452 students in the Puplinge school system. The education system in the Canton of Geneva allows young children to attend two years of non-obligatory Kindergarten. During that school year, there were 35 children who were in a pre-kindergarten class. The canton's school system provides two years of non-mandatory kindergarten and requires students to attend six years of primary school, with some of the children attending smaller, specialized classes. In Puplinge there were 71 students in kindergarten or primary school and 4 students were in the special, smaller classes. The secondary school program consists of three lower, obligatory years of schooling, followed by three to five years of optional, advanced schools. There were 71 lower secondary students who attended school in Puplinge. There were 119 upper secondary students from the municipality along with 31 students who were in a professional, non-university track program. An additional 40 students attended a private school.

As of 2000, there were 14 students in Puplinge who came from another municipality, while 222 residents attended schools outside the municipality.
