= Jean-Louis Micheli =

Swiss publicist and translator (1812-1875)

- Born: December 16, 1812; Geneva, France
- Died: March 30, 1875 (aged 62); Geneva, Switzerland
- Education: University of Geneva, University of Jena
- Occupations: Publicist, translator, mayor
- Spouse: Pauline Marguerite Revilliod (m. 1842)
- Children: 3

Jean-Louis Micheli (16 December 1812 – 30 March 1875) was a Swiss publicist and translator of German and English writings. He served as mayor of Jussy for over two decades and was active in various religious and philanthropic societies in Geneva.

== Early life and education ==
Jean-Louis Micheli was the son of François-Jules Micheli, a deputy to the Representative Council of Geneva, and Anne Louise Marguerite née Labat. He belonged to a wealthy branch of the Micheli family, which had exercised seigneurial rights over Jussy for several generations and owned the Château du Crest. His grandfather was Jean-Louis Micheli du Crest.

In 1824, Micheli entered the Collège de Genève, then followed preparatory courses at the Academy of Geneva, where he began law studies in 1831 and became a member of the Société suisse de Zofingue. After completing his doctoral thesis entitled La tutelle des enfants naturels (The Guardianship of Natural Children) in 1835, he obtained his lawyer's certificate. He traveled through Germany and studied literature at the University of Jena for one semester in 1836. He then stayed in Paris, followed by Great Britain, where he visited hospitals and prisons (1837-1838). For health reasons, he made several cure stays in Rome and Montreux until the early 1840s.

== Personal life ==
In 1842, Micheli married Pauline Marguerite Revilliod of Cologny, with whom he had three children. The family spent their winters in the city of Geneva and their summers on their estate in Jussy.

== Political and administrative career ==
In 1842, Micheli became mayor of Jussy, a position he held until 1865. Additionally, from 1842 he directed a primary school in Geneva for about twenty years. In 1846, as a member of the government militia, he was called to fight insurgents in the city of Geneva. After the fall of the Restoration regime, he sat in the Grand Council of Geneva for the conservatives, now in the minority, from 1846 to 1848.

== Religious and philanthropic activities ==
Micheli engaged with various societies, for which he wrote reports and commentaries. In 1845, he joined the Bible Society and was a member from 1851 to 1875 of the Société genevoise des publications religieuses (SGPR), a philanthropic organization. This society was directed almost exclusively by conservative pastors and lawyers and was considered the bastion of old intellectual and Protestant Geneva, opposed to the radicalism led by James Fazy. Micheli was first co-editor, then co-editor-in-chief (1860-1864) of the SGPR's publication, Semaine religieuse, an anti-Catholic weekly that was probably created at the instigation of the Company of Pastors of Geneva.

== Literary career ==
As a student, Micheli contributed to the Album littéraire, a journal kept by fellow students. Later, he worked as a journalist and literary critic, and translated and adapted writings published previously in publications such as Etrennes religieuses or within the framework of the Bible Society. From 1853, he translated works from English and German, including texts by John S.C. Abbott in 1856 and Johann A. Miertsching in 1857. He also authored biographies (including one of Isaac Newton in 1861), stories "imitated from English" based on British prose literature (Tom, le jeune épicier, 1864; Catherine Rollier, 1866), as well as articles for the Bibliothèque universelle, directed by Joël Cherbuliez, and the Journal de Genève.

Micheli notably adapted the novel Jacobs, des Handwerksgesellen, Wanderungen durch die Schweiz (1847) by Jeremias Gotthelf, the pseudonym of Emmental pastor Albert Bitzius. Entitled in French Le tour de Jacob le compagnon, published in 1854 with the support of the SGPR, this was his only translation of a work by Gotthelf.

== Death ==
Jean-Louis Micheli died on 30 March 1875 in Geneva.

== Works ==
- Les amies des pauvres, de Hambourg, ou exercice chrétien de la bienfaisance (1844)
- Le tour de Jacob le compagnon (1854) - French adaptation of Jeremias Gotthelf's work
- Isaac Newton (1861) - biography
- Tom, le jeune épicier (1864)
- Catherine Rollier (1866)
- Récits du dimanche (1875) - collection of ten short stories
- Notes généalogiques sur la famille Micheli (written 1851-1867)
