= Meinier =

- Municipality
- Flag Coat of arms
- Location of Meinier
- Location within Switzerland Location within Canton of Geneva
- Coordinates: 46°14′N 06°14′E
- Country: Switzerland
- Canton: Geneva
- District: n.a.

Government
  - Mayor: Administrative councillors Marc Jaquet, Simona Korff, Enrico Castelli

Area
  - Total: 6.96 km^{2} (2.69 sq mi)
- Elevation: 435 m (1,427 ft)

Population (December 2020)
  - Total: 2,115
  - Density: 304/km^{2} (787/sq mi)
- Time zone: UTC+01:00 (CET)
  - Summer (DST): UTC+02:00 (CEST)
- Postal code: 1252
- SFOS number: 6629
- ISO 3166 code: CH-GE
- Surrounded by: Choulex, Collonge-Bellerive, Corsier, Gy, Jussy, Presinge
- Website: www.meinier.ch

Meinier is a municipality of the Canton of Geneva, Switzerland.

== History ==
Meinier is first mentioned in 1153 as de maniaco. Around 1344 it was mentioned as Meignier.

== Geography ==
Meinier has an area, as of 2009, of 6.96 square kilometers (2.69 sq mi). Of this area, 5.6 km^{2} (2.2 sq mi) or 80.5% is used for agricultural purposes, while 0.23 km^{2} (0.089 sq mi) or 3.3% is forested. Of the rest of the land, 1.03 km^{2} (0.40 sq mi) or 14.8% is settled (buildings or roads), 0.03 km^{2} (7.4 acres) or 0.4% is either rivers or lakes and 0.08 km^{2} (20 acres) or 1.1% is unproductive land.

Of the built up area, housing and buildings made up 6.6% and transportation infrastructure made up 5.3%. while parks, green belts and sports fields made up 1.9%. Out of the forested land, 1.7% of the total land area is heavily forested and 1.6% is covered with orchards or small clusters of trees. Of the agricultural land, 57.8% is used for growing crops and 5.7% is pastures, while 17.0% is used for orchards or vine crops. All the water in the municipality is in lakes.

The municipality is located on the left bank of Lake Geneva. It consists of the hamlets of Meinier, Carre d'Amont, Carre d'Aval (Le Carre), Compois, Essert and Corsinge.

The municipality of Meinier consists of the sub-sections or villages of Meinier - Pallanterie, Meinier - Essert, Meinier - village, Covéry, Corsinge, Compois, Carre-d'Aval and Carre-d'Amont.

== Demographics ==
Meinier has a population (as of December 2020) of 2,115. As of 2008, 18.8% of the population are resident foreign nationals. Over the last 10 years (1999–2009 ) the population has changed at a rate of 8.6%. It has changed at a rate of 1.5% due to migration and at a rate of 6.2% due to births and deaths.

Most of the population (as of 2000) speaks French (1,461 or 86.1%), with English being second most common (68 or 4.0%) and German being third (62 or 3.7%). There are 24 people who speak Italian and 2 people who speak Romansh.

As of 2008, the gender distribution of the population was 48.2% male and 51.8% female. The population was made up of 726 Swiss men (38.7% of the population) and 178 (9.5%) non-Swiss men. There were 781 Swiss women (41.7%) and 189 (10.1%) non-Swiss women. Of the population in the municipality 425 or about 25.1% were born in Meinier and lived there in 2000. There were 490 or 28.9% who were born in the same canton, while 282 or 16.6% were born somewhere else in Switzerland, and 440 or 25.9% were born outside of Switzerland.

In 2008 there were 14 live births to Swiss citizens and 1 birth to non-Swiss citizens, and in same time span there were 6 deaths of Swiss citizens. Ignoring immigration and emigration, the population of Swiss citizens increased by 8 while the foreign population increased by 1. There were 7 Swiss men and 4 Swiss women who emigrated from Switzerland. At the same time, there were 3 non-Swiss men and 3 non-Swiss women who immigrated from another country to Switzerland. The total Swiss population change in 2008 (from all sources, including moves across municipal borders) was a decrease of 9 and the non-Swiss population increased by 17 people. This represents a population growth rate of 0.4%.

The age distribution of the population (as of 2000) is children and teenagers (0–19 years old) make up 25.5% of the population, while adults (20–64 years old) make up 62.5% and seniors (over 64 years old) make up 12%.

As of 2000, there were 683 people who were single and never married in the municipality. There were 827 married individuals, 69 widows or widowers and 117 individuals who are divorced.

As of 2000, there were 691 private households in the municipality, and an average of 2.4 persons per household. There were 217 households that consist of only one person and 58 households with five or more people. Out of a total of 714 households that answered this question, 30.4% were households made up of just one person and there were 5 adults who lived with their parents. Of the rest of the households, there are 186 married couples without children, 213 married couples with children There were 61 single parents with a child or children. There were 9 households that were made up of unrelated people and 23 households that were made up of some sort of institution or another collective housing.

In 2000 there were 153 single family homes (or 52.6% of the total) out of a total of 291 inhabited buildings. There were 77 multi-family buildings (26.5%), along with 43 multi-purpose buildings that were mostly used for housing (14.8%) and 18 other use buildings (commercial or industrial) that also had some housing (6.2%). Of the single family homes 50 were built before 1919, while 11 were built between 1990 and 2000.

In 2000 there were 718 apartments in the municipality. The most common apartment size was 3 rooms of which there were 214. There were 21 single room apartments and 218 apartments with five or more rooms. Of these apartments, a total of 656 apartments (91.4% of the total) were permanently occupied, while 55 apartments (7.7%) were seasonally occupied and 7 apartments (1.0%) were empty. As of 2009, the construction rate of new housing units was 0 new units per 1000 residents. The vacancy rate for the municipality, in 2010, was 0.25%.

The historical population is given in the following chart:

== Heritage sites of national significance ==
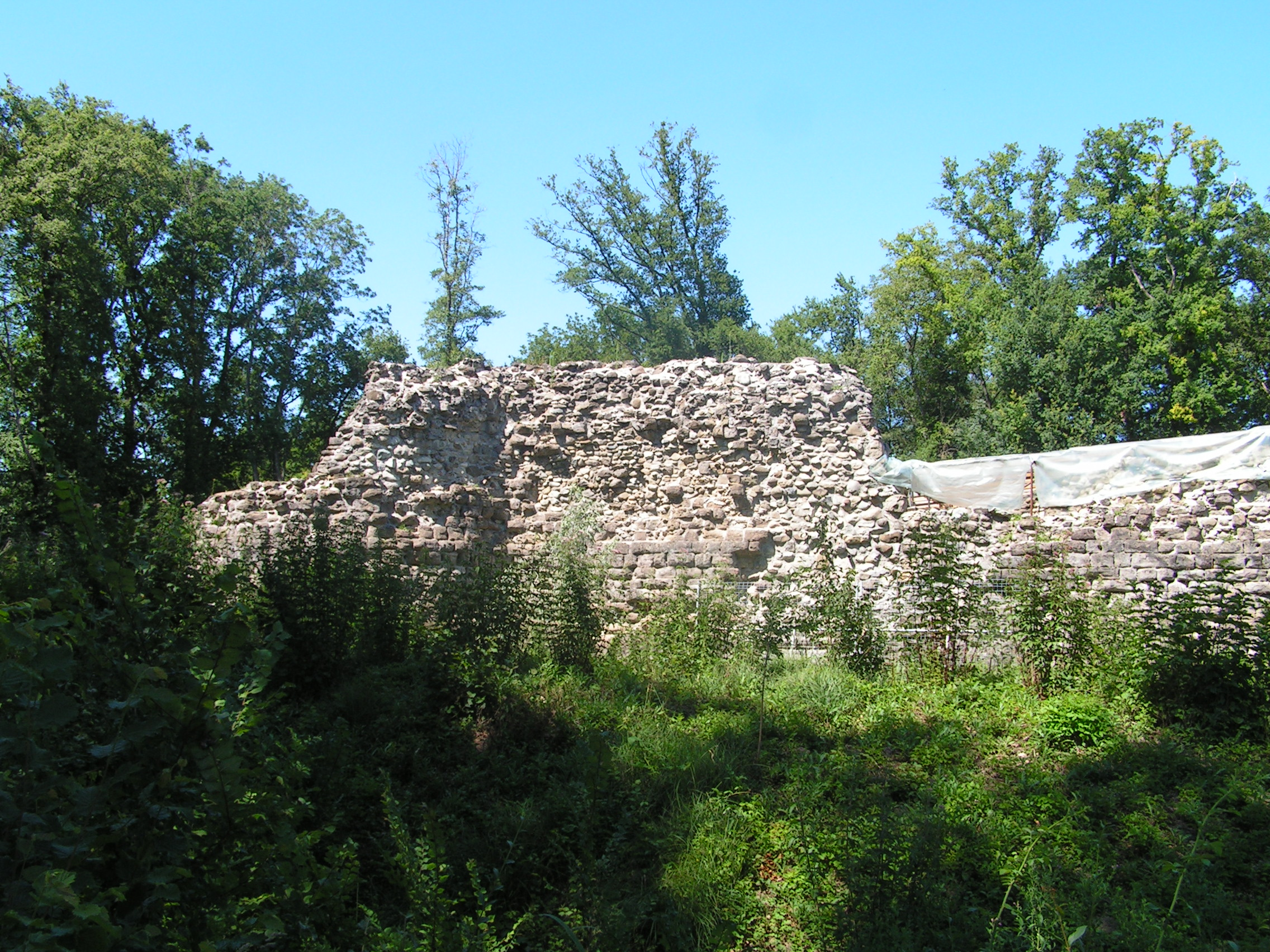
Ruins of Rouelbeau Castle

The Ruins of Rouelbeau Castle is listed as a Swiss heritage site of national significance. The entire hamlet of Carre is listed in the Inventory of Swiss Heritage Sites.

== Politics ==
In the 2007 federal election the most popular party was the SVP which received 21.76% of the vote. The next three most popular parties were the LPS Party (17.58%), the SP (16.63%) and the Green Party (13.71%). In the federal election, a total of 578 votes were cast, and the voter turnout was 50.4%.

In the 2009 Grand Conseil election, there were a total of 1,158 registered voters of which 499 (43.1%) voted. The most popular party in the municipality for this election was the Libéral with 18.8% of the ballots. In the canton-wide election they received the highest proportion of votes. The second most popular party was the PDC (with 13.5%), they were fifth in the canton-wide election, while the third most popular party was the Les Verts (with 12.9%), they were second in the canton-wide election.

For the 2009 Conseil d'Etat election, there were a total of 1,159 registered voters of which 629 (54.3%) voted.

In 2011, all the municipalities held local elections, and in Meinier there were 15 spots open on the municipal council. There were a total of 1,365 registered voters of which 651 (47.7%) voted. Out of the 651 votes, there were 8 blank votes, 7 null or unreadable votes and 92 votes with a name that was not on the list.

In 2025, all municipalities in the canton of Geneva transitioned to a three-mayor (“administrative councillors”) system. Marc Jaquet, Simona Korff and Enrico Castelli were elected, together with 17 members of the Municipal Council.

== Economy ==
As of 2010, Meinier had an unemployment rate of 3.5%. As of 2008, there were 76 people employed in the primary economic sector and about 19 businesses involved in this sector. 268 people were employed in the secondary sector and there were 39 businesses in this sector. 317 people were employed in the tertiary sector, with 48 businesses in this sector. There were 851 residents of the municipality who were employed in some capacity, of which females made up 43.6% of the workforce.

In 2008 the total number of full-time equivalent jobs was 598. The number of jobs in the primary sector was 64, all of which were in agriculture. The number of jobs in the secondary sector was 257 of which 127 or (49.4%) were in manufacturing and 130 (50.6%) were in construction. The number of jobs in the tertiary sector was 277. In the tertiary sector; 54 or 19.5% were in wholesale or retail sales or the repair of motor vehicles, 55 or 19.9% were in the movement and storage of goods, 33 or 11.9% were in a hotel or restaurant, 1 was in the information industry, 1 was the insurance or financial industry, 4 or 1.4% were technical professionals or scientists, 18 or 6.5% were in education and 72 or 26.0% were in health care.

In 2000, there were 180 workers who commuted into the municipality and 679 workers who commuted away. The municipality is a net exporter of workers, with about 3.8 workers leaving the municipality for every one entering. About 21.1% of the workforce coming into Meinier are coming from outside Switzerland. Of the working population, 12% used public transportation to get to work, and 65.5% used a private car.

== Religion ==
From the 2000 census, 759 or 44.8% were Roman Catholic, while 352 or 20.8% belonged to the Swiss Reformed Church. Of the rest of the population, there were 18 members of an Orthodox church (or about 1.06% of the population), there was 1 individual who belongs to the Christian Catholic Church, and there were 41 individuals (or about 2.42% of the population) who belonged to another Christian church. There were 8 individuals (or about 0.47% of the population) who were Jewish, and 20 (or about 1.18% of the population) who were Islamic. There was 1 person who was Buddhist and 2 individuals who belonged to another church. 354 (or about 20.87% of the population) belonged to no church, are agnostic or atheist, and 140 individuals (or about 8.25% of the population) did not answer the question.

== Education ==
In Meinier about 558 or (32.9%) of the population have completed non-mandatory upper secondary education, and 371 or (21.9%) have completed additional higher education (either university or a Fachhochschule). Of the 371 who completed tertiary schooling, 41.2% were Swiss men, 35.3% were Swiss women, 14.0% were non-Swiss men and 9.4% were non-Swiss women.

During the 2009-2010 school year there were a total of 369 students in the Meinier school system. The education system in the Canton of Geneva allows young children to attend two years of non-obligatory Kindergarten. During that school year, there were 34 children who were in a pre-kindergarten class. The canton's school system provides two years of non-mandatory kindergarten and requires students to attend six years of primary school, with some of the children attending smaller, specialized classes. In Meinier there were 45 students in kindergarten or primary school and 6 students were in the special, smaller classes. The secondary school program consists of three lower, obligatory years of schooling, followed by three to five years of optional, advanced schools. There were 45 lower secondary students who attended school in Meinier. There were 74 upper secondary students from the municipality along with 12 students who were in a professional, non-university track program. An additional 55 students attended a private school.

As of 2000, there were 21 students in Meinier who came from another municipality, while 196 residents attended schools outside the municipality.
