= Choulex =

- Municipality
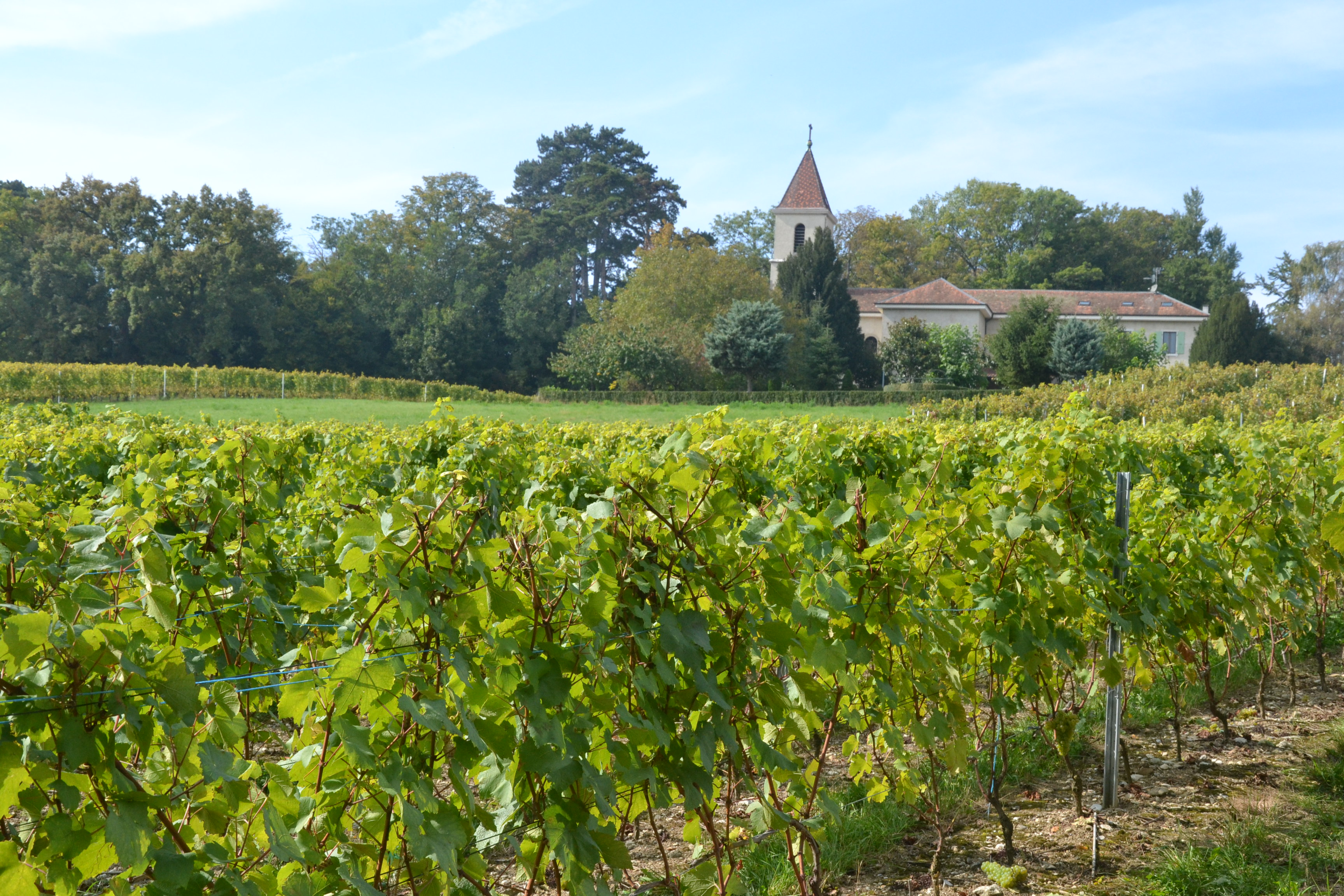
- Vineyards in Choulex with Saint-André Church in the background

- Flag Coat of arms
- Location of Choulex
- Location within Switzerland Location within Canton of Geneva
- Coordinates: 46°13′N 06°13′E
- Country: Switzerland
- Canton: Geneva
- District: n.a.

Government
  - Mayor: Maire; Christophe Senglet

Area
  - Total: 3.91 km^{2} (1.51 sq mi)
- Elevation: 470 m (1,540 ft)

Population (December 2020)
  - Total: 1,182
  - Density: 302/km^{2} (783/sq mi)
- Time zone: UTC+01:00 (CET)
  - Summer (DST): UTC+02:00 (CEST)
- Postal code: 1244
- SFOS number: 6614
- ISO 3166 code: CH-GE
- Surrounded by: Collonge-Bellerive, Cologny, Meinier, Presinge, Puplinge, Thônex, Vandœuvres
- Website: www.choulex.ch

Choulex is a municipality of the Canton of Geneva, Switzerland. Choulex is first mentioned in 1153 as Cholay.

== Geography ==
Choulex has an area, as of 2009, of 3.91 square kilometers (1.51 sq mi). Of this area, 2.88 km^{2} (1.11 sq mi) or 73.7% is used for agricultural purposes, while 0.37 km^{2} (0.14 sq mi) or 9.5% is forested. Of the rest of the land, 0.59 km^{2} (0.23 sq mi) or 15.1% is settled (buildings or roads), 0.02 km^{2} (4.9 acres) or 0.5% is either rivers or lakes and 0.04 km^{2} (9.9 acres) or 1.0% is unproductive land.

Of the built up area, housing and buildings made up 11.8% and transportation infrastructure made up 2.3%. Out of the forested land, 5.4% of the total land area is heavily forested and 4.1% is covered with orchards or small clusters of trees. Of the agricultural land, 52.4% is used for growing crops and 12.5% is pastures, while 8.7% is used for orchards or vine crops. All the water in the municipality is flowing water.

The municipality is located south of Lake Geneva. It consists of the linear village of Choulex and the hamlets of Bonvard, Briffod, Chevrier, La Capite and Miolan.

The municipality of Choulex consists of the sub-sections or villages of La Capite - Bonvard, Sur-la-Ville, Les Jurets and Choulex.

== Demographics ==
Choulex has a population (as of December 2020) of 1,182. As of 2008, 16.4% of the population are resident foreign nationals. Over the last ten years (1999–2009) the population has changed at a rate of -0.3%. It has changed at a rate of 1.9% due to migration and at a rate of -2.1% due to births and deaths.

Most of the population (as of 2000) speaks French (812 or 86.8%), with English being second most common (54 or 5.8%) and German being third (23 or 2.5%).

As of 2008, the gender distribution of the population was 46.7% male and 53.3% female. The population was made up of 369 Swiss men (35.7% of the population) and 113 (10.9%) non-Swiss men. There were 430 Swiss women (41.6%) and 121 (11.7%) non-Swiss women. Of the population in the municipality 212 or about 22.7% were born in Choulex and lived there in 2000. There were 310 or 33.2% who were born in the same canton, while 123 or 13.2% were born somewhere else in Switzerland, and 237 or 25.3% were born outside of Switzerland.

In 2008 there were four live births to Swiss citizens and five births to non-Swiss citizens, and in same time span there were ten deaths of Swiss citizens and two non-Swiss citizen deaths. Ignoring immigration and emigration, the population of Swiss citizens decreased by six while the foreign population increased by three. There was one Swiss man who emigrated from Switzerland and three Swiss women who immigrated back to Switzerland. At the same time, there were three non-Swiss men and two non-Swiss women who emigrated from Switzerland to another country. The total Swiss population change in 2008 (from all sources, including moves across municipal borders) was a decrease of seven and the non-Swiss population decreased by 19 people. This represents a population growth rate of −2.7%.

The age distribution of the population (as of 2000) is children and teenagers (0–19 years old) make up 25.3% of the population, while adults (20–64 years old) make up 56.3% and seniors (over 64 years old) make up 18.4%.

As of 2000, there were 371 people who were single and never married in the municipality. There were 446 married individuals, 60 widows or widowers and 58 individuals who are divorced.

As of 2000, there were 357 private households in the municipality, and an average of 2.5 persons per household. There were 108 households that consist of only one person and 33 households with five or more people. Out of a total of 377 households that answered this question, 28.6 percent were households made up of just one person and there were four adults who lived with their parents. Of the rest of the households, there are 91 married couples without children, 123 married couples with children. There were 26 single parents with a child or children. There were five households that were made up of unrelated people and 20 households that were made up of some sort of institution or another collective housing.

In 2000 there were 165 single family homes (or 68.8% of the total) out of a total of 240 inhabited buildings. There were 50 multi-family buildings (20.8%), along with 18 multi-purpose buildings that were mostly used for housing (7.5%) and seven other use buildings (commercial or industrial) that also had some housing (2.9%). Of the single family homes 61 were built before 1919, while 19 were built between 1990 and 2000.

In 2000 there were 408 apartments in the municipality. The most common apartment size was three rooms of which there were 104. There were 28 single room apartments and 159 apartments with five or more rooms. Of these apartments, a total of 336 apartments (82.4% of the total) were permanently occupied, while 64 apartments (15.7%) were seasonally occupied and eight apartments (2.0%) were empty. As of 2009, the construction rate of new housing units was nil new units per 1000 residents. The vacancy rate for the municipality, in 2010, was 0.23%.

The historical population is given in the following chart:

== Politics ==
In the 2007 federal election the most popular party was the SVP which received 22.49% of the vote. The next three most popular parties were the LPS Party (22.4%), the Green Party (17.94%) and the SP (12.78%). In the federal election, a total of 328 votes were cast, and the voter turnout was 53.0%.

In the 2009 Grand Conseil election, there were a total of 635 registered voters of which 312 (49.1%) voted. The most popular party in the municipality for this election was the Libéral with 24.9% of the ballots. In the canton-wide election they received the highest proportion of votes. The second most popular party was the Les Verts (with 17.7%), they were also second in the canton-wide election, while the third most popular party was the PDC (with 11.1%), they were fifth in the canton-wide election.

For the 2009 Conseil d'État election, there were a total of 638 registered voters of which 336 (52.7%) voted.

In 2011, all the municipalities held local elections, and in Choulex there were 13 spots open on the municipal council. There were a total of 692 registered voters of which 345 (49.9%) voted. Out of the 345 votes, there was one blank vote, one null or unreadable votes and 52 votes with a name that was not on the list.

== Economy ==
As of 2010, Choulex had an unemployment rate of 4.2%. As of 2008, there were 29 people employed in the primary economic sector and about ten businesses involved in this sector. Twenty-five people were employed in the secondary economic sector and there were eight businesses in this sector. Sixty-five people were employed in the tertiary sector of the economy, with 20 businesses in this sector. There were 420 residents of the municipality who were employed in some capacity, of which females made up 43.1% of the workforce.

In 2008 the total number of full-time equivalent jobs was 96. The number of jobs in the primary sector was 18, all of which were in agriculture. The number of jobs in the secondary sector was 23, all of which were in construction. The number of jobs in the tertiary sector was 55. In the tertiary sector; four or 7.3% were in wholesale or retail sales or the repair of motor vehicles, five or 9.1% were in a hotel or restaurant, four or 7.3% were technical professionals or scientists, five or 9.1% were in education and 25 or 45.5% were in health care.

In 2000, there were 124 workers who commuted into the municipality and 350 workers who commuted away. The municipality is a net exporter of workers, with about 2.8 workers leaving the municipality for every one entering. About 33.9% of the workforce coming into Choulex are coming from outside Switzerland, while 0.0% of the locals commute out of Switzerland for work. Of the working population, 16% used public transportation to get to work, and 62.9% used a private car.

== Religion ==
From the 2000 census, 382 or 40.9% were Roman Catholic, while 221 or 23.6% belonged to the Swiss Reformed Church. Of the rest of the population, there were eight members of an Eastern Orthodox Church (or about 0.86% of the population), there was one individual who belongs to the Christian Catholic Church of Switzerland, and there were 22 individuals (or about 2.35% of the population) who belonged to another Christian church. There were 24 individuals (or about 2.57% of the population) who were Jewish, and 17 (or about 1.82% of the population) who were Islamic. There was one person who was Buddhist and one who belonged to another church. About 19.14 percent of the population (or 179 individuals) belong to no church, are agnostic or atheist, and 79 individuals (or about 8.45% of the population) did not answer the question.

== Education ==
In Choulex about 281 or (30.1%) of the population have completed non-mandatory upper secondary education, and 252 or (27.0%) have completed additional higher education (either university or a Fachhochschule). Of the 252 who completed tertiary schooling, 42.1% were Swiss men, 34.1% were Swiss women, 13.5% were non-Swiss men and 10.3% were non-Swiss women.

During the 2009–2010 school year there were a total of 212 students in the Choulex school system. The education system in the Canton of Geneva allows young children to attend two years of non-obligatory kindergarten. During that school year, there were 13 children who were in a pre-kindergarten class. The canton's school system provides two years of non-mandatory kindergarten and requires students to attend six years of primary school, with some of the children attending smaller, specialized classes. In Choulex there were 28 students in kindergarten or primary school and - students were in the special, smaller classes. The secondary school program consists of three lower, obligatory years of schooling, followed by three to five years of optional, advanced schools. There were 28 lower secondary students who attended school in Choulex. There were 39 upper secondary students from the municipality along with 12 students who were in a professional, non-university track program. An additional 39 students attended a private school.

As of 2000, there were five students in Choulex who came from another municipality, while 131 residents attended schools outside the municipality.
