= Corsier =

- Municipality
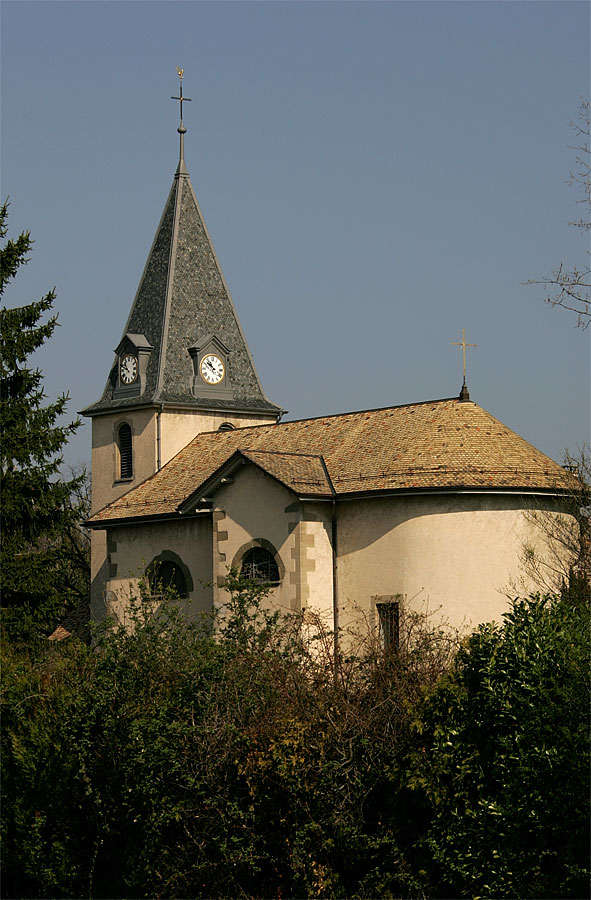

- Flag Coat of arms
- Location of Corsier
- Location within Switzerland Location within Canton of Geneva
- Coordinates: 46°15′N 06°13′E
- Country: Switzerland
- Canton: Geneva
- District: n.a.

Government
  - Mayor: Maire; Gilbert Henchoz

Area
  - Total: 2.74 km^{2} (1.06 sq mi)
- Elevation: 430 m (1,410 ft)

Population (December 2020)
  - Total: 2,295
  - Density: 838/km^{2} (2,170/sq mi)
- Time zone: UTC+01:00 (CET)
  - Summer (DST): UTC+02:00 (CEST)
- Postal code: 1246
- SFOS number: 6619
- ISO 3166 code: CH-GE
- Surrounded by: Anières, Collonge-Bellerive, Gy, Meinier, Veigy-Foncenex (FR-74)
- Website: www.corsier.ch

Corsier (French pronunciation: [kɔʁsje], locally [kɔʁzje]) is a municipality of the Canton of Geneva, Switzerland.

== History ==
Corsier is first mentioned in 1297 as Corsiacum. Between 1816 and 1858 Corsier and Anières formed a single municipality.

== Geography ==
Corsier has an area, as of 2012, of 2.74 square kilometers (1.06 sq mi). Of this area, 1.58 km^{2} (0.61 sq mi) or 57.7% is used for agricultural purposes, while 0.08 km^{2} (0.031 sq mi) or 2.9% is forested. Of the rest of the land, 1.1 km^{2} (0.42 sq mi) or 40.1% is settled (buildings or roads), 0.03 km^{2} (7.4 acres) or 1.1% is either rivers or lakes and 0.01 km^{2} (2.5 acres) or 0.4% is unproductive land.

Of the built up area, housing and buildings made up 27.4% and transportation infrastructure made up 4.0%. while parks, green belts and sports fields made up 1.8%. Out of the forested land, 2.2% of the total land area is heavily forested and 0.7% is covered with orchards or small clusters of trees. Of the agricultural land, 39.4% is used for growing crops and 9.1% is pastures, while 9.1% is used for orchards or vine crops. All the water in the municipality is flowing water.

The municipality is located on the left bank of Lake Geneva.

== Demographics ==
Corsier has a population (as of December 2020) of 2,295. As of 2008, 29.1% of the population are resident foreign nationals. Over the last 10 years (1999–2009) the population has changed at a rate of 5.2%. It has changed at a rate of -0.8% due to migration and at a rate of 5.5% due to births and deaths.

Most of the population (as of 2000) speaks French (1,361 or 80.9%), with English being second most common (106 or 6.3%) and German being third (74 or 4.4%).

As of 2008, the gender distribution of the population was 50.0% male and 50.0% female. The population was made up of 636 Swiss men (35.1% of the population) and 271 (14.9%) non-Swiss men. There were 670 Swiss women (36.9%) and 237 (13.1%) non-Swiss women. Of the population in the municipality 304 or about 18.1% were born in Corsier and lived there in 2000. There were 522 or 31.0% who were born in the same canton, while 253 or 15.0% were born somewhere else in Switzerland, and 558 or 33.2% were born outside of Switzerland.

In 2008 there were 11 live births to Swiss citizens and 7 births to non-Swiss citizens, and in same time span there were 5 deaths of Swiss citizens and 1 non-Swiss citizen death. Ignoring immigration and emigration, the population of Swiss citizens increased by 6 while the foreign population increased by 6. There were 4 Swiss men and 4 Swiss women who emigrated from Switzerland. At the same time, there were 12 non-Swiss men and 11 non-Swiss women who immigrated from another country to Switzerland. The total Swiss population change in 2008 (from all sources, including moves across municipal borders) was an increase of 10 and the non-Swiss population increased by 17 people. This represents a population growth rate of 1.5%.

The age distribution of the population (as of 2000) is children and teenagers (0–19 years old) make up 27.8% of the population, while adults (20–64 years old) make up 61.2% and seniors (over 64 years old) make up 11.1%.

As of 2000, there were 684 people who were single and never married in the municipality. There were 844 married individuals, 60 widows or widowers and 94 individuals who are divorced.

As of 2000, there were 615 private households in the municipality, and an average of 2.6 persons per household. There were 152 households that consist of only one person and 54 households with five or more people. Out of a total of 633 households that answered this question, 24.0% were households made up of just one person and there were 2 adults who lived with their parents. Of the rest of the households, there are 159 married couples without children, 250 married couples with children There were 45 single parents with a child or children. There were 7 households that were made up of unrelated people and 18 households that were made up of some sort of institution or another collective housing.

In 2000 there were 307 single family homes (or 75.6% of the total) out of a total of 406 inhabited buildings. There were 41 multi-family buildings (10.1%), along with 36 multi-purpose buildings that were mostly used for housing (8.9%) and 22 other use buildings (commercial or industrial) that also had some housing (5.4%). Of the single family homes 49 were built before 1919, while 44 were built between 1990 and 2000. The greatest number of single family homes (79) were built between 1981 and 1990.

In 2000 there were 677 apartments in the municipality. The most common apartment size was 4 rooms of which there were 158. There were 39 single room apartments and 316 apartments with five or more rooms. Of these apartments, a total of 592 apartments (87.4% of the total) were permanently occupied, while 72 apartments (10.6%) were seasonally occupied and 13 apartments (1.9%) were empty. As of 2009, the construction rate of new housing units was 3.9 new units per 1000 residents. The vacancy rate for the municipality, in 2010, was 1.4%.

The historical population is given in the following chart:

== Heritage sites of national significance ==
The prehistoric lakeside settlement at Port is listed as a Swiss heritage site of national significance. The settlement is part of the Prehistoric Pile dwellings around the Alps a UNESCO World Heritage Site.

== Politics ==
In the 2007 federal election the most popular party was the LPS Party which received 26.79% of the vote. The next three most popular parties were the SVP (21.79%), the CVP (15.08%) and the Green Party (10.91%). In the federal election, a total of 486 votes were cast, and the voter turnout was 50.5%.

== Economy ==
As of 2010, Corsier had an unemployment rate of 4.5%. As of 2008, there were 53 people employed in the primary economic sector and about 7 businesses involved in this sector. 38 people were employed in the secondary sector and there were 12 businesses in this sector. 183 people were employed in the tertiary sector, with 54 businesses in this sector. There were 813 residents of the municipality who were employed in some capacity, of which females made up 42.2% of the workforce.

In 2008 the total number of full-time equivalent jobs was 237. The number of jobs in the primary sector was 48, all of which were in agriculture. The number of jobs in the secondary sector was 36 of which 4 or (11.1%) were in manufacturing and 28 (77.8%) were in construction. The number of jobs in the tertiary sector was 153. In the tertiary sector; 26 or 17.0% were in wholesale or retail sales or the repair of motor vehicles, 15 or 9.8% were in the movement and storage of goods, 19 or 12.4% were in a hotel or restaurant, 1 was in the information industry, 5 or 3.3% were the insurance or financial industry, 13 or 8.5% were technical professionals or scientists, 35 or 22.9% were in education and 10 or 6.5% were in health care.

In 2000, there were 150 workers who commuted into the municipality and 697 workers who commuted away. The municipality is a net exporter of workers, with about 4.6 workers leaving the municipality for every one entering. About 18.0% of the workforce coming into Corsier are coming from outside Switzerland, while 0.3% of the locals commute out of Switzerland for work. Of the working population, 17.8% used public transportation to get to work, and 68.4% used a private car.

== Religion ==
From the 2000 census, 709 or 42.2% were Roman Catholic, while 378 or 22.5% belonged to the Swiss Reformed Church. Of the rest of the population, there were 28 members of an Orthodox church (or about 1.66% of the population), and there were 22 individuals (or about 1.31% of the population) who belonged to another Christian church. There were 21 individuals (or about 1.25% of the population) who were Jewish, and 38 (or about 2.26% of the population) who were Islamic. There were 13 individuals who were Buddhist, 2 individuals who were Hindu and 3 individuals who belonged to another church. 330 (or about 19.62% of the population) belonged to no church, are agnostic or atheist, and 138 individuals (or about 8.20% of the population) did not answer the question.

== Education ==
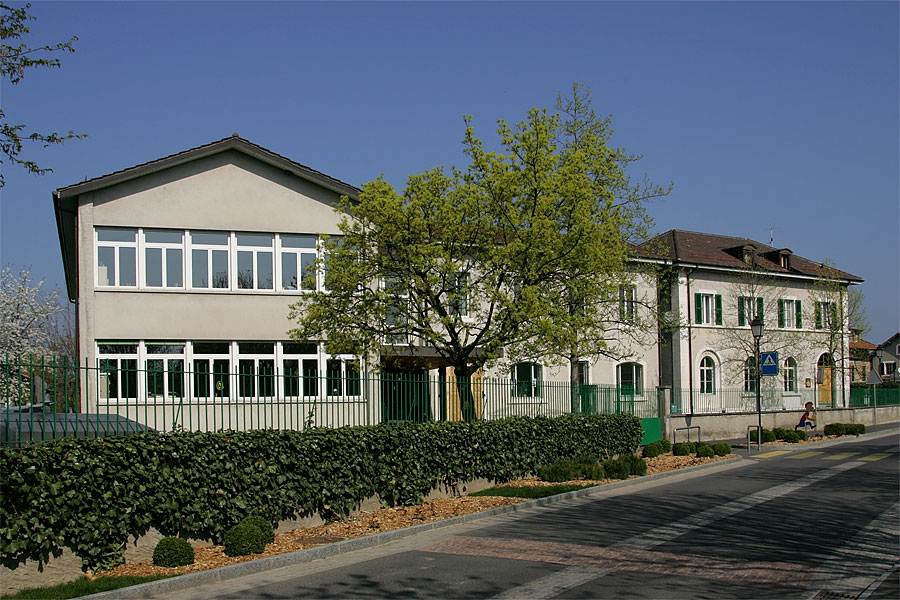
Primary School in Corsier

In Corsier about 480 or (28.5%) of the population have completed non-mandatory upper secondary education, and 465 or (27.6%) have completed additional higher education (either university or a Fachhochschule). Of the 465 who completed tertiary schooling, 38.9% were Swiss men, 32.9% were Swiss women, 16.3% were non-Swiss men and 11.8% were non-Swiss women.

During the 2009–2010 school year there were a total of 390 students in the Corsier school system. The education system in the Canton of Geneva allows young children to attend two years of non-obligatory Kindergarten. During that school year, there were 23 children who were in a pre-kindergarten class. The canton's school system provides two years of non-mandatory kindergarten and requires students to attend six years of primary school, with some of the children attending smaller, specialized classes. In Corsier there were 42 students in kindergarten or primary school and 5 students were in the special, smaller classes. The secondary school program consists of three lower, obligatory years of schooling, followed by three to five years of optional, advanced schools. There were 42 lower secondary students who attended school in Corsier. There were 88 upper secondary students from the municipality along with 8 students who were in a professional, non-university track program. An additional 101 students attended a private school.

As of 2000, there were 149 students in Corsier who came from another municipality, while 213 residents attended schools outside the municipality.
