= Gy, Switzerland =

Place in Geneva, Switzerland

Gy
- Municipality
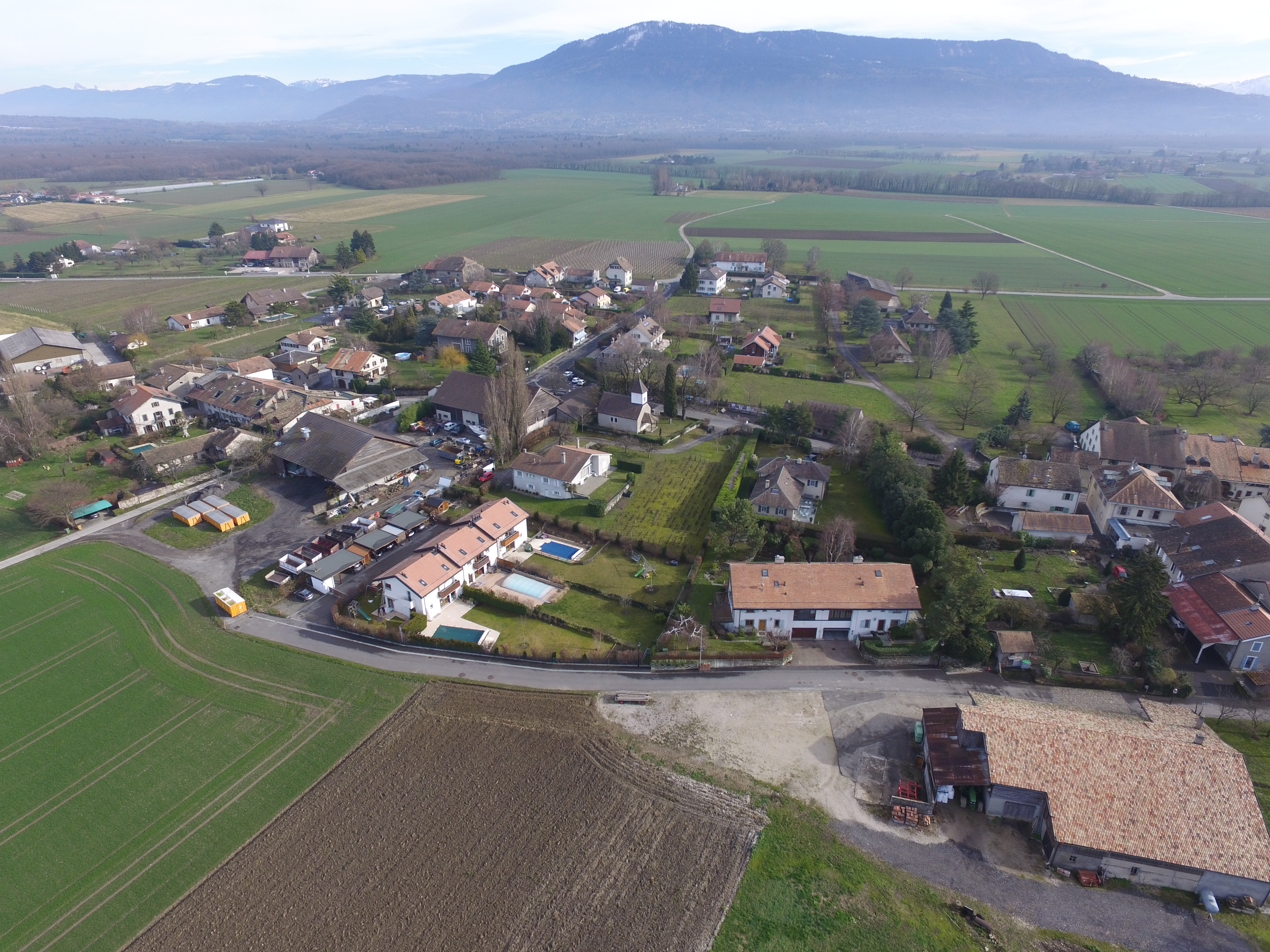

- Flag Coat of arms
- Location of Gy
- Location within Switzerland Location within Canton of Geneva
- Coordinates: 46°15′N 6°15′E
- Country: Switzerland
- Canton: Geneva
- District: n.a.

Government
  - Mayor: Maire

Area
  - Total: 3.28 km^{2} (1.27 sq mi)
- Elevation: 405 m (1,329 ft)

Population (December 2020)
  - Total: 473
  - Density: 144/km^{2} (373/sq mi)
- Time zone: UTC+01:00 (CET)
  - Summer (DST): UTC+02:00 (CEST)
- Postal code: 1251
- SFOS number: 6624
- ISO 3166 code: CH-GE
- Surrounded by: Corsier, Jussy, Machilly (FR-74), Meinier, Veigy-Foncenex (FR-74)
- Website: www.mairie-gy.ch

Gy (French pronunciation: [ʒi]) is a municipality in the Canton of Geneva, Switzerland.

== History ==
Gy is first mentioned in 1227 as Gyez. In 1289 it was mentioned as Giez. In 1851 the municipality separated from Jussy to form an independent municipality.

== Geography ==
Gy has an area, as of 2009, of 3.28 square kilometers (1.27 sq mi). Of this area, 1.9 km^{2} (0.73 sq mi) or 57.9% is used for agricultural purposes, while 0.99 km^{2} (0.38 sq mi) or 30.2% is forested. Of the rest of the land, 0.26 km^{2} (0.10 sq mi) or 7.9% is settled (buildings or roads) and 0.06 km^{2} (15 acres) or 1.8% is unproductive land.

Of the built up area, housing and buildings made up 6.1% and transportation infrastructure made up 1.5%. Out of the forested land, all of the forested land area is covered with heavy forests. Of the agricultural land, 50.9% is used for growing crops and 4.6% is pastures, while 2.4% is used for orchards or vine crops.

The municipality is located on the left bank of Lake Geneva and on the right bank of the Seymaz. It is on the Swiss-French border.

The municipality of Gy consists of the sub-sections or villages of Beaupré, Gy - village, Les Longeraies and Les Etoiles.

== Demographics ==
Largest groups of foreign residents 2013
Nationality	Amount	% total (population)
France	38	7.6
Portugal	10	2.0
UK	9	1.8
Belgium	7	1.4
Italy	7	1.4

Gy has a population (as of December 2020) of 473. As of 2008, 22.1% of the population are resident foreign nationals. Over the last 10 years (1999–2009 ) the population has changed at a rate of 10.2%. It has changed at a rate of 5.8% due to migration and at a rate of 4.2% due to births and deaths.

Most of the population (as of 2000) speaks French (336 or 90.8%), with German being second most common (12 or 3.2%) and English being third (11 or 3.0%). There are 4 people who speak Italian.

As of 2008, the gender distribution of the population was 47.3% male and 52.7% female. The population was made up of 173 Swiss men (38.6% of the population) and 39 (8.7%) non-Swiss men. There were 191 Swiss women (42.6%) and 45 (10.0%) non-Swiss women. Of the population in the municipality 92 or about 24.9% were born in Gy and lived there in 2000. There were 129 or 34.9% who were born in the same canton, while 48 or 13.0% were born somewhere else in Switzerland, and 87 or 23.5% were born outside of Switzerland.

In 2008 there were 5 live births to Swiss citizens and 2 births to non-Swiss citizens, and in same time span there were 2 deaths of Swiss citizens. Ignoring immigration and emigration, the population of Swiss citizens increased by 3 while the foreign population increased by 2. There were 2 Swiss men and 3 Swiss women who emigrated from Switzerland. At the same time, there were 5 non-Swiss men and 2 non-Swiss women who immigrated from another country to Switzerland. The total Swiss population change in 2008 (from all sources, including moves across municipal borders) was an increase of 4 and the non-Swiss population increased by 10 people. This represents a population growth rate of 3.4%.

The age distribution of the population (as of 2000) is children and teenagers (0–19 years old) make up 35.9% of the population, while adults (20–64 years old) make up 53.5% and seniors (over 64 years old) make up 10.5%.

As of 2000, there were 175 people who were single and never married in the municipality. There were 169 married individuals, 10 widows or widowers and 16 individuals who are divorced.

As of 2000, there were 121 private households in the municipality, and an average of 3. persons per household. There were 27 households that consist of only one person and 20 households with five or more people. Out of a total of 126 households that answered this question, 21.4% were households made up of just one person. Of the rest of the households, there are 21 married couples without children, 67 married couples with children There were 6 single parents with a child or children.

In 2000 there were 75 single family homes (or 75.0% of the total) out of a total of 100 inhabited buildings. There were 5 multi-family buildings (5.0%), along with 18 multi-purpose buildings that were mostly used for housing (18.0%) and 2 other use buildings (commercial or industrial) that also had some housing (2.0%). Of the single family homes 16 were built before 1919, while 23 were built between 1990 and 2000.

In 2000 there were 118 apartments in the municipality. The most common apartment size was 4 rooms of which there were 28. There were 7 single room apartments and 65 apartments with five or more rooms. Of these apartments, a total of 110 apartments (93.2% of the total) were permanently occupied, while 6 apartments (5.1%) were seasonally occupied and 2 apartments (1.7%) were empty. As of 2009, the construction rate of new housing units was 0 new units per 1000 residents. The vacancy rate for the municipality, in 2010, was 0%.

The historical population is given in the following chart:

== Politics ==
In the 2007 federal election the most popular party was the LPS Party which received 22.58% of the vote. The next three most popular parties were the Green Party (18.85%), the SVP (16.2%) and the SP (13.69%). In the federal election, a total of 137 votes were cast, and the voter turnout was 58.5%.

In the 2009 Grand Conseil election, there were a total of 253 registered voters of which 114 (45.1%) voted. The most popular party in the municipality for this election was the Libéral with 23.7% of the ballots. In the canton-wide election they received the highest proportion of votes. The second most popular party was the Les Verts (with 14.0%), they were also second in the canton-wide election, while the third most popular party was the MCG (with 10.5%), they were also third in the canton-wide election.

For the 2009 Conseil d'Etat election, there were a total of 254 registered voters of which 141 (55.5%) voted.

In 2011, all the municipalities held local elections, and in Gy there were 9 spots open on the municipal council. There were a total of 317 registered voters of which 188 (59.3%) voted. Out of the 188 votes, there were 2 blank votes, 3 null or unreadable votes and 6 votes with a name that was not on the list.

== Economy ==
As of 2010, Gy had an unemployment rate of 3.1%. As of 2008, there were 45 people employed in the primary economic sector and about 12 businesses involved in this sector. 17 people were employed in the secondary sector and there were 5 businesses in this sector. 32 people were employed in the tertiary sector, with 9 businesses in this sector. There were 168 residents of the municipality who were employed in some capacity, of which females made up 42.3% of the workforce.

In 2008 the total number of full-time equivalent jobs was 69. The number of jobs in the primary sector was 30, all of which were in agriculture. The number of jobs in the secondary sector was 16 of which 4 or (25.0%) were in manufacturing and 13 (81.3%) were in construction. The number of jobs in the tertiary sector was 23. In the tertiary sector; 3 or 13.0% were in wholesale or retail sales or the repair of motor vehicles, 2 or 8.7% were in a hotel or restaurant, 2 or 8.7% were technical professionals or scientists, 2 or 8.7% were in education.

In 2000, there were 51 workers who commuted into the municipality and 127 workers who commuted away. The municipality is a net exporter of workers, with about 2.5 workers leaving the municipality for every one entering. About 15.7% of the workforce coming into Gy are coming from outside Switzerland, while 0.0% of the locals commute out of Switzerland for work. Of the working population, 7.1% used public transportation to get to work, and 66.7% used a private car.

== Religion ==
From the 2000 census, 118 or 31.9% were Roman Catholic, while 98 or 26.5% belonged to the Swiss Reformed Church. Of the rest of the population, there were 3 members of an Orthodox church (or about 0.81% of the population), and there were 11 individuals (or about 2.97% of the population) who belonged to another Christian church. There were 7 individuals (or about 1.89% of the population) who were Jewish, and 2 (or about 0.54% of the population) who were Islamic. There were and 1 individual who belonged to another church. 107 (or about 28.92% of the population) belonged to no church, are agnostic or atheist, and 23 individuals (or about 6.22% of the population) did not answer the question.

== Education ==
In Gy about 113 or (30.5%) of the population have completed non-mandatory upper secondary education, and 74 or (20.0%) have completed additional higher education (either university or a Fachhochschule). Of the 74 who completed tertiary schooling, 47.3% were Swiss men, 31.1% were Swiss women, 14.9% were non-Swiss men and 6.8% were non-Swiss women.

During the 2009-2010 school year there were a total of 105 students in the Gy school system. The education system in the Canton of Geneva allows young children to attend two years of non-obligatory Kindergarten. During that school year, there were 7 children who were in a pre-kindergarten class. The canton's school system provides two years of non-mandatory kindergarten and requires students to attend six years of primary school, with some of the children attending smaller, specialized classes. In Gy there were 8 students in kindergarten or primary school and - students were in the special, smaller classes. The secondary school program consists of three lower, obligatory years of schooling, followed by three to five years of optional, advanced schools. There were 8 lower secondary students who attended school in Gy. There were 27 upper secondary students from the municipality along with 2 students who were in a professional, non-university track program. An additional 21 students attended a private school.

As of 2000, there were 7 students in Gy who came from another municipality, while 57 residents attended schools outside the municipality.
