= Presinge =

- Municipality
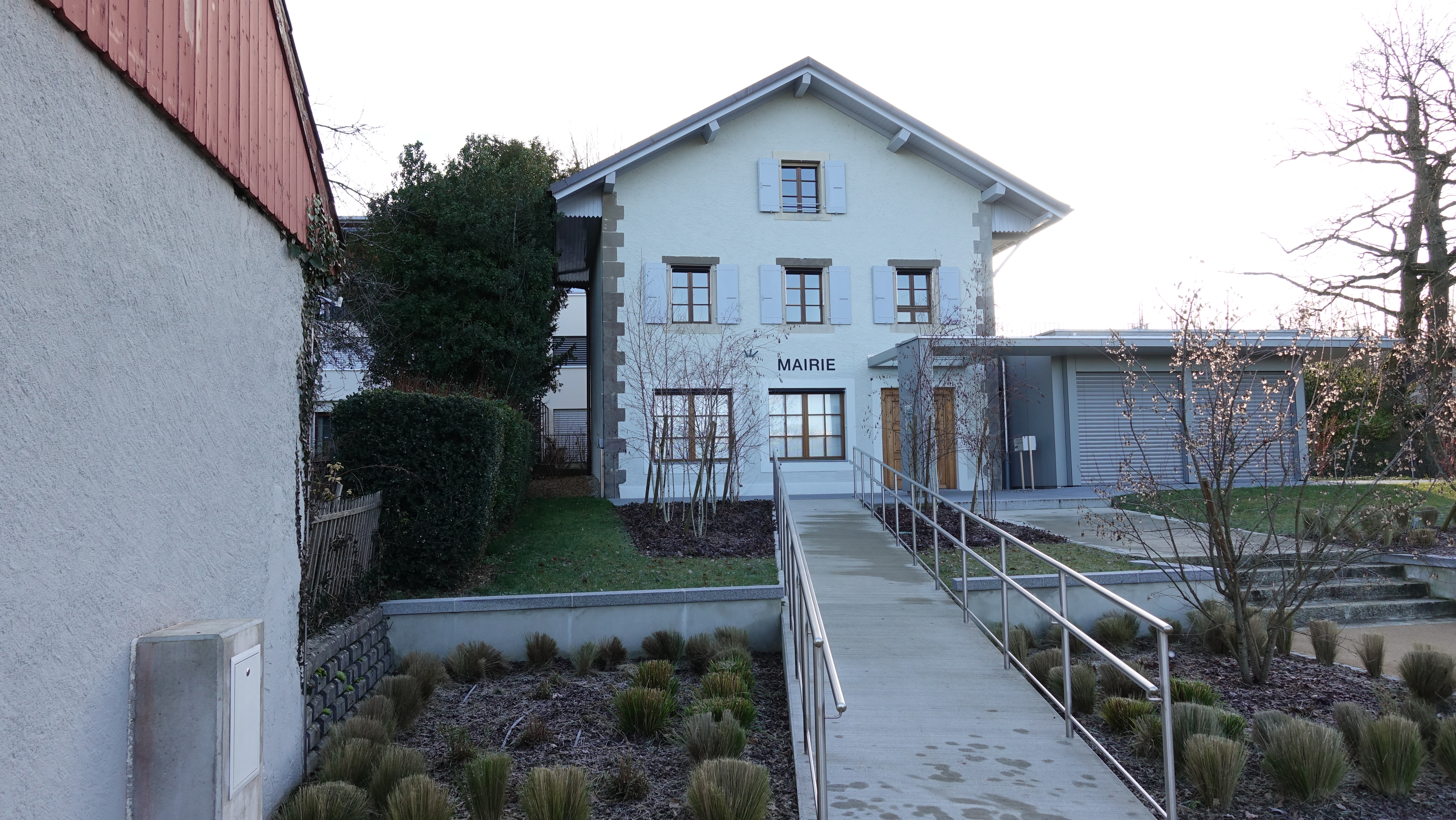

- Coat of arms
- Location of Presinge
- Location within Switzerland Location within Canton of Geneva
- Coordinates: 46.2190839°N 6.2550748°E
- Country: Switzerland
- Canton: Geneva
- District: n.a.

Government
  - Mayor: Maire; Ferdinand Le Comte

Area
  - Total: 4.72 km^{2} (1.82 sq mi)
- Elevation: 460 m (1,510 ft)

Population (December 2020)
  - Total: 696
  - Density: 147/km^{2} (382/sq mi)
- Time zone: UTC+01:00 (CET)
  - Summer (DST): UTC+02:00 (CEST)
- Postal code: 1243
- SFOS number: 6635
- ISO 3166 code: CH-GE
- Surrounded by: Choulex, Jussy, Juvigny (FR-74), Meinier, Puplinge, Ville-la-Grand (FR-74)
- Website: www.presinge.ch

Presinge is a municipality of the canton of Geneva in Switzerland.

== History ==
Presinge is first mentioned after 1000 as in Presiago. In 1180 it was mentioned as villa que appellatur Presingium.

The village of Presinge was part of ancient Burgundy and settled in 443 by 'le peuple germanique des Burgondes'. Regarding the German-sounding names of the surrounding villages - albeit now with French spelling (adding an '-e' to the ending) - the text cites the villages of Presinge, Puplinge, Corsinge, Merlinge, etc. - 'which tended to indicate an area of Germanic preponderance'.

The branch of the noble family (Presinge/Pressinge) that gave its name to the village decreased in influence and number very gradually over the centuries.

There is a copy of an old map dated 1740 by Philippe Bauche (the original is kept in the Bibliothèque de Genève) showing the other old spelling of "Pressinge".^{1}

== Geography ==
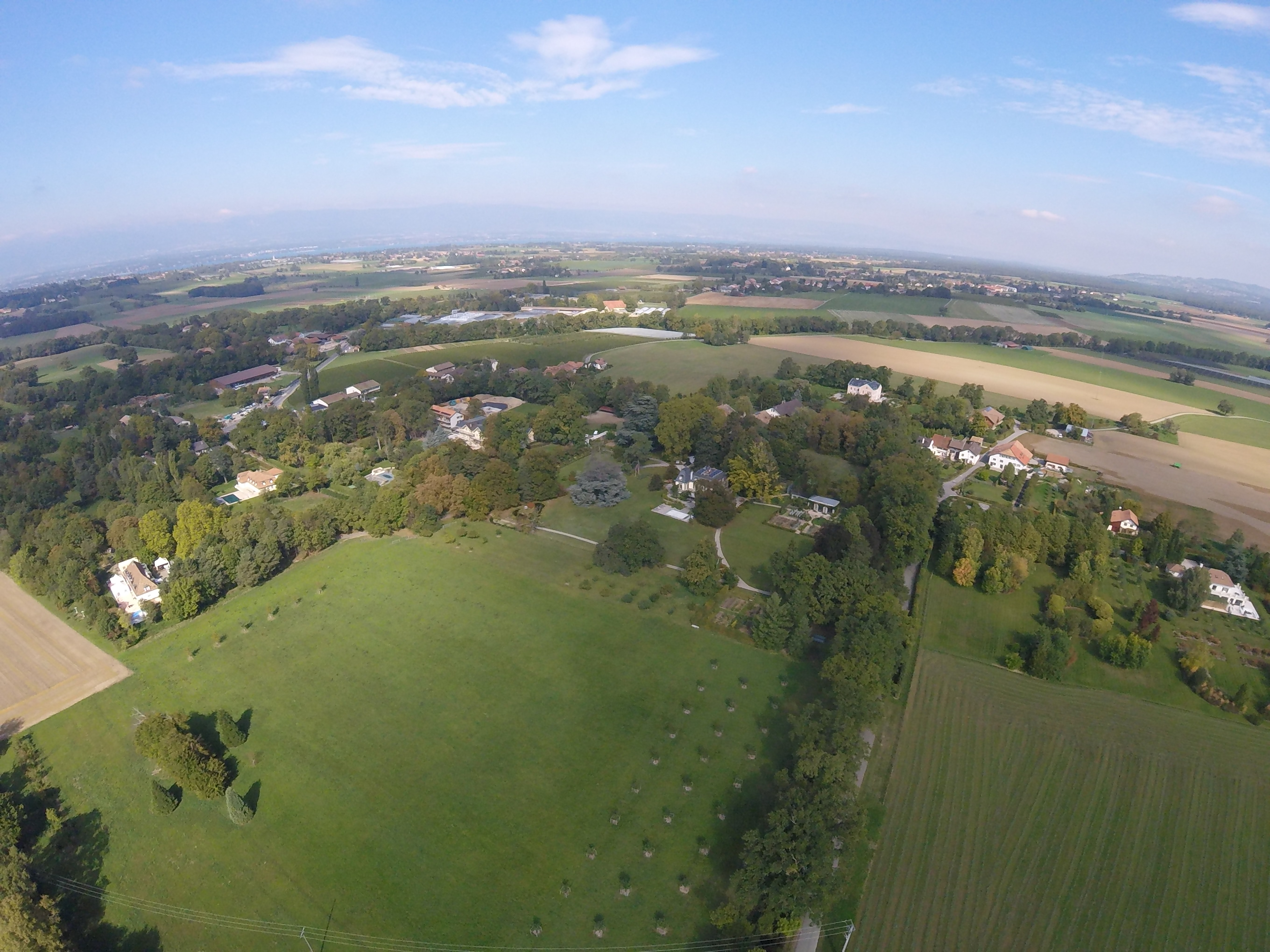
The village of Presinge, aerial view

Aerial view from 2500 m by Walter Mittelholzer (1929)

Presinge has an area, as of 2009, of 4.72 square kilometers (1.82 sq mi). Of this area, 3.2 km^{2} (1.2 sq mi) or 67.8% is used for agricultural purposes, while 0.88 km^{2} (0.34 sq mi) or 18.6% is forested. Of the rest of the land, 0.61 km^{2} (0.24 sq mi) or 12.9% is settled (buildings or roads), 0.02 km^{2} (4.9 acres) or 0.4% is either rivers or lakes and 0.01 km^{2} (2.5 acres) or 0.2% is unproductive land.

Of the built up area, housing and buildings made up 8.5% and transportation infrastructure made up 3.4%. Out of the forested land, 16.3% of the total land area is heavily forested and 2.3% is covered with orchards or small clusters of trees. Of the agricultural land, 54.0% is used for growing crops and 6.6% is pastures, while 7.2% is used for orchards or vine crops. All the water in the municipality is flowing water.

It consists of the village of Presinge and the hamlets of Cara and La Louvière.

The municipality of Presinge consists of the sub-sections or villages of Cara, L'Abbaye, Presinge, La Renfile and La Louvière.

== Demographics ==
Largest groups of foreign residents 2013
Nationality	Amount	% total (population)
France	40	6.2
Eritrea	22	3.4
Portugal	18	2.8
UK	12	1.9
Italy	8	1.2

Presinge has a population (as of December 2020) of 696. As of 2008, 16.3% of the population are resident foreign nationals. Over the last 10 years (1999–2009 ) the population has changed at a rate of 7.8%. It has changed at a rate of 32.1% due to migration and at a rate of -22% due to births and deaths.

Most of the population (as of 2000) speaks French (520 or 84.7%), with Albanian being second most common (22 or 3.6%) and German being third (15 or 2.4%). There are 6 people who speak Italian.

As of 2008, the gender distribution of the population was 47.0% male and 53.0% female. The population was made up of 228 Swiss men (34.7% of the population) and 81 (12.3%) non-Swiss men. There were 266 Swiss women (40.4%) and 83 (12.6%) non-Swiss women. Of the population in the municipality 94 or about 15.3% were born in Presinge and lived there in 2000. There were 207 or 33.7% who were born in the same canton, while 75 or 12.2% were born somewhere else in Switzerland, and 124 or 20.2% were born outside of Switzerland.

In 2008 there were 3 live births to Swiss citizens and were 15 deaths of Swiss citizens and 3 non-Swiss citizen deaths. Ignoring immigration and emigration, the population of Swiss citizens decreased by 12 while the foreign population decreased by 3. There were 3 Swiss men and 5 Swiss women who emigrated from Switzerland. At the same time, there were 10 non-Swiss men and 5 non-Swiss women who immigrated from another country to Switzerland. The total Swiss population change in 2008 (from all sources, including moves across municipal borders) was a decrease of 9 and the non-Swiss population increased by 14 people. This represents a population growth rate of 0.8%. The age distribution of the population (as of 2000) is children and teenagers (0–19 years old) make up 26.7% of the population, while adults (20–64 years old) make up 53.4% and seniors (over 64 years old) make up 19.9%.

As of 2000, there were 256 people who were single and never married in the municipality. There were 264 married individuals, 61 widows or widowers and 33 individuals who are divorced.

As of 2000, there were 184 private households in the municipality, and an average of 2.6 persons per household. There were 52 households that consist of only one person and 19 households with five or more people. Out of a total of 193 households that answered this question, 26.9% were households made up of just one person and there were 2 adults who lived with their parents. Of the rest of the households, there are 48 married couples without children, 66 married couples with children There were 14 single parents with a child or children. There were 2 households that were made up of unrelated people and 9 households that were made up of some sort of institution or another collective housing.

In 2000 there were 78 single family homes (or 62.4% of the total) out of a total of 125 inhabited buildings. There were 20 multi-family buildings (16.0%), along with 22 multi-purpose buildings that were mostly used for housing (17.6%) and 5 other use buildings (commercial or industrial) that also had some housing (4.0%). Of the single family homes 28 were built before 1919, while 10 were built between 1990 and 2000. The most multi-family homes (6) were built before 1919 and the next most (4) were built between 1991 and 1995. There was 1 multi-family house built between 1996 and 2000.

In 2000 there were 194 apartments in the municipality. The most common apartment size was 3 rooms of which there were 44. There were 3 single room apartments and 83 apartments with five or more rooms. Of these apartments, a total of 170 apartments (87.6% of the total) were permanently occupied, while 15 apartments (7.7%) were seasonally occupied and 9 apartments (4.6%) were empty. As of 2009, the construction rate of new housing units was 0 new units per 1000 residents. The vacancy rate for the municipality, in 2010, was 0%.

The historical population is given in the following chart:

== Politics ==
In the 2007 federal election the most popular party was the Green Party which received 21.09% of the vote. The next three most popular parties were the LPS Party (17.51%), the SP (16.05%) and the SP (16.05%). In the federal election, a total of 197 votes were cast, and the voter turnout was 48.6%.

In the 2009 Grand Conseil election, there were a total of 408 registered voters of which 188 (46.1%) voted. The most popular party in the municipality for this election was the Les Verts with 22.5% of the ballots. In the canton-wide election they received the second highest proportion of votes. The second most popular party was the Libéral (with 17.1%), they were first in the canton-wide election, while the third most popular party was the PDC (with 13.9%), they were fifth in the canton-wide election.

For the 2009 Conseil d'Etat election, there were a total of 408 registered voters of which 217 (53.2%) voted.

In 2011, all the municipalities held local elections, and in Presinge there were 11 spots open on the municipal council. There were a total of 431 registered voters of which 245 (56.8%) voted. Out of the 245 votes, there were 1 blank votes, 3 null or unreadable votes and 78 votes with a name that was not on the list.

== Economy ==
As of 2010, Presinge had an unemployment rate of 4.8%. As of 2008, there were 25 people employed in the primary economic sector and about 11 businesses involved in this sector. 5 people were employed in the secondary sector and there were 4 businesses in this sector. 158 people were employed in the tertiary sector, with 15 businesses in this sector. There were 235 residents of the municipality who were employed in some capacity, of which females made up 46.8% of the workforce.

In 2008 the total number of full-time equivalent jobs was 157. The number of jobs in the primary sector was 16, all of which were in agriculture. The number of jobs in the secondary sector was 5 of which 1 was in manufacturing and 4 (80.0%) were in construction. The number of jobs in the tertiary sector was 136. In the tertiary sector; 3 or 2.2% were in wholesale or retail sales or the repair of motor vehicles, 8 or 5.9% were in the movement and storage of goods, 18 or 13.2% were in a hotel or restaurant, 21 or 15.4% were technical professionals or scientists, 2 or 1.5% were in education and 72 or 52.9% were in health care.

In 2000, there were 159 workers who commuted into the municipality and 181 workers who commuted away. The municipality is a net exporter of workers, with about 1.1 workers leaving the municipality for every one entering. About 21.4% of the workforce coming into Presinge are coming from outside Switzerland. Of the working population, 11.5% used public transportation to get to work, and 64.7% used a private car.

== Religion ==
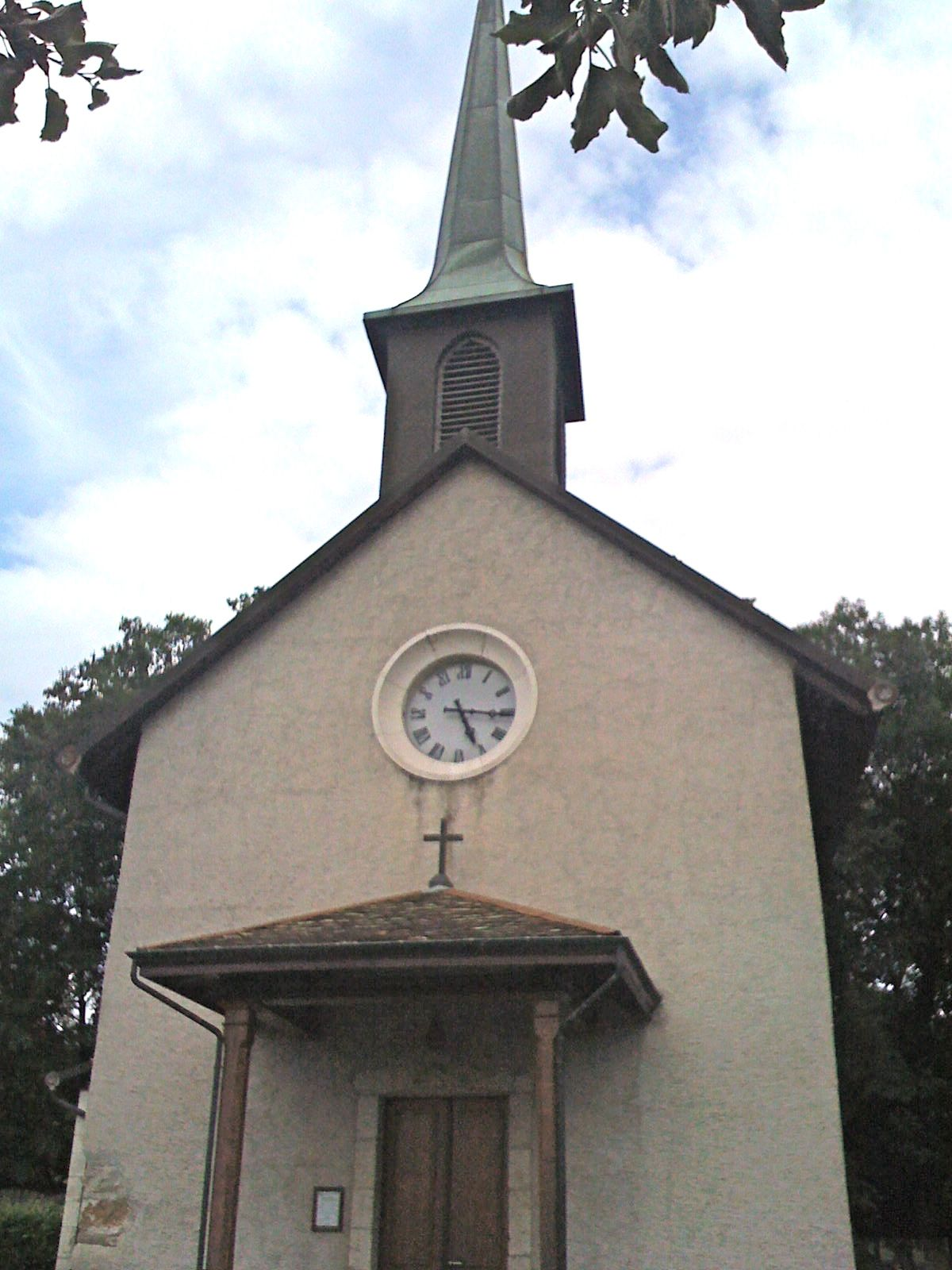
Presinge Church

From the 2000 census, 224 or 36.5% were Roman Catholic, while 139 or 22.6% belonged to the Swiss Reformed Church. Of the rest of the population, there were 2 members of an Orthodox church (or about 0.33% of the population), there were 3 individuals (or about 0.49% of the population) who belonged to the Christian Catholic Church, and there were 6 individuals (or about 0.98% of the population) who belonged to another Christian church. There was 1 individual who was Jewish, and 1 individual who was Islamic, and 1 individual who belonged to another church. 118 (or about 19.22% of the population) belonged to no church, are agnostic or atheist, and 119 individuals (or about 19.38% of the population) did not answer the question.

== Education ==
In Presinge about 151 or (24.6%) of the population have completed non-mandatory upper secondary education, and 133 or (21.7%) have completed additional higher education (either university or a Fachhochschule). Of the 133 who completed tertiary schooling, 46.6% were Swiss men, 37.6% were Swiss women, 9.0% were non-Swiss men and 6.8% were non-Swiss women.

During the 2009-2010 school year there were a total of 126 students in the Presinge school system. The education system in the Canton of Geneva allows young children to attend two years of non-obligatory Kindergarten. During that school year, there were 9 children who were in a pre-kindergarten class. The canton's school system provides two years of non-mandatory kindergarten and requires students to attend six years of primary school, with some of the children attending smaller, specialized classes. In Presinge there were 14 students in kindergarten or primary school and - students were in the special, smaller classes. The secondary school program consists of three lower, obligatory years of schooling, followed by three to five years of optional, advanced schools. There were 14 lower secondary students who attended school in Presinge. There were 28 upper secondary students from the municipality along with 8 students who were in a professional, non-university track program. An additional 23 students attended a private school.

As of 2000, there were 4 students in Presinge who came from another municipality, while 82 residents attended schools outside the municipality.

== Notes ==
1. The old German script symbol ['eszett'] for "ss" is sometimes used in modern German, otherwise it is written as "ss", or sometimes reduced to "s". The old "ss" symbol is no longer used in Swiss-German.
