= Vandœuvres =

- Municipality
- Flag Coat of arms
- Location of Vandœuvres
- Location within Switzerland Location within Canton of Geneva
- Coordinates: 46°13′N 06°12′E
- Country: Switzerland
- Canton: Geneva
- District: n.a.

Government
  - Mayor: Laurence Miserez

Area
  - Total: 4.41 km^{2} (1.70 sq mi)
- Elevation: 490 m (1,610 ft)

Population (2007)
  - Total: 2,754
  - Density: 624/km^{2} (1,620/sq mi)
- Time zone: UTC+01:00 (CET)
  - Summer (DST): UTC+02:00 (CEST)
- Postal code: 1253
- SFOS number: 6642
- ISO 3166 code: CH-GE
- Surrounded by: Chêne-Bougeries, Chêne-Bourg, Choulex, Collonge-Bellerive, Cologny, Thônex
- Website: www.vandoeuvres.ch

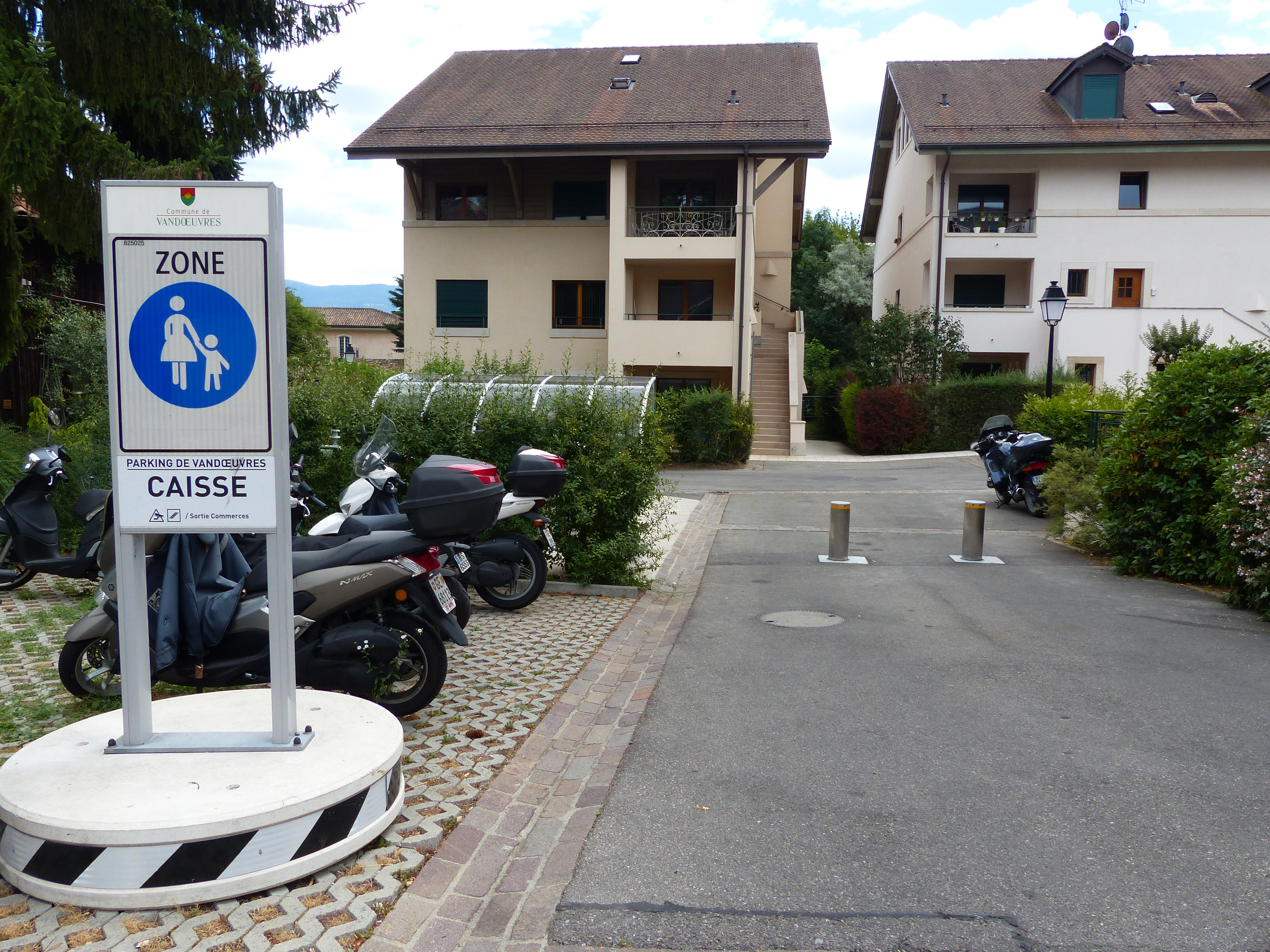
Motorbike parking in Vandœuvres

Vandœuvres is a municipality of the Canton of Geneva, Switzerland.

== Geography ==
Vandœuvres has an area, as of 2009, of 4.41 square kilometers (1.70 sq mi). Of this area, 1.72 km^{2} (0.66 sq mi) or 39.0% is used for agricultural purposes, while 0.26 km^{2} (0.10 sq mi) or 5.9% is forested. Of the rest of the land, 2.43 km^{2} (0.94 sq mi) or 55.1% is settled (buildings or roads).

Of the built up area, housing and buildings made up 37.9% and transportation infrastructure made up 3.9%. Power and water infrastructure as well as other specially developed areas made up 1.1% of the area while parks, green belts and sports fields made up 11.8%. Out of the forested land, 2.3% of the total land area is heavily forested and 3.6% is covered with orchards or small clusters of trees. Of the agricultural land, 28.6% is used for growing crops and 7.9% is pastures, while 2.5% is used for orchards or vine crops.

The municipality of Vandœuvres consists of the sub-sections or villages of Bessinge - La Rippaz, Vandœuvres - village, Crête, Seymaz and Chougny.

== Demographics ==
Largest groups of foreign residents 2013
Nationality	Amount	% total (population)
France	192	7.5
UK	76	2.9
Portugal	68	2.6
Italy	54	2.1
Belgium	41	1.6
Netherlands	38	1.5
USA	38	1.5
Germany	35	1.4
Spain	26	1.0
Russia	25	1.0

Vandœuvres has a population (as of December 2020) of 2,754. As of 2008, 26.8% of the population are resident foreign nationals. Over the last 10 years (1999–2009 ) the population has changed at a rate of 18%. It has changed at a rate of 15% due to migration and at a rate of 2% due to births and deaths.

Most of the population (as of 2000) speaks French (1,876 or 80.4%), with English being second most common (134 or 5.7%) and German being third (131 or 5.6%). There are 42 people who speak Italian and 1 person who speaks Romansh.

As of 2008, the gender distribution of the population was 49.5% male and 50.5% female. The population was made up of 904 Swiss men (33.6% of the population) and 428 (15.9%) non-Swiss men. There were 950 Swiss women (35.3%) and 409 (15.2%) non-Swiss women. Of the population in the municipality 340 or about 14.6% were born in Vandœuvres and lived there in 2000. There were 741 or 31.8% who were born in the same canton, while 332 or 14.2% were born somewhere else in Switzerland, and 856 or 36.7% were born outside of Switzerland.

In 2008 there were 17 live births to Swiss citizens and 9 births to non-Swiss citizens, and in the same time span there were 14 deaths of Swiss citizens and 4 non-Swiss citizen deaths. Ignoring immigration and emigration, the population of Swiss citizens increased by 3 while the foreign population increased by 5. There were 11 Swiss men and 7 Swiss women who emigrated from Switzerland. At the same time, there were 15 non-Swiss men and 10 non-Swiss women who immigrated from another country to Switzerland. The total Swiss population change in 2008 (from all sources, including moves across municipal borders) was a decrease of 16 and the non-Swiss population increased by 22 people. This represents a population growth rate of 0.2%.

The age distribution of the population (as of 2000) is children and teenagers (0–19 years old) make up 28.7% of the population, while adults (20–64 years old) make up 56.1% and seniors (over 64 years old) make up 15.2%.

As of 2000, there were 971 people who were single and never married in the municipality. There were 1,123 married individuals, 112 widows or widowers and 127 individuals who are divorced.

As of 2000, there were 810 private households in the municipality, and an average of 2.7 persons per household. There were 187 households that consist of only one person and 87 households with five or more people. Out of a total of 830 households that answered this question, 22.5% were households made up of just one person and there were 3 adults who lived with their parents. Of the rest of the households, there are 198 married couples without children, 355 married couples with children. There were 55 single parents with a child or children. There were 12 households that were made up of unrelated people and 20 households that were made up of some sort of institution or another collective housing.

In 2000 there were 540 single family homes (or 82.3% of the total) out of a total of 656 inhabited buildings. There were 59 multi-family buildings (9.0%), along with 39 multi-purpose buildings that were mostly used for housing (5.9%) and 18 other use buildings (commercial or industrial) that also had some housing (2.7%). Of the single family homes 84 were built before 1919, while 105 were built between 1990 and 2000. The most multi-family homes (16) were built before 1919 and the next most (14) were built between 1996 and 2000.

In 2000 there were 840 apartments in the municipality. The most common apartment size was 5 rooms of which there were 163. There were 26 single room apartments and 505 apartments with five or more rooms. Of these apartments, a total of 760 apartments (90.5% of the total) were permanently occupied, while 61 apartments (7.3%) were seasonally occupied and 19 apartments (2.3%) were empty. As of 2009, the construction rate of new housing units was 0.8 new units per 1000 residents. The vacancy rate for the municipality, in 2010, was 0.32%.

The historical population is given in the following chart:

== Politics ==
In the 2007 federal election the most popular party was the LPS Party which received 33.97% of the vote. The next three most popular parties were the SVP (23.31%), the Green Party (12.54%) and the SP (8.9%). In the federal election, a total of 834 votes were cast, and the voter turnout was 58.8%.

In the 2009 Grand Conseil election, there were a total of 1,412 registered voters of which 712 (50.4%) voted. The most popular party in the municipality for this election was the Libéral with 39.2% of the ballots. In the canton-wide election they received the highest proportion of votes. The second most popular party was the UDC (with 11.6%), they were seventh in the canton-wide election, while the third most popular party was the Les Verts (with 11.4%), they were second in the canton-wide election.

For the 2009 Conseil d'État election, there were a total of 1,412 registered voters of which 768 (54.4%) voted.

In 2011, all the municipalities held local elections, and in Vandœuvres there were 17 spots open on the municipal council. There were a total of 1,722 registered voters of which 928 (53.9%) voted. Out of the 928 votes, there were 1 blank votes, 1 null or unreadable votes and 76 votes with a name that was not on the list.

== Economy ==
As of 2010, Vandœuvres had an unemployment rate of 2.1%. As of 2008, there were 17 people employed in the primary economic sector and about 7 businesses involved in this sector. 56 people were employed in the secondary sector and there were 10 businesses in this sector. 408 people were employed in the tertiary sector, with 64 businesses in this sector. There were 986 residents of the municipality who were employed in some capacity, of which females made up 40.1% of the workforce.

In 2008 the total number of full-time equivalent jobs was 385. The number of jobs in the primary sector was 13, all of which were in agriculture. The number of jobs in the secondary sector was 54 of which 22 or (40.7%) were in manufacturing and 23 (42.6%) were in construction. The number of jobs in the tertiary sector was 318. In the tertiary sector; 13 or 4.1% were in wholesale or retail sales or the repair of motor vehicles, 17 or 5.3% were in a hotel or restaurant, 3 or 0.9% were the insurance or financial industry, 58 or 18.2% were technical professionals or scientists, 44 or 13.8% were in education and 60 or 18.9% were in health care.

In 2000, there were 328 workers who commuted into the municipality and 802 workers who commuted away. The municipality is a net exporter of workers, with about 2.4 workers leaving the municipality for every one entering. About 24.7% of the workforce coming into Vandœuvres are coming from outside Switzerland, while 0.2% of the locals commute out of Switzerland for work. Of the working population, 13.3% used public transportation to get to work, and 62% used a private car.

== Religion ==
From the 2000 census, 879 or 37.7% were Roman Catholic, while 682 or 29.2% belonged to the Swiss Reformed Church. Of the rest of the population, there were 33 members of an Orthodox church (or about 1.41% of the population), there were 2 individuals (or about 0.09% of the population) who belonged to the Christian Catholic Church, and there were 60 individuals (or about 2.57% of the population) who belonged to another Christian church. There were 92 individuals (or about 3.94% of the population) who were Jewish, and 47 (or about 2.01% of the population) who were Islamic. There were 5 individuals who were Buddhist, 4 individuals who were Hindu and 3 individuals who belonged to another church. 395 (or about 16.93% of the population) belonged to no church, are agnostic or atheist, and 131 individuals (or about 5.62% of the population) did not answer the question.

== Education ==
In Vandœuvres about 561 or (24.0%) of the population have completed non-mandatory upper secondary education, and 761 or (32.6%) have completed additional higher education (either university or a Fachhochschule). Of the 761 who completed tertiary schooling, 40.7% were Swiss men, 30.4% were Swiss women, 17.1% were non-Swiss men and 11.8% were non-Swiss women.

During the 2009-2010 school year there were a total of 627 students in the Vandœuvres school system. The education system in the Canton of Geneva allows young children to attend two years of non-obligatory Kindergarten. During that school year, there were 35 children who were in a pre-kindergarten class. The canton's school system provides two years of non-mandatory kindergarten and requires students to attend six years of primary school, with some of the children attending smaller, specialized classes. In Vandœuvres there were 61 students in kindergarten or primary school and 6 students were in the special, smaller classes. The secondary school program consists of three lower, obligatory years of schooling, followed by three to five years of optional, advanced schools. There were 61 lower secondary students who attended school in Vandœuvres. There were 103 upper secondary students from the municipality along with 11 students who were in a professional, non-university track program. An additional 229 students attended a private school.

As of 2000, there were 33 students in Vandœuvres who came from another municipality, while 377 residents attended schools outside the municipality.
