= Jussy, Switzerland =

Jussy
- Municipality
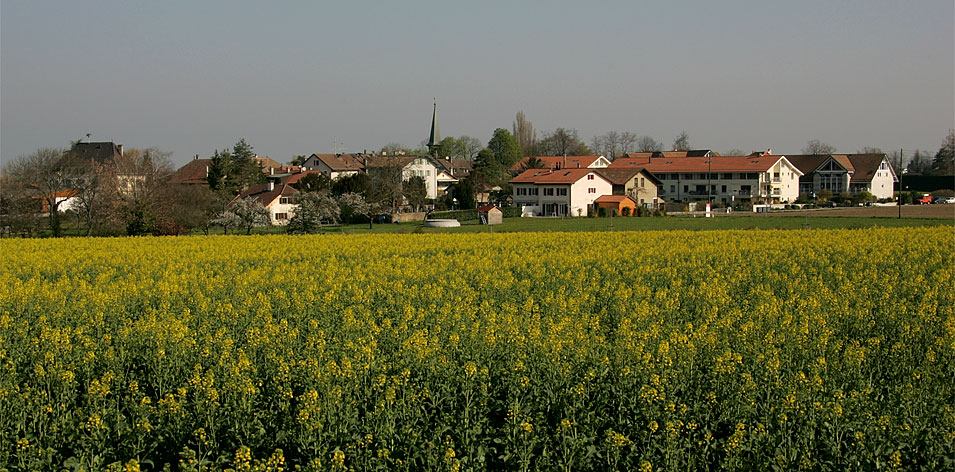

- Flag Coat of arms
- Location of Jussy
- Location within Switzerland Location within Canton of Geneva
- Coordinates: 46°15′N 06°017′E
- Country: Switzerland
- Canton: Geneva
- District: n.a.

Government
  - Mayor: Maire; Luc-Eric Revillod

Area
  - Total: 11.35 km^{2} (4.38 sq mi)
- Elevation: 470 m (1,540 ft)

Population (December 2020)
  - Total: 1,233
  - Density: 108.6/km^{2} (281.4/sq mi)
- Time zone: UTC+01:00 (CET)
  - Summer (DST): UTC+02:00 (CEST)
- Postal code: 1254
- SFOS number: 6626
- ISO 3166 code: CH-GE
- Surrounded by: Gy, Juvigny (FR-74), Machilly (FR-74), Meinier, Presinge, Saint-Cergues (FR-74)
- Website: www.jussy.ch

Jussy (French pronunciation: [ʒysi]) is a municipality of the Canton of Geneva, Switzerland. The historical Chateau Du Crest is located here.

== History ==
Jussy is first mentioned in 1180 as Jussiacum Episcopi.

== Geography ==
Jussy has an area, as of 2009, of 11.35 square kilometers (4.38 sq mi). Of this area, 6.24 km^{2} (2.41 sq mi) or 55.0% is used for agricultural purposes, while 4.17 km^{2} (1.61 sq mi) or 36.7% is forested. Of the rest of the land, 0.92 km^{2} (0.36 sq mi) or 8.1% is settled (buildings or roads), 0.02 km^{2} (4.9 acres) or 0.2% is either rivers or lakes.

Of the built up area, housing and buildings made up 5.8% and transportation infrastructure made up 1.9%. Out of the forested land, all of the forested land area is covered with heavy forests. Of the agricultural land, 45.8% is used for growing crops and 3.6% is pastures, while 5.6% is used for orchards or vine crops. All the water in the municipality is flowing water.

The municipality is located on the left bank of the Rhone river and on the Swiss-French border. It is one of the largest municipalities in the entire canton. The highest point of the canton of Geneva Les Arales (516 m (1,693 ft)) is located at the far east side of the municipality, near Monniaz. It consists of the village of Jussy and the hamlets of Sionnet and Monniaz.

The municipality of Jussy consists of the sub-sections or villages of Sionnet, Château-du-Crest, Jussy - village, Lullier, Jussy - Les Meurets, Jussy - Grands-Bois and Monniaz.

== Demographics ==
Largest groups of foreign residents 2013
Nationality	Amount	% total (population)
France	87	7.0
UK	40	3.2
Portugal	32	2.6
Netherlands	16	1.3
Italy	12	1.0
Belgium	9	0.7
Spain	8	0.6
Germany	6	0.5
Poland	6	0.5
USA	6	0.5

Jussy has a population (as of December 2020) of 1,233. As of 2008, 20.6% of the population are resident foreign nationals. Over the last 10 years (1999–2009) the population has changed at a rate of 16.7%. It has changed at a rate of 10.2% due to migration and at a rate of 5.6% due to births and deaths.

Most of the population (as of 2000) speaks French (995 or 89.9%), with German being second most common (35 or 3.2%) and English being third (21 or 1.9%). There are 14 people who speak Italian.

As of 2008, the gender distribution of the population was 51.4% male and 48.6% female. The population was made up of 494 Swiss men (40.7% of the population) and 130 (10.7%) non-Swiss men. There were 481 Swiss women (39.6%) and 109 (9.0%) non-Swiss women. Of the population in the municipality 261 or about 23.6% were born in Jussy and lived there in 2000. There were 319 or 28.8% who were born in the same canton, while 233 or 21.0% were born somewhere else in Switzerland, and 252 or 22.8% were born outside of Switzerland.

In 2008 there were 9 live births to Swiss citizens and 1 birth to non-Swiss citizens, and in same time span there were 5 deaths of Swiss citizens. Ignoring immigration and emigration, the population of Swiss citizens increased by 4 while the foreign population increased by 1. There were 8 Swiss men and 7 Swiss women who emigrated from Switzerland. At the same time, there were 4 non-Swiss men who immigrated from another country to Switzerland and 2 non-Swiss women who emigrated from Switzerland to another country. The total Swiss population change in 2008 (from all sources, including moves across municipal borders) was a decrease of 4 and the non-Swiss population increased by 16 people. This represents a population growth rate of 1.0%.

The age distribution of the population (as of 2000) is children and teenagers (0–19 years old) make up 30.8% of the population, while adults (20–64 years old) make up 57.4% and seniors (over 64 years old) make up 11.8%.

As of 2000, there were 506 people who were single and never married in the municipality. There were 494 married individuals, 42 widows or widowers and 65 individuals who are divorced.

As of 2000, there were 388 private households in the municipality, and an average of 2.5 persons per household. There were 102 households that consist of only one person and 31 households with five or more people. Out of a total of 405 households that answered this question, 25.2% were households made up of just one person and there were 3 adults who lived with their parents. Of the rest of the households, there are 107 married couples without children, 138 married couples with children There were 33 single parents with a child or children. There were 5 households that were made up of unrelated people and 17 households that were made up of some sort of institution or another collective housing.

In 2000 there were 135 single family homes (or 53.6% of the total) out of a total of 252 inhabited buildings. There were 63 multi-family buildings (25.0%), along with 44 multi-purpose buildings that were mostly used for housing (17.5%) and 10 other use buildings (commercial or industrial) that also had some housing (4.0%). Of the single family homes 65 were built before 1919, while 8 were built between 1990 and 2000.

In 2000 there were 436 apartments in the municipality. The most common apartment size was 4 rooms of which there were 100. There were 28 single room apartments and 175 apartments with five or more rooms. Of these apartments, a total of 379 apartments (86.9% of the total) were permanently occupied, while 39 apartments (8.9%) were seasonally occupied and 18 apartments (4.1%) were empty. As of 2009, the construction rate of new housing units was 0 new units per 1000 residents. The vacancy rate for the municipality, in 2010, was 0.41%.

The historical population is given in the following chart:

== Heritage sites of national significance ==
The Crest Castle and outbuildings are listed as a Swiss heritage site of national significance. The entire village of Jussy and the hamlet of Sionnet at part of the Inventory of Swiss Heritage Sites.

== Politics ==
In the 2007 federal election the most popular party was the SVP which received 25.08% of the vote. The next three most popular parties were the LPS Party (24.2%), the Green Party (16.67%) and the FDP (10.95%). In the federal election, a total of 414 votes were cast, and the voter turnout was 57.1%.

In the 2009 Grand Conseil election, there were a total of 723 registered voters of which 340 (47.0%) voted. The most popular party in the municipality for this election was the Libéral with 29.3% of the ballots. In the canton-wide election they received the highest proportion of votes. The second most popular party was the Les Verts (with 14.1%), they were also second in the canton-wide election, while the third most popular party was the MCG (with 13.2%), they were also third in the canton-wide election.

For the 2009 Conseil d'Etat election, there were a total of 726 registered voters of which 426 (58.7%) voted.

In 2011, all the municipalities held local elections, and in Jussy there were 13 spots open on the municipal council. There were a total of 826 registered voters of which 545 (66.0%) voted. Out of the 545 votes, there were 10 blank votes, 47 votes with a name that was not on the list.

== Economy ==
As of 2010, Jussy had an unemployment rate of 2.5%. As of 2008, there were 69 people employed in the primary economic sector and about 25 businesses involved in this sector. 36 people were employed in the secondary sector and there were 12 businesses in this sector. 279 people were employed in the tertiary sector, with 37 businesses in this sector. There were 517 residents of the municipality who were employed in some capacity, of which females made up 41.6% of the workforce.

In 2008 the total number of full-time equivalent jobs was 325. The number of jobs in the primary sector was 46, all of which were in agriculture. The number of jobs in the secondary sector was 33 of which 13 or (39.4%) were in manufacturing and 20 (60.6%) were in construction. The number of jobs in the tertiary sector was 246. In the tertiary sector; 48 or 19.5% were in wholesale or retail sales or the repair of motor vehicles, 15 or 6.1% were in a hotel or restaurant, 2 or 0.8% were in the information industry, 6 or 2.4% were technical professionals or scientists, 158 or 64.2% were in education and 3 or 1.2% were in health care.

In 2000, there were 212 workers who commuted into the municipality and 368 workers who commuted away. The municipality is a net exporter of workers, with about 1.7 workers leaving the municipality for every one entering. About 16.0% of the workforce coming into Jussy are coming from outside Switzerland. Of the working population, 11.4% used public transportation to get to work, and 66.2% used a private car.

== Religion ==
From the 2000 census, 383 or 34.6% were Roman Catholic, while 411 or 37.1% belonged to the Swiss Reformed Church. Of the rest of the population, there were 9 members of an Orthodox church (or about 0.81% of the population), and there were 9 individuals (or about 0.81% of the population) who belonged to another Christian church. There were 7 individuals (or about 0.63% of the population) who were Jewish, and 5 (or about 0.45% of the population) who were Islamic. There was 1 person who was Buddhist and 2 individuals who belonged to another church. 220 (or about 19.87% of the population) belonged to no church, are agnostic or atheist, and 60 individuals (or about 5.42% of the population) did not answer the question.

== Weather ==
Jussy has an average of 118 days of rain or snow per year and on average receives 953 mm (37.5 in) of precipitation. The wettest month is June during which time Jussy receives an average of 97 mm (3.8 in) of rain or snow. During this month there is precipitation for an average of 10.1 days. The month with the most days of precipitation is May, with an average of 11.8, but with only 93 mm (3.7 in) of rain or snow. The driest month of the year is July with an average of 69 mm (2.7 in) of precipitation over 8.1 days.

== Education ==
In Jussy about 320 or (28.9%) of the population have completed non-mandatory upper secondary education, and 262 or (23.7%) have completed additional higher education (either university or a Fachhochschule). Of the 262 who completed tertiary schooling, 40.5% were Swiss men, 35.5% were Swiss women, 13.7% were non-Swiss men and 10.3% were non-Swiss women.

During the 2009-2010 school year there were a total of 278 students in the Jussy school system. The education system in the Canton of Geneva allows young children to attend two years of non-obligatory Kindergarten. During that school year, there were 23 children who were in a pre-kindergarten class. The canton's school system provides two years of non-mandatory kindergarten and requires students to attend six years of primary school, with some of the children attending smaller, specialized classes. In Jussy there were 22 students in kindergarten or primary school and 4 students were in the special, smaller classes. The secondary school program consists of three lower, obligatory years of schooling, followed by three to five years of optional, advanced schools. There were 22 lower secondary students who attended school in Jussy. There were 54 upper secondary students from the municipality along with 22 students who were in a professional, non-university track program. An additional 48 students attended a private school.

As of 2000, there were 201 students in Jussy who came from another municipality, while 95 residents attended schools outside the municipality.

Jussy is home to the Ecole d'Ingénieurs de Lullier (EIL) library. The library has (as of 2008) 12,615 books or other media, and loaned out 11,124 items in the same year. It was open a total of 355 days with average of 49 hours per week during that year.
