= Crest Castle =

Castle in Jussy in Geneva, Switzerland

Coordinates: 46°14′10″N 6°15′24″E

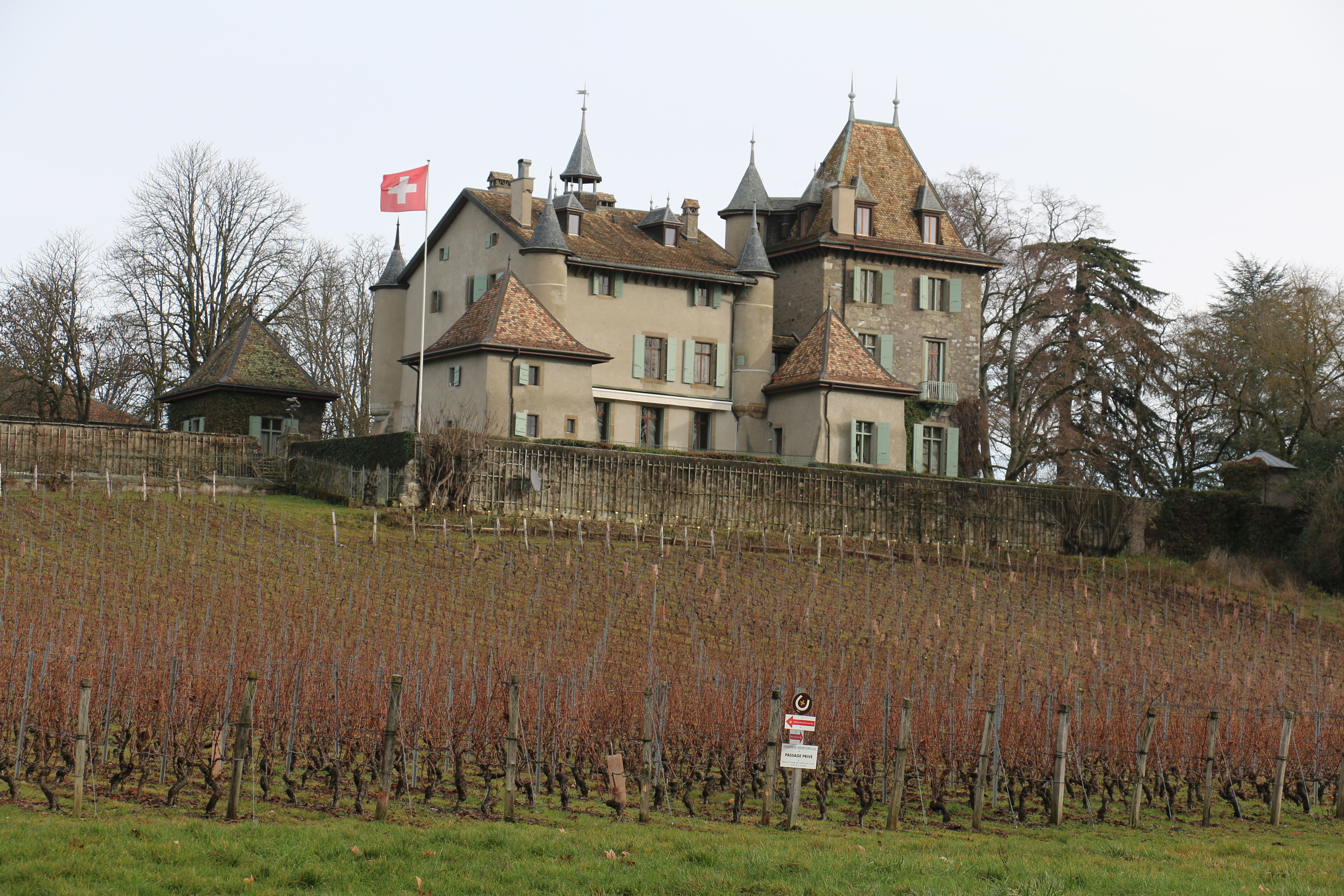
Crest Castle

The Château Du Crest is a castle in the municipality of Jussy of the Canton of Geneva in Switzerland. It is a Swiss heritage site of national significance.

It is the only wine producing chateau in the left Bank of Lake Geneva in the Canton of Geneva.

== History ==
Jussy was a vassal town of the Bishop of Geneva in the Middle Ages. The chateau was built on the grounds owned by the Bishop, circa 1220. Several families, such as the de Compesières and the de Rovorée clans, took turns in looking after the castle and its domains for the Bishop who had the legal jurisdiction over it.

With the advent of Reformation, the castle found itself in the middle of the intrigues between the city fathers of Geneva, who dislodged the Bishop as the lord of the city state in 1536, and the Duke of Savoy. The lord occupant of the castle, Michel de Blonay, refused to abandon his Catholic faith and side with Calvinism. Several attempts at resistance followed. With the defeat of the Saoy Duchy in the war of Escalade in 1598, the castle was taken by the Calvinists and destroyed in the 1590s. With the Treaty of St. Julien in 1603 that recognized Geneva as a Republic, the castle fell into ruins.

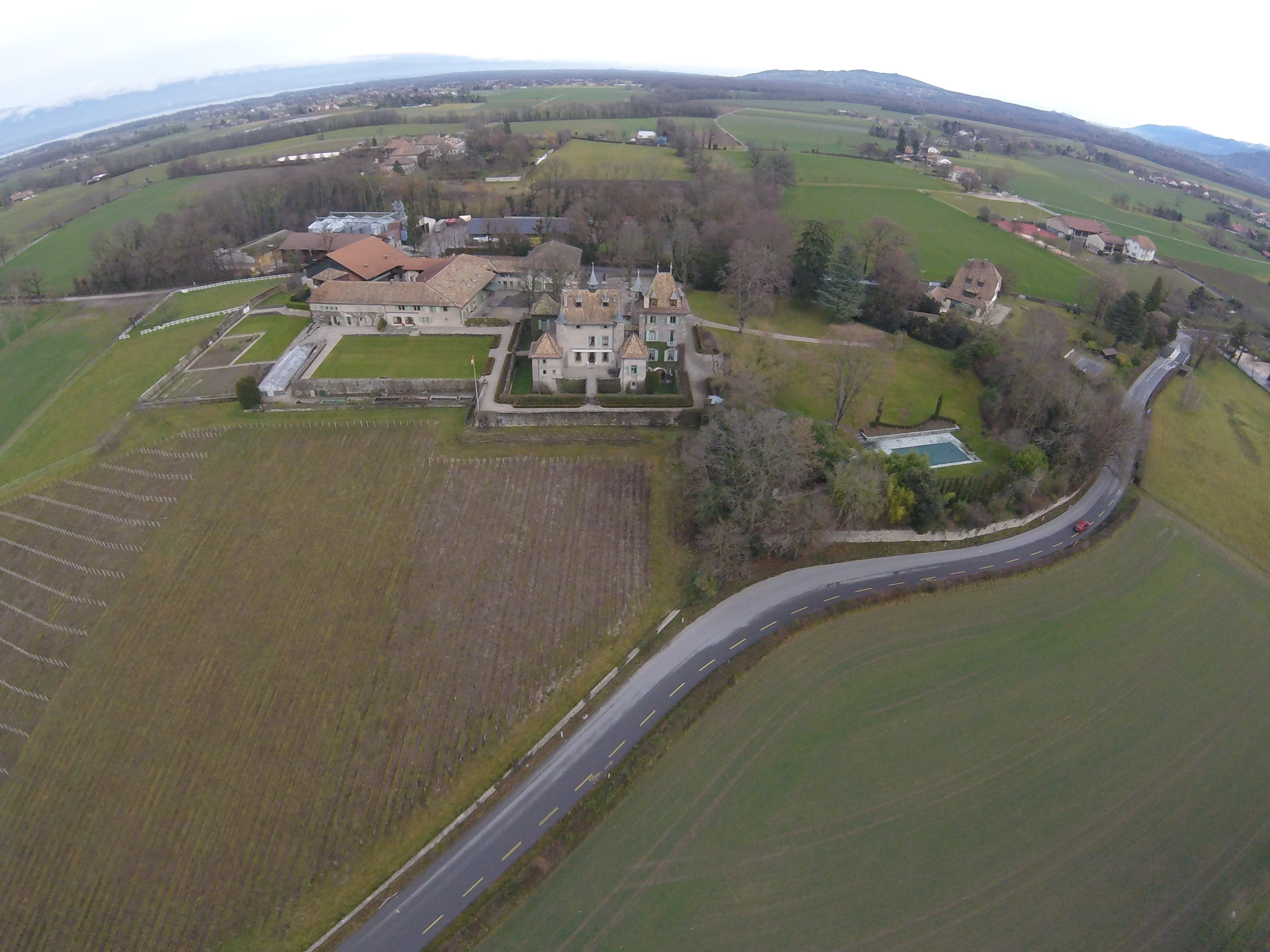
Aerial view of Crest Castle

Agrippa d'Aubigné, a nobleman and reformed French Huguenot squire of Henry IV, was expelled from France as result of his participation in the conspiracy against Duke of Luynes before acquiring the rights to the ruins of the chateau. Hired to direct the work of fortification in the cantons of Geneva, Bern and Basel, d'Aubigné rebuilt the castle du Crest. Due to the previous experiences with fortifications this close to Geneva, the city fathers did not want to see a fortified structure and hence permitted only the right to build "a manor house to safeguard against thieves and murderers."

However, Agrippa d'Aubigné went beyond the permission granted to him. He built fortifications regardless, such as turrets, loopholes, a drawbridge, and a deep moat. He justified this to Geneva as a protection against papal armies. d'Aubigné died in 1630, and the castle passed into the hands of the Micheli family.

In 1637, Jacques Micheli of Lucca in Tuscany acquired the lordship. His descendants own the property to this day. The family played an important part in shaping the politics of Geneva and held several important positions. This changed with Jacques-Barthélemi Micheli du Crest (1690–1766) who was a declared enemy of the state. A bright politician and inventor of a thermometer published the "Maxims of a Republican" and was openly critical of the city fathers. He was exiled and sentenced to death in absentia. His descendants retained the rights of the castle. Since 2005, the Castle has been looked after by the Foundation Micheli-du-Crest.

== See also ==
- List of castles in Switzerland
- Château
