= List of cultural property of national significance in Switzerland: Geneva =

This list contains all cultural property of national significance (class A) in the canton of Geneva from the 2009 Swiss Inventory of Cultural Property of National and Regional Significance. It is sorted by municipality and contains 86 individual buildings, 46 collections and 10 archaeological finds.

The geographic coordinates provided are in the Swiss coordinate system as given in the Inventory.

== Avully ==
KGS No.^{?}	Picture	Name	Street Address	CH1903 X coordinate	CH1903 Y coordinate	Location
Unknown		ISOS village: Avully				

== Avusy ==
KGS No.^{?}	Picture	Name	Street Address	CH1903 X coordinate	CH1903 Y coordinate	Location
Unknown		ISOS village: Sézegnin				

== Bardonnex ==
KGS No.^{?}	Picture	Name	Street Address	CH1903 X coordinate	CH1903 Y coordinate	Location
2382; 8665	Compesières Commandry and Museum of the Order of Malta	Compesières Commandry and Museum of the Order of Malta	Route De Cugny 97, 99	498.176	112.016	46.151929°N 6.12061°E
2383	Domaine Micheli	Domaine Micheli	Landecy, Route du Prieur 42–67	498.756	111.285	46.145441°N 6.128274°E
Unknown		ISOS village: Landecy				
Unknown		ISOS cas particulier: Compesières				

== Carouge ==
KGS No.^{?}	Picture	Name	Street Address	CH1903 X coordinate	CH1903 Y coordinate	Location
8866	Archives of Carouge	Archives of Carouge	Place Du Marché 14	499.732	115.589	46.184298°N 6.139982°E
Unknown		ISOS ville: Carouge				

== Cartigny ==
KGS No.^{?}	Picture	Name	Street Address	CH1903 X coordinate	CH1903 Y coordinate	Location
Unknown		ISOS village: Cartigny				

== Céligny ==
KGS No.^{?}	Picture	Name	Street Address	CH1903 X coordinate	CH1903 Y coordinate	Location
2402	Domaine De Garengo	Domaine De Garengo	Route De Céligny 73–77	504.241	133.908	46.349724°N 6.19461°E
2403	Domaine de l’Elysée	Domaine de l’Elysée	Route de Crans 6–12	504.369	134.039	46.35092°N 6.196246°E
Unknown		ISOS village: Céligny				

== Chêne-Bougeries ==
KGS No.^{?}	Picture	Name	Street Address	CH1903 X coordinate	CH1903 Y coordinate	Location
10014	Grange Falquet	Grange Falquet	Chemin De Grange-Falquet 22	503.559	117.297	46.20022°N 6.189187°E
2407	Temple	Temple	Route de Chêne 153	503.542	117.008	46.197618°N 6.189027°E

== Collonge-Bellerive ==
KGS No.^{?}	Picture	Name	Street Address	CH1903 X coordinate	CH1903 Y coordinate	Location
9602		Bellerive I Bronze Age, Littoral Archeological Site		503.765	123.190	46.253253°N 6.190642°E
2416	Bellerive Castle	Bellerive Castle	Chemin du Milieu 25	504.167	123.687	46.257781°N 6.195752°E
2417	Villa-chalet du Prince Essling	Villa-chalet du Prince Essling	Chemin du Milieu 27	504.242	123.775	46.258583°N 6.196706°E

== Cologny ==
KGS No.^{?}	Picture	Name	Street Address	CH1903 X coordinate	CH1903 Y coordinate	Location
9330	Bibliotheca Bodmeriana	Bibliotheca Bodmeriana	Route Du Guignard 19, 21	502.924	118.980	46.215266°N 6.180613°E
11743	Campagne Diodati	Campagne Diodati	Chemin de Ruth 9	503.140	119.529	46.220235°N 6.183297°E

== Corsier ==
KGS No.^{?}	Picture	Name	Street Address	CH1903 X coordinate	CH1903 Y coordinate	Location
9603	Port Prehistoric Lakeside Settlement	Port; Prehistoric Lakeside Settlement		505.320	124.830	46.268225°N 6.210471°E

== Dardagny ==
KGS No.^{?}	Picture	Name	Street Address	CH1903 X coordinate	CH1903 Y coordinate	Location
2431	Dardagny Castle	Dardagny Castle	Route Du Mandement 520	488.584	116.891	46.194257°N 5.995316°E
10015	Farm House Bellevaux	Farm House Bellevaux	Malval, Chemin des Tassonnières 2	488.272	118.821	46.211564°N 5.990814°E
Unknown		ISOS village: Dardagny				
Unknown		ISOS hameau: Malval				

== Genève ==
KGS No.^{?}	Picture	Name	Street Address	CH1903 X coordinate	CH1903 Y coordinate	Location
2436; 8789	Former Arsenal and Archives of the City of Genève	Former Arsenal and Archives of the City of Genève	Rue De L’Hôtel-De-Ville 1	500.312	117.449	46.201114°N 6.147096°E
2511	Former Crédit Lyonnais	Former Crédit Lyonnais	Quai de la Poste 18	499.947	117.786	46.204091°N 6.142296°E
2462	Former Hôtel Buisson	Former Hôtel Buisson	Rue Jean-Calvin 13	500.337	117.547	46.201999°N 6.147399°E
2504; 9300	Former Hôtel du Résident de France et Bibliothèque de la Société de lecture de Genève	Former Hôtel du Résident de France et Bibliothèque de la Société de lecture de Genève	Grand-Rue 11	500.170	117.560	46.202091°N 6.145233°E
2514	Former école des arts industriels	Former école des arts industriels	Boulevard James-Fazy 15	499.878	118.319	46.208875°N 6.141288°E
11602	Archives d’Etat de Genève (Annexe)	Archives d’Etat de Genève (Annexe)	Rue de la Terrassière 52	500.312	117.449	46.201114°N 6.147096°E
2500	Bâtiment des Forces motrices	Bâtiment des Forces motrices	Place des Volontaires 2	499.515	117.841	46.204521°N 6.136688°E
8925; 9329	Bibliothèque de Genève	Bibliothèque de Genève	Promenade des Bastions 1	500.165	117.200	46.198853°N 6.145245°E
9299	Jewish Library of Geneva «Gérard Nordmann»	Jewish Library of Geneva «Gérard Nordmann»	Avenue Dumas 21	501.014	116.316	46.191027°N 6.156429°E
8937	International Labour Organization (BIT)	International Labour Organization (BIT)	Archives historiques, Route des Morillons 4	499.381	120.604	46.229353°N 6.134357°E
Unknown		Cabinet des estampes	Promenade du Pin 5	500.582	117.140	46.198375°N 6.150659°E
2443	Cathedral St-Pierre et Chapel des Macchabés	Cathedral St-Pierre et Chapel des Macchabés	avec site archéologique, Cour de St-Pierre	500.421	117.452	46.201157°N 6.148507°E
2444	Centre d’Iconographie genevoise	Centre d’Iconographie genevoise	Passage de la Tour 2	500.254	116.799	46.195259°N 6.146483°E
2446	Collège Calvin	Collège Calvin	Rue Theodore-de-Beze 2–4	500.598	117.393	46.200653°N 6.150812°E
8846	International Committee of the Red Cross (CICR)	International Committee of the Red Cross (CICR)	Avenue de la Paix 19	499.601	120.422	46.227748°N 6.137247°E
2510	Conservatoire de musique	Conservatoire de musique	Place Neuve 5	499.956	117.429	46.200881°N 6.142489°E
2447; 11816; 9364	Botanical Garden Villa «Le Chêne» «La Console»	Botanical Garden; Villa «Le Chêne» «La Console»	Chemin de l’Impératrice 1 / Route de Lausanne 192	500.300	120.400	46.227654°N 6.146311°E
9016	Ecole Geisendorf	Ecole Geisendorf	Rue de Lyon 56	499.055	118.450	46.20993°N 6.130597°E
2448	Basilica Notre-Dame of Geneva	Basilica Notre-Dame of Geneva	Place de Cornavin	499.963	118.299	46.208707°N 6.142393°E
2449	Russian Church	Russian Church	Rue Toepffer 9	500.820	117.190	46.198859°N 6.153731°E
2450	St-Germain Church	St-Germain Church	Rue de Saint-Germain 2	500.238	117.479	46.201373°N 6.146131°E
8691	Fondation Baur, Museum of the arts d’Extrême-Orient	Fondation Baur, Museum of the arts d’Extrême-Orient	Rue Munier-Romilly 8	500.788	117.050	46.197596°N 6.153346°E
8758	Fonds cantonal d’art contemporain	Fonds cantonal d’art contemporain	Sentier des Saules 3	499.039	117.620	46.202462°N 6.130569°E
8938	United Nations High Commissioner for Refugees (UNHCR)	United Nations High Commissioner for Refugees (UNHCR)	Rue de Montbrillant 94	499.886	119.620	46.220577°N 6.141113°E
9155	Hôpitaux universitaires de Genève (HUG)	Hôpitaux universitaires de Genève (HUG)	Archives centrales, Rue Micheli-du-Crest 24	500.431	116.613	46.193612°N 6.148815°E
2451	City Hall and Baudet Tower	City Hall and Baudet Tower	Rue de l’Hôtel-de-Ville 2	500.272	117.419	46.200838°N 6.146584°E
2452	Ile Rousseau et statue	Ile Rousseau et statue	Ile Jean-Jacques-Rousseau 1	500.369	117.977	46.205871°N 6.147722°E
2453	Immeuble Clarté	Immeuble Clarté	Rue Saint-Laurent 2, 4	501.030	117.331	46.200159°N 6.156421°E
2543	Immeubles House Rotonde	Immeubles House Rotonde	Rue Charles-Giron 11–19	498.919	118.001	46.205871°N 6.128932°E
2454	Immeubles	Immeubles	Rue Beauregard 2, 4, 6, 8	500.418	117.172	46.198638°N 6.148528°E
2455	Immeubles	Immeubles	Rue de la Corraterie 10–26	500.009	117.636	46.202751°N 6.143131°E
2456	Immeubles	Immeubles	Rue des Granges 2–6	500.131	117.494	46.201492°N 6.144742°E
9410	Immeuble	Immeuble	Rue des Granges 8	500.170	117.467	46.201255°N 6.145253°E
11744	Immeubles	Immeubles	Rue des Granges 10,12	500.195	117.467	46.201259°N 6.145576°E
11745	Immeuble	Immeuble	Rue des Granges 14	500.214	117.458	46.20118°N 6.145824°E
9081	Immeuble, Former Armory	Immeuble, Former Armory	Rue des Granges 16	500.222	117.440	46.20102°N 6.145932°E
2457	Immeubles	Immeubles	Rue Pierre Fatio 7, 9	500.885	117.686	46.20333°N 6.154468°E
2460; 11607; 8678; 11606	Voltaire Institute and Museum with Library and Archives	Voltaire Institute and Museum with Library and Archives	Rue des Délices 25	499.270	118.192	46.207642°N 6.133438°E
2464	De Saussure House	De Saussure House	Rue de la Cité 24	500.086	117.611	46.202538°N 6.144134°E
9471	Maison des arts du Grütli	Maison des arts du Grütli	Rue du Général-Dufour 16	499.878	117.454	46.201095°N 6.141473°E
2465; 8703	Mallet House and Museum international de la Réforme	Mallet House and Museum international de la Réforme	Rue du Cloître 2	500.400	117.489	46.201487°N 6.148227°E
2560	House Royale et les deux immeubles à côté	House Royale et les deux immeubles à côté	Quai Gustave Ador 44–50	501.397	118.076	46.206913°N 6.161018°E
2466	Tavel House	Tavel House	Rue du Puits-St-Pierre 6	500.310	117.482	46.20141°N 6.147063°E
2467	Turrettini House	Turrettini House	Rue de l’Hôtel-de-Ville 8, 10	500.349	117.375	46.200454°N 6.147591°E
2469	Brunswick Monument	Brunswick Monument	Quai du Mont Blanc	500.465	118.264	46.208467°N 6.148904°E
2471; 8680	Musée Ariana	Musée Ariana	Avenue de la Paix 10	499.719	120.161	46.225419°N 6.138833°E
2473; 8692	Musée d'Art et d'Histoire	Musée d'Art et d'Histoire	Rue Charles-Galland 2	500.635	117.257	46.199435°N 6.151321°E
8729; 8679	Museum d’art moderne et contemporain (MAMCO) et Fonds d’art contemporain de la Ville de Genève (FMAC)	Museum d’art moderne et contemporain (MAMCO) et Fonds d’art contemporain de la Ville de Genève (FMAC)	Rue des Vieux-Grenadiers 10	499.587	117.194	46.198713°N 6.137759°E
8681	Musée d'ethnographie	Musée d'ethnographie	Boulevard Carl-Vogt 65, 67	499.549	117.095	46.197817°N 6.137288°E
8682	Museum of the International Red Cross (MICR)	Museum of the International Red Cross (MICR)	Avenue de la Paix 17	499.573	120.374	46.227313°N 6.136895°E
2564	Musée Rath	Musée Rath	Place Neuve	500.040	117.515	46.201667°N 6.143558°E
8666	Muséum d’histoire naturelle	Muséum d’histoire naturelle	Route de Malagnou 1	501.192	117.232	46.199292°N 6.158541°E
8936	World Meteorological Organization (OMM)	World Meteorological Organization (OMM)	Avenue de la Paix 7	500.389	119.946	46.223584°N 6.147561°E
8963	World Trade Organization	World Trade Organization	Rue de Lausanne 154	500.553	120.010	46.224184°N 6.149673°E
2479	Palais de Justice (former hospital)	Palais de Justice (former hospital)	Place du Bourg-de-Four 1	500.510	117.400	46.200703°N 6.149671°E
2480	Palais de l’Athénée	Palais de l’Athénée	Rue de l’Athénée 2	500.366	117.172	46.198631°N 6.147854°E
2481	Palais des Nations Library and Archives of the SDN and ONU	Palais des Nations; Library and Archives of the SDN and ONU	Avenue de la Paix 14	499.843	120.288	46.226579°N 6.140412°E
2482; 8822	Palais Eynard et Archives de la ville de Genève	Palais Eynard et Archives de la ville de Genève	Rue de la Croix-Rouge 4	500.315	117.247	46.199298°N 6.147178°E
2483	Palais Wilson	Palais Wilson	Quai Wilson 51, 53	500.650	119.000	46.215114°N 6.151144°E
2484; 11746; 9605	Parc et campagne de la Grange and Library Neolithic Shore Settlement / Roman Villa	Parc et campagne de la Grange and Library; Neolithic Shore Settlement / Roman Villa		501.785	117.985	46.206151°N 6.166064°E
2470	Parc des Bastions avec Mur des Réformateurs	Parc des Bastions avec Mur des Réformateurs	Promenade des Bastions	500.220	117.350	46.20021°N 6.145925°E
2485	Place Neuve et Monument du Général Dufour	Place Neuve et Monument du Général Dufour	Place Neuve	500.035	117.467	46.201235°N 6.143504°E
9606	Plonjon Bronze Age Shore Settlement	Plonjon; Bronze Age Shore Settlement	station littorale de l’âge du bronze	501.695	118.600	46.21167°N 6.164768°E
2486	Pont de la Machine (Machine Bridge)	Pont de la Machine (Machine Bridge)	Rhône, Pont de la Machine 1	500.152	117.946	46.20556°N 6.144917°E
10502		Pont sur l’Arve (Arve Bridge) (shared with Veyrier)	Route de Vessy	501.250	115.210	46.181114°N 6.159719°E
2567	Poste du Mont-Blanc	Poste du Mont-Blanc	Rue du Mont-Blanc 18 / Rue Péccolat 1	500.174	118.288	46.20864°N 6.145129°E
2488	Quai du Mont-Blanc et mobilier urbain de 1896	Quai du Mont-Blanc et mobilier urbain de 1896	Quai du Mont-Blanc 8	500.647	118.380	46.209537°N 6.151237°E
2489	Quai et Hôtel des Bergues	Quai et Hôtel des Bergues	Quai des Bergues	500.296	118.109	46.207048°N 6.146748°E
2490	Quai Général Guisan and English Gardens	Quai Général Guisan and English Gardens		500.700	117.785	46.204193°N 6.15205°E
2491	Quai Gustave-Ador et mobilier urbain de 1896 avec Jet d’eau	Quai Gustave-Ador et mobilier urbain de 1896 avec Jet d’eau		501.034	117.913	46.205394°N 6.15635°E
8997	Salle communale de Plainpalais et théâtre Pitoëff	Salle communale de Plainpalais et théâtre Pitoëff	Rue de Carouge 50, 52	500.001	116.772	46.194979°N 6.143212°E
8970	Télévision Suisse Romande (TSR)	Télévision Suisse Romande (TSR)	D+A, Quai Ernest-Ansermet 20	499.437	116.944	46.196442°N 6.13587°E
2494	Temple de la Fusterie	Temple de la Fusterie	Place de la Fusterie 18	500.216	117.739	46.203708°N 6.14579°E
2495	Temple de la Madeleine, Archeological Site	Temple de la Madeleine, Archeological Site	Rue de la Madeleine 15	500.490	117.550	46.202049°N 6.14938°E
2496	Temple de l’Auditoire	Temple de l’Auditoire	Place de la Taconnerie 1	500.418	117.411	46.200788°N 6.148477°E
2497	Temple Saint-Gervais, Archeological Site	Temple Saint-Gervais, Archeological Site	Rue des Terreaux-du-Temple 12	499.850	118.040	46.206361°N 6.140985°E
8935	International Telecommunication Union	International Telecommunication Union	Place des Nations	499.564	119.782	46.221987°N 6.136905°E
2499	Université	Université	Rue de Candolle 5	500.100	117.224	46.199059°N 6.144398°E
2501	Victoria Hall	Victoria Hall	Rue du Général Dufour 14	499.850	117.500	46.201504°N 6.1411°E
10473; 8720	Villa Bartholoni et Museum d’Histoire et Sciences	Villa Bartholoni et Museum d’Histoire et Sciences	Rue de Lausanne 128	500.733	119.636	46.220847°N 6.152085°E
9604	Ville Celtic, Roman and Medieval Village	Ville; Celtic, Roman and Medieval Village		500.400	117.700	46.203385°N 6.148182°E
8942	World Alliance of Young Men’s Christian Association	World Alliance of Young Men’s Christian Association		501.801	117.226	46.199327°N 6.16643°E
Unknown		ISOS ville: Genève				

== Genthod ==
KGS No.^{?}	Picture	Name	Street Address	CH1903 X coordinate	CH1903 Y coordinate	Location
2579	Campagne Bonnet	Campagne Bonnet	Rue Du Village 18	501.238	124.433	46.264067°N 6.157614°E
2580	Campagne du Creux-de-Genthod	Campagne du Creux-de-Genthod	Route du Creux-de-Genthod 19	501.703	124.495	46.264693°N 6.163631°E
2581	Campagne du Grand-Malagny	Campagne du Grand-Malagny	Route de Malagny 48, 50	501.504	125.205	46.27105°N 6.1609°E
Unknown		ISOS village: Genthod				

== Hermance ==
KGS No.^{?}	Picture	Name	Street Address	CH1903 X coordinate	CH1903 Y coordinate	Location
Unknown		ISOS petite Village / bourg: Hermance				

== Jussy ==
KGS No.^{?}	Picture	Name	Street Address	CH1903 X coordinate	CH1903 Y coordinate	Location
2595	Crest Castle and out buildings	Crest Castle and out buildings	Route du Château-du-Crest 40–46	508.817	121.208	46.23613°N 6.256534°E
Unknown		ISOS village: Jussy				
Unknown		ISOS hameau: Sionnet				

== Le Grand-Saconnex ==
KGS No.^{?}	Picture	Name	Street Address	CH1903 X coordinate	CH1903 Y coordinate	Location
8827		World Council of Churches, Archives	Route Des Morillons 7	498.860	120.885	46.231802°N 6.127544°E
8962	UNESCO Centre de documentation	UNESCO Centre de documentation	Route des Morillons 15	499.158	120.864	46.231658°N 6.131411°E

== Meinier ==
KGS No.^{?}	Picture	Name	Street Address	CH1903 X coordinate	CH1903 Y coordinate	Location
2604	Ruins of Rouelbeau Castle	Ruins of Rouelbeau Castle		505.840	121.900	46.241944°N 6.217806°E
Unknown		ISOS hameau: Carre				

== Meyrin ==
KGS No.^{?}	Picture	Name	Street Address	CH1903 X coordinate	CH1903 Y coordinate	Location
10027	Mani House	Mani House	Avenue De Vaudagne 13	494.652	120.849	46.230833°N 6.073014°E
8831	CERN Archives	CERN Archives	Route de Meyrin 399	492.900	121.260	46.234253°N 6.050214°E

== Onex ==
KGS No.^{?}	Picture	Name	Street Address	CH1903 X coordinate	CH1903 Y coordinate	Location
Unknown	ISOS village: Onex	ISOS village: Onex		492.900	121.260	46.234253°N 6.050214°E

== Plan-les-Ouates ==
KGS No.^{?}	Picture	Name	Street Address	CH1903 X coordinate	CH1903 Y coordinate	Location
2609	Forte D’Arare House	Forte D’Arare House	Chemin De Plein-Vent 3	497.199	112.987	46.160514°N 6.107752°E
8896	Patek Philippe SA, Archives	Patek Philippe SA, Archives	Chemin du Pont-du-Centenaire 141	497.607	113.756	46.167492°N 6.112865°E
9157	Vacheron Constantin, Archives	Vacheron Constantin, Archives	Chemin du Tourbillon 10	496.637	113.607	46.166004°N 6.100341°E

== Pregny-Chambésy ==
KGS No.^{?}	Picture	Name	Street Address	CH1903 X coordinate	CH1903 Y coordinate	Location
2613	Campagne Du Reposoir	Campagne Du Reposoir	Avec L’Orangerie, Route De Lausanne 225	500.333	120.956	46.23266°N 6.14662°E
2614	Rothschild Castle and outbuildings	Rothschild Castle and outbuildings	Route de Prégny 30–34	499.963	121.252	46.235268°N 6.141761°E
8684	Museum of the Swiss abroad	Museum of the Swiss abroad	Chemin de l’Impératrice 18	499.956	120.937	46.232433°N 6.141738°E
9156	World Health Organization, Archives	World Health Organization, Archives	Avenue Appia 20	499.385	120.982	46.232753°N 6.134327°E
8453	Serres de Rothschild	Serres de Rothschild	Chemin Palud 10–14	499.675	121.349	46.236097°N 6.138007°E

== Russin ==
KGS No.^{?}	Picture	Name	Street Address	CH1903 X coordinate	CH1903 Y coordinate	Location
2618	Campagne De La Grand’Cour	Campagne De La Grand’Cour	Route Des Molards 12–20, 26	489.913	116.235	46.188576°N 6.012683°E

== Satigny ==
KGS No.^{?}	Picture	Name	Street Address	CH1903 X coordinate	CH1903 Y coordinate	Location
2621	Choully Castle and Farms	Choully Castle and Farms	Choully, Route du Crêt-de-Choully 30	491.300	120.045	46.223068°N 6.029759°E
2629	Domaine Pellegrin	Domaine Pellegrin	Peissy, Route de Peissy 46–50	490.647	118.758	46.211387°N 6.021598°E
Unknown		ISOS village: Bourdigny				
Unknown		ISOS village: Choully				
Unknown		ISOS village: Peissy				
Unknown		ISOS cas particulier: Satigny-Dessus				

== Soral ==
KGS No.^{?}	Picture	Name	Street Address	CH1903 X coordinate	CH1903 Y coordinate	Location
Unknown		ISOS village: Soral				

== Versoix ==
KGS No.^{?}	Picture	Name	Street Address	CH1903 X coordinate	CH1903 Y coordinate	Location
9607		Bourg; Bronze Age, Littoral Settlement		502.280	126.320	46.281192°N 6.170732°E
2642	Villa Bartholony (Sans Souci)	Villa Bartholony (Sans Souci)	Route de Lausanne 398	502.048	125.431	46.273162°N 6.167909°E

== Veyrier ==
KGS No.^{?}	Picture	Name	Street Address	CH1903 X coordinate	CH1903 Y coordinate	Location
2647	Pont Sur L’Arve (Shared with Genève)	Pont Sur L’Arve (Shared with Genève)	Route De Vessy	501.250	115.210	46.181114°N 6.159719°E
Unknown		ISOS village urbanisé: Veyrier				
Unknown		ISOS hameau: Sierne				

== See also ==
List of cultural property of regional significance in Switzerland: Geneva
