= Mallett House =

Mallett House or Mallet House or Mallette Cabin or variations may refer to:

== Places ==
=== England ===
- Mallet Court, the manor house of Curry Mallet, in Somerset

=== Switzerland ===
- Mallet House and Museum international de la Réforme, a cultural property in Geneva

=== United States ===
- George W. Mallett House, Princeton, Arkansas, listed on the National Register of Historic Places (NRHP) in Dallas County, Arkansas
- Mallett, David Jr. House, Trumbull, Connecticut, also known as The Mallett House, NRHP-listed, in Fairfield County
- Joseph Mallet House, Davenport, Iowa, listed on the NRHP in Scott County, Iowa
- Mallett Hall (Lee, Maine), listed on the NRHP in Penobscot County, Maine
- Mallett Hall (Pownal Center, Maine), listed on the NRHP in Cumberland County, Maine
- Orin Mallette Cabin, Red River, New Mexico, listed on the NRHP in Taos County, New Mexico
- Sylvester M. Mallette Cabin, Red River, New Mexico, listed on the NRHP in Taos County, New Mexico
- Mallet House (University of Virginia), a dorm at Brown College at Monroe Hill, in Virginia

== See also ==
- Mallett Hall (disambiguation)
- E.B. Mallett Office Building, Freeport, Maine, listed on the NRHP in Cumberland County, Maine
- Mallett (disambiguation)
