= House at 919 Oneida Street =

Historic house in Iowa, United States

- U.S. National Register of Historic Places
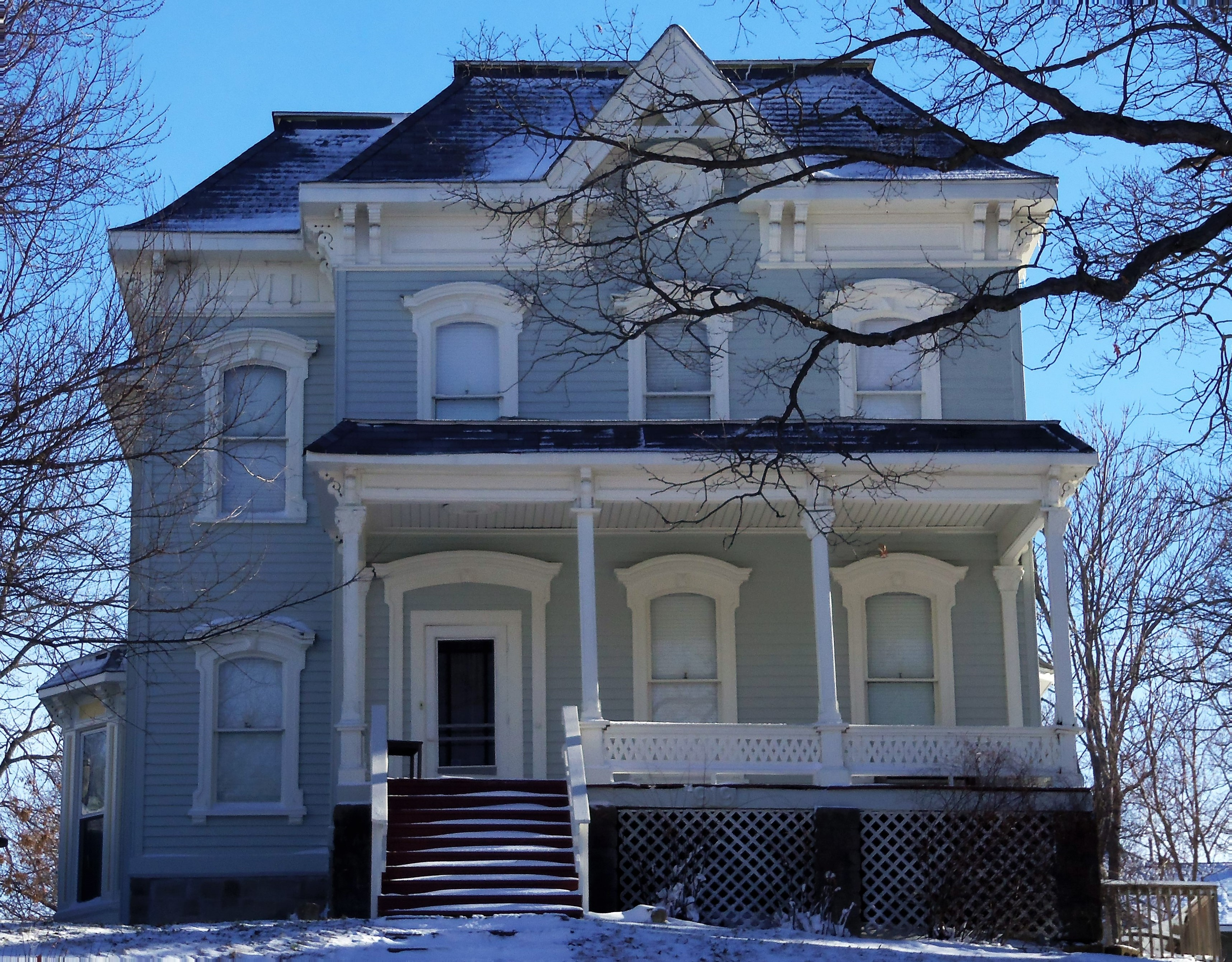

- Location within Iowa Location within the United States
- Location: 919 Oneida St. Davenport, Iowa
- Coordinates: 41°31′46″N 90°33′32″W
- Area: 1 acre (0.40 ha)
- Built: 1875
- Architectural style: Late Victorian
- MPS: Davenport MRA
- NRHP reference No.: 84001444
- Added to NRHP: April 5, 1984

The House at 919 Oneida Street is a historic building located on the east side of Davenport, Iowa, United States. It has been listed on the National Register of Historic Places since 1984.

== Architecture ==
This house shows the development of the Italianate form in Davenport from the Joseph Mallet House and the Joseph Motie House, both of which were built earlier. This particular house is a good example of the Vernacular-Italianate style that was popular in Davenport after the Civil War. It features projections from the box-like form, bracketed eaves, curved window hoods, and decorative elements cut by jig and scroll saws. The arched window surrounds, the front porch with the Corinthian order column caps, the bracketed cornice, and the unusual gable with decorative millwork apron and the bargeboards above the central oculus are all original to the house. Some of these elements are also found locally on Second Empire style houses. Its complex plan and roofscape, exemplified here by the full-height projecting window bays and gabled dormers toward the back of the structure, would be a feature of later Victorian architecture in Davenport.

== Local Lore ==
This house was originally built at the bottom of a hill but was later moved upward per the owner's wishes. This move required the house to be split in half. In order for the house to be moved, ice blocks were placed underneath each half and pulled by a horse.

The house is situated near the Mississippi River.
