= Mallett Hall =

Mallett Hall may refer to:

- Mallett Hall (Lee, Maine), listed on the National Register of Historic Places in Penobscot County, Maine
- Mallett Hall (Pownal Center, Maine), listed on the National Register of Historic Places in Cumberland County, Maine

== See also ==
- Mallett House (disambiguation)
- Mallett (disambiguation)
