= Motie =

Motie may refer to:

== Fictional species ==
- Furry biped of the CoDominium universe, introduced in the 1974 novel The Mote in God's Eye by Larry Niven and Jerry Pournelle

== Organisations ==
- MOTIE, the South Korean Ministry of Trade, Industry and Energy

== People ==
- Gudakesh Motie, Guyanese cricketer
- Joseph G Motie, bricklayer after whom an historic building in Iowa, United States, is named
- Tanya Motie, trustee of the charity Lumos
- Youssef El Motie, Moroccan footballer
