= Mallett (disambiguation) =

Mallett is a surname.

Mallett may also refer to:

- Mallett, South Australia, a former town
- Mallett Antiques, an antique dealer

== See also ==
- Mallett Hall (disambiguation)
- Mallett House (disambiguation)
