= Collonge-Bellerive =

- Municipality
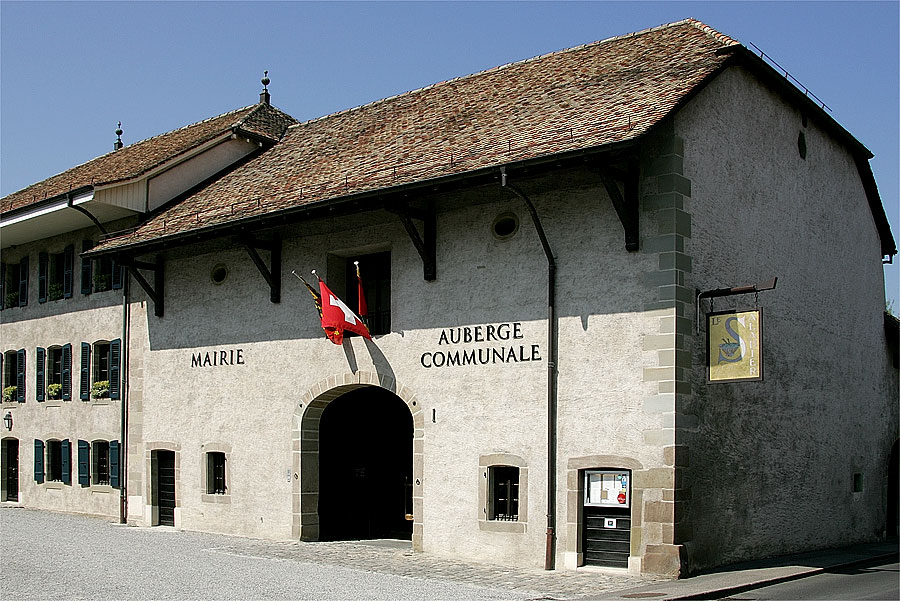

- Flag Coat of arms
- Location of Collonge-Bellerive
- Location within Switzerland Location within Canton of Geneva
- Coordinates: 46°15′N 06°12′E
- Country: Switzerland
- Canton: Geneva
- District: n.a.

Government
  - Mayor: Maire; Francine de Planta

Area
  - Total: 6.12 km^{2} (2.36 sq mi)
- Elevation: 426 m (1,398 ft)

Population (December 2020)
  - Total: 8,445
  - Density: 1,380/km^{2} (3,570/sq mi)
- Time zone: UTC+01:00 (CET)
  - Summer (DST): UTC+02:00 (CEST)
- Postal code: 1222
- SFOS number: 6616
- ISO 3166 code: CH-GE
- Surrounded by: Bellevue, Choulex, Cologny, Corsier, Meinier, Vandœuvres
- Website: www.collonge-bellerive.ch

Collonge-Bellerive (French pronunciation: [kɔlɔ̃ʒ bɛlʁiv]) is a municipality of the Canton of Geneva, Switzerland.

== History ==
Collonge-Bellerive is first mentioned in 1153 as Collonges. In 1275 Saint-Maurice is first mentioned as Sancto Mauricio and Vésenaz first in 1314 as Vysinaz. Until 1799 it was known as Collonge sur Bellerive. It became part of the Canton of Geneva in 1816.

== Geography ==
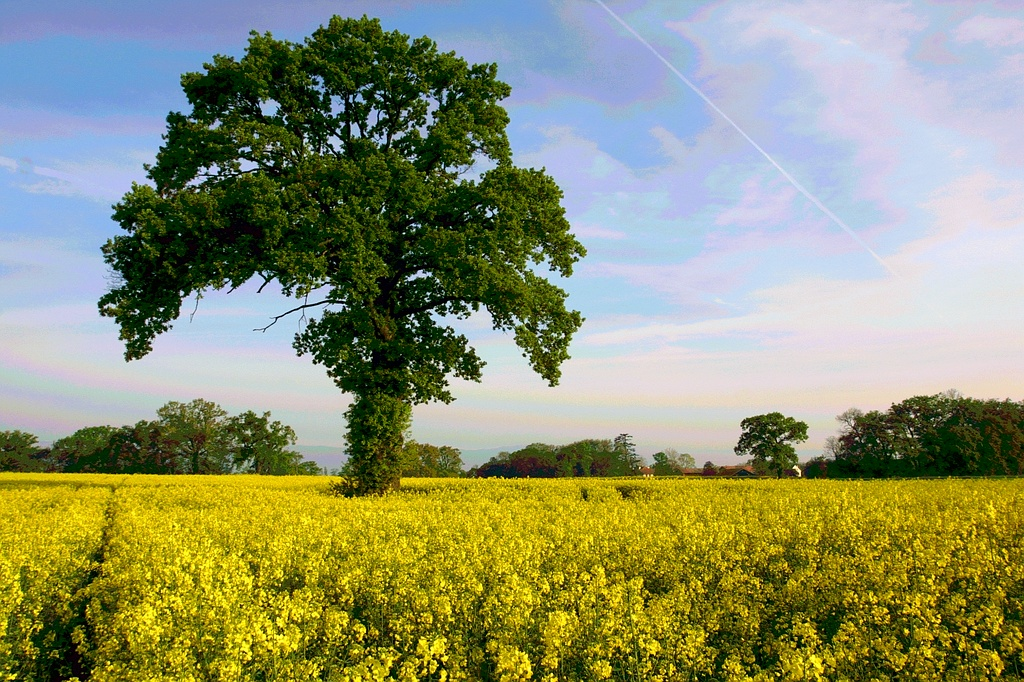
Tree and fields outside Collonge-Bellerive

Aerial view from 100 m by Walter Mittelholzer (1934)

Collonge-Bellerive has an area, as of 2009, of 6.12 square kilometers (2.36 sq mi). Of this area, 2.27 km^{2} (0.88 sq mi) or 37.1% is used for agricultural purposes, while 0.25 km^{2} (0.097 sq mi) or 4.1% is forested. Of the rest of the land, 3.58 km^{2} (1.38 sq mi) or 58.5% is settled (buildings or roads), 0.01 km^{2} (2.5 acres) or 0.2% is either rivers or lakes and 0.02 km^{2} (4.9 acres) or 0.3% is unproductive land.

Of the built up area, industrial buildings made up 1.3% of the total area while housing and buildings made up 45.9% and transportation infrastructure made up 7.7%. while parks, green belts and sports fields made up 2.8%. Out of the forested land, 2.5% of the total land area is heavily forested and 1.6% is covered with orchards or small clusters of trees. Of the agricultural land, 21.4% is used for growing crops and 2.0% is pastures, while 13.7% is used for orchards or vine crops. All the water in the municipality is in lakes.

It is situated on the left bank of Lake Geneva. Surrounded by the municipalities of Cologny, Vandœuvres, Choulex, Meinier, and Corsier, Collonge-Bellerive consists primarily of the villages of Collonge, Vésenaz and Saint-Maurice together with the hamlets of Cherre, Bellerive, La Repentance and La Capite.

The municipality of Collonge-Bellerive consists of the sub-sections or villages of Bellerive, Collonge, La Gabiule, Saint-Maurice, La Pallanterie, La Californie, Vésenaz – lac, Vésenaz – village and La Combe.

== Demographics ==
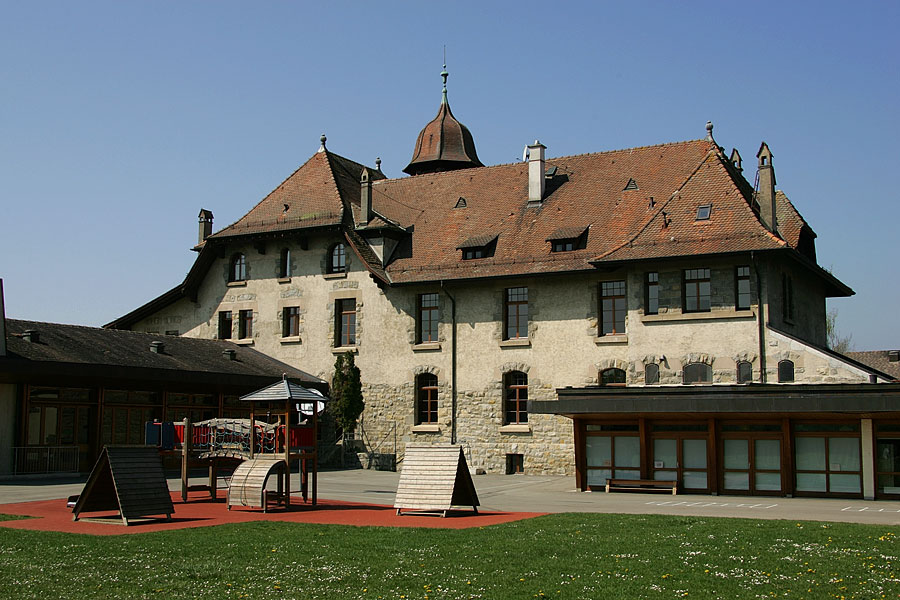
Primary School in Collonge

Collonge-Bellerive has a population (as of December 2020) of 8,445. As of 2008, 28.8% of the population are resident foreign nationals. Over the last 10 years (1999–2009) the population has changed at a rate of 23.9%. It has changed at a rate of 19% due to migration and at a rate of 4.4% due to births and deaths.

Most of the population (as of 2000) speaks French (5,010 or 79.0%), with English being second most common (431 or 6.8%) and German being third (296 or 4.7%). There are 2 people who speak Romansh.

As of 2008, the gender distribution of the population was 47.7% male and 52.3% female. The population was made up of 2,517 Swiss men (33.0% of the population) and 1,115 (14.6%) non-Swiss men. There were 2,876 Swiss women (37.8%) and 1,109 (14.6%) non-Swiss women. Of the population in the municipality 1,031 or about 16.3% were born in Collonge-Bellerive and lived there in 2000. There were 1,844 or 29.1% who were born in the same canton, while 908 or 14.3% were born somewhere else in Switzerland, and 2,249 or 35.5% were born outside of Switzerland.

In 2008 there were 40 live births to Swiss citizens and 29 births to non-Swiss citizens, and in same time span there were 30 deaths of Swiss citizens and 12 non-Swiss citizen deaths. Ignoring immigration and emigration, the population of Swiss citizens increased by 10 while the foreign population increased by 17. There were 5 Swiss men and 4 Swiss women who emigrated from Switzerland. At the same time, there were 27 non-Swiss men and 22 non-Swiss women who immigrated from another country to Switzerland. The total Swiss population change in 2008 (from all sources, including moves across municipal borders) was an increase of 70 and the non-Swiss population increased by 44 people. This represents a population growth rate of 1.5%.

The age distribution of the population (as of 2000) is children and teenagers (0–19 years old) make up 26.8% of the population, while adults (20–64 years old) make up 58.7% and seniors (over 64 years old) make up 14.6%.

As of 2000, there were 2,603 people who were single and never married in the municipality. There were 3,158 married individuals, 278 widows or widowers and 305 individuals who are divorced.

As of 2000, there were 2,247 private households in the municipality, and an average of 2.7 persons per household. There were 523 households that consist of only one person and 213 households with five or more people. Out of a total of 2,323 households that answered this question, 22.5% were households made up of just one person and there were 15 adults who lived with their parents. Of the rest of the households, there are 593 married couples without children, 922 married couples with children There were 158 single parents with a child or children. There were 36 households that were made up of unrelated people and 76 households that were made up of some sort of institution or another collective housing.

In 2000 there were 1,364 single family homes (or 78.3% of the total) out of a total of 1,743 inhabited buildings. There were 187 multi-family buildings (10.7%), along with 138 multi-purpose buildings that were mostly used for housing (7.9%) and 54 other use buildings (commercial or industrial) that also had some housing (3.1%). Of the single family homes 130 were built before 1919, while 253 were built between 1990 and 2000. The greatest number of single family homes (282) were built between 1971 and 1980.

In 2000 there were 2,455 apartments in the municipality. The most common apartment size was 4 rooms of which there were 491. There were 114 single room apartments and 1,259 apartments with five or more rooms. Of these apartments, a total of 2,123 apartments (86.5% of the total) were permanently occupied, while 259 apartments (10.5%) were seasonally occupied and 73 apartments (3.0%) were empty. As of 2009, the construction rate of new housing units was 5.3 new units per 1000 residents. The vacancy rate for the municipality, in 2010, was 0.3%.

The historical population is given in the following chart:

== Heritage sites of national significance ==
It is home to one or more prehistoric pile-dwelling (or stilt house) settlements that are part of the Prehistoric Pile dwellings around the Alps UNESCO World Heritage Site. The Bellerive I (a Bronze Age, littoral archeological site), the Bellerive Castle and Villa-chalet du Prince Essling are listed as Swiss heritage site of national significance.

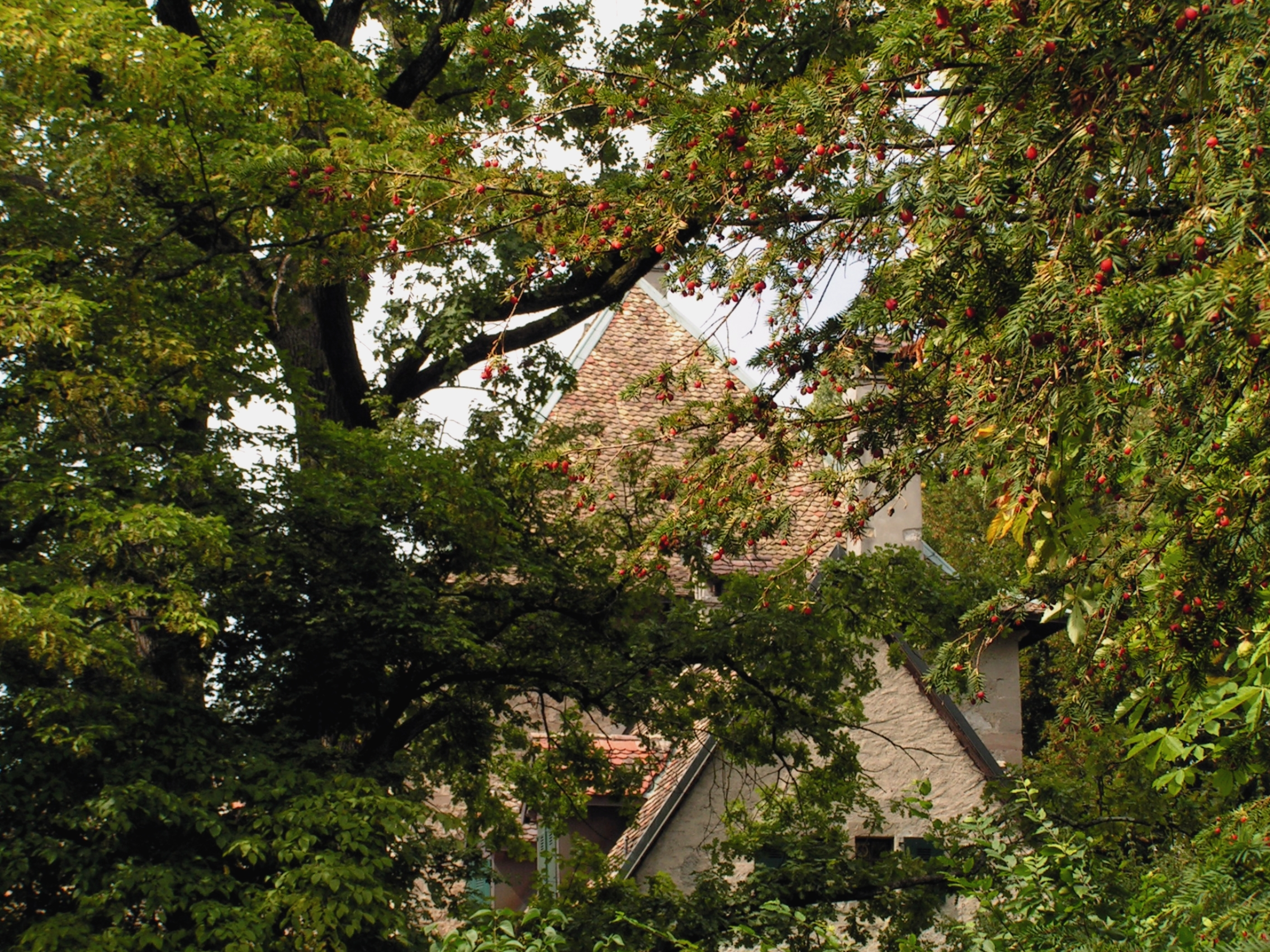
Bellerive Castle roof

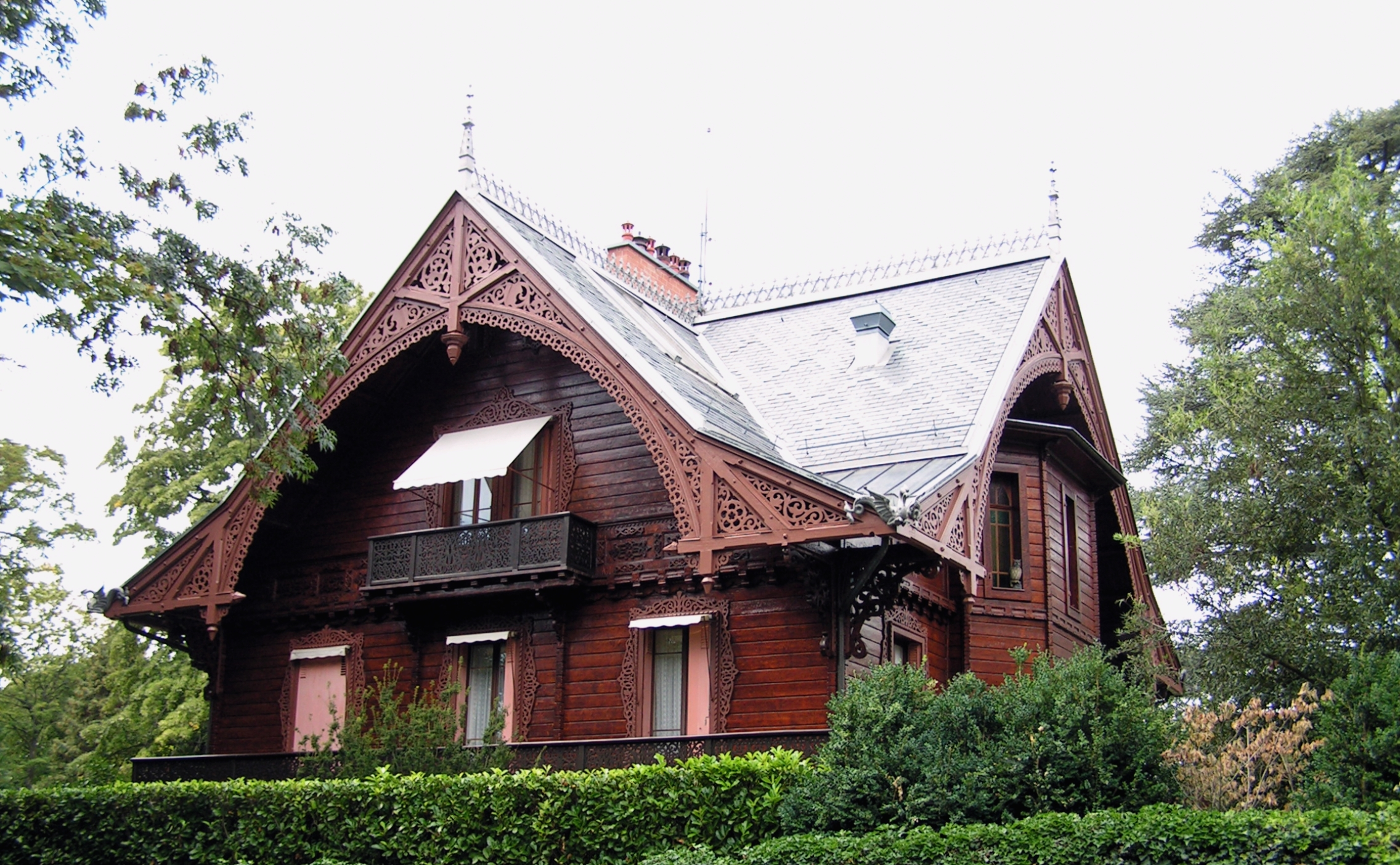
Villa-chalet du Prince Essling

== Politics ==
In the 2007 federal election the most popular party was the LPS Party which received 30.08% of the vote. The next three most popular parties were the SVP (22.39%), the CVP (14.55%) and the Green Party (10.15%). In the federal election, a total of 2,153 votes were cast, and the voter turnout was 55.2%.

In the 2009 Grand Conseil election, there were a total of 4,053 registered voters of which 2,012 (49.6%) voted. The most popular party in the municipality for this election was the Libéral with 32.7% of the ballots. In the canton-wide election they received the highest proportion of votes. The second most popular party was the PDC (with 14.9%), they were fifth in the canton-wide election, while the third most popular party was the Les Radicaux (with 10.7%), they were sixth in the canton-wide election.

For the 2009 Conseil d'Etat election, there were a total of 4,049 registered voters of which 2,286 (56.5%) voted.

In 2011, all the municipalities held local elections, and in Collonge-Bellerive there were 21 spots open on the municipal council. There were a total of 5,006 registered voters of which 2,250 (44.9%) voted. Out of the 2,250 votes, there were 36 blank votes, 17 null or unreadable votes and 212 votes with a name that was not on the list.

== Economy ==
As of 2010, Collonge-Bellerive had an unemployment rate of 3.8%. As of 2008, there were 53 people employed in the primary economic sector and about 15 businesses involved in this sector. 634 people were employed in the secondary sector and there were 58 businesses in this sector. 2,669 people were employed in the tertiary sector, with 267 businesses in this sector. There were 2,805 residents of the municipality who were employed in some capacity, of which females made up 41.0% of the workforce.

In 2008 the total number of full-time equivalent jobs was 2,846. The number of jobs in the primary sector was 46, of which 44 were in agriculture and 2 were in fishing or fisheries. The number of jobs in the secondary sector was 603 of which 362 or (60.0%) were in manufacturing and 241 (40.0%) were in construction. The number of jobs in the tertiary sector was 2,197. In the tertiary sector; 428 or 19.5% were in wholesale or retail sales or the repair of motor vehicles, 46 or 2.1% were in the movement and storage of goods, 107 or 4.9% were in a hotel or restaurant, 515 or 23.4% were in the information industry, 31 or 1.4% were the insurance or financial industry, 166 or 7.6% were technical professionals or scientists, 162 or 7.4% were in education and 476 or 21.7% were in health care.

In 2000, there were 1,973 workers who commuted into the municipality and 2,242 workers who commuted away. The municipality is a net exporter of workers, with about 1.1 workers leaving the municipality for every one entering. About 17.6% of the workforce coming into Collonge-Bellerive are coming from outside Switzerland, while 0.3% of the locals commute out of Switzerland for work. Of the working population, 16.5% used public transportation to get to work, and 63.5% used a private car.

== Religion ==
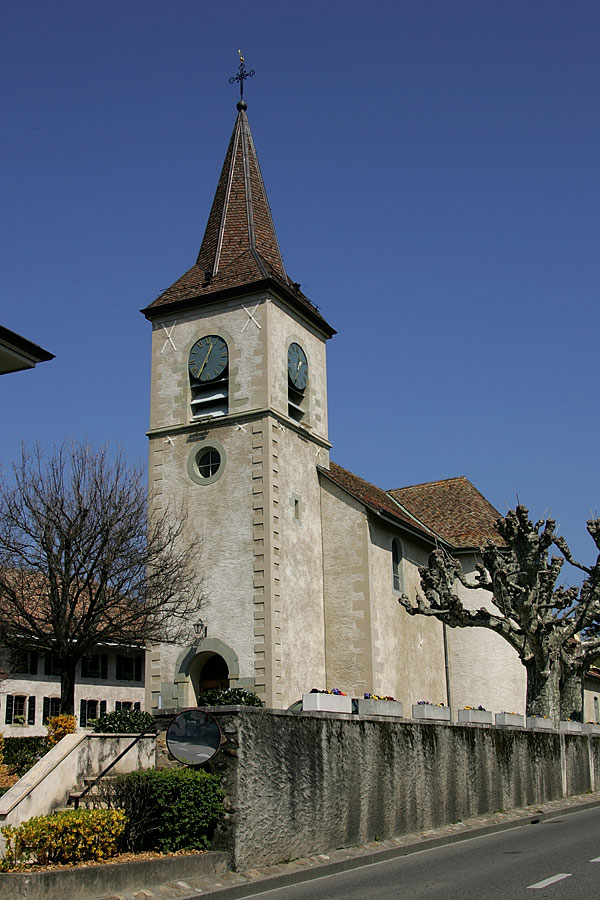
Church in Collonge

From the 2000 census, 2,499 or 39.4% were Roman Catholic, while 1,457 or 23.0% belonged to the Swiss Reformed Church. Of the rest of the population, there were 159 members of an Orthodox church (or about 2.51% of the population), there were 8 individuals (or about 0.13% of the population) who belonged to the Christian Catholic Church, and there were 89 individuals (or about 1.40% of the population) who belonged to another Christian church. There were 93 individuals (or about 1.47% of the population) who were Jewish, and 107 (or about 1.69% of the population) who were Muslim. There were 21 individuals who were Buddhist, 14 individuals who were Hindu and 12 individuals who belonged to another church. 1,318 (or about 20.78% of the population) belonged to no church, are agnostic or atheist, and 567 individuals (or about 8.94% of the population) did not answer the question.

== Education ==
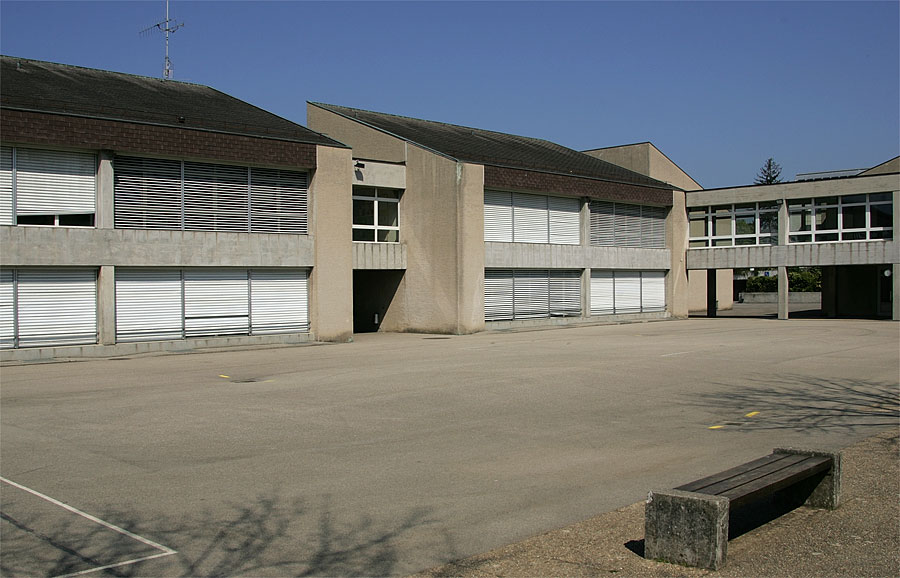
Upper school in Collonge

In Collonge-Bellerive about 1,574 or (24.8%) of the population have completed non-mandatory upper secondary education, and 1,920 or (30.3%) have completed additional higher education (either university or a Fachhochschule). Of the 1,920 who completed tertiary schooling, 40.6% were Swiss men, 31.9% were Swiss women, 16.1% were non-Swiss men and 11.4% were non-Swiss women.

During the 2009–2010 school year there were a total of 1,851 students in the Collonge-Bellerive school system. The education system in the Canton of Geneva allows young children to attend two years of non-obligatory Kindergarten. During that school year, there were 119 children who were in a pre-kindergarten class. The canton's school system provides two years of non-mandatory kindergarten and requires students to attend six years of primary school, with some of the children attending smaller, specialized classes. In Collonge-Bellerive there were 215 students in kindergarten or primary school and 22 students were in the special, smaller classes. The secondary school program consists of three lower, obligatory years of schooling, followed by three to five years of optional, advanced schools. There were 215 lower secondary students who attended school in Collonge-Bellerive. There were 362 upper secondary students from the municipality along with 45 students who were in a professional, non-university track program. An additional 540 students attended a private school.

As of 2000, there were 506 students in Collonge-Bellerive who came from another municipality, while 692 residents attended schools outside the municipality.
