= Russian Church, Geneva =

Russian Orthodox church in Geneva, Switzerland

Coordinates: 46.198882°N 6.153785°E

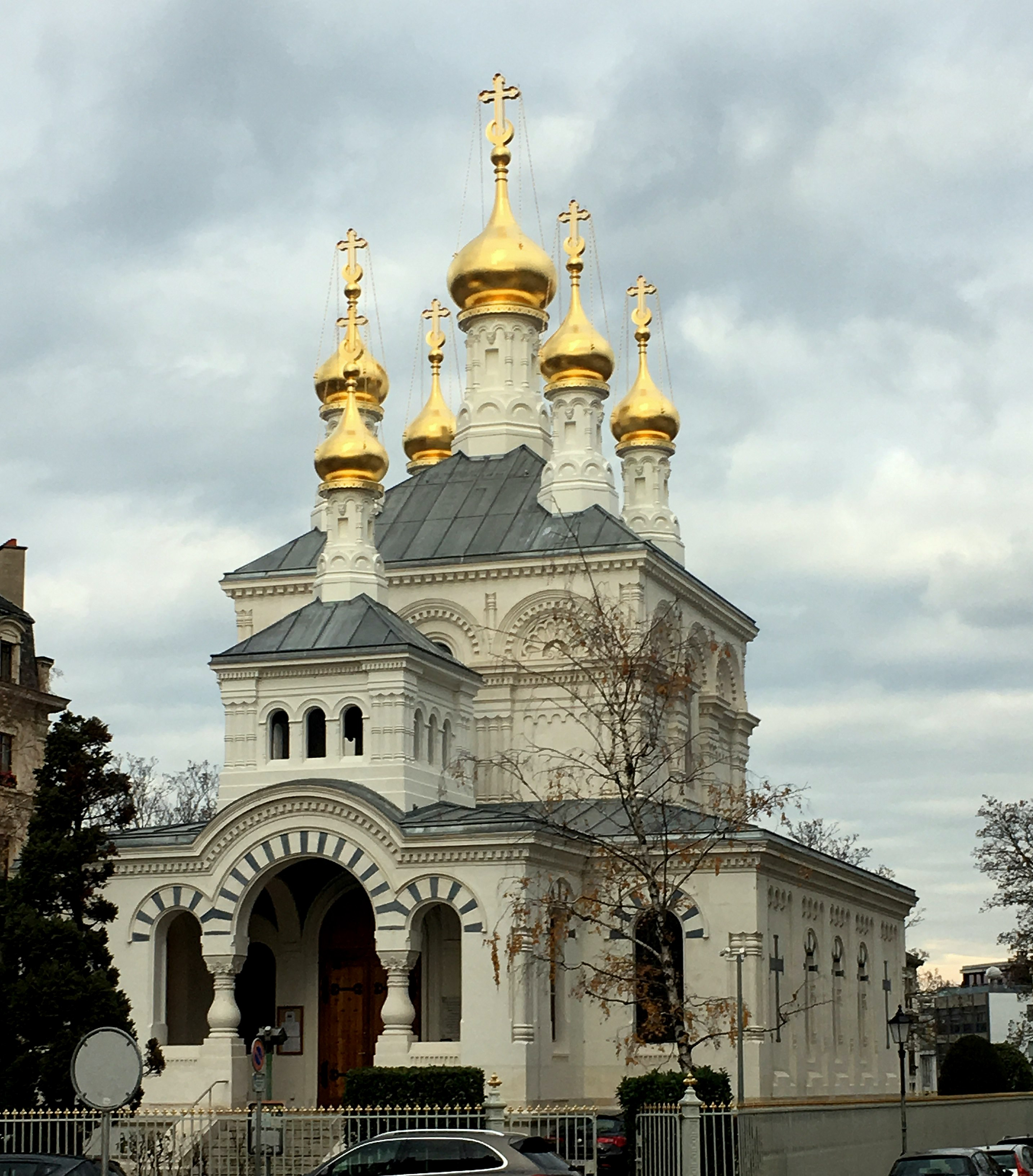

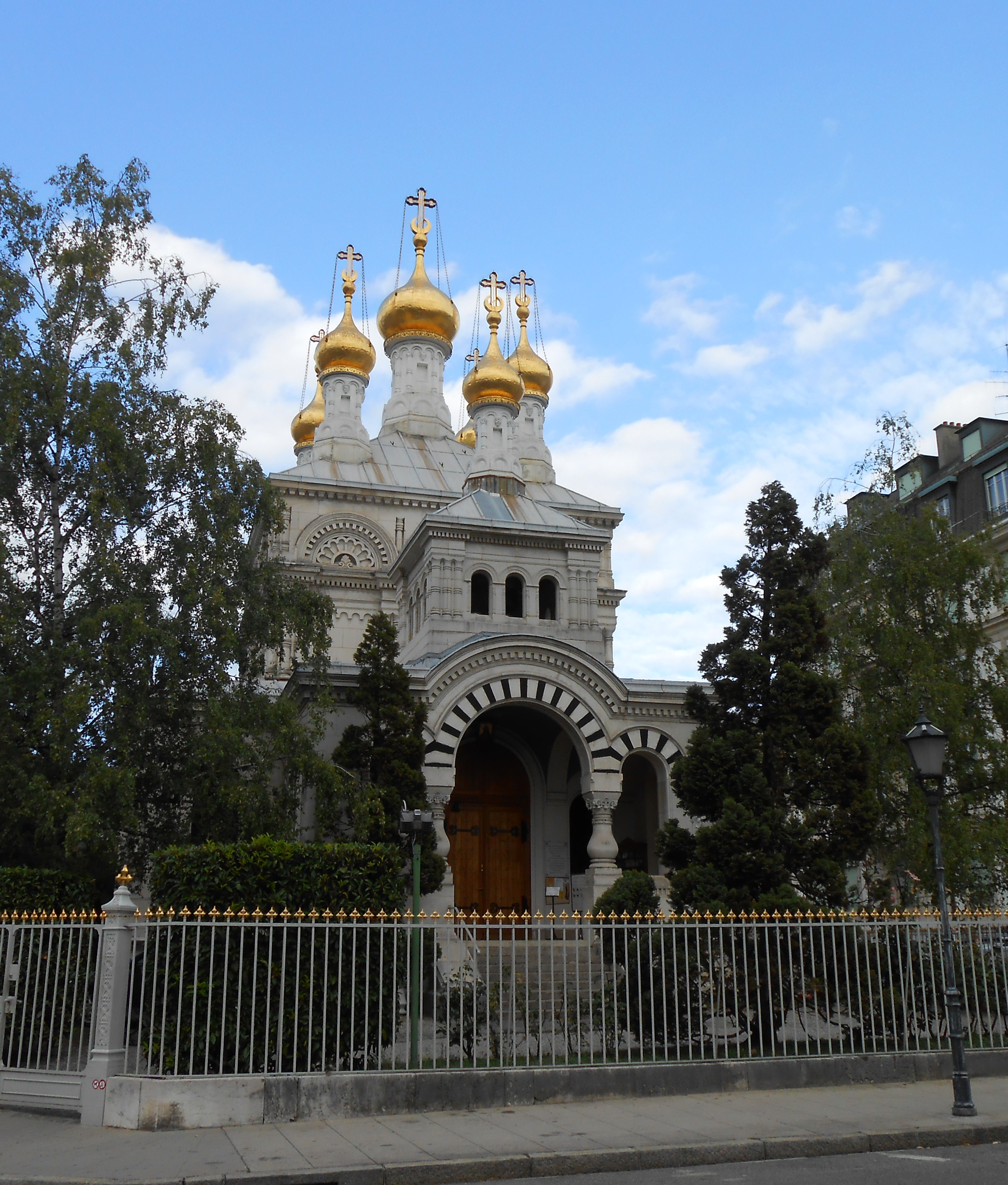

The Russian Church, Geneva (French: Cathédrale de l'Exaltation de la Sainte Croix, Cathedral of the Exaltation of the Holy Cross) is a historic Russian Orthodox church in Geneva, Switzerland.

It was designed by David Grimm of the Imperial Academy of Arts and completed in 1866 in the fashionable Les Tranchées neighborhood of Geneva. The Russian revival church, with its Byzantine striped arches and gold onion domes, underwent restoration in 1966. The church remains in active use under the authority of the Russian Orthodox Church Outside of Russia.

== See also ==
- Plainpalais
