= Satigny =

- Municipality
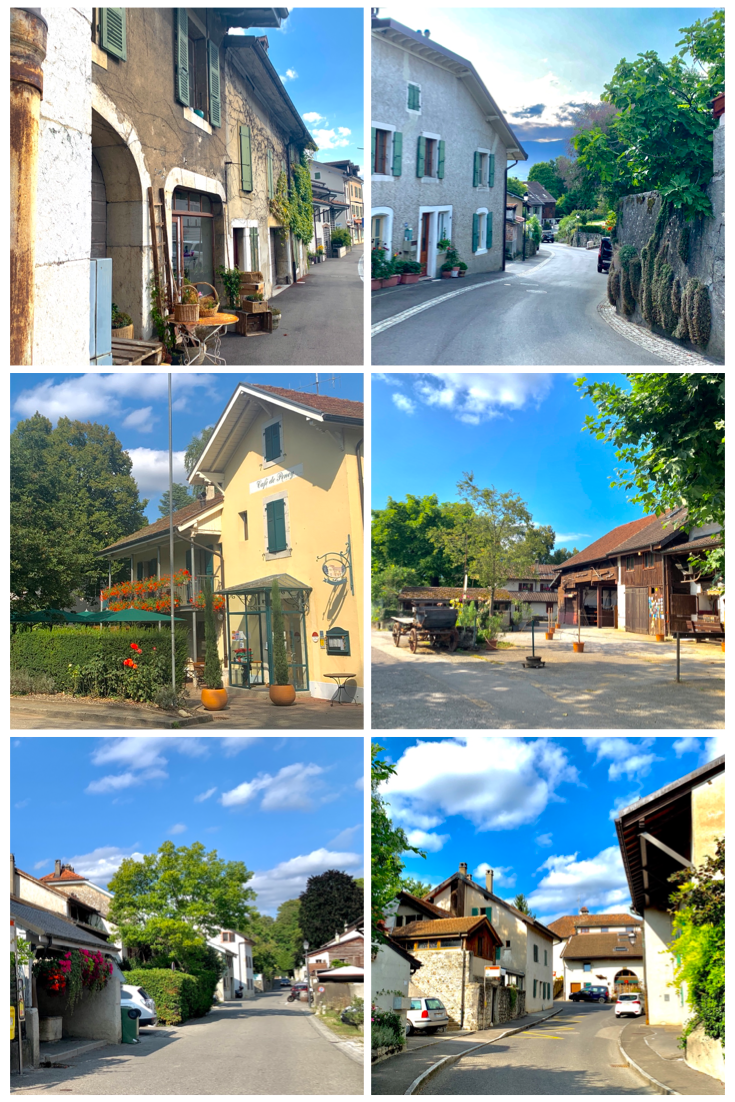

- Flag Coat of arms
- Location of Satigny
- Location within Switzerland Location within Canton of Geneva
- Coordinates: 46°13′N 06°02′E
- Country: Switzerland
- Canton: Geneva
- District: n.a.

Government
  - Mayor: Maire; Anne Revaclier

Area
  - Total: 18.92 km^{2} (7.31 sq mi)
- Elevation: 505 m (1,657 ft)

Population (December 2020)
  - Total: 4,286
  - Density: 226.5/km^{2} (586.7/sq mi)
- Time zone: UTC+01:00 (CET)
  - Summer (DST): UTC+02:00 (CEST)
- Postal code: 1242
- SFOS number: 6638
- ISO 3166 code: CH-GE
- Surrounded by: Aire-la-Ville, Bernex, Dardagny, Meyrin, Prévessin-Moëns (FR-01), Russin, Saint-Genis-Pouilly (FR-01), Thoiry (FR-01), Vernier
- Website: www.satigny.ch

Satigny (French pronunciation: [satiɲi]) is a municipality of the Canton of Geneva, Switzerland. It is the largest municipality of the canton by land area and the largest wine-producing municipality of the country. Its territory contains the majority of the Mandement area, a designated heritage site of national importance shared with the neighbouring municipalities of Russin and Dardagny.

== Etymology ==
Satigny is first mentioned in 91 as villam Satiniatis, though this comes from a 12th Century copy of the earlier document. In around 1128 it was mentioned as de Satiniaco and in 1280 as Satignie. The name very likely origins in Gallo-Roman in reference of local Roman owners.

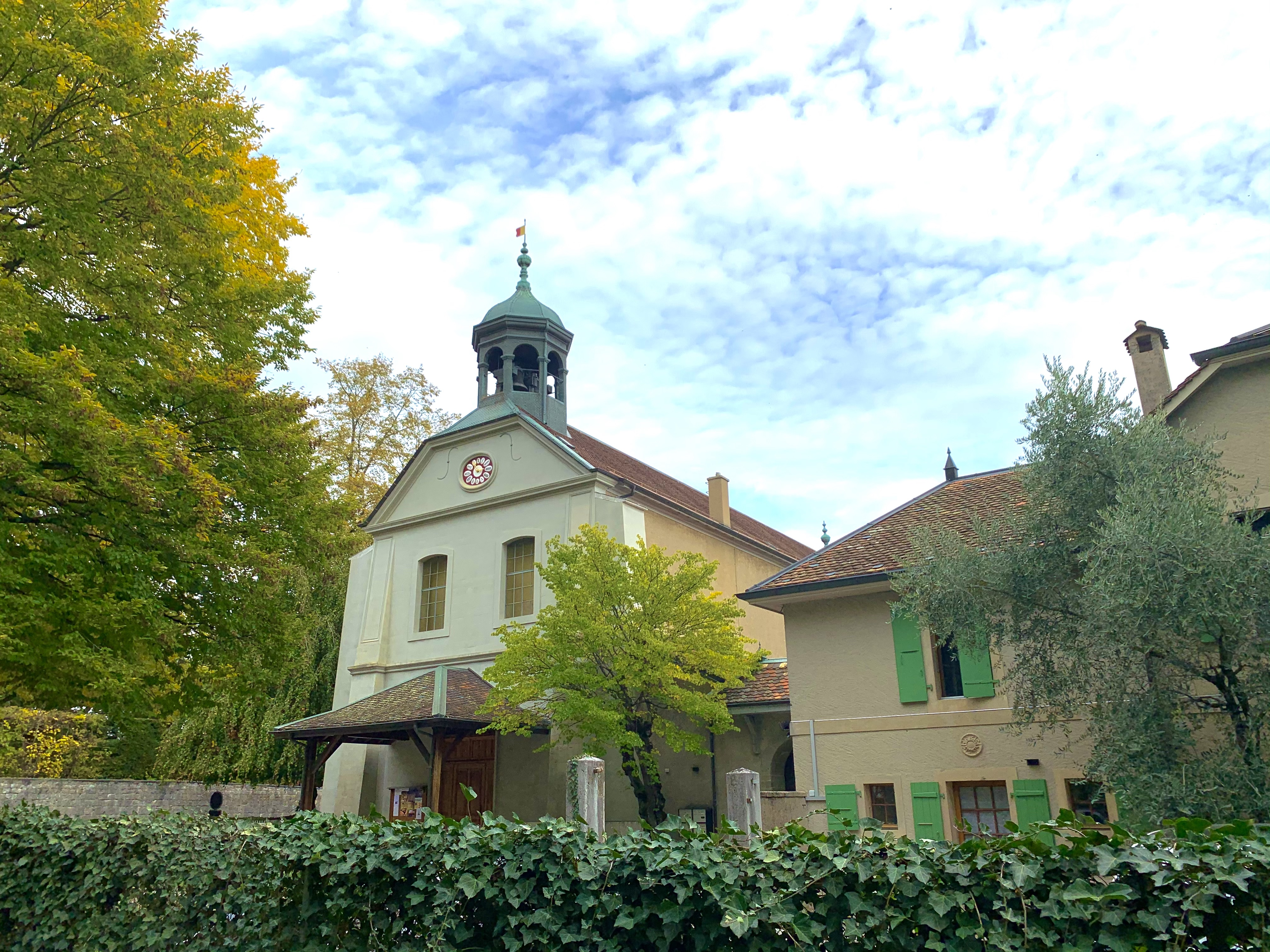
The old catholic church of Saint-Pierre-aux-Liens, which became protestant after the reformation. The current church was rebuilt in 1716.

The etymology of Peney on the other hand is different and subject to different interpretations. The first one is that it could come from the Latin "pinetum", which stands for "forest of pine trees", but it could also come from the Celtic roots of "pen" (extremity) and "nec" (height).

Bourdigny's name, for its part, also has a different origin, from the German-language Burgundians and the root is a surname such as "Bürdin", which later became "Burdignus" with the romanisation of region.

Finally, Montfleury's name is more anecdotal. This old grouping of houses without a particular denomination was first called "The Shacks". It was only in 1829 that, to oblige to the demand of its inhabitants, the hamlet changed its official name to "Montfleury".

== Coat of arms and flag ==
Gules with a silver double-bladed key, alongside a sun to and a golden crescent.

The coat of arms and the flag were adopted by the municipality on 8 September 1924 and approved by the cantonal executive government on 26 September 1924. The municipality of Satigny, which corresponds to the old Mandement de Peney (see history), was owned by the bishop, and since 1536 by the Republic of Geneva, and it was the prime example of old Genevan countryside.

The coat of arms and the flag are derived from the seal of the prior of Satigny from 1340: this seal represents a hand holding a double-bladed key with a sun and a golden crescent. Satigny removed the hand, and gave to the shield the cantonal and federal colours: red shield and white key for the colours of the Swiss Confederation, and the red shield and golden sun and crescent for the colours of the Republic and Canton of Geneva.

== History ==
In its origins, Satigny fell under the jurisdiction of Saint-Pierre-aux-Liens, a dependency of the abbot of Ainay in Lyon, which grew rapidly with lands granted to it mainly by the lords of Gex.

Aerial view (1964)

When the territory of the municipality formed part of the Peney castellany, the town had a priory devoted to St Peter. A chart from 912, the oldest surviving authentic document of Geneva's history, notifies the donation by Eldegarde, probably a countess, of part of the assets inherited from her husband to the monastery of St Peter. However, she reserved for herself the usufruct of the lands located in Satigny, Choully, Peissy, Challex, Crest, Logras, and Feigères, and she asked the bishop of Geneva to ensure that her donation was well executed.

In 1134 the bishop denounced the violation of the canonical rules and obtained by arbitrage from the archbishop of Vienna the priory of Satigny. The main town would develop around the convent and, in 1305, its inhabitants and those of the neighbouring hamlets created a community. The castle of Peney-Dessus, flanked by a fortified village, was the headquarters of the Peney castellany, also called land of Mortier.

In 1282, a monk of Satigny, in love with Léonette de Joinville, slipped disguised as a woman into the apartment of the wife of the lord of Gex. When she discovered him, she made him undress and be beaten by her people. Simon de Joinville turned this into a pretext to claim the rights of the Peney castellany, its castle, Saint-Gervais, and the bridge over the Rhône river. The bishop responded by reminding to Simon that he had forgot to pay his tribute and he requested a compensation. In the face of the growing power of the bishop, the lord of Gex renounced to his claims and he submitted to the demands of the bishop.

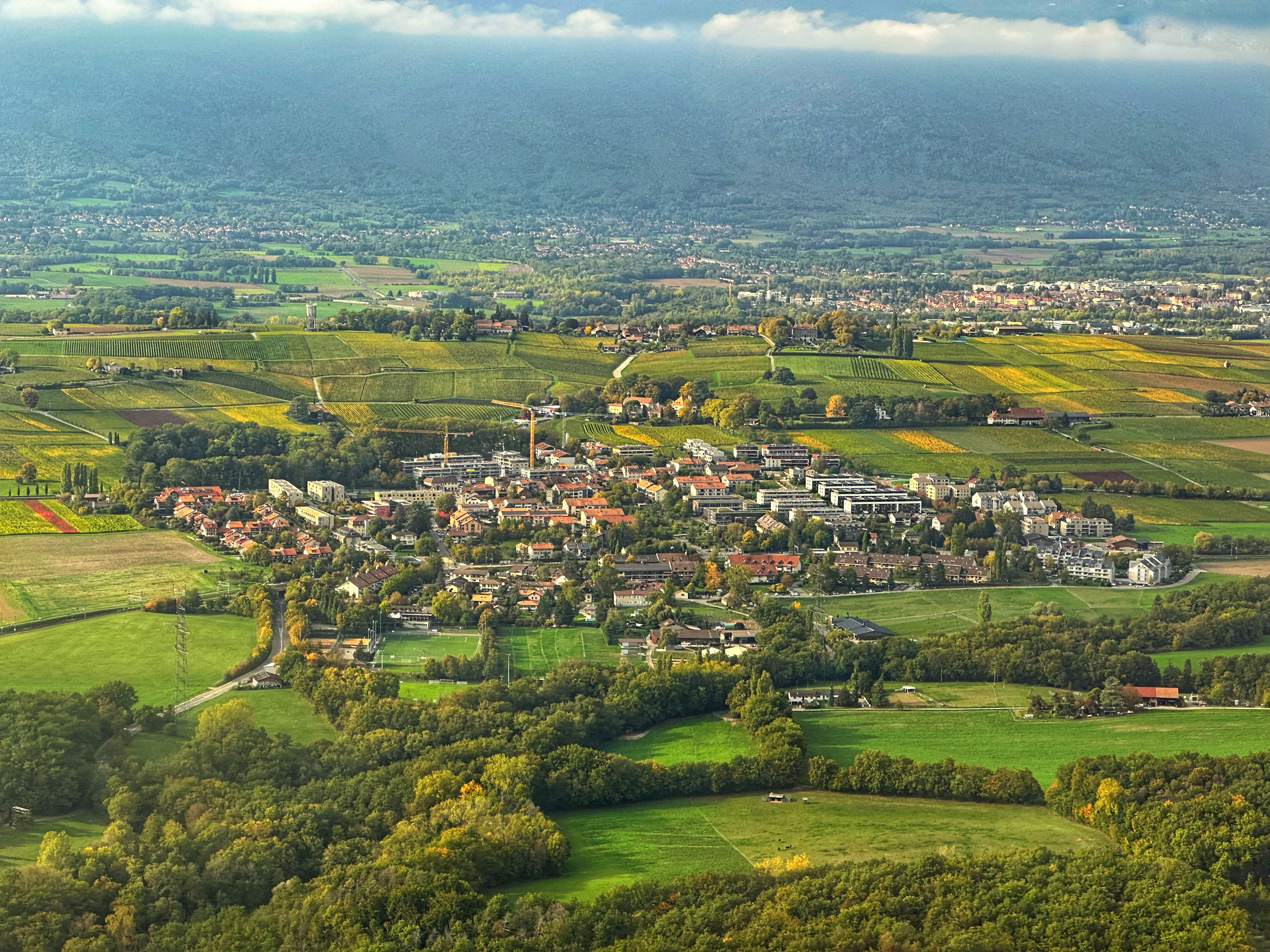
View over the main town of Satigny, surrounded by its vineyards. In the foreground, the forest of Merdisel. In the background, the Jura mountain chain covered by clouds

Built, or-rebuilt around 1230 by the bishop Aymon of Grandson, the castle of Peney was besieged and conquered in 1287 by Amadeus V, Count of Savoy. Recovered in 1305 by the bishop, the castle fell again between 1349 and 1355 to the hands of the count of Geneva. In the 14th century, the loosening of the morals at the priory led the bishop to intervene and to begin to directly administer the convent by his chapter. Its revenues contributed to the upkeep of the cathedral to the detriment of the monastery. The monks became economical by necessity and, in 1381, a papal bull from Clement VII merged the priory of Satigny with the Geneva chapter.

In 1512, in the face of the extreme poverty of the monks (they even lacked priestly robes), the Pope Julius II transformed the priory into a parish. In 1534, Geneva was shaken by the fights of the Reformation. The partisans of Catholicism fled the city and took refuge in the castle of Peney, from which they launched attacks against the Republic, pillaging and robbing the region. They are called the “Peneysans”. The Bernese troops took over the castle on 5 February 1536 and finally demolished it.

The town of Bourdigny, which belonged to the lords of Gex, joined the municipality in 1749 with the treaty of Paris. After the reformation, the region of the Mandement, comprising Peissy, Satigny, Choully, Peney, Bourdigny, and Dardagny, would remain territories administered by the secular authorities of the Republic of Geneva, cut-off from the city by French territory. The lands would finally geographically linked to Geneva with the Congress of Vienna in 1815 and with the Treaty of Turin in 1816, which granted several towns to the new canton from France and Savoy in order to create geographical continuity, amongst which the towns Aire-la-Ville, Meyrin, Vernier, and Bernex, that now border Satigny. Peney and its castle used to belong to the municipality of Russin and they only joined Satigny in 1817.

== Geography ==
According to the Swiss federal statistics office, Satigny measures 18,92 km^{2}, which makes it the largest municipality of the canton of Geneva by geographical size.

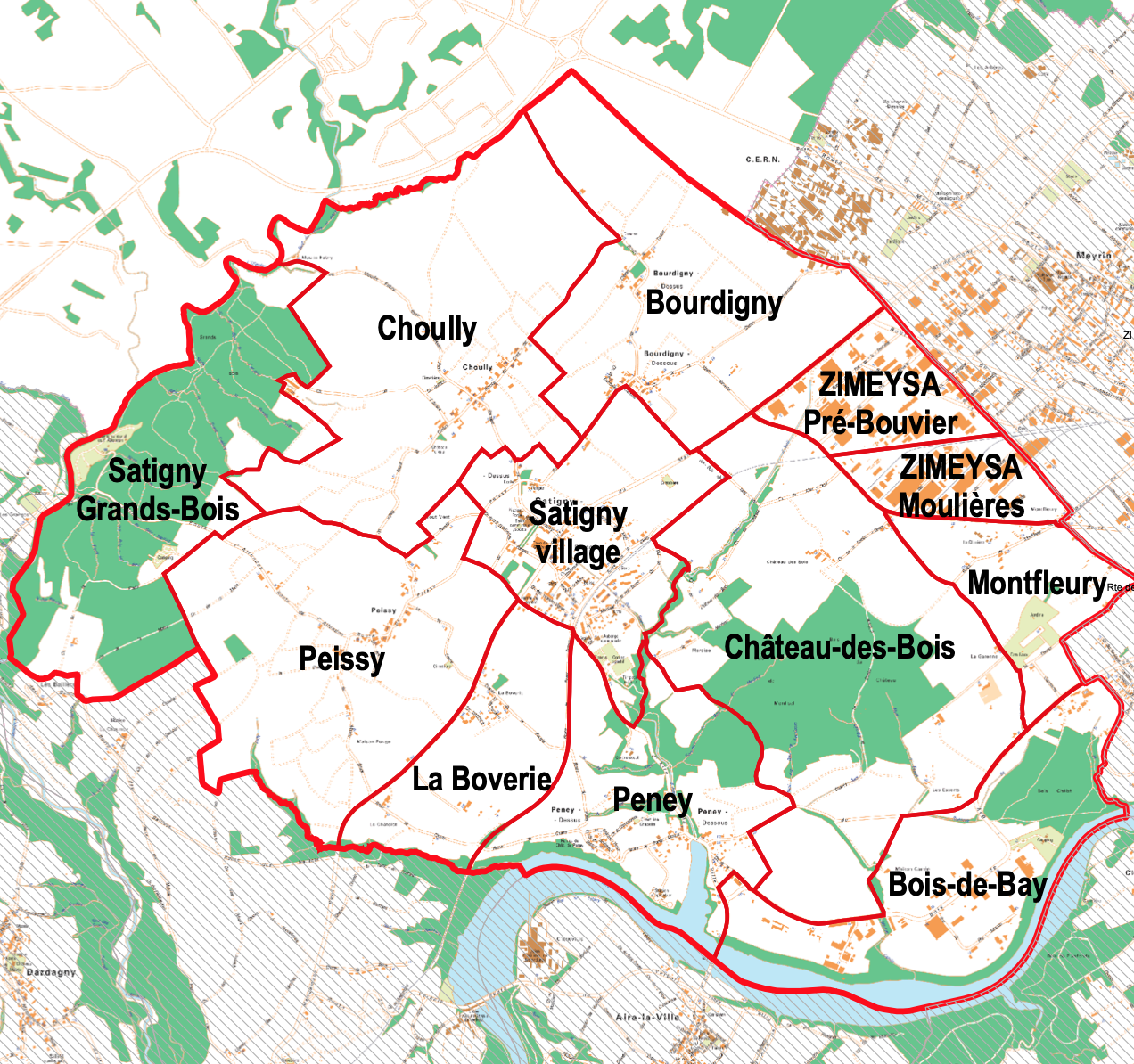
The subdivisions of the municipality of satigny

Due to its considerable geographical size, the municipality includes many subdivisions: the neighbourhoods of Satigny-Dessous, Satigny-Dessus, as well as the hamlets of Bourdigny, Peney (Dessous and Dessus), Choully, Montfleury, and Peissy. It also includes the large industrial areas of ZIMEYSA and Bois-de-Bay. It forms part of the Mandement (an old term for castellany, referring to the castellany of Peney), and it borders the Swiss municipalities of Meyrin and Vernier to the East; Bernex, and Aire-la-Ville, to its south, separated from Satigny by the Rhône river; Russin, and Dardagny to the west. France is located to the north-west of the municipality, separated from Satigny by the Allondon river and the stream of the Nant de l'Ecra.

The municipality is bordered by the CERN to its north-east, which together with the ZIMEYSA industrial area at the east of the municipality marks the transition from countryside to the urban landscape formed by Meyrin and Vernier which surround the city of Geneva.

The Jura Mountains define the outline of the landscape in the background. The Salève, the Lake Geneva, as well as the French Alps are also visible in the distance to the east and south-east of the town.

Satigny, like other towns in the periphery of Geneva, plays as role as a "green belt" and incarnates the bucolic image of vineyard-dominated countryside-landscape for the local urban inhabitants, mixing large wooded areas, hilly landscapes, and vineyards. Indeed, with 460 hectares of vineyards, Satigny concentrates one-third of the 1,410 hectares of vineyards in the canton of Geneva, which makes it not only Geneva's largest wine-making town but also Switzerland's.

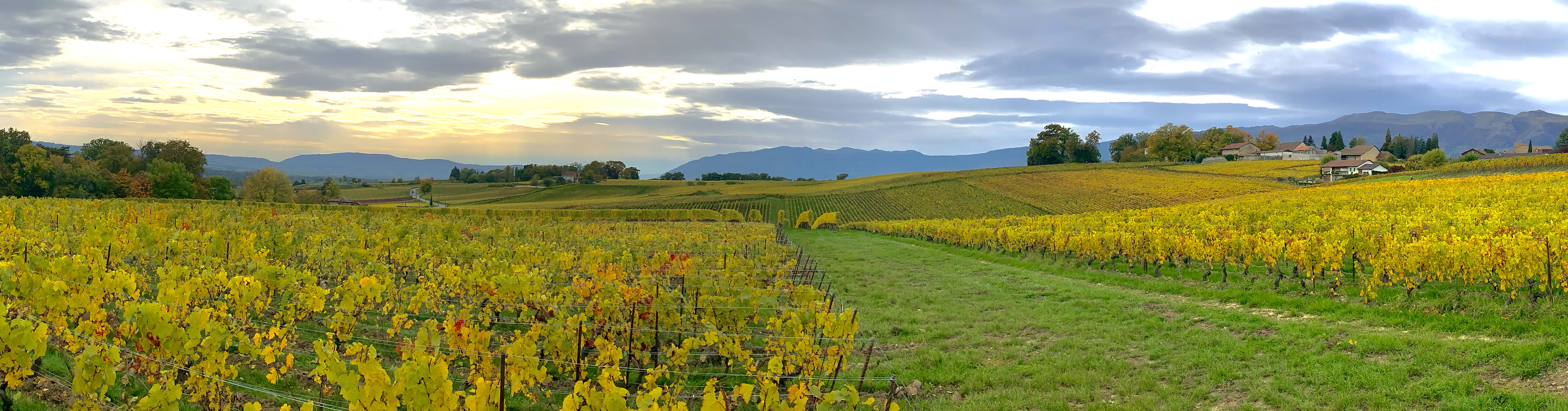
The typical landscape of Satigny, with the Jura mountains in the background

Although some pedestrian crossings still exist on the route of Bourdigny and Moulin Fabry, after the closure of the small custom offices in 1993, the Franco-Swiss border is not crossed by any road in Satigny. This, coupled with the border created by the Allondon, and the 4-lane D-884 road on the French side, has separated the town from the French territory and there are very few relations between both sides.

== Demographics ==
Satigny has a population (as of December 2020) of 4,286.. Most of the population (as of 2000) speaks French (2,208 or 79.3%), with German being second most common (137 or 4.9%) and English being third (125 or 4.5%). There are 62 people who speak Italian and 2 people who speak Romansh.

The historical population is given in the following chart:

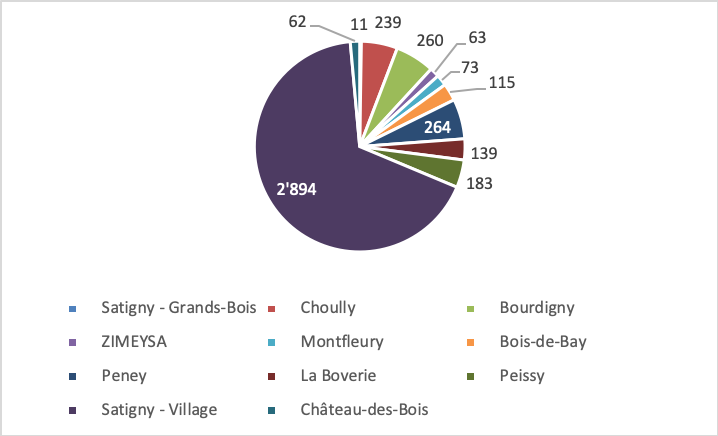
The population of Satigny by sub-sector and hamlets in June 2020

The development of Satigny was very stable until the 1950s. During the 60s-80s, there was some light growth, driven mainly by the construction of houses in the neighbourhood of Pré-Gentil. But the major development of the town occurred from the 90s onwards. Of all the buildings, 25% were built before 1919, 30% from 1919 to 1980, and the remaining 47% after 1980.

The size of the housing is on the average for the rural towns (113 sqm), but a lot larger than in neighbouring urban Meyrin (80 sqm) and Vernier (77 sqm). On average there are 2.72 inhabitants per residence. In 2016, Satigny had 663 buildings, of which 49.6% were separate houses. However, this percentage is expected to keep falling as new developments are built, such as Les Celliers (77 apartments), Champ-Magnin (around 30 apartments), Pré-Gentil (80 apartments), or the Pôle Satigny-Gare (80 apartments).

From the 2000 census, 1,075 or 38.6% were Roman Catholic, while 735 or 26.4% belonged to the Swiss Reformed Church. Of the rest of the population, there were 12 members of an Orthodox church (or about 0.43% of the population), there were 7 individuals (or about 0.25% of the population) who belonged to the Christian Catholic Church, and there were 72 individuals (or about 2.59% of the population) who belonged to another Christian church. There were 4 individuals (or about 0.14% of the population) who were Jewish, and 16 (or about 0.57% of the population) who were Islamic. There were 17 individuals who were Buddhist, 2 individuals who were Hindu and 4 individuals who belonged to another church. 617 (or about 22.15% of the population) belonged to no church, are agnostic or atheist, and 224 individuals (or about 8.04% of the population) did not answer the question.

== Economy ==
As of 2019, there were 8,698 workers employed in the municipality, which compares with the 4,109 residents that Satigny had on the same year. Of those, 4,365 were employed in the secondary sector; 4,132 in the tertiary sector, and 201 in the primary sector. In the latest available statistic on commuting patterns from 2000, there were 7,090 workers who commuted into the municipality and 1,056 workers who commuted away, and only the city of Geneva as a higher ratio of commuters into/out of the town. About 27.7% of the workforce coming into Satigny were coming from outside Switzerland, while 0.2% of the locals commute out of Switzerland for work. Of the working population, 13.5% used public transportation to get to work, and 66.6% used a private car.

The main reason for the economic attractiveness of the municipality are its industrial areas of which it counts three: Bois-de-Bay "ZIBAY", la Tuilière "ZITUIL", and the Zone Industrielle Meyrin-Satigny "ZIMEYSA". The latter is the largest industrial area of the canton of Geneva, and together with the section in Vernier, it has a total of 15,000 jobs distributed between the municipalities of Satigny, Meyrin, and Vernier. In addition to being served by its own train stop, accessible from Satigny in 2 minutes and from Geneva in 11 minutes, several companies in Satigny's side of ZIMEYSA have direct railroad access, such as Feldschlösschen.

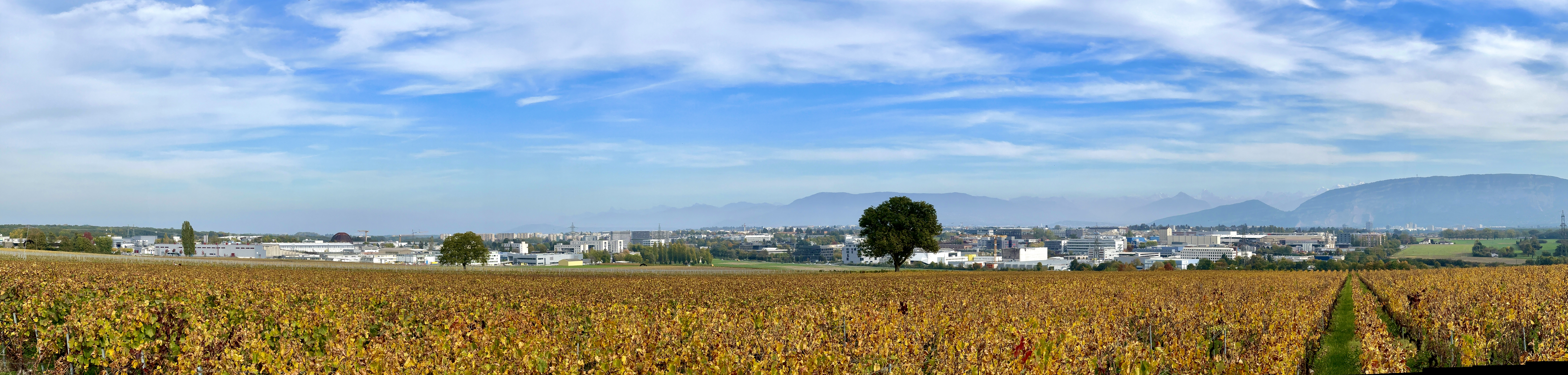
The ZIMEYSA industrial area of Satigny, with the Alps in the background and the CERN on the left of the picture

Some of the largest companies located in Satigny are Firmenich, the world's largest privately owned company in the manufacture of fragrances and flavours and number two worldwide in the field; Hitachi Energy (ex-ABB Sécheron) which specialises in electrical engineering, including the manufacture of transformers that equip half the trains running in Europe; the DeWitt luxury watchmaking company; MCI Group, a large global event, association management and congress management company; Sécheron Traction Power, the world's leading supplier of electrical equipment for DC traction substations for the global rail industry; HelvéCie, the largest bus and coach company of French-speaking Switzerland; GVA MONTRES, a manufacturer of watch components; or foreign subsidiaries such as Fnac Suisse, a large media retailer.

ZIBAY is entirely in Satigny and, in 2017, had 1,700 workers. The area specialises in companies dedicated to recycling and construction. In addition, it hosts the SIG's Bois-de-Bay water treatment plant, one of the largest in the country.

In addition to industrial areas, the municipality is also the largest wine-producing town of the Canton of Geneva and of Switzerland: 80% of Geneva's wine is produced in the town, and it is home to "La Cave de Genève", by far the largest wine-making cooperative of the canton. Several different types of wine are produced in the town, the largest of which are Gamay, Pinot Noir, Chasselas and Gamaret.

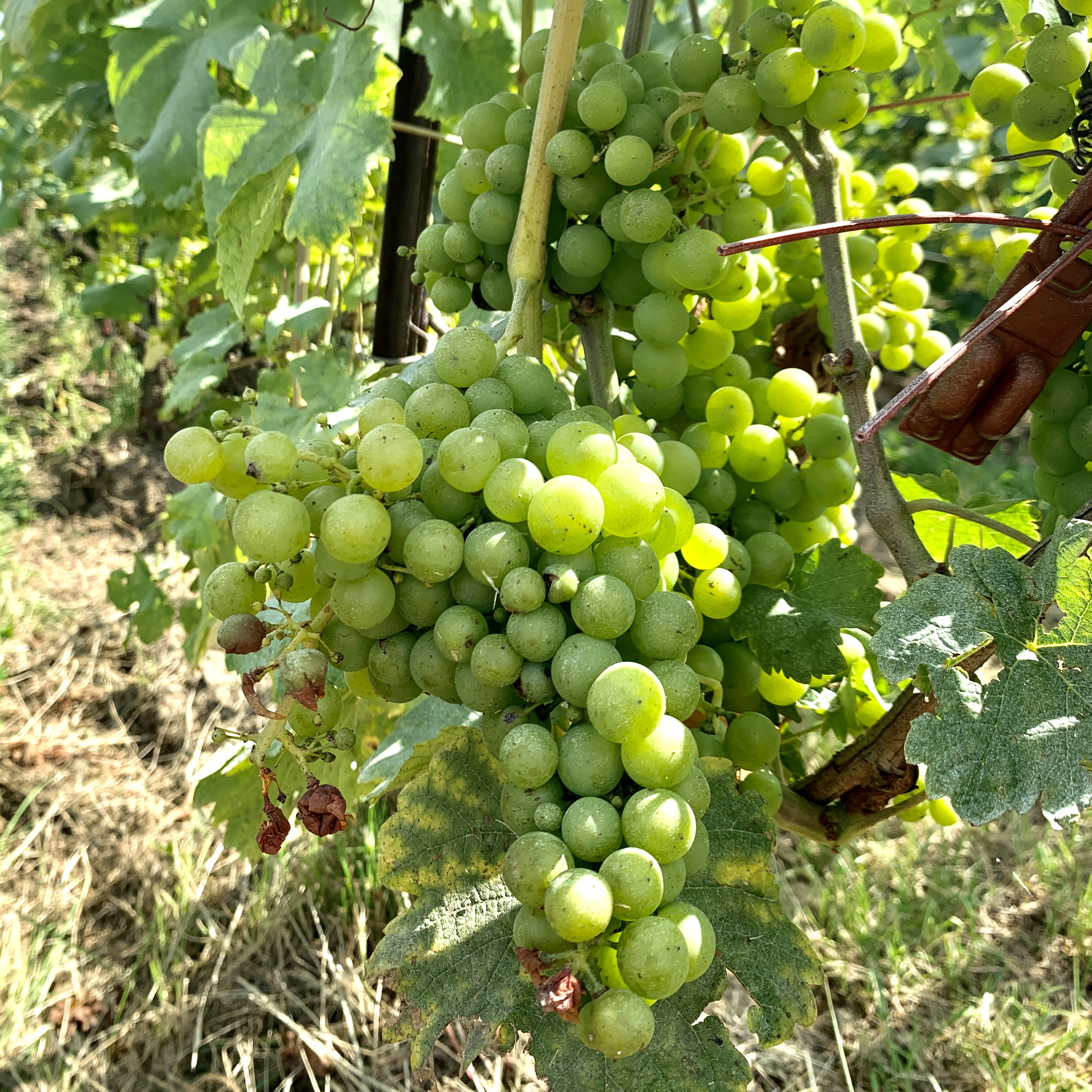
Chasselas grapes in Satigny, close to the harvesting period. This is one of the largest wine varieties grown in the town.

== Transportation ==
The Léman Express rail network, showing Satigny connected by the L5 and the L6

Rail provides the most important means of public transport of the municipality towards the rest of the canton and Geneva's city centre. Satigny is connected to the Léman Express rail network with its own station in the centre of Satigny-village. Two lines service the town: the L6 Genève-Bellegarde, and the L5 Genève-La Plaine. Services are frequent (up to 1 train every 15 minutes), and fast: it only takes 13 minutes to reach Geneva's main train station in Cornavin. In addition, the industrial area of ZIMEYSA has its own station bearing the same name, serving commuters of the industries and offices there located.

The TPG, Geneva's public transport operator, operates secondary bus lines within the municipality. The main one is line 72, which connects the hamlets of Bourdigny, Choully, and Peissy to Satigny-village and its train station. Another important line is the number 73 which connects Satigny-village to Peney, the industrial area of Bois-de-Bay, the small industrial area of La Tuillière, Vernier and the ZIMEYSA. Finally, two more lines, the 70 and 71, connect the town to two tram lines, in Meyrin (71) and Bernex (70), the latter via Aire-la-Ville (that town's only means of public transport).

All means of public transport operate under the unireso network, so a single ticket is valid for the train and buses and all other connections.

Geneva's airport is close to Satigny and it only takes a 10 minutes drive to reach it by car. By means of public transport, it is usually accessed by train with a change in Vernier and a bus from there, which takes around 25 minutes.

The main connecting road of the municipality is the route du Mandement, which connects the D-884 in France to Meyrin via Dardagny, Russin, and Satigny. The A1 motorway connecting Geneva to the rest of Switzerland and to France passes underneath Vernier, close to border with Satigny. At the moment, there are no direct exits to Satigny, the closest exits being located in Vernier/Meyrin and Bernex. However, an existing project in advanced planning stages, the "barreau routier de Montfleury", whose construction was originally planned to start in 2020, will create a direct connection to the A1 in direction to Bernex and France from La Tuillière and ZIMEYSA industrial areas. This project aims to remove from local roads much of the road traffic to and from the three industrial areas of the town. Discussions are underway to modify the original plan to include a connection in direction to Switzerland as well.

== Politics ==
In the 2007 federal election the most popular party was the SVP which received 20.63% of the vote. The next three most popular parties were the Green Party (16.52%), the FDP (16.37%) and the LPS Party (15.09%). In the federal election, a total of 894 votes were cast, and the voter turnout was 52.7%.

In the 2009 Grand Conseil election, there were a total of 1,833 registered voters of which 806 (44.0%) voted. The most popular party in the municipality for this election was the Les Radicaux with 17.6% of the ballots. In the canton-wide election they received the sixth highest proportion of votes. The second most popular party was the Les Verts (with 17.3%), they were also second in the canton-wide election, while the third most popular party was the Libéral (with 14.8%), they were first in the canton-wide election.

For the 2009 Conseil d'Etat election, there were a total of 1,832 registered voters of which 996 (54.4%) voted.

In 2011, all the municipalities held local elections, and in Satigny there were 19 spots open on the municipal council. There were a total of 2,381 registered voters of which 1,172 (49.2%) voted. Out of the 1,172 votes, there were 11 blank votes, 10 null or unreadable votes and 169 votes with a name that was not on the list.

== Education ==
In Satigny about 857 or (30.8%) of the population have completed non-mandatory upper secondary education, and 608 or (21.8%) have completed additional higher education (either university or a Fachhochschule). Of the 608 who completed tertiary schooling, 40.6% were Swiss men, 28.6% were Swiss women, 17.8% were non-Swiss men and 13.0% were non-Swiss women.

During the 2009–2010 school year there were a total of 763 students in the Satigny school system. The education system in the Canton of Geneva allows young children to attend two years of non-obligatory Kindergarten. During that school year, there were 95 children who were in a pre-kindergarten class. The canton's school system provides two years of non-mandatory kindergarten and requires students to attend six years of primary school, with some of the children attending smaller, specialized classes. In Satigny there were 93 students in kindergarten or primary school and 10 students were in the special, smaller classes. The secondary school program consists of three lower, obligatory years of schooling, followed by three to five years of optional, advanced schools. There were 93 lower secondary students who attended school in Satigny. There were 143 upper secondary students from the municipality along with 21 students who were in a professional, non-university track program. An additional 43 students attended a private school.

As of 2000, there were 7 students in Satigny who came from another municipality, while 261 residents attended schools outside the municipality.

== Heritage sites of national significance ==
Choully Castle and Farms in Choully and Domaine Pellegrin in Peissy are listed as Swiss heritage site of national significance. The villages of Bourdigny, Choully, Peissy and the Satigny-Dessus area are all part of the Inventory of Swiss Heritage Sites as a larger 'Mandement' site.

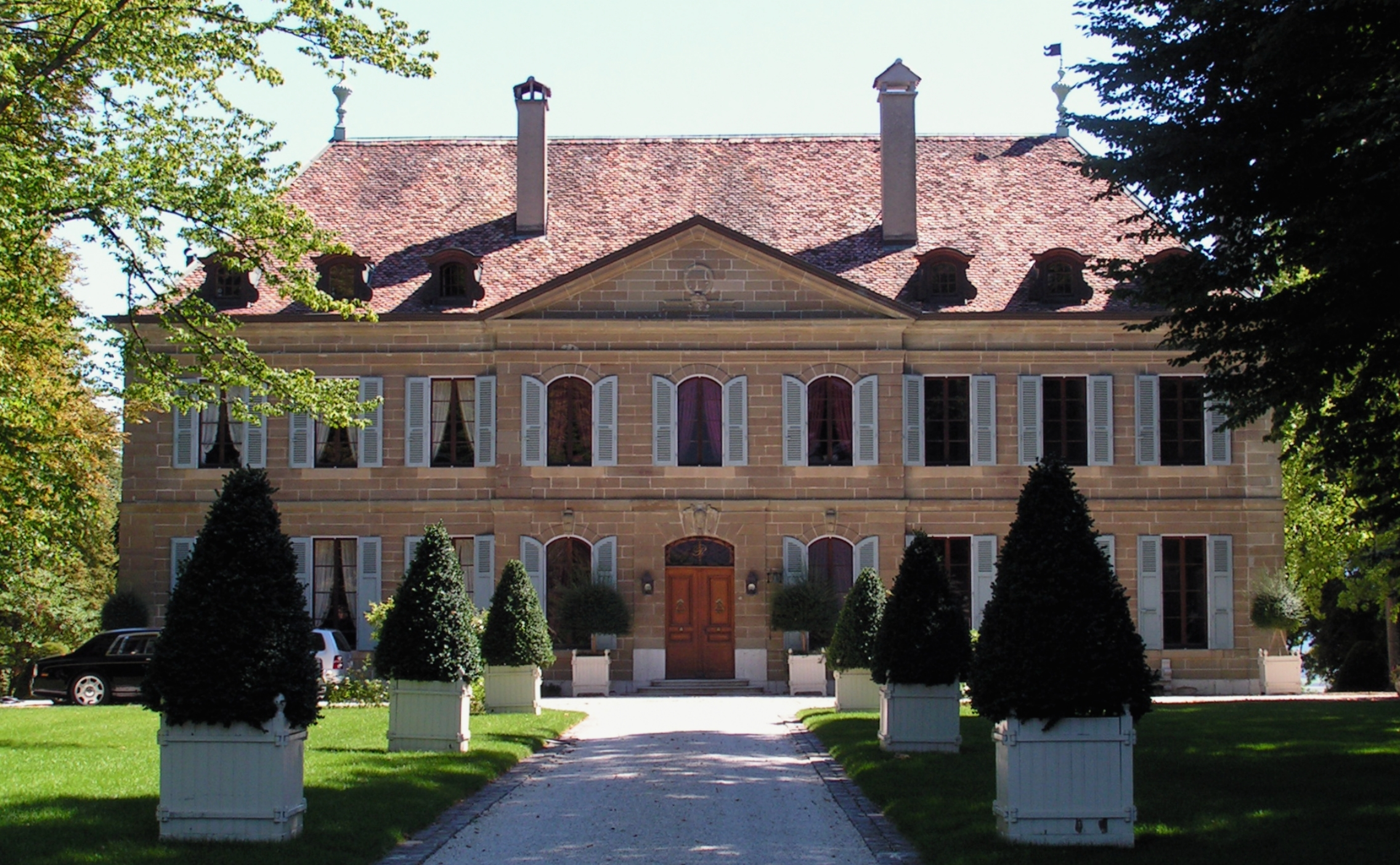
Choully Castle

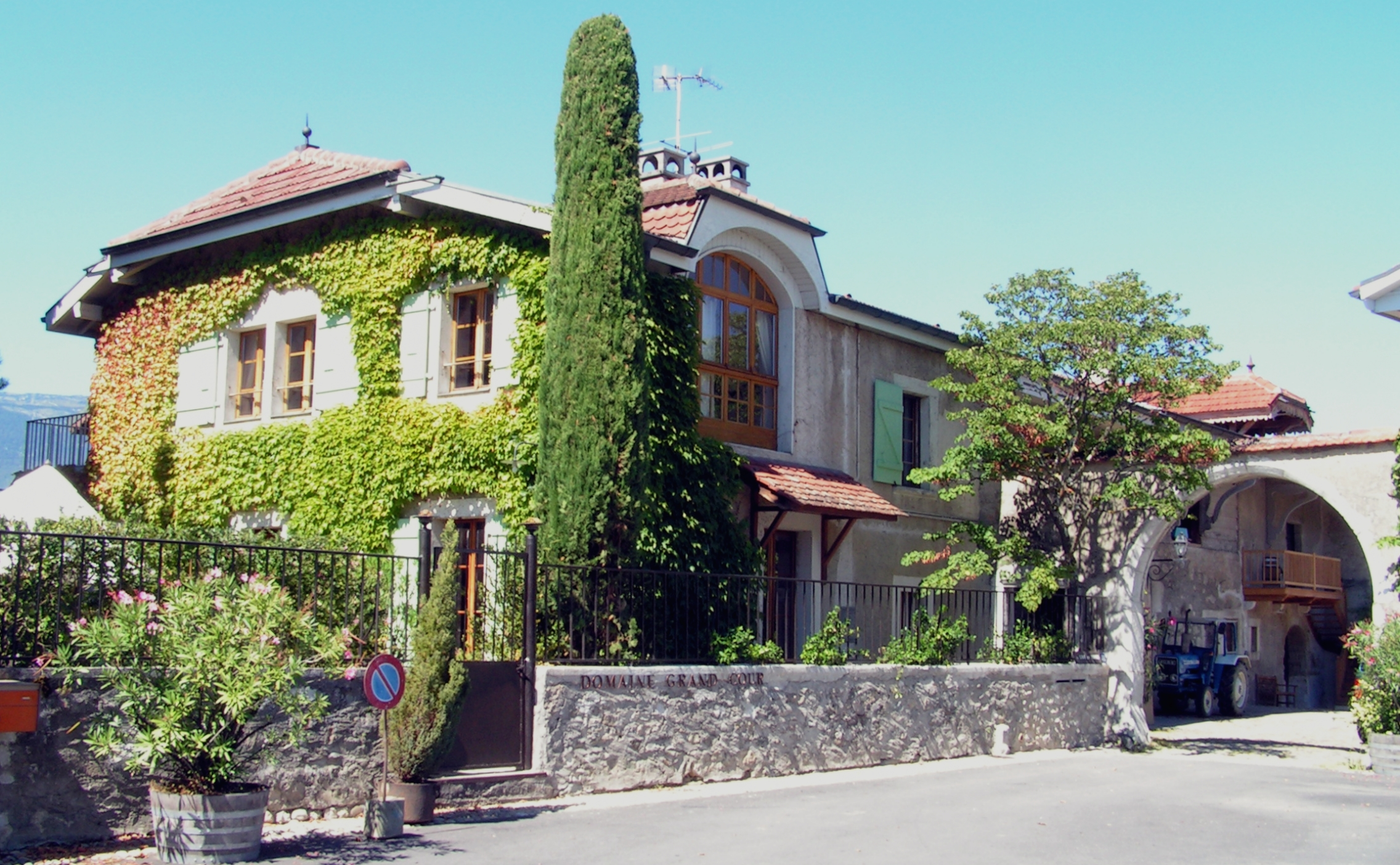
Domaine Pellegrin
