= Joseph Motie House =

Historic house in Iowa, United States

- U.S. National Register of Historic Places
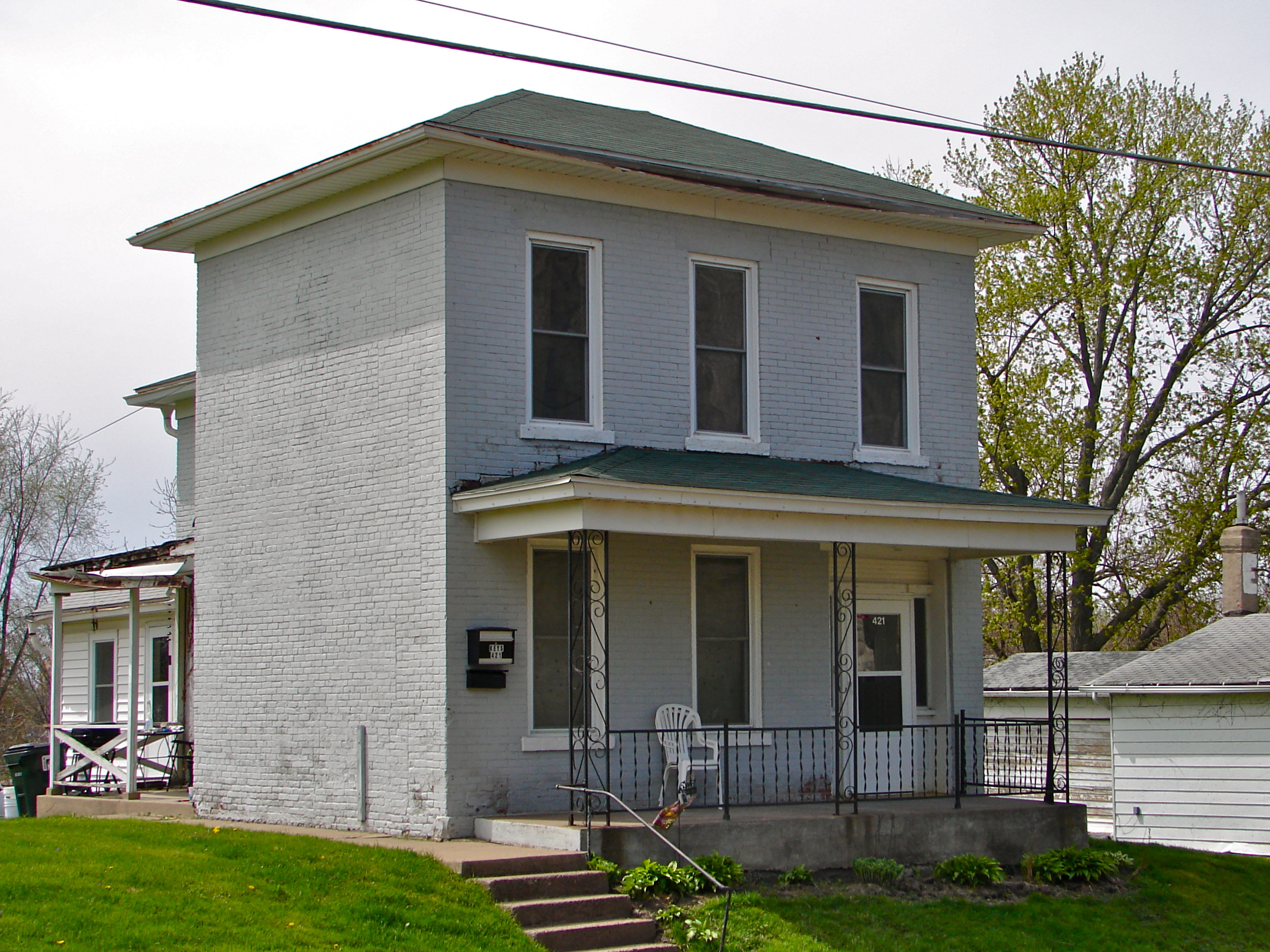

- Location within Iowa Location within the United States
- Location: 421 E. 10th St. Davenport, Iowa
- Coordinates: 41°31′47″N 90°34′7″W
- Area: less than one acre
- Built: 1860
- Architectural style: Italianate
- MPS: Davenport MRA
- NRHP reference No.: 83003668
- Added to NRHP: November 18, 1983

The Joseph Motie House is a historic building located in the Cork Hill neighborhood of Davenport, Iowa, United States. It has been listed on the National Register of Historic Places since 1983.

== History ==
Joseph G. Motie worked as a bricklayer and he may have done the masonry work on this house when it was built in 1860. He and his wife Mary lived here for over 30 years.

== Architecture ==
The house is similar to the neighboring Joseph Mallet House. It is a simplified version of the Italianate style that was built in the city of Davenport from the mid-1850s. The house is a two-story, three–bay structure with an entrance that is off center. Like many early Italianate homes in Davenport, it retained some features of the Greek Revival style. These are found in the glass-framed doorway and the simple window pediments.
