= Bellerive Castle =

Château in Switzerland

Coordinates: 46°15′28″N 6°11′45″E

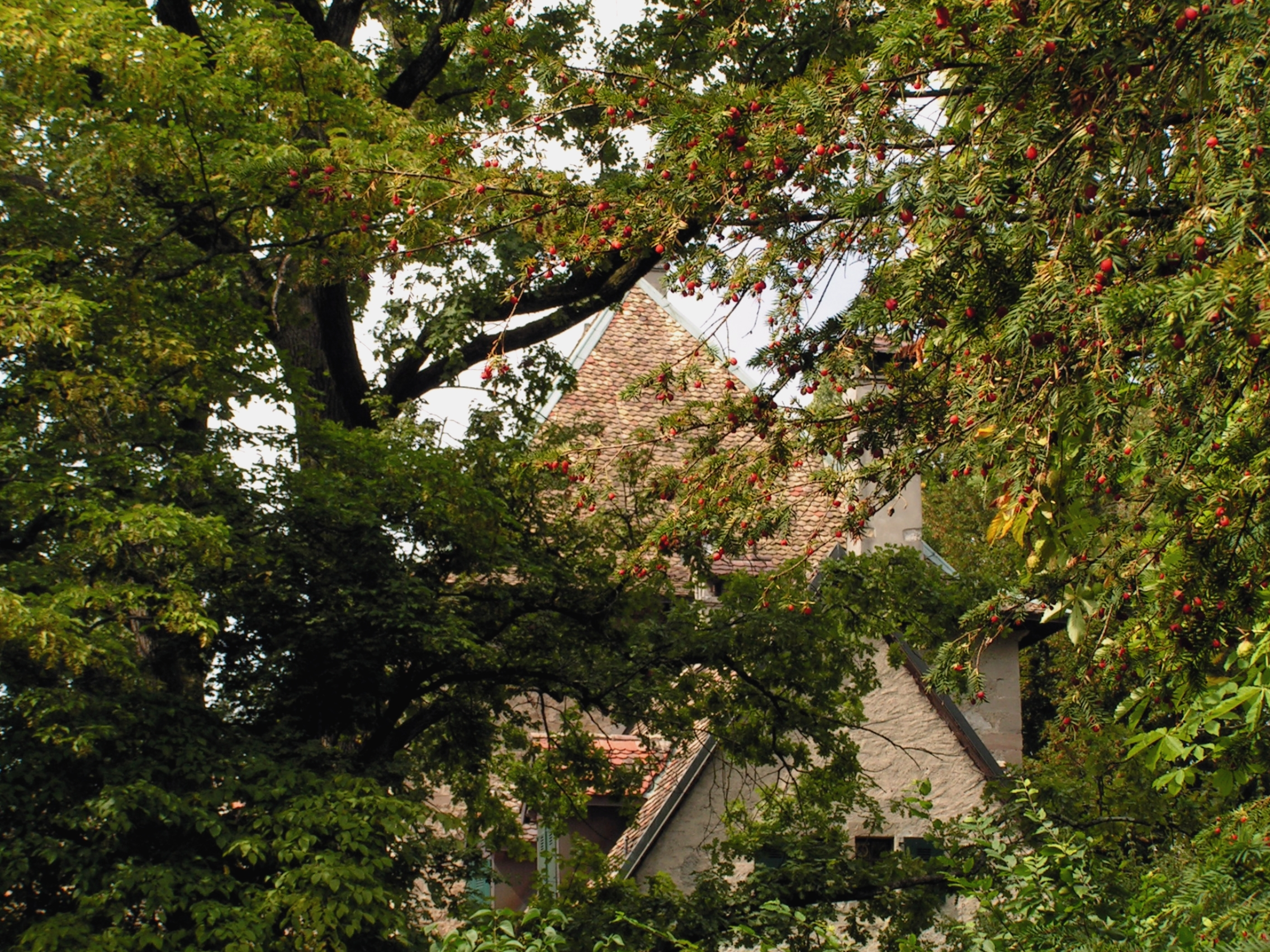
The roof of Bellerive Castle

Bellerive Castle (French: Château de Bellerive) is a château in the municipality of Collonge-Bellerive of the Canton of Geneva in Switzerland. It is a Swiss heritage site of national significance. Bellerive Castle was constructed in 1666 for Charles-Emmanuel II. The construction was received with resentment by the locals and led to a war between the Republic of Geneva and the Duchy of Savoy.

The château was formerly the home of Prince Sadruddin Aga Khan. On 31 August 2013, it was the setting for the wedding of Prince Rahim Aga Khan and Kendra Spears, who then became known as Princess Salwa Aga Khan. In 2022 it was reported that Dinara Kulibaeva has bought Bellerive Castle for an alleged price of 106 million Swiss francs.

== See also ==
- List of castles in Switzerland
