= Immeuble Clarté =

Coordinates: 46°12′0″N 6°9′24″E

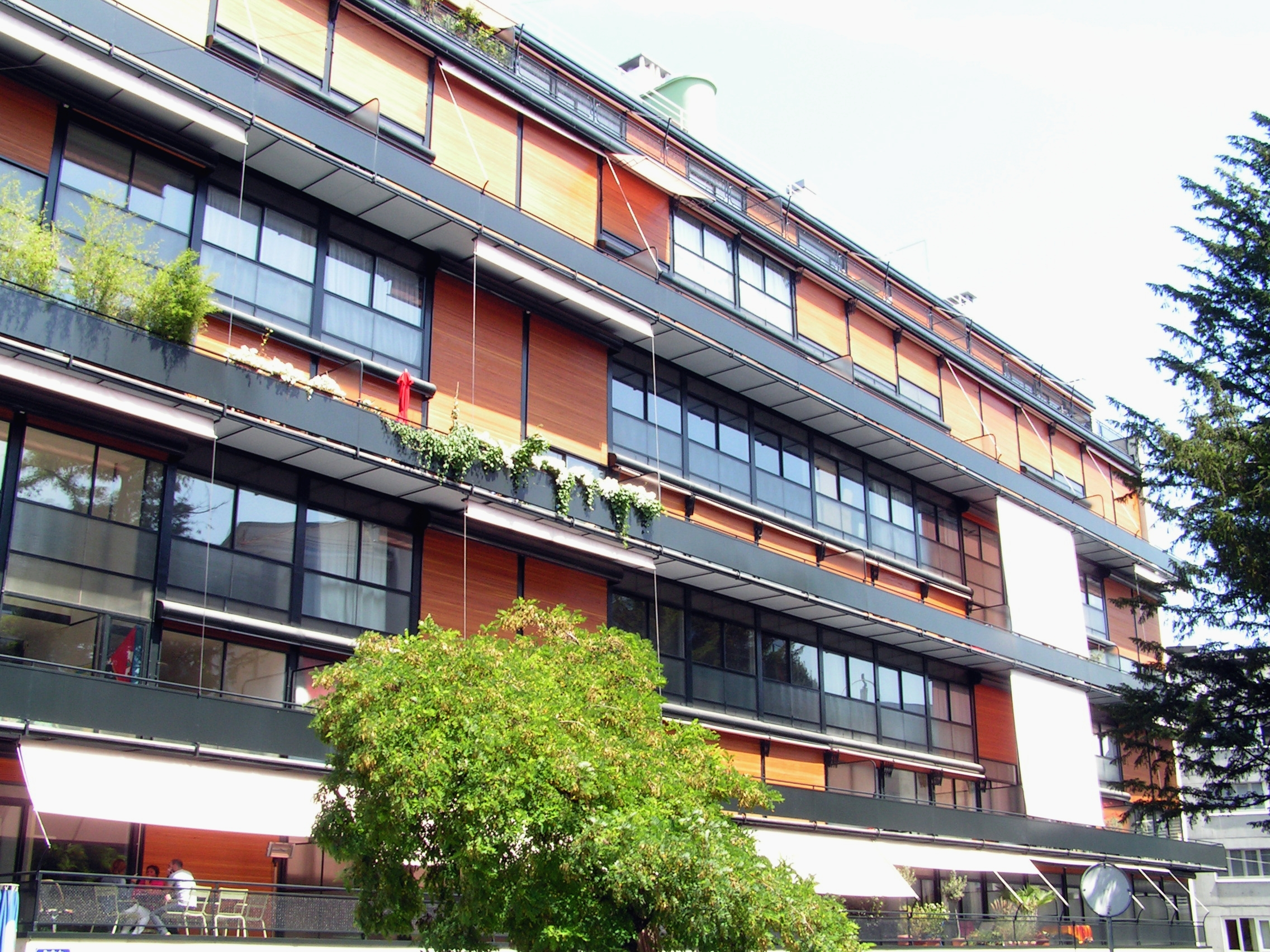
- Interactive map of the Immeuble Clarté area
- Alternative names: Maison Clarté

General information
- Type: Residential
- Architectural style: Modernist
- Location: Rue Saint-Laurent 2–4, Geneva, Switzerland
- Construction started: 1931
- Completed: 1932
- Renovated: 1975

Technical details
- Floor count: 9

Design and construction
- Architects: Le Corbusier and Pierre Jeanneret

Renovating team
- Architects: Pascal Haüsermann, Bruno Camoletti

UNESCO World Heritage Site
- Part of: The Architectural Work of Le Corbusier, an Outstanding Contribution to the Modern Movement
- Criteria: Cultural: (i), (ii), (vi)
- Reference: 1321rev-007
- Inscription: 2016 (40th Session)
- Area: 0.15 ha (16,000 sq ft)
- Buffer zone: 1.8 ha (190,000 sq ft)

Immeuble Clarté is an apartment building in Geneva designed by Le Corbusier and Pierre Jeanneret starting from 1928 and built in 1931–32. It has eight stories comprising 45 free plan units of diverse configurations and sizes. It is one of Le Corbusier's key early projects in which he explored the principles of modernist architecture in apartment buildings, which later led to the Unité d'Habitation design principle.

After it escaped demolition in the 1960s, the building was first renovated in the 1970s. After being again threatened with demolition in the early 1980s, in 1986 it was listed as a historic monument. In July 2016, the building and several other works by Le Corbusier were inscribed as UNESCO World Heritage Sites.

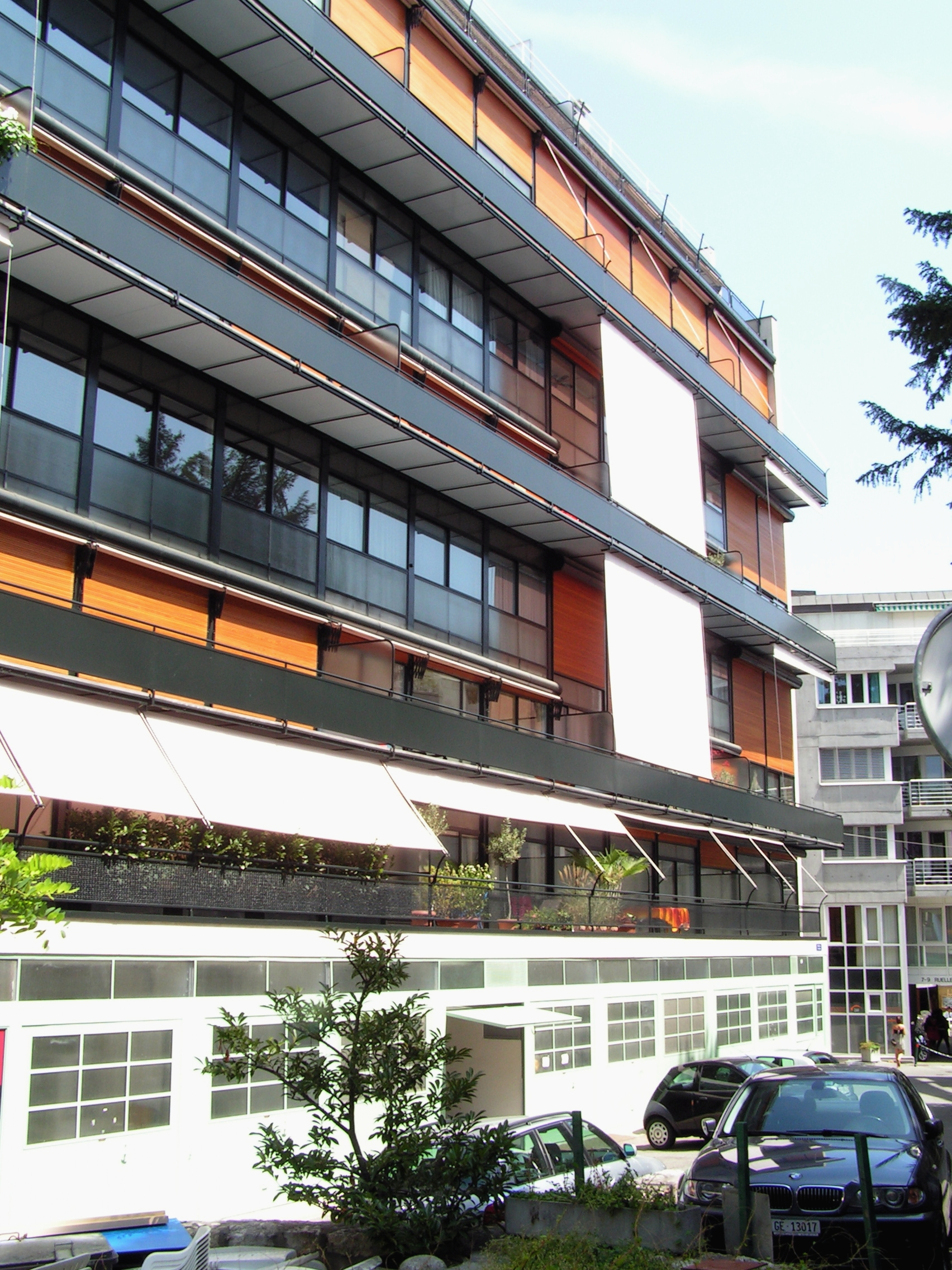
