= Choully Castle =

Swiss castle in Geneva

Coordinates: 46°13′23″N 6°01′47″E

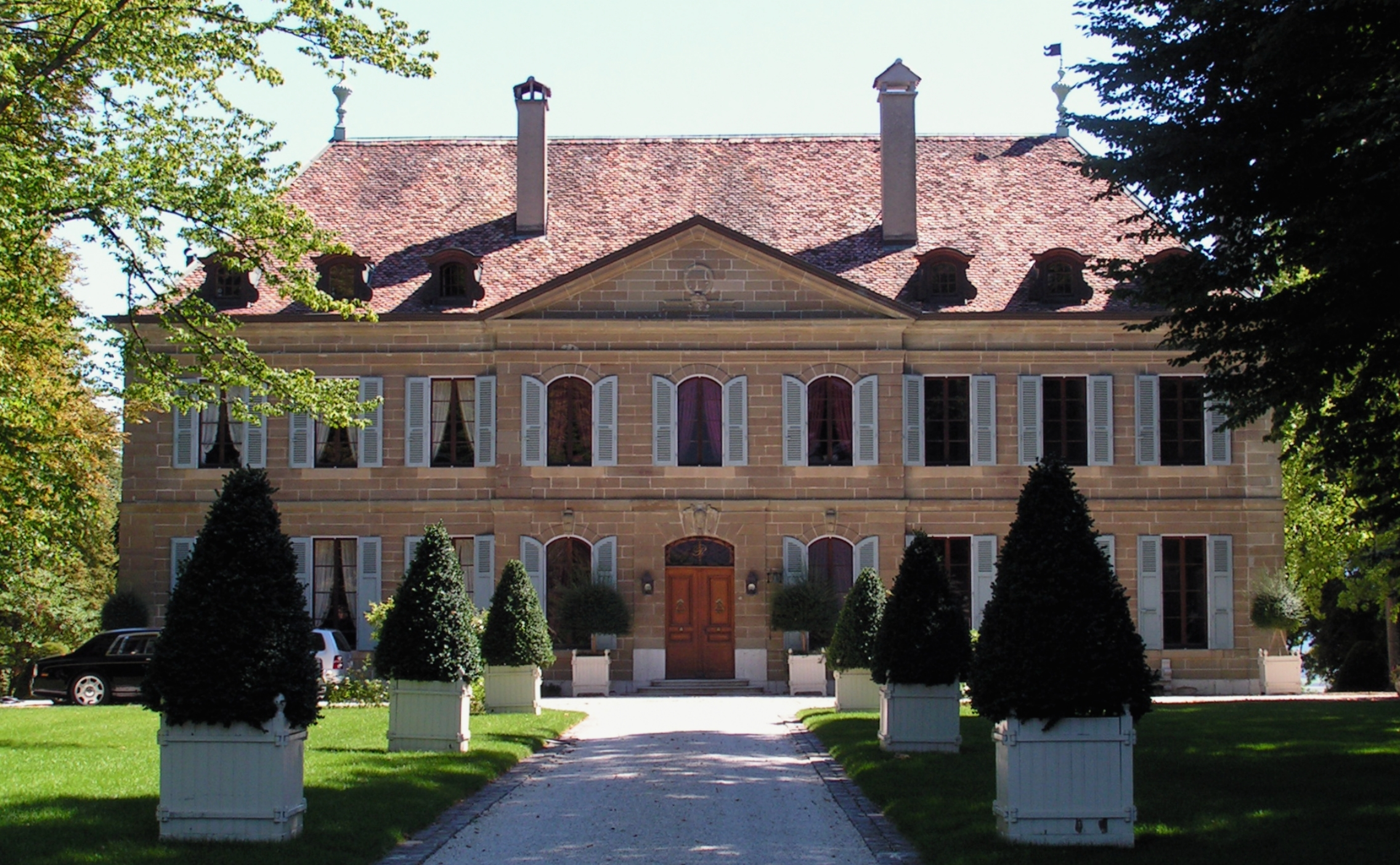
Choully Castle

Choully Castle is a castle in the municipality of Satigny of the Canton of Geneva in Switzerland. It is a Swiss heritage site of national significance.

== See also ==
- List of castles in Switzerland
