= Mallett Hall (Pownal Center, Maine) =

- U.S. National Register of Historic Places
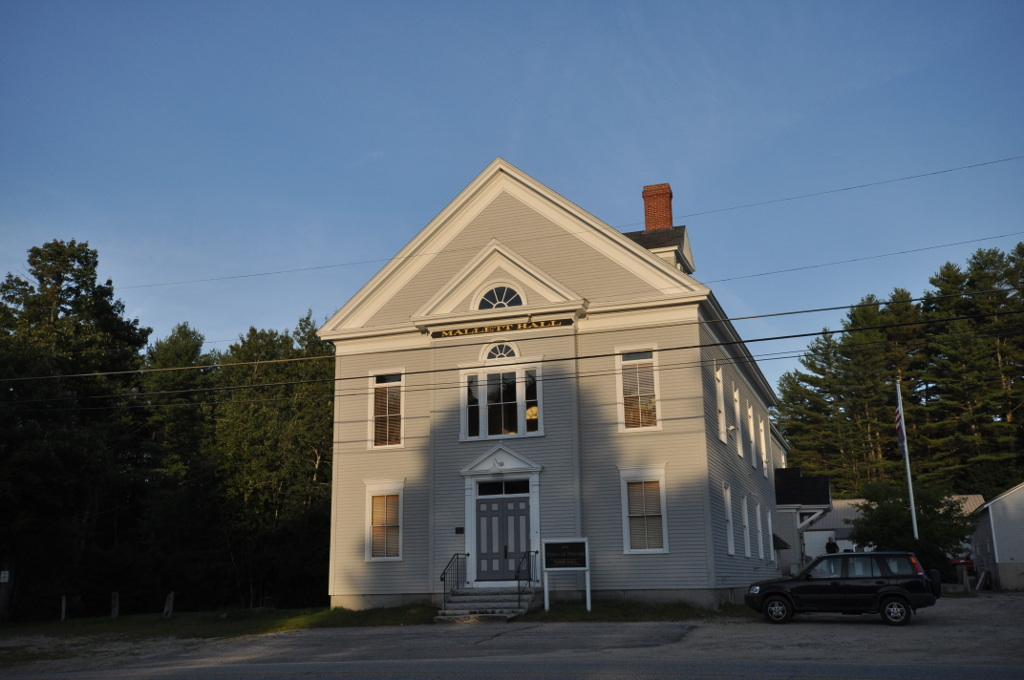

- Location within Maine Location within the United States
- Location: Rt. 9, E side, N of Dyer Rd., Pownal, Maine
- Coordinates: 43°53′34″N 70°11′3″W
- Area: less than one acre
- Built: 1886
- Architectural style: Colonial Revival
- NRHP reference No.: 91001511
- Added to NRHP: October 16, 1991

Mallett Hall is the town hall of Pownal, Maine. It is an architecturally distinctive Colonial Revival building, constructed in 1886 in the crossroads village of Pownal Center. It was listed on the National Register of Historic Places in 1991 for its architecture.

== Description and history ==
Mallett Hall is located on the east side of Hallowell Road (Maine State Route 9), just north of its junction with Dyer Road and south of Bradbury Mountain State Park. It is a 2-1/2 story wood frame structure, with a gable roof, clapboard siding, and a granite foundation. It has a symmetrical front facade, with a slightly projecting central bay flanked by window bays. The centrally located entrance is a double door flanked by pilasters and topped by a transom window and gabled pediment, and there is a tall Palladian window on the second level above. The projection is capped by a pedimented gable (echoing in proportions the main gable, which is also pedimented) with an inset half-round window. The interior's most elaborate feature is a freestanding central staircase, which is flanked by office spaces, and leads to the second-floor auditorium. A smaller meeting space is located behind it on the first floor.

The hall was built in 1886, and is one of the small rural community's most architecturally sophisticated buildings; its architect is not known, but may be Portland architect Francis Fassett. In addition to housing town offices and functions, it has also served as a community center, hosting social events. The hall is named for Edmund Mallett, a Freeport businessman who donated $1,200 for its construction, conditioned on public use of the auditorium.

== See also ==
- National Register of Historic Places listings in Waldo County, Maine
