= Mallett Hall (Lee, Maine) =

- U.S. National Register of Historic Places
- Location within Maine Location within the United States
- Location: ME 6 N side, 0.1 mi. E of jct. with ME 168, Lee, Maine
- Coordinates: 45°21′35″N 68°17′3″W
- Area: less than one acre
- Built: 1889
- Architectural style: Late Victorian
- NRHP reference No.: 93001115
- Added to NRHP: October 29, 1993

Mallett Hall is a historic former hotel building at 2782 Lee Road (Maine State Route 6) in Lee, Maine. Built in 1889, it is a rare surviving example of a once-common form, a country hotel in rural Maine. Now owned by the local historical society, it serves as a community function space. It was listed on the National Register of Historic Places in 1993.

== Description and history ==
Mallett Hall is located on the north side of Lee Road, just east of Lee Academy near the center of the rural community. It is a long rectangular wood frame structure, two stories in height, with a hip roof and granite foundation. The south-facing front facade is asymmetrical, with a picture window and sash window to the right of the off-center door, and two sash windows to its left. There are six sash windows on the second level, above the single-story porch that wraps around to the right (east) side. The east facade has thirteen windows on the first floor and eleven on the second. The first floor housed public and office spaces of the hotel, including a dining room, kitchen, and an open central hall. The upstairs originally house four bedrooms and a large dance hall, the latter converted to dormitory-style bedrooms in the 1930s.

Mallett Hall was built in 1889 by James Mallett as a small hotel serving travelers along what is now Route 6, then the main road between Lincoln, Maine (the nearest railroad stop) and Fredericton, New Brunswick. The hotel was operated under various names by members of the Mallett family into the 1920s. In 1930 the building was purchased and given to Lee Academy, which converted the ballroom into dormitory space. In 1975 the building was adapted to house apartment units, and in 1993 it was transferred to the local historical society and restored.

== See also ==
- National Register of Historic Places listings in Penobscot County, Maine
