= Joseph Mallet House =

Historic house in Iowa, United States

- U.S. National Register of Historic Places
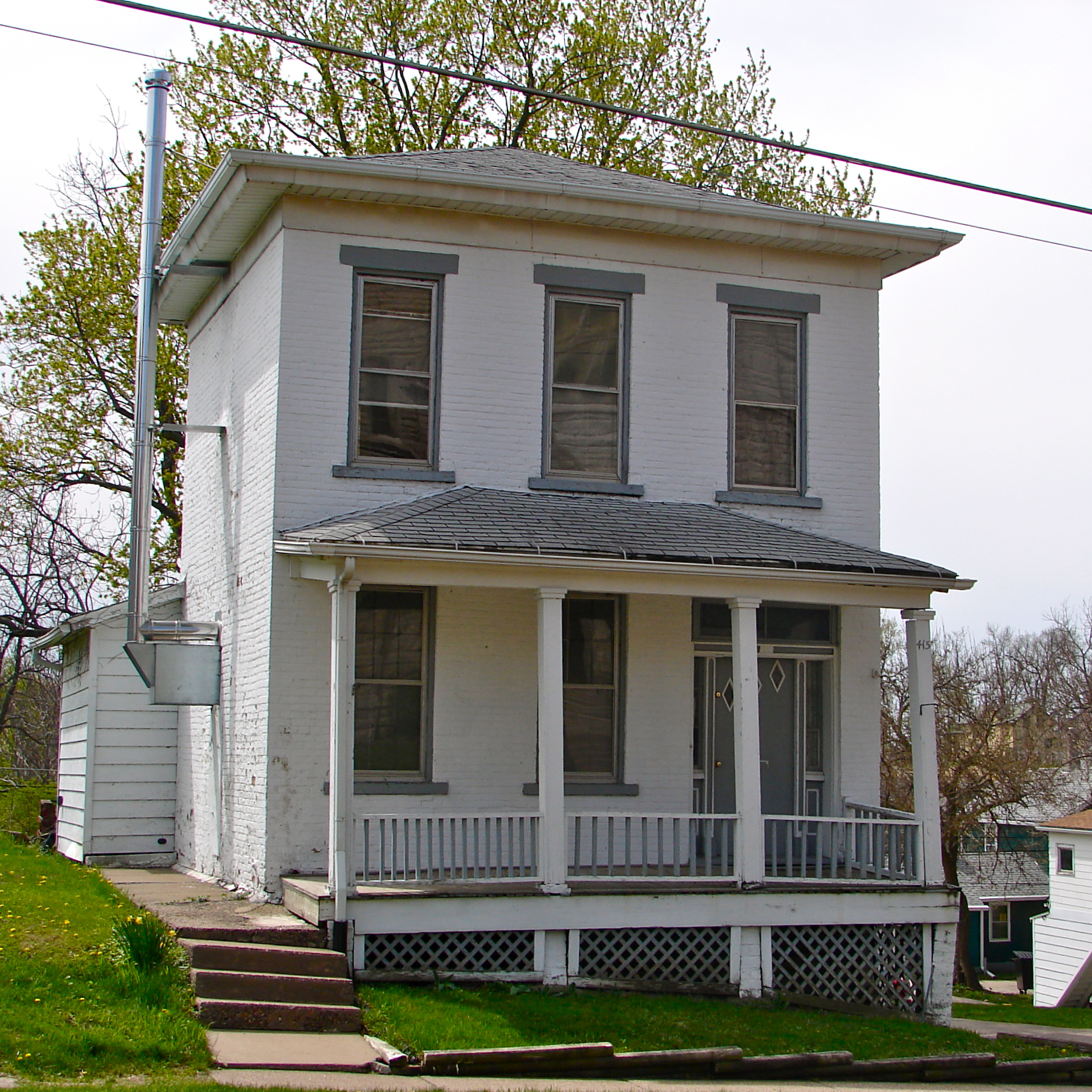

- Location within Iowa Location within the United States
- Location: 415 E. 10th St. Davenport, Iowa
- Coordinates: 41°31′47″N 90°34′8″W
- Area: less than one acre
- Built: 1870
- Architectural style: Italianate
- MPS: Davenport MRA
- NRHP reference No.: 83002465
- Added to NRHP: July 7, 1983

The Joseph Mallet House is a historic building located in the Cork Hill neighborhood of Davenport, Iowa, United States. It was built by Joseph Mallet and has had a series of tenets over the years rather than owners. It is a simplified version of the Italianate style found in the city of Davenport. The house is a two-story, three–bay structure with an entrance that is off center. Like many early Italianate homes in Davenport it retained some features of the Greek Revival style. These are found in the glass framed doorway and the simple window pediments. The house has been listed on the National Register of Historic Places since 1983.
