= Municipalities of the canton of Geneva =

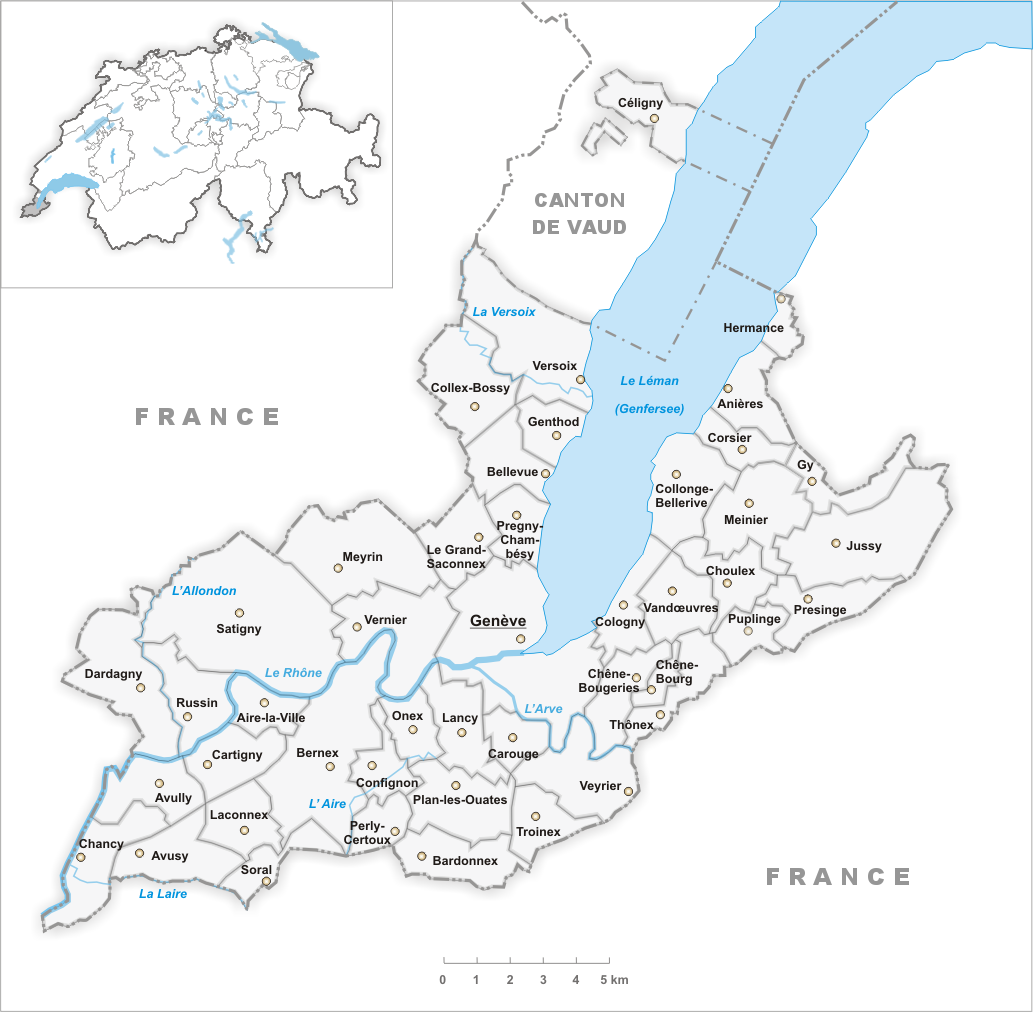
Municipalities in the canton of Geneva

The following are the 45 municipalities of the canton of Geneva, as of 2025.

== List ==
| Coat | Name | Population (31 December 2020) | Area in hectares |
|---|---|---|---|
| Aire-la-Ville | Aire-la-Ville | 1,160 | 293 |
| Anières | Anières | 2,381 | 387 |
| Avully | Avully | 1,756 | 462 |
| Avusy | Avusy | 1,391 | 517 |
| Bardonnex | Bardonnex | 2,396 | 500 |
| Bellevue | Bellevue | 3,467 | 436 |
| Bernex | Bernex | 10,258 | 1295 |
| Carouge | Carouge | 22,536 | 270 |
| Cartigny | Cartigny | 971 | 438 |
| Céligny | Céligny | 792 | 465 |
| Chancy | Chancy | 1,708 | 538 |
| Chêne-Bougeries | Chêne-Bougeries | 12,621 | 414 |
| Chêne-Bourg | Chêne-Bourg | 8,791 | 128 |
| Choulex | Choulex | 1,182 | 391 |
| Collex-Bossy | Collex-Bossy | 1,686 | 689 |
| Collonge-Bellerive | Collonge-Bellerive | 8,445 | 612 |
| Cologny | Cologny | 5,866 | 366 |
| Confignon | Confignon | 4,579 | 277 |
| Corsier | Corsier | 2,295 | 274 |
| Dardagny | Dardagny | 1,855 | 860 |
| Geneva | Geneva | 203,856 | 1592 |
| Genthod | Genthod | 2,893 | 287 |
| Le Grand-Saconnex | Le Grand-Saconnex | 12,378 | 438 |
| Gy | Gy | 473 | 329 |
| Hermance | Hermance | 1,073 | 144 |
| Jussy | Jussy | 1,233 | 1135 |
| Laconnex | Laconnex | 710 | 383 |
| Lancy | Lancy | 33,989 | 478 |
| Meinier | Meinier | 2,115 | 695 |
| Meyrin | Meyrin | 26,129 | 994 |
| Onex | Onex | 18,933 | 281 |
| Perly-Certoux | Perly-Certoux | 3,127 | 254 |
| Plan-les-Ouates | Plan-les-Ouates | 10,601 | 585 |
| Pregny-Chambésy | Pregny-Chambésy | 3,803 | 324 |
| Presinge | Presinge | 696 | 471 |
| Puplinge | Puplinge | 2,488 | 267 |
| Russin | Russin | 530 | 491 |
| Satigny | Satigny | 4,286 | 1892 |
| Soral | Soral | 976 | 294 |
| Thônex | Thônex | 14,573 | 382 |
| Troinex | Troinex | 2,551 | 343 |
| Vandœuvres | Vandœuvres | 2,754 | 442 |
| Vernier | Vernier | 34,898 | 769 |
| Versoix | Versoix | 13,281 | 1050 |
| Veyrier | Veyrier | 11,861 | 650 |
