= List of cultural property of regional significance in Switzerland: Geneva =

This list contains all cultural property of regional significance (class B) in the canton of Geneva from the 2014 Swiss Inventory of Cultural Property of National and Regional Significance. It is sorted by municipality. The geographic coordinates provided are in the Swiss coordinate system as given in the Inventory.

== Avully ==
KGS No.^{?}	Picture	Name	Street Address	CH1903 X coordinate	CH1903 Y coordinate	Location
02378		Domaine Desbaillets / de Normandie	Route de Moulin-Roget 33	488.810	114.040	46.168652°N 5.998921°E
02379		Domaine Mottu / Mallet	Route de Moulin-Roget 6	488.930	114.140	46.169572°N 6.00045°E
11803	Temple	Temple	Route du Moulin-Roget 12	488.885	114.115	46.169339°N 5.999874°E

== Avusy ==
KGS No.^{?}	Picture	Name	Street Address	CH1903 X coordinate	CH1903 Y coordinate	Location
02380		Château de Champlong	Chemin du Cannelet 74	488.100	112.060	46.150727°N 5.990203°E

== Bardonnex ==
KGS No.^{?}	Picture	Name	Street Address	CH1903 X coordinate	CH1903 Y coordinate	Location
10011		Capite de vigne de Verbant		498.675	112.090	46.152669°N 6.127051°E
02381		Domaine d'Evordes	Chemin des Forches 50	499.780	111.650	46.148877°N 6.141446°E
11594		Landecy, Archives Micheli	Route du Prieur 50	498.756	111.285	46.145441°N 6.128274°E
02385		Landecy, Ferme Perdriau	Route du Prieur 20	498.930	111.170	46.144433°N 6.13055°E
02386		Maison forte	Place De Brunes 28	496.880	111.640	46.14835°N 6.10392°E

== Bellevue ==
KGS No.^{?}	Picture	Name	Street Address	CH1903 X coordinate	CH1903 Y coordinate	Location
02388		Domaine de Riencour	Route de Lausanne 305	500.650	123.100	46.251991°N 6.150272°E
02389		Domaine des Chênes	Chemin des Mastellettes 2	500.510	123.510	46.255658°N 6.14837°E
02387		Villa Bella Vista	Route de Lausanne 308	500.770	123.101	46.252018°N 6.151828°E

== Bernex ==
KGS No.^{?}	Picture	Name	Street Address	CH1903 X coordinate	CH1903 Y coordinate	Location
11804	Maison Théremin	Maison Théremin	Bernex 4	494.945	114.925	46.177597°N 6.078143°E

== Cartigny ==
KGS No.^{?}	Picture	Name	Street Address	CH1903 X coordinate	CH1903 Y coordinate	Location
02398	Château Duval	Château Duval	Route de Vallière 27	490.400	114.470	46.17278°N 6.019403°E
02399		Domaine Bordier	Rue du Temple 40	490.180	114.550	46.173464°N 6.016536°E
11841		Domaine de la Bergerie	Chemin de la Bergerie 3	490.740	114.420	46.172386°N 6.023816°E
10012		Maison Gallay	Chemin de la Bergerie 18	490.625	114.560	46.173626°N 6.022295°E
02400		Temple	Rue du Temple 23	490.225	114.590	46.173831°N 6.017109°E

== Chancy ==
KGS No.^{?}	Picture	Name	Street Address	CH1903 X coordinate	CH1903 Y coordinate	Location
02405	Temple	Temple	Route de Bellegarde 69	486.640	111.960	46.149584°N 5.971333°E

== Choulex ==
KGS No.^{?}	Picture	Name	Street Address	CH1903 X coordinate	CH1903 Y coordinate	Location
02413		Domaine de Miolan	Miolan 217	505.950	120.360	46.228108°N 6.219543°E
02414		Ferme de Miolan		505.707	120.167	46.226338°N 6.216432°E

== Collex-Bossy ==
KGS No.^{?}	Picture	Name	Street Address	CH1903 X coordinate	CH1903 Y coordinate	Location
11807		Chapelle de la Persécution	Chemin de la Fruitière 30	498.515	125.355	46.271955°N 6.1221°E
02415		Château et Ferme	Chaumets 35	498.240	125.155	46.270114°N 6.118577°E

== Collonge-Bellerive ==
KGS No.^{?}	Picture	Name	Street Address	CH1903 X coordinate	CH1903 Y coordinate	Location
11809		Maison forte de Vésenaz	Chemin du Vieux-Vésenaz 42	504.310	121.585	46.238895°N 6.198037°E

== Cologny ==
KGS No.^{?}	Picture	Name	Street Address	CH1903 X coordinate	CH1903 Y coordinate	Location
02422		Château El Masr	Route de la Capite 46	503.475	119.530	46.220292°N 6.187638°E
02423		Domaine Calandrini	Plateau de Frontenex 3	502.380	118.115	46.207407°N 6.173745°E
02425		Domaine du Grand-Cologny	Chemin du Guignard 1	503.000	118.745	46.213163°N 6.181646°E
02424		Domaine La Villanelle	Route de la Capite 39	503.120	119.260	46.217813°N 6.183094°E
02427		Domaine Mallet	Route de Vandoeuvres 13	502.810	118.260	46.208774°N 6.179285°E
02428		Eglise Saint-Paul	Avenue de Saint-Paul 6	502.510	117.560	46.202434°N 6.175545°E
02426	Le Manoir	Le Manoir	Place du Manoir 4	502.990	119.050	46.215905°N 6.181453°E
02429		Maison Pré-Picot	Plateau de Frontenex 11	502.600	117.820	46.204786°N 6.176656°E

== Confignon ==
KGS No.^{?}	Picture	Name	Street Address	CH1903 X coordinate	CH1903 Y coordinate	Location
02430		Eglise Saints-Pierre-et-Paul		495.425	114.510	46.173939°N 6.08445°E

== Dardagny ==
KGS No.^{?}	Picture	Name	Street Address	CH1903 X coordinate	CH1903 Y coordinate	Location
02432	Campagne Leleux	Campagne Leleux	Chemin de la Côte 35	488.580	117.180	46.196856°N 5.995196°E
02433		Chapelle de Malval		488.310	118.600	46.209582°N 5.991359°E
11811		Temple	Chemin de la Côte 2	488.580	116.950	46.194787°N 5.99525°E

== Genthod ==
KGS No.^{?}	Picture	Name	Street Address	CH1903 X coordinate	CH1903 Y coordinate	Location
02583		Campagne des Grands-Châtillons	Route de Malagny 12	501.280	124.720	46.266655°N 6.158098°E
02584		Campagne du Petit-Malagny	Route de Malagny 36	501.410	125.040	46.269552°N 6.159716°E
02586		Campagne Le Saugy	Rue du Village 2	501.130	124.260	46.262495°N 6.15625°E
02587		Campagne Marignac	Chemin des Rousses 11	500.935	123.985	46.259993°N 6.15378°E
02589		Presbytère	Rue du Village 9	501.120	124.340	46.263213°N 6.156103°E

== Gy ==
KGS No.^{?}	Picture	Name	Street Address	CH1903 X coordinate	CH1903 Y coordinate	Location
02591		Temple	Route de Gy 155	508.930	123.025	46.252488°N 6.257644°E

== Hermance ==
KGS No.^{?}	Picture	Name	Street Address	CH1903 X coordinate	CH1903 Y coordinate	Location
02593		Eglise Saint-Georges		508.000	128.475	46.301382°N 6.24451°E
02594	Tour et restes de l'enceinte	Tour et restes de l'enceinte	Rue du Couchant 15	508.080	128.410	46.300808°N 6.245561°E

== Jussy ==
KGS No.^{?}	Picture	Name	Street Address	CH1903 X coordinate	CH1903 Y coordinate	Location
02596		Campagne La Gara	Route de la Gara 30	508.880	121.560	46.239304°N 6.257282°E
02597		Temple	Route de Jussy 315	509.545	121.115	46.235391°N 6.265988°E

== Laconnex ==
KGS No.^{?}	Picture	Name	Street Address	CH1903 X coordinate	CH1903 Y coordinate	Location
02598		Maison forte	Rue de la Maison-Forte 16	491.670	112.660	46.156707°N 6.036264°E
10026		Maison paysanne	Route des Rupettes 16	491.570	112.640	46.156511°N 6.034974°E

== Lancy ==
KGS No.^{?}	Picture	Name	Street Address	CH1903 X coordinate	CH1903 Y coordinate	Location
02599		Château (mairie) et Pavillon Pictet-de-Rochemont	Route du Grand-Lancy 41	498.390	115.585	46.184061°N 6.122604°E
11821		Eglise Notre-Dame-des-Grâces	Avenues des Communes-Réunies 7	498.270	115.400	46.182379°N 6.121091°E

== Le Grand-Saconnex ==
KGS No.^{?}	Picture	Name	Street Address	CH1903 X coordinate	CH1903 Y coordinate	Location
02590		Eglise Saint-Hippolyte	Chemin Auguste-Vilbert 10	498.600	120.955	46.232392°N 6.124159°E

== Meinier ==
KGS No.^{?}	Picture	Name	Street Address	CH1903 X coordinate	CH1903 Y coordinate	Location
02600		Château de Merlinge	Route de Bellebouche 70	508.210	122.960	46.251806°N 6.248321°E
02601		Eglise Saint-Pierre	Route de Gy 42	507.110	122.400	46.246618°N 6.234171°E
02602		Ferme de Bellebouche	Route de Bellebouche 45	507.220	123.460	46.256167°N 6.235386°E

== Meyrin ==
KGS No.^{?}	Picture	Name	Street Address	CH1903 X coordinate	CH1903 Y coordinate	Location
02606		Eglise Saint-Julien	Route de Meyrin 301	494.530	120.620	46.228754°N 6.071485°E

== Onex ==
KGS No.^{?}	Picture	Name	Street Address	CH1903 X coordinate	CH1903 Y coordinate	Location
11822		Mairie	Chemin Charles-Borgeaud 27	496.780	115.325	46.181478°N 6.101814°E
02607		Maison Rochette	Chemin Gustave-Rochette 5	496.590	115.535	46.183338°N 6.099307°E

== Plan-les-Ouates ==
KGS No.^{?}	Picture	Name	Street Address	CH1903 X coordinate	CH1903 Y coordinate	Location
09099		Château	Route du Vélodrome 1	497.670	113.660	46.166638°N 6.113702°E
02610		Saconnex d'Arve, Campagne Montfalcon	Route de Saconnex-d'Arve 107	498.800	113.270	46.163301°N 6.128414°E
02611		Saconnex d'Arve, Maison de la Tour	Route de Saconnex-d'Arve 141	498.660	113.115	46.161886°N 6.126636°E
02612		Saconnex d'Arve, Tour de l'ancien château	Route de Saconnex-d'Arve 159	498.615	112.905	46.159991°N 6.126099°E

== Presinge ==
KGS No.^{?}	Picture	Name	Street Address	CH1903 X coordinate	CH1903 Y coordinate	Location
11826		Abbaye de Presinge	Route de Presinge 137	508.255	119.550	46.22114°N 6.249575°E
11824		Eglise Saint-Félix	Route de La-Louvière 12	508.680	119.300	46.21895°N 6.255131°E

== Russin ==
KGS No.^{?}	Picture	Name	Street Address	CH1903 X coordinate	CH1903 Y coordinate	Location
02619		Château Fazy avec dépendances	Chemin de la Croix-de-Plomb 26	489.980	115.980	46.186293°N 6.013611°E
02620	Temple et Presbytère	Temple et Presbytère	Chemin des Christophes 10	490.020	116.110	46.187469°N 6.014098°E

== Satigny ==
KGS No.^{?}	Picture	Name	Street Address	CH1903 X coordinate	CH1903 Y coordinate	Location
02624		Bourdigny, Château	Route de Bourdigny 71	491.985	120.610	46.22826°N 6.038505°E
02625		Campagne Le Saugey	Chemin du Bornalet 9	491.350	119.120	46.214757°N 6.030622°E
02626		Château des Bois et dépendances	Chemin de la Combe-d'Ornex 10	492.920	119.135	46.215143°N 6.05096°E
02627		Choully, Domaine Turrettini-Auriol	Route de Crédery 48	491.000	119.850	46.221266°N 6.025917°E
11827		Peissy, Clocher		409.655	118.710	46.19293°N 4.972651°E
02630		Peney, Temple	Chemin de Châteauvieux 18	491.970	117.655	46.20168°N 6.038993°E
02632		Temple et presbytère	Route de Champvigny 45	491.420	119.500	46.218186°N 6.03144°E

== Soral ==
KGS No.^{?}	Picture	Name	Street Address	CH1903 X coordinate	CH1903 Y coordinate	Location
02633		Eglise Saint-Pierre-aux-Liens	Route des Lolliets 3	492.160	111.330	46.144823°N 6.042912°E
02634		Fontaine couverte	Route de Rougemont 27	492.300	111.125	46.143002°N 6.04477°E

== Troinex ==
KGS No.^{?}	Picture	Name	Street Address	CH1903 X coordinate	CH1903 Y coordinate	Location
02637		Campagne Pictet	Route de Marsillon 43	500.770	113.330	46.164134°N 6.153902°E

== Vandoeuvres ==
KGS No.^{?}	Picture	Name	Street Address	CH1903 X coordinate	CH1903 Y coordinate	Location
02638		Chougny, Campagne de Chougny-Fontaine	Vandoeuvres 4	504.300	119.360	46.218881°N 6.198363°E
11829		Mairie de Vandoeuvres	Route de Vandoeuvres 104	504.460	119.505	46.220208°N 6.200407°E
02639		Temple	Place de Vandoeuvres 1	504.600	119.600	46.221082°N 6.202202°E
12746		Villa de Petit-Miolan	Chemin des Princes 80	505.636	120.109	46.225806°N 6.215524°E

== Vernier ==
KGS No.^{?}	Picture	Name	Street Address	CH1903 X coordinate	CH1903 Y coordinate	Location
02641		Pont Butin		497.495	117.700	46.202949°N 6.110551°E

== Versoix ==
KGS No.^{?}	Picture	Name	Street Address	CH1903 X coordinate	CH1903 Y coordinate	Location
11831		Aigues-Bleues, Mairie	Route de Suisse 16	502.235	125.740	46.275968°N 6.170269°E
11830		Chapelle d'Ecogia		500.705	127.375	46.29045°N 6.150075°E
11832		Domaine Lullin / Ami-Argand	Argand 103	501.850	126.875	46.286121°N 6.165037°E
02643		Domaine Port-Choiseul	Chemin du Vieux-Port 14	502.120	126.925	46.28661°N 6.168529°E
02646		Fleur d'Eau	Route de Suisse 154	502.000	127.310	46.290055°N 6.166891°E
02644		Maison Montfleury	Grand-Montfleury 48	501.820	127.650	46.293087°N 6.164484°E
02645		Versoix-la-Ville, éléments bâtis liés aux plans Choiseul-Querret		501.900	127.050	46.287702°N 6.165648°E

== Veyrier ==
KGS No.^{?}	Picture	Name	Street Address	CH1903 X coordinate	CH1903 Y coordinate	Location
10029		Ancienne usine de pompage à Vessy	Route de Vessy 49	502.065	114.965	46.179029°N 6.170323°E
02648		Eglise Saint-Maurice	Place de l'Eglise 20	503.270	113.885	46.169489°N 6.186149°E

== See also ==
List of cultural property of national significance in Switzerland: Geneva
