= Aire-la-Ville =

- Municipality
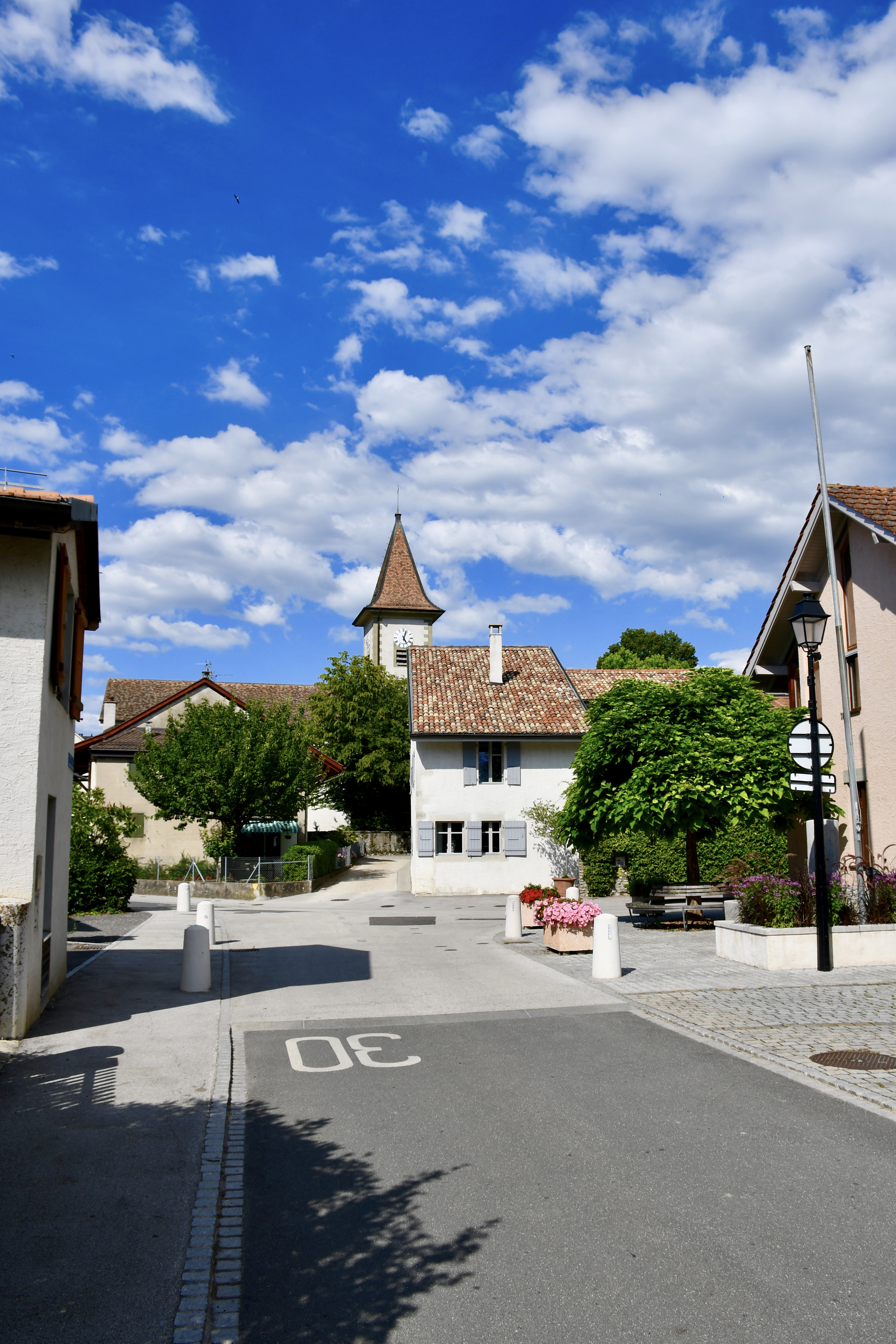
- Central Aire-la-Ville

- Flag Coat of arms
- Location of Aire-la-Ville
- Location within Switzerland Location within Canton of Geneva
- Coordinates: 46°11′N 6°2′E
- Country: Switzerland
- Canton: Geneva
- District: n.a.

Government
  - Mayor: Maire; Dominique Novelle

Area
  - Total: 2.93 km^{2} (1.13 sq mi)
- Elevation: 326 m (1,070 ft)

Population (December 2020)
  - Total: 1,160
  - Density: 396/km^{2} (1,030/sq mi)
- Demonym: Aériens
- Time zone: UTC+01:00 (CET)
  - Summer (DST): UTC+02:00 (CEST)
- Postal code: 1288
- SFOS number: 6601
- ISO 3166 code: CH-GE
- Surrounded by: Bernex, Cartigny, Russin, Satigny
- Website: www.aire-la-ville.ch

Aire-la-Ville is a municipality in the canton of Geneva in Switzerland.

== History ==
Aire-la-Ville is first mentioned in 1429 as Aeria Villa. In 1666 it was mentioned as Haire-la-Ville.

== Geography ==
Aerial view (1953)

Aire-la-Ville has an area, as of 2009, of 2.93 square kilometers (1.13 sq mi). Of this area, 1.21 km^{2} (0.47 sq mi) or 41.3% is used for agricultural purposes, while 0.67 km^{2} (0.26 sq mi) or 22.9% is forested. Of the rest of the land, 0.58 km^{2} (0.22 sq mi) or 19.8% is settled (buildings or roads), 0.41 km^{2} (0.16 sq mi) or 14.0% is either rivers or lakes and 0.01 km^{2} (2.5 acres) or 0.3% is unproductive land.

Of the built up area, housing and buildings made up 8.2% and transportation infrastructure made up 5.5%. Power and water infrastructure as well as other special developed areas made up 4.8% of the area Out of the forested land, 21.2% of the total land area is heavily forested and 1.7% is covered with orchards or small clusters of trees. Of the agricultural land, 35.8% is used for growing crops and 4.4% is pastures. All the water in the municipality is flowing water.

The village is located on the left bank of the Rhône, at the same position as the Verbois dam. The Cheneviers incineration plant is located within the community limits.

The municipality of Aire-la-Ville consists of the sub-sections or villages of Treulaz, Cheneviers, Vieux-Four and La Fin.

== Demographics ==
Largest groups of foreign residents 2013
Nationality	Amount	% total (population)
France	54	4.8
Portugal	26	2.3
Italy	22	2.0
Spain	17	1.5
UK	13	1.2
Sweden	8	0.7
Hungary	8	0.7
Germany	6	0.5
Philippines	5	0.4
Belgium	4	0.3

Aire-la-Ville has a population (as of December 2020) of 1,160. As of 2008, 20.3% of the population are resident foreign nationals. Over the last 10 years (1999–2009 ) the population has changed at a rate of 54%. It has changed at a rate of 44.8% due to migration and at a rate of 9.7% due to births and deaths.

Most of the population (as of 2000) speaks French (625 or 84.9%), with English being second most common (27 or 3.7%) and German being third (25 or 3.4%). There are 2 people who speak Romansh.

As of 2008, the gender distribution of the population was 50.4% male and 49.6% female. The population was made up of 471 Swiss men (40.9% of the population) and 110 (9.5%) non-Swiss men. There were 462 Swiss women (40.1%) and 109 (9.5%) non-Swiss women. Of the population in the municipality 174 or about 23.6% were born in Aire-la-Ville and lived there in 2000. There were 252 or 34.2% who were born in the same canton, while 104 or 14.1% were born somewhere else in Switzerland, and 171 or 23.2% were born outside of Switzerland.

In 2008 there were 9 live births to Swiss citizens and 2 births to non-Swiss citizens, and in same time span there were 2 deaths of Swiss citizens and 1 non-Swiss citizen death. Ignoring immigration and emigration, the population of Swiss citizens increased by 7 while the foreign population increased by 1. There were 4 Swiss men and 2 Swiss women who emigrated from Switzerland. At the same time, there was 1 non-Swiss man and 1 non-Swiss woman who immigrated from another country to Switzerland. The total Swiss population change in 2008 (from all sources, including moves across municipal borders) was an increase of 39 and the non-Swiss population decreased by 12 people. This represents a population growth rate of 2.5%.

The age distribution of the population (as of 2000) is children and teenagers (0–19 years old) make up 30.3% of the population, while adults (20–64 years old) make up 62.2% and seniors (over 64 years old) make up 7.5%.

As of 2000, there were 320 people who were single and never married in the municipality. There were 359 married individuals, 22 widows or widowers and 35 individuals who are divorced.

As of 2000, there were 261 private households in the municipality, and an average of 2.7 persons per household. There were 64 households that consist of only one person and 28 households with five or more people. Out of a total of 268 households that answered this question, 23.9% were households made up of just one person. Of the rest of the households, there are 64 married couples without children, 109 married couples with children There were 22 single parents with a child or children. There were 2 households that were made up of unrelated people and 7 households that were made up of some sort of institution or another collective housing.

In 2000 there were 149 single family homes (or 75.3% of the total) out of a total of 198 inhabited buildings. There were 25 multi-family buildings (12.6%), along with 16 multi-purpose buildings that were mostly used for housing (8.1%) and 8 other use buildings (commercial or industrial) that also had some housing (4.0%). Of the single family homes 25 were built before 1919, while 26 were built between 1990 and 2000. The greatest number of single family homes (45) were built between 1971 and 1980.

In 2000 there were 270 apartments in the municipality. The most common apartment size was 4 rooms of which there were 91. There were 7 single room apartments and 92 apartments with five or more rooms. Of these apartments, a total of 250 apartments (92.6% of the total) were permanently occupied, while 16 apartments (5.9%) were seasonally occupied and 4 apartments (1.5%) were empty. As of 2009, the construction rate of new housing units was 0 new units per 1000 residents. The vacancy rate for the municipality, in 2010, was 0.25%.

The historical population is given in the following chart:

== Politics ==
In the 2007 federal election the most popular party was the SVP which received 25.22% of the vote. The next three most popular parties were the CVP (19.71%), the Green Party (13.08%) and the FDP (11.88%). In the federal election, a total of 333 votes were cast, and the voter turnout was 55.8%.

In the 2009 Grand Conseil election, there were a total of 656 registered voters of which 310 (47.3%) voted. The most popular party in the municipality for this election was the MCG with 17.0% of the ballots. In the canton-wide election they received the third highest proportion of votes. The second most popular party was the PDC (with 15.4%), they were fifth in the canton-wide election, while the third most popular party was the Les Radicaux (with 13.1%), they were sixth in the canton-wide election.

For the 2009 Conseil d'État election, there were a total of 660 registered voters of which 383 (58.0%) voted.

In 2011, all the municipalities held local elections, and in Aire-la-Ville there were 13 spots open on the municipal council. There were a total of 790 registered voters of which 424 (53.7%) voted. Out of the 424 votes, there were 8 null or unreadable votes and 53 votes with a name that was not on the list.

== Economy ==
As of 2010, Aire-la-Ville had an unemployment rate of 7.6%. As of 2008, there were 6 people employed in the primary economic sector and about 3 businesses involved in this sector. 152 people were employed in the secondary sector and there were 9 businesses in this sector. 20 people were employed in the tertiary sector, with 7 businesses in this sector. There were 373 residents of the municipality who were employed in some capacity, of which females made up 42.1% of the workforce.

In 2008 the total number of full-time equivalent jobs was 175. The number of jobs in the primary sector was 5, all of which were in agriculture. The number of jobs in the secondary sector was 151 of which 2 or (1.3%) were in manufacturing and 13 (8.6%) were in construction. The number of jobs in the tertiary sector was 19. In the tertiary sector; 5 or 26.3% were in wholesale or retail sales or the repair of motor vehicles, 8 or 42.1% were in a hotel or restaurant, 1 was in the information industry, 5 or 26.3% were in education.

In 2000, there were 189 workers who commuted into the municipality and 322 workers who commuted away. The municipality is a net exporter of workers, with about 1.7 workers leaving the municipality for every one entering. About 2.1% of the workforce coming into Aire-la-Ville are coming from outside Switzerland. Of the working population, 10.7% used public transportation to get to work, and 72.7% used a private car.

== Religion ==
From the 2000 census, 357 or 48.5% were Roman Catholic, while 142 or 19.3% belonged to the Swiss Reformed Church. Of the rest of the population, there were 4 members of an Orthodox church (or about 0.54% of the population), and there were 5 individuals (or about 0.68% of the population) who belonged to another Christian church. There were 2 individuals (or about 0.27% of the population) who were Jewish, and there was 1 individual who was Islamic. There were 3 individuals who were Buddhist and 1 individual who belonged to another church. 162 (or about 22.01% of the population) belonged to no church, are agnostic or atheist, and 59 individuals (or about 8.02% of the population) did not answer the question.

== Education ==
In Aire-la-Ville about 225 or (30.6%) of the population have completed non-mandatory upper secondary education, and 158 or (21.5%) have completed additional higher education (either university or a Fachhochschule). Of the 158 who completed tertiary schooling, 46.2% were Swiss men, 30.4% were Swiss women, 13.3% were non-Swiss men and 10.1% were non-Swiss women.

During the 2009-2010 school year there were a total of 259 students in the Aire-la-Ville school system. The education system in the Canton of Geneva allows young children to attend two years of non-obligatory Kindergarten. During that school year, there were 32 children who were too young for kindergarten. The canton's school system provides two years of non-mandatory kindergarten and requires students to attend six years of primary school, with some of the children attending smaller, specialized classes. In Aire-la-Ville there were 32 students in kindergarten or primary school and 6 students were in the special, smaller classes. The secondary school program consists of three lower, obligatory years of schooling, followed by three to five years of optional, advanced schools. There were 32 lower secondary students who attended school in Aire-la-Ville. There were 70 upper secondary students from the municipality along with 6 students who were in a professional, non-university track program. An additional 19 students attended a private school.

As of 2000, there were 3 students in Aire-la-Ville who came from another municipality, while 82 residents attended schools outside the municipality.
