= Laconnex =

- Municipality
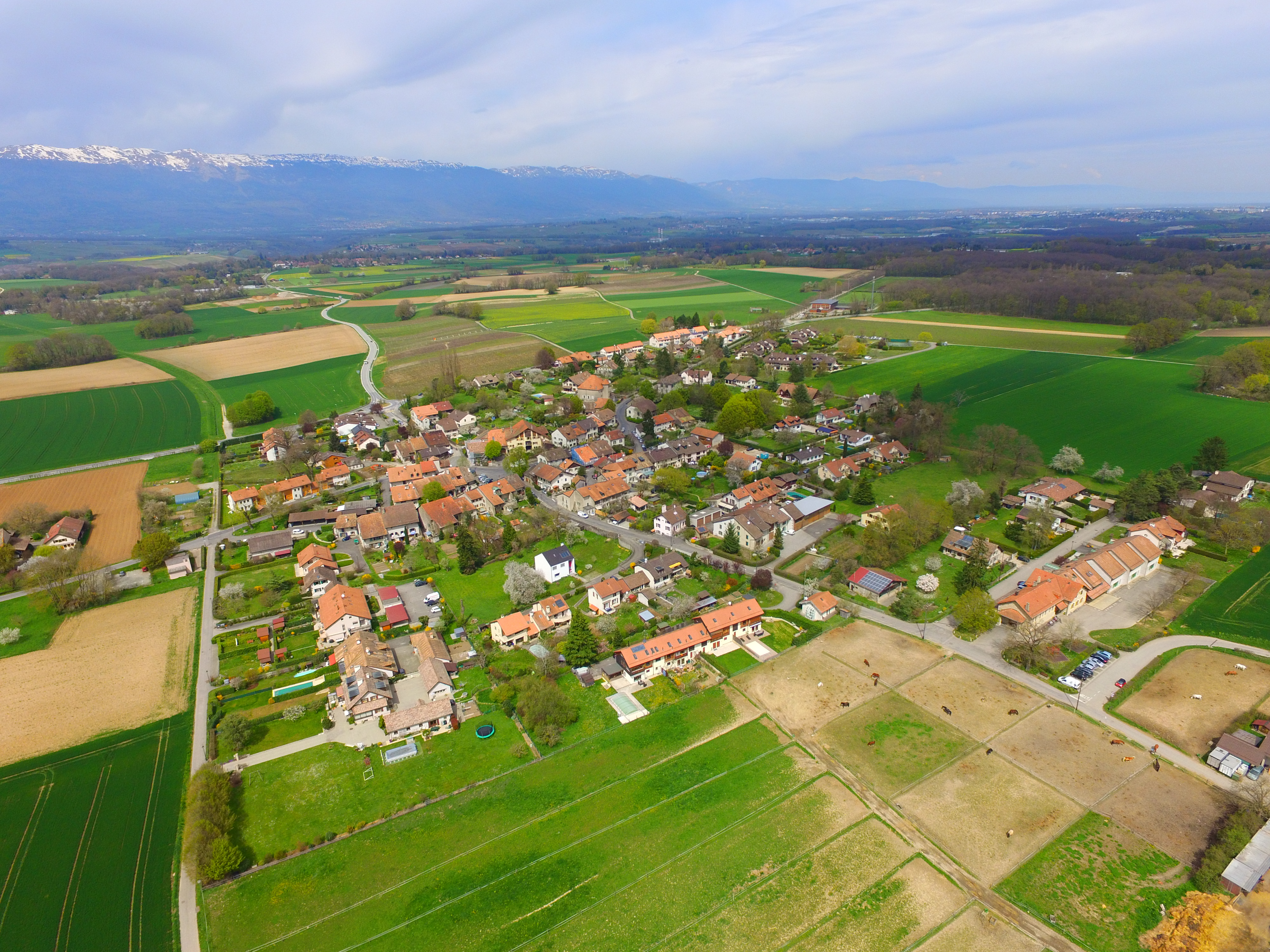
- Laconnex, aerial view

- Flag Coat of arms
- Location of Laconnex
- Location within Switzerland Location within Canton of Geneva
- Coordinates: 46°09′N 06°02′E
- Country: Switzerland
- Canton: Geneva
- District: n.a.

Government
  - Mayor: Maire; Hubert Dethurens

Area
  - Total: 3.83 km^{2} (1.48 sq mi)
- Elevation: 440 m (1,440 ft)

Population (December 2020)
  - Total: 710
  - Density: 190/km^{2} (480/sq mi)
- Time zone: UTC+01:00 (CET)
  - Summer (DST): UTC+02:00 (CEST)
- Postal code: 1287
- SFOS number: 6627
- ISO 3166 code: CH-GE
- Surrounded by: Avully, Avusy, Bernex, Cartigny, Soral
- Website: www.laconnex.ch

Laconnex (French pronunciation: [lakɔnɛ]) is a municipality of the Canton of Geneva, Switzerland.

== History ==
Laconnex is first mentioned in 1225 as Laconay. In 1231 it was mentioned as Lacunay.

== Geography ==
Laconnex has an area, as of 2009, of 3.83 square kilometers (1.48 sq mi). Of this area, 3.06 km^{2} (1.18 sq mi) or 79.9% is used for agricultural purposes, while 0.34 km^{2} (0.13 sq mi) or 8.9% is forested. Of the rest of the land, 0.4 km^{2} (0.15 sq mi) or 10.4% is settled (buildings or roads) and 0.03 km^{2} (7.4 acres) or 0.8% is unproductive land.

Of the built up area, housing and buildings made up 3.7% and transportation infrastructure made up 4.2%. Power and water infrastructure as well as other special developed areas made up 1.3% of the area while parks, green belts and sports fields made up 1.3%. Out of the forested land, 6.5% of the total land area is heavily forested and 2.3% is covered with orchards or small clusters of trees. Of the agricultural land, 67.1% is used for growing crops and 5.2% is pastures, while 7.6% is used for orchards or vine crops.

The municipality is located in the Swiss Champagne valley.

The municipality of Laconnex consists of the sub-sections or villages of Les Allues, La Grenouillère and Laconnex - village.

== Demographics ==
Largest groups of foreign residents 2013
Nationality	Amount	% total (population)
UK	25	4.1
France	21	3.5
Spain	7	1.2
Poland	6	1.0
Ireland	5	0.8

Laconnex has a population (as of December 2020) of 710. As of 2008, 17.2% of the population are resident foreign nationals. Over the last 10 years (1999–2009 ) the population has changed at a rate of 15.5%. It has changed at a rate of 10% due to migration and at a rate of 5.5% due to births and deaths.

Most of the population (as of 2000) speaks French (465 or 86.1%), with German being second most common (26 or 4.8%) and English being third (16 or 3.0%). There are 6 people who speak Italian.

As of 2008, the gender distribution of the population was 49.1% male and 50.9% female. The population was made up of 249 Swiss men (40.2% of the population) and 55 (8.9%) non-Swiss men. There were 270 Swiss women (43.6%) and 45 (7.3%) non-Swiss women. Of the population in the municipality 134 or about 24.8% were born in Laconnex and lived there in 2000. There were 178 or 33.0% who were born in the same canton, while 75 or 13.9% were born somewhere else in Switzerland, and 139 or 25.7% were born outside of Switzerland.

In 2008 there were 2 live births to Swiss citizens and 2 births to non-Swiss citizens, and in the same time span there were 5 deaths of Swiss citizens. Ignoring immigration and emigration, the population of Swiss citizens decreased by 3 while the foreign population increased by 2. There was 1 Swiss woman who immigrated back to Switzerland. At the same time, there were 3 non-Swiss men and 5 non-Swiss women who immigrated from another country to Switzerland. The total Swiss population change in 2008 (from all sources, including moves across municipal borders) was a decrease of 2 and the non-Swiss population increased by 6 people. This represents a population growth rate of 0.6%.

The age distribution of the population (as of 2000) is children and teenagers (0–19 years old) make up 25.7% of the population, while adults (20–64 years old) make up 63.7% and seniors (over 64 years old) make up 10.6%.

As of 2000, there were 218 people who were single and never married in the municipality. There were 283 married individuals, 16 widows or widowers and 23 individuals who are divorced.

As of 2000, there were 198 private households in the municipality, and an average of 2.7 persons per household. There were 47 households that consist of only one person and 21 households with five or more people. Out of a total of 205 households that answered this question, 22.9% were households made up of just one person. Of the rest of the households, there are 48 married couples without children, 89 married couples with children There were 10 single parents with a child or children. There were 4 households that were made up of unrelated people and 7 households that were made up of some sort of institution or another collective housing.

In 2000 there were 107 single family homes (or 74.3% of the total) out of a total of 144 inhabited buildings. There were 14 multi-family buildings (9.7%), along with 18 multi-purpose buildings that were mostly used for housing (12.5%) and 5 other use buildings (commercial or industrial) that also had some housing (3.5%). Of the single family homes 38 were built before 1919, while 12 were built between 1990 and 2000.

In 2000 there were 183 apartments in the municipality. The most common apartment size was 4 rooms of which there were 48. There were 4 single room apartments and 92 apartments with five or more rooms. Of these apartments, a total of 172 apartments (94.0% of the total) were permanently occupied, while 10 apartments (5.5%) were seasonally occupied and 1 apartments (0.5%) were empty. As of 2009, the construction rate of new housing units was 0 new units per 1000 residents. The vacancy rate for the municipality, in 2010, was 0.44%.

The historical population is given in the following chart:

== Politics ==
In the 2007 federal election the most popular party was the CVP which received 22.9% of the vote. The next three most popular parties were the LPS Party (17.21%), the SVP (15.81%) and the SVP (15.81%). In the federal election, a total of 255 votes were cast, and the voter turnout was 63.1%.

In the 2009 Grand Conseil election, there were a total of 401 registered voters of which 219 (54.6%) voted. The most popular party in the municipality for this election was the PDC with 22.1% of the ballots. In the canton-wide election they received the fifth highest proportion of votes. The second most popular party was the Les Verts (with 18.8%), they were also second in the canton-wide election, while the third most popular party was the Libéral (with 17.8%), they were first in the canton-wide election.

For the 2009 Conseil d'Etat election, there were a total of 402 registered voters of which 264 (65.7%) voted.

In 2011, all the municipalities held local elections, and in Laconnex there were 11 spots open on the municipal council. There were a total of 448 registered voters of which 255 (56.9%) voted. Out of the 255 votes, there were 6 blank votes, 8 votes with a name that was not on the list.

== Economy ==
As of 2010, Laconnex had an unemployment rate of 3%. As of 2008, there were 33 people employed in the primary economic sector and about 8 businesses involved in this sector. 21 people were employed in the secondary sector and there were 7 businesses in this sector. 38 people were employed in the tertiary sector, with 14 businesses in this sector. There were 275 residents of the municipality who were employed in some capacity, of which females made up 45.1% of the workforce.

In 2008 the total number of full-time equivalent jobs was 74. The number of jobs in the primary sector was 19, all of which were in agriculture. The number of jobs in the secondary sector was 21 of which 5 or (23.8%) were in manufacturing and 16 (76.2%) were in construction. The number of jobs in the tertiary sector was 34. In the tertiary sector; 5 or 14.7% were in wholesale or retail sales or the repair of motor vehicles, 8 or 23.5% were in a hotel or restaurant, 2 or 5.9% were in the information industry, 1 was the insurance or financial industry, 2 or 5.9% were technical professionals or scientists, 3 or 8.8% were in education and 1 was in health care.

In 2000, there were 39 workers who commuted into the municipality and 229 workers who commuted away. The municipality is a net exporter of workers, with about 5.9 workers leaving the municipality for every one entering. About 28.2% of the workforce coming into Laconnex are coming from outside Switzerland, while 0.0% of the locals commute out of Switzerland for work. Of the working population, 9.8% used public transportation to get to work, and 73.5% used a private car.

== Religion ==
From the 2000 census, 241 or 44.6% were Roman Catholic, while 107 or 19.8% belonged to the Swiss Reformed Church. Of the rest of the population, there were 3 members of an Orthodox church (or about 0.56% of the population), there were 2 individuals (or about 0.37% of the population) who belonged to the Christian Catholic Church, and there were 8 individuals (or about 1.48% of the population) who belonged to another Christian church. There were 2 individuals (or about 0.37% of the population) who were Jewish, and There were 2 individuals who were Buddhist. 151 (or about 27.96% of the population) belonged to no church, are agnostic or atheist, and 24 individuals (or about 4.44% of the population) did not answer the question.

== Education ==
In Laconnex about 184 or (34.1%) of the population have completed non-mandatory upper secondary education, and 136 or (25.2%) have completed additional higher education (either university or a Fachhochschule). Of the 136 who completed tertiary schooling, 39.7% were Swiss men, 34.6% were Swiss women, 15.4% were non-Swiss men and 10.3% were non-Swiss women.

During the 2009-2010 school year there were a total of 137 students in the Laconnex school system. The education system in the Canton of Geneva allows young children to attend two years of non-obligatory Kindergarten. During that school year, there were 8 children who were in a pre-kindergarten class. The canton's school system provides two years of non-mandatory kindergarten and requires students to attend six years of primary school, with some of the children attending smaller, specialized classes. In Laconnex there were 24 students in kindergarten or primary school and 2 students were in the special, smaller classes. The secondary school program consists of three lower, obligatory years of schooling, followed by three to five years of optional, advanced schools. There were 24 lower secondary students who attended school in Laconnex. There were 39 upper secondary students from the municipality along with 6 students who were in a professional, non-university track program. An additional 14 students attended a private school.

As of 2000, there were 28 students in Laconnex who came from another municipality, while 90 residents attended schools outside the municipality.
