= Cartigny, Switzerland =

Cartigny
- Municipality
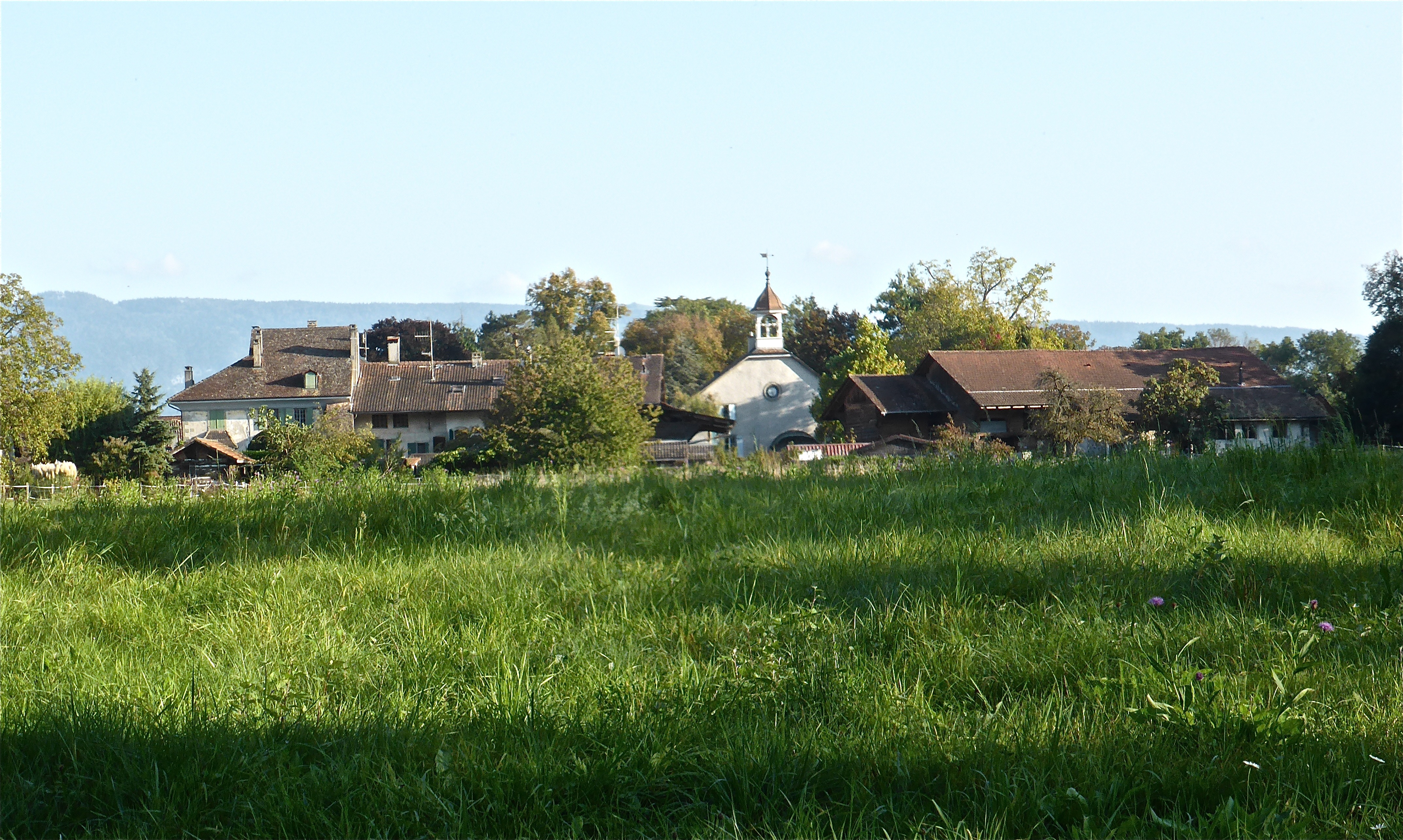

- Flag Coat of arms
- Location of Cartigny
- Location within Switzerland Location within Canton of Geneva
- Coordinates: 46°10′N 06°01′E
- Country: Switzerland
- Canton: Geneva
- District: n.a.

Government
  - Mayor: Maire; Carine Zach

Area
  - Total: 4.38 km^{2} (1.69 sq mi)
- Elevation: 430 m (1,410 ft)

Population (December 2020)
  - Total: 971
  - Density: 222/km^{2} (574/sq mi)
- Time zone: UTC+01:00 (CET)
  - Summer (DST): UTC+02:00 (CEST)
- Postal code: 1236
- SFOS number: 6609
- ISO 3166 code: CH-GE
- Surrounded by: Aire-la-Ville, Avully, Avusy, Bernex, Laconnex, Russin
- Website: www.cartigny.ch

Cartigny is a municipality of the Canton of Geneva, Switzerland.

== History ==
Cartigny is first mentioned in 1220 as Cartiniacum and Quartinie.

== Geography ==
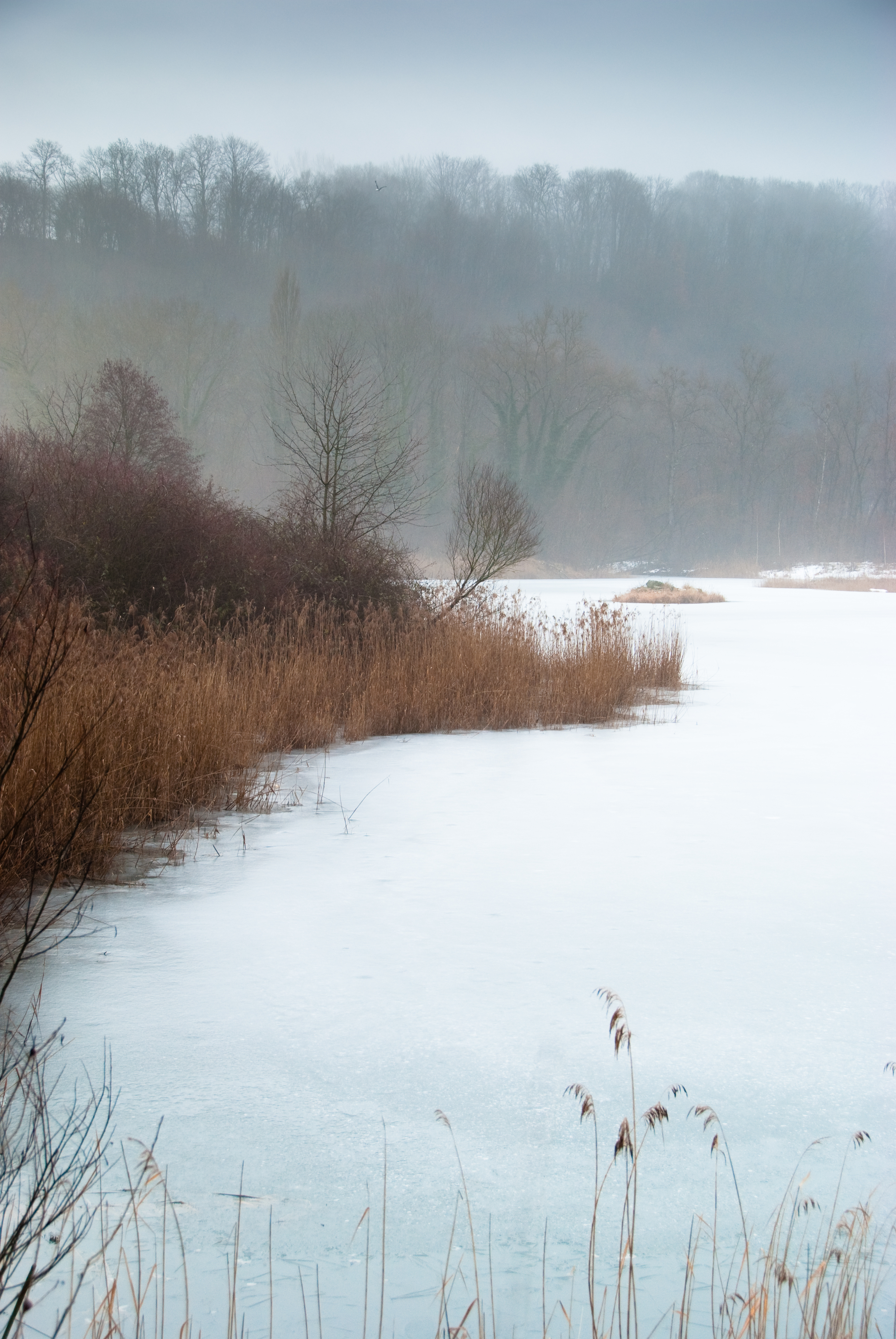
Lake outside of Cartigny

Cartigny has an area, as of 2009, of 4.38 square kilometers (1.69 sq mi). Of this area, 2.43 km^{2} (0.94 sq mi) or 55.5% is used for agricultural purposes, while 1.28 km^{2} (0.49 sq mi) or 29.2% is forested. Of the rest of the land, 0.5 km^{2} (0.19 sq mi) or 11.4% is settled (buildings or roads), 0.13 km^{2} (32 acres) or 3.0% is either rivers or lakes and 0.07 km^{2} (17 acres) or 1.6% is unproductive land.

Of the built up area, housing and buildings made up 7.1% and transportation infrastructure made up 3.2%. Out of the forested land, 23.5% of the total land area is heavily forested and 5.7% is covered with orchards or small clusters of trees. Of the agricultural land, 37.0% is used for growing crops and 12.3% is pastures, while 6.2% is used for orchards or vine crops. Of the water in the municipality, 1.1% is in lakes and 1.8% is in rivers and streams.

The municipality is located in the center of the Swiss Champagne valley. It consists of the villages of Cartigny and La Petite Grave.

The municipality of Cartigny consists of the sub-sections or villages of Nant des Crues, Moulin-de-Vert, Longemalle, La Petite-Grave and Bois-de-Saint-Victor .

== Demographics ==
Largest groups of foreign residents, 2013
Nationality	Amount	% total (population)
UK	47	5.4
France	45	5.2
Portugal	16	1.8
Italy	14	1.3
Spain	10	1.2

Cartigny has a population (as of December 2020) of 971. As of 2008, 22.7% of the population are resident foreign nationals. Over the last 10 years (1999–2009 ) the population has changed at a rate of 11.3%. It has changed at a rate of 3.7% due to migration and at a rate of 8.3% due to births and deaths.

Most of the population (as of 2000) speaks French (632 or 84.5%), with English being second most common (51 or 6.8%) and German being third (23 or 3.1%).

As of 2008, the gender distribution of the population was 49.1% male and 50.9% female. The population was made up of 314 Swiss men (36.9% of the population) and 104 (12.2%) non-Swiss men. There were 338 Swiss women (39.7%) and 95 (11.2%) non-Swiss women. Of the population in the municipality 180 or about 24.1% were born in Cartigny and lived there in 2000. There were 239 or 32.0% who were born in the same canton, while 118 or 15.8% were born somewhere else in Switzerland, and 185 or 24.7% were born outside of Switzerland.

In 2008 there were 5 live births to Swiss citizens and 2 births to non-Swiss citizens, and in same time span there were 5 deaths of Swiss citizens. Ignoring immigration and emigration, the population of Swiss citizens remained the same while the foreign population increased by 2. There were 3 Swiss men who emigrated from Switzerland. At the same time, there were 10 non-Swiss men and 5 non-Swiss women who immigrated from another country to Switzerland. The total Swiss population change in 2008 (from all sources, including moves across municipal borders) was an increase of 3 and the non-Swiss population increased by 14 people. This represents a population growth rate of 2.2%.

The age distribution of the population (as of 2000) is children and teenagers (0–19 years old) make up 24.1% of the population, while adults (20–64 years old) make up 61.6% and seniors (over 64 years old) make up 14.3%.

As of 2000, there were 303 people who were single and never married in the municipality. There were 376 married individuals, 25 widows or widowers and 44 individuals who are divorced.

As of 2000, there were 298 private households in the municipality, and an average of 2.4 persons per household. There were 84 households that consist of only one person and 22 households with five or more people. Out of a total of 307 households that answered this question, 27.4% were households made up of just one person and there were 1 adults who lived with their parents. Of the rest of the households, there are 89 married couples without children, 103 married couples with children There were 16 single parents with a child or children. There were 5 households that were made up of unrelated people and 9 households that were made up of some sort of institution or another collective housing.

In 2000 there were 133 single family homes (or 63.0% of the total) out of a total of 211 inhabited buildings. There were 48 multi-family buildings (22.7%), along with 21 multi-purpose buildings that were mostly used for housing (10.0%) and 9 other use buildings (commercial or industrial) that also had some housing (4.3%). Of the single family homes 59 were built before 1919, while 8 were built between 1990 and 2000.

In 2000 there were 336 apartments in the municipality. The most common apartment size was 4 rooms of which there were 82. There were 24 single room apartments and 133 apartments with five or more rooms. Of these apartments, a total of 282 apartments (83.9% of the total) were permanently occupied, while 44 apartments (13.1%) were seasonally occupied and 10 apartments (3.0%) were empty. As of 2009, the construction rate of new housing units was 1.2 new units per 1000 residents. The vacancy rate for the municipality, in 2010, was 0%.

The historical population is given in the following chart:

== Sights ==
The entire village of Cartigny is designated as part of the Inventory of Swiss Heritage Sites.

== Politics ==
In the 2007 federal election the most popular party was the LPS Party which received 22.55% of the vote. The next three most popular parties were the SP (16.26%), the Green Party (15.41%) and the SVP (14.44%). In the federal election, a total of 316 votes were cast, and the voter turnout was 64.2%.

In the 2009 Grand Conseil election, there were a total of 518 registered voters of which 289 (55.8%) voted. The most popular party in the municipality for this election was the Libéral with 24.4% of the ballots. In the canton-wide election they received the highest proportion of votes. The second most popular party was the Les Verts (with 14.6%), they were also second in the canton-wide election, while the third most popular party was the Les Socialistes (with 12.9%), they were fourth in the canton-wide election.

For the 2009 Conseil d'Etat election, there were a total of 517 registered voters of which 342 (66.2%) voted.

== Economy ==
As of 2010, Cartigny had an unemployment rate of 2.3%. As of 2008, there were 32 people employed in the primary economic sector and about 11 businesses involved in this sector. 79 people were employed in the secondary sector and there were 11 businesses in this sector. 161 people were employed in the tertiary sector, with 25 businesses in this sector. There were 391 residents of the municipality who were employed in some capacity, of which females made up 43.5% of the workforce.

In 2008 the total number of full-time equivalent jobs was 244. The number of jobs in the primary sector was 22, of which 17 were in agriculture and 5 were in forestry or lumber production. The number of jobs in the secondary sector was 77 of which 21 or (27.3%) were in manufacturing and 56 (72.7%) were in construction. The number of jobs in the tertiary sector was 145. In the tertiary sector; 18 or 12.4% were in wholesale or retail sales or the repair of motor vehicles, 16 or 11.0% were in a hotel or restaurant, 1 was in the information industry, 8 or 5.5% were technical professionals or scientists, 4 or 2.8% were in education and 1 was in health care.

In 2000, there were 144 workers who commuted into the municipality and 310 workers who commuted away. The municipality is a net exporter of workers, with about 2.2 workers leaving the municipality for every one entering. About 17.4% of the workforce coming into Cartigny are coming from outside Switzerland. Of the working population, 11.5% used public transportation to get to work, and 68% used a private car.

== Religion ==
From the 2000 census, 218 or 29.1% were Roman Catholic, while 276 or 36.9% belonged to the Swiss Reformed Church. Of the rest of the population, there were 2 members of an Orthodox church (or about 0.27% of the population), and there were 13 individuals (or about 1.74% of the population) who belonged to another Christian church. There were 2 individuals (or about 0.27% of the population) who were Jewish, and 3 (or about 0.40% of the population) who were Islamic. There was 1 person who was Buddhist, 1 person who was Hindu and 1 individual who belonged to another church. 188 (or about 25.13% of the population) belonged to no church, are agnostic or atheist, and 43 individuals (or about 5.75% of the population) did not answer the question.

== Education ==
In Cartigny about 265 or (35.4%) of the population have completed non-mandatory upper secondary education, and 208 or (27.8%) have completed additional higher education (either university or a Fachhochschule). Of the 208 who completed tertiary schooling, 39.9% were Swiss men, 34.6% were Swiss women, 13.0% were non-Swiss men and 12.5% were non-Swiss women.

During the 2009-2010 school year there were a total of 201 students in the Cartigny school system. The education system in the Canton of Geneva allows young children to attend two years of non-obligatory Kindergarten. During that school year, there were 16 children who were in a pre-kindergarten class. The canton's school system provides two years of non-mandatory kindergarten and requires students to attend six years of primary school, with some of the children attending smaller, specialized classes. In Cartigny there were 24 students in kindergarten or primary school and - students were in the special, smaller classes. The secondary school program consists of three lower, obligatory years of schooling, followed by three to five years of optional, advanced schools. There were 24 lower secondary students who attended school in Cartigny. There were 49 upper secondary students from the municipality along with 8 students who were in a professional, non-university track program. An additional 32 students attended a private school.

As of 2000, there were 6 students in Cartigny who came from another municipality, while 76 residents attended schools outside the municipality.
