= Chancy =

- Municipality
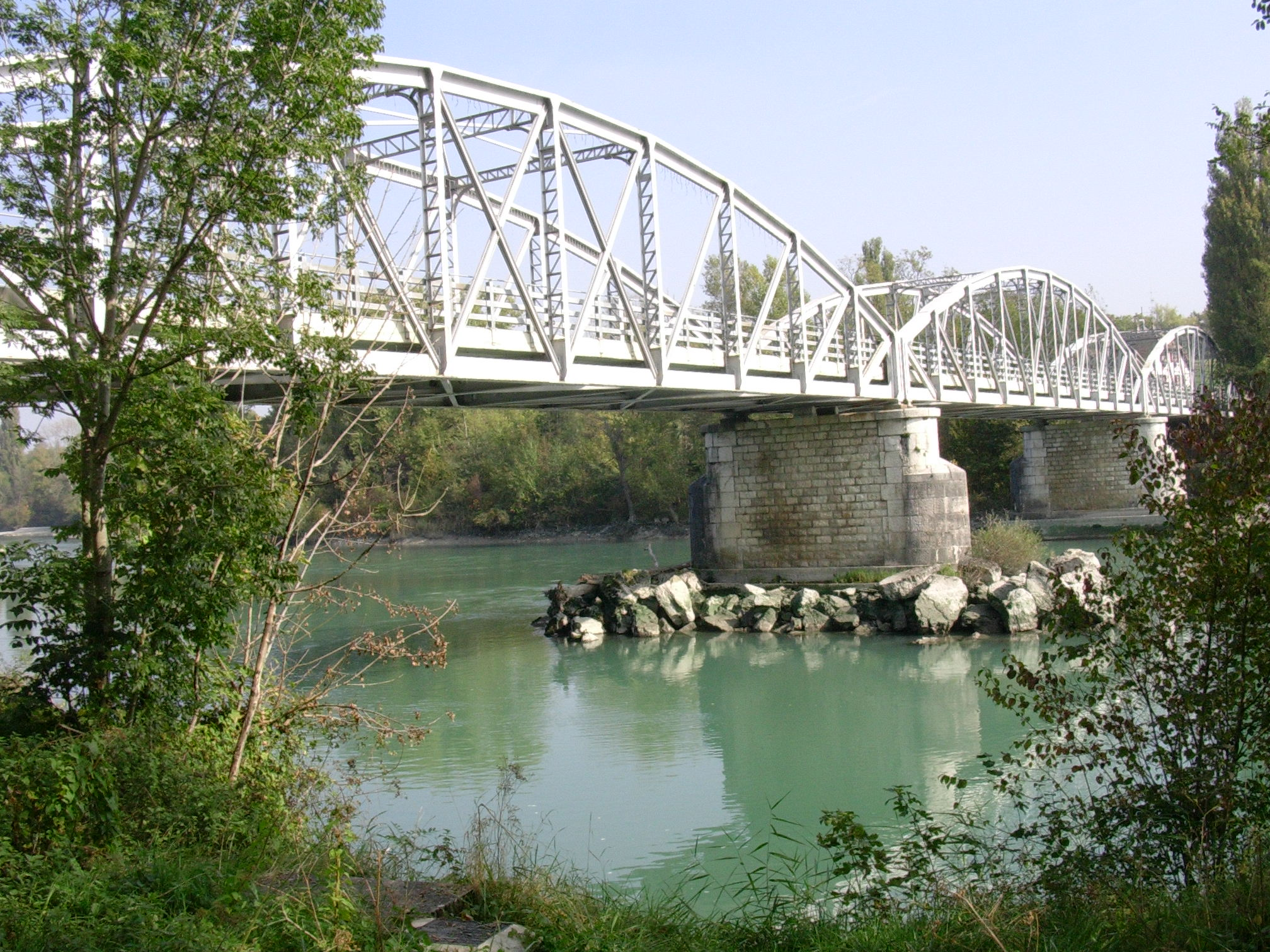

- Flag Coat of arms
- Location of Chancy
- Location within Switzerland Location within Canton of Geneva
- Coordinates: 46°09′N 5°58′E
- Country: Switzerland
- Canton: Geneva
- District: n.a.

Government
  - Mayor: Maire; Patrick Bouvier

Area
  - Total: 5.36 km^{2} (2.07 sq mi)
- Elevation: 427 m (1,401 ft)

Population (December 2020)
  - Total: 1,708
  - Density: 319/km^{2} (825/sq mi)
- Time zone: UTC+01:00 (CET)
  - Summer (DST): UTC+02:00 (CEST)
- Postal code: 1284
- SFOS number: 6611
- ISO 3166 code: CH-GE
- Surrounded by: Avully, Avusy, Challex (FR-01), Pougny (FR-01), Valleiry (FR-74), Viry (FR-74), Vulbens (FR-74)
- Website: www.chancy.ch

Chancy (French pronunciation: [ʃɑ̃si]) is a municipality of the canton of Geneva, Switzerland. The westernmost point of the country is located there.

== History ==
Chancy is first mentioned in 1240 as Chancie.

== Geography ==
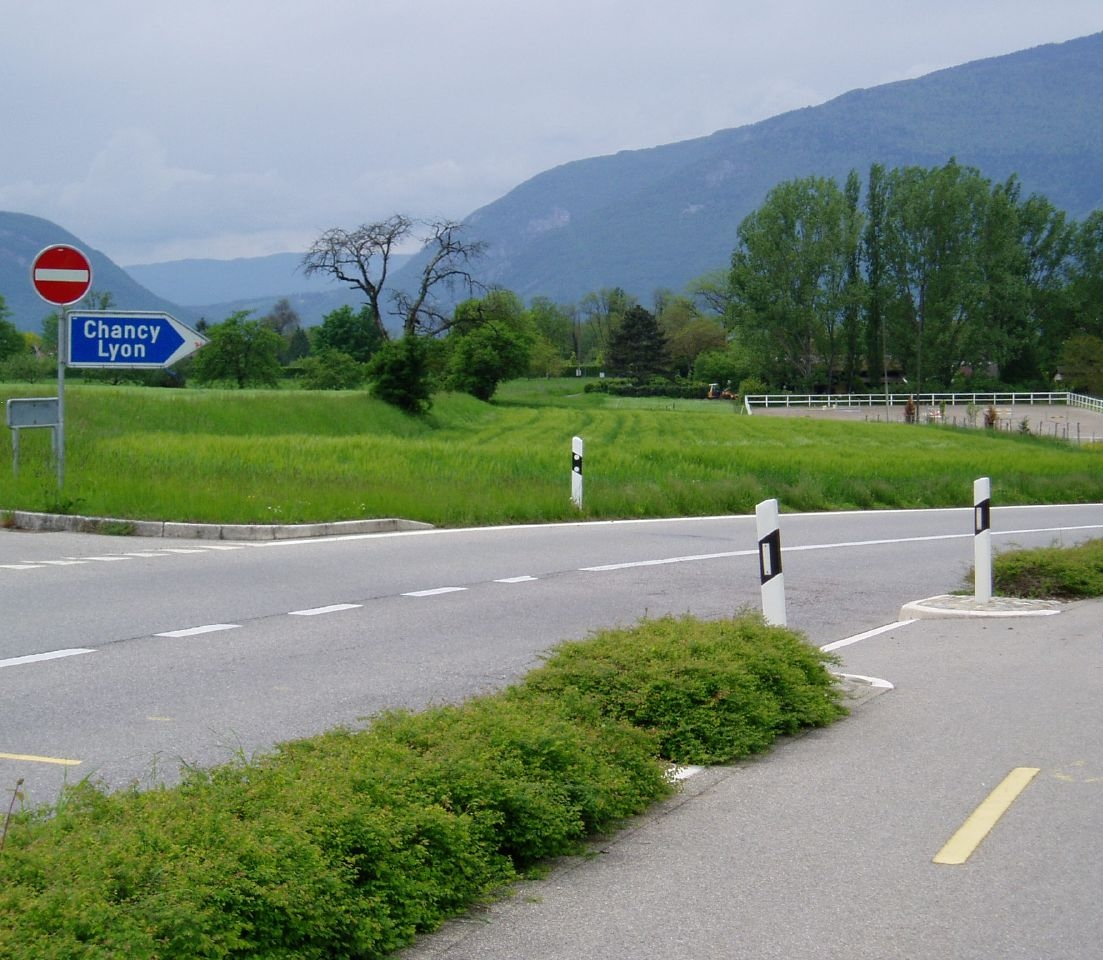
Countryside near Chancy

Chancy has an area, as of 2009, of 5.36 square kilometers (2.07 sq mi). Of this area, 2.8 km^{2} (1.1 sq mi) or 52.2% is used for agricultural purposes, while 1.75 km^{2} (0.68 sq mi) or 32.6% is forested. Of the rest of the land, 0.59 km^{2} (0.23 sq mi) or 11.0% is settled (buildings or roads), 0.21 km^{2} (0.081 sq mi) or 3.9% is either rivers or lakes and 0.02 km^{2} (4.9 acres) or 0.4% is unproductive land.

Of the built up area, housing and buildings made up 5.6% and transportation infrastructure made up 2.8%. Power and water infrastructure as well as other special developed areas made up 1.7% of the area Out of the forested land, 30.0% of the total land area is heavily forested and 2.6% is covered with orchards or small clusters of trees. Of the agricultural land, 41.8% is used for growing crops and 8.4% is pastures, while 2.1% is used for orchards or vine crops. All the water in the municipality is flowing water.

The municipality is located in the Swiss Champagne valley and contains the westernmost point in Switzerland. It consists of the villages of Chancy and Passeiry as well as the hamlet of Le Cannelet.

The municipality of Chancy consists of the sub-sections or villages of Chancy - Les Bois, Chancy - village, Chancy - plateau, Passeiry and Cannelet.

== Demographics ==
Largest groups of foreign residents 2013
| Nationality | Amount |
|---|---|
| Portugal | 61 |
| Italy | 48 |
| France | 40 |
| Spain | 24 |
| UK | 21 |
| Germany | 15 |
| Brazil | 12 |
| Russia | 11 |
| Ivory Coast | 10 |
| Belgium | 8 |

Chancy has a population (as of December 2020) of 1,708. As of 2008, 20.4% of the population are resident foreign nationals. Over the last 10 years (1999–2009 ) the population has changed at a rate of 27.4%. It has changed at a rate of 13.8% due to migration and at a rate of 12.9% due to births and deaths.

Most of the population (as of 2000) speaks French (785 or 86.0%), with English being second most common (48 or 5.3%) and German being third (30 or 3.3%).

As of 2008, the gender distribution of the population was 49.7% male and 50.3% female. The population was made up of 450 Swiss men (39.3% of the population) and 119 (10.4%) non-Swiss men. There were 457 Swiss women (39.9%) and 119 (10.4%) non-Swiss women. Of the population in the municipality 176 or about 19.3% were born in Chancy and lived there in 2000. There were 334 or 36.6% who were born in the same canton, while 134 or 14.7% were born somewhere else in Switzerland, and 246 or 26.9% were born outside of Switzerland.

In 2008 there were 6 live births to Swiss citizens and were 5 deaths of Swiss citizens. Ignoring immigration and emigration, the population of Swiss citizens increased by 1 while the foreign population remained the same. There were 2 Swiss men and 7 Swiss women who emigrated from Switzerland. At the same time, there were 7 non-Swiss men and 4 non-Swiss women who immigrated from another country to Switzerland. The total Swiss population change in 2008 (from all sources, including moves across municipal borders) was an increase of 16 and the non-Swiss population increased by 23 people. This represents a population growth rate of 3.6%.

The age distribution of the population (as of 2000) is children and teenagers (0–19 years old) make up 29.4% of the population, while adults (20–64 years old) make up 65% and seniors (over 64 years old) make up 5.7%.

As of 2000, there were 386 people who were single and never married in the municipality. There were 447 married individuals, 23 widows or widowers and 57 individuals who are divorced.

As of 2000, there were 343 private households in the municipality, and an average of 2.6 persons per household. There were 77 households that consist of only one person and 22 households with five or more people. Out of a total of 355 households that answered this question, 21.7% were households made up of just one person and there was 1 adult who lived with their parents. Of the rest of the households, there are 92 married couples without children, 137 married couples with children There were 32 single parents with a child or children. There were 4 households that were made up of unrelated people and 12 households that were made up of some sort of institution or another collective housing.

In 2000 there were 115 single family homes (or 61.8% of the total) out of a total of 186 inhabited buildings. There were 33 multi-family buildings (17.7%), along with 30 multi-purpose buildings that were mostly used for housing (16.1%) and 8 other use buildings (commercial or industrial) that also had some housing (4.3%). Of the single family homes 35 were built before 1919, while 5 were built between 1990 and 2000.

In 2000 there were 350 apartments in the municipality. The most common apartment size was 4 rooms of which there were 104. There were 17 single room apartments and 92 apartments with five or more rooms. Of these apartments, a total of 322 apartments (92.0% of the total) were permanently occupied, while 14 apartments (4.0%) were seasonally occupied and 14 apartments (4.0%) were empty. As of 2009, the construction rate of new housing units was 0 new units per 1000 residents. The vacancy rate for the municipality, in 2010, was 0%.

The historical population is given in the following chart:

== Politics ==
In the 2007 federal election the most popular party was the SVP which received 28.7% of the vote. The next three most popular parties were the FDP (18.22%), the SP (14.08%) and the Green Party (12.57%). In the federal election, a total of 297 votes were cast, and the voter turnout was 47.4%.

In the 2009 Grand Conseil election, there were a total of 632 registered voters of which 239 (37.8%) voted. The most popular party in the municipality for this election was the MCG with 22.2% of the ballots. In the canton-wide election they received the third highest proportion of votes. The second most popular party was the Les Radicaux (with 16.2%), they were sixth in the canton-wide election, while the third most popular party was the Les Verts (with 11.5%), they were second in the canton-wide election.

For the 2009 Conseil d'Etat election, there were a total of 630 registered voters of which 295 (46.8%) voted.

In 2011, all the municipalities held local elections, and in Chancy there were 13 spots open on the municipal council. There were a total of 771 registered voters of which 401 (52.0%) voted. Out of the 401 votes, there were 1 blank votes, 1 null or unreadable votes and 61 votes with a name that was not on the list.

== Economy ==
As of 2010, Chancy had an unemployment rate of 5.6%. As of 2008, there were 18 people employed in the primary economic sector and about 7 businesses involved in this sector. 8 people were employed in the secondary sector and there were 3 businesses in this sector. 60 people were employed in the tertiary sector, with 19 businesses in this sector. There were 494 residents of the municipality who were employed in some capacity, of which females made up 46.4% of the workforce.

In 2008 the total number of full-time equivalent jobs was 60. The number of jobs in the primary sector was 10, all of which were in agriculture. The number of jobs in the secondary sector was 7 of which 3 or (42.9%) were in manufacturing and 4 (57.1%) were in construction. The number of jobs in the tertiary sector was 43. In the tertiary sector; 14 or 32.6% were in wholesale or retail sales or the repair of motor vehicles, 5 or 11.6% were in a hotel or restaurant, 2 or 4.7% were in the information industry, 3 or 7.0% were technical professionals or scientists, 7 or 16.3% were in education and 3 or 7.0% were in health care.

In 2000, there were 34 workers who commuted into the municipality and 442 workers who commuted away. The municipality is a net exporter of workers, with about 13.0 workers leaving the municipality for every one entering. About 14.7% of the workforce coming into Chancy are coming from outside Switzerland. Of the working population, 11.7% used public transportation to get to work, and 76.5% used a private car.

== Religion ==
From the 2000 census, 231 or 25.3% were Roman Catholic, while 209 or 22.9% belonged to the Swiss Reformed Church. Of the rest of the population, there were 14 members of an Orthodox church (or about 1.53% of the population), there were 2 individuals (or about 0.22% of the population) who belonged to the Christian Catholic Church, and there were 38 individuals (or about 4.16% of the population) who belonged to another Christian church. There were 3 individuals (or about 0.33% of the population) who were Jewish, and 5 (or about 0.55% of the population) who were Islamic. There was 1 person who was Buddhist. 340 (or about 37.24% of the population) belonged to no church, are agnostic or atheist, and 70 individuals (or about 7.67% of the population) did not answer the question.

== Education ==
In Chancy about 290 or (31.8%) of the population have completed non-mandatory upper secondary education, and 239 or (26.2%) have completed additional higher education (either university or a Fachhochschule). Of the 239 who completed tertiary schooling, 40.6% were Swiss men, 31.4% were Swiss women, 15.1% were non-Swiss men and 13.0% were non-Swiss women.

During the 2009–2010 school year there were a total of 288 students in the Chancy school system. The education system in the Canton of Geneva allows young children to attend two years of non-obligatory kindergarten. During that school year, there were 31 children who were in a pre-kindergarten class. The canton's school system provides two years of non-mandatory kindergarten and requires students to attend six years of primary school, with some of the children attending smaller, specialized classes. In Chancy there were 45 students in kindergarten or primary school and 3 students were in the special, smaller classes. The secondary school program consists of three lower, obligatory years of schooling, followed by three to five years of optional, advanced schools. There were 45 lower secondary students who attended school in Chancy. There were 59 upper secondary students from the municipality along with 8 students who were in a professional, non-university track program. An additional 18 students attended a private school.

As of 2000, there were 6 students in Chancy who came from another municipality, while 84 residents attended schools outside the municipality.
