= Avusy =

- Municipality
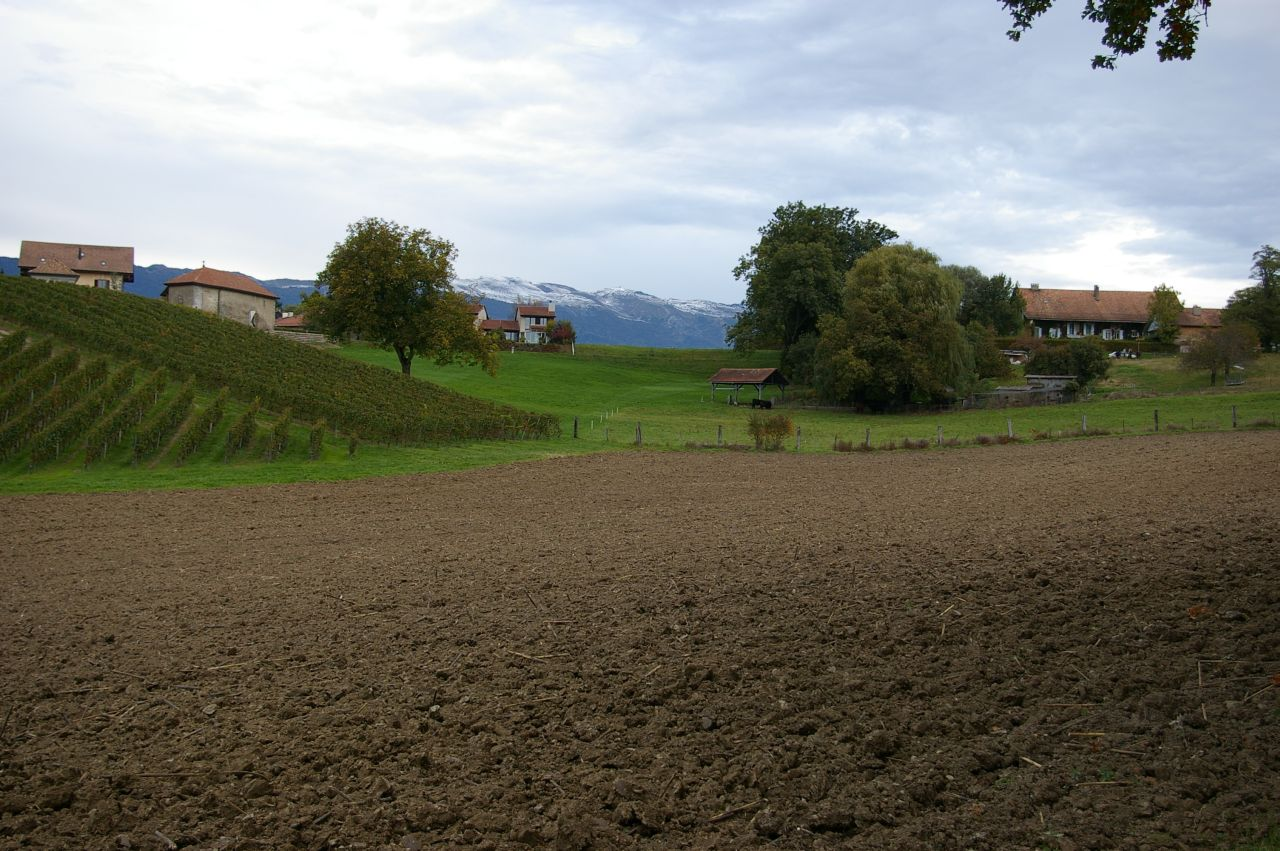

- Flag Coat of arms
- Location of Avusy
- Location within Switzerland Location within Canton of Geneva
- Coordinates: 46°09′N 5°59′E
- Country: Switzerland
- Canton: Geneva
- District: n.a.

Government
  - Mayor: Maire; René Jemmely

Area
  - Total: 5.19 km^{2} (2.00 sq mi)
- Elevation: 410 m (1,350 ft)

Population (December 2020)
  - Total: 1,391
  - Density: 268/km^{2} (694/sq mi)
- Time zone: UTC+01:00 (CET)
  - Summer (DST): UTC+02:00 (CEST)
- Postal code: 1285
- SFOS number: 6604
- ISO 3166 code: CH-GE
- Surrounded by: Avully, Cartigny, Chancy, Laconnex, Soral, Viry (FR-74)
- Website: www.avusy.ch

Avusy (French pronunciation: [avyzi]; Arpitan: Avouesi) is a municipality in the canton of Geneva in Switzerland.

== History ==
Avusy is first mentioned in 1260 as Avussie.

== Geography ==
Avusy has an area, as of 2009, of 5.19 square kilometers (2.00 sq mi). Of this area, 3.56 km^{2} (1.37 sq mi) or 68.6% is used for agricultural purposes, while 0.46 km^{2} (0.18 sq mi) or 8.9% is forested. Of the rest of the land, 1.13 km^{2} (0.44 sq mi) or 21.8% is settled (buildings or roads), 0.03 km^{2} (7.4 acres) or 0.6% is either rivers or lakes and 0.01 km^{2} (2.5 acres) or 0.2% is unproductive land.

Of the built up area, housing and buildings made up 8.5% and transportation infrastructure made up 3.5%. Power and water infrastructure as well as other special developed areas made up 9.1% of the area Out of the forested land, 4.4% of the total land area is heavily forested and 4.4% is covered with orchards or small clusters of trees. Of the agricultural land, 53.6% is used for growing crops and 8.5% is pastures, while 6.6% is used for orchards or vine crops. All the water in the municipality is flowing water.

The municipality is located in the countryside outside Geneva. It consists of the villages of Avusy-Village, Athenaz, Sézegnin and the hamlet of Champlong. The settlement of Seingier existed between the 13th and 15th Century, but has since vanished.

The municipality of Avusy consists of the sub-sections or villages of Le Château, Les Creux-du-Loup, Le Pigeonnier, Les Gravières and Le Renfort.

== Demographics ==
Largest groups of foreign residents 2013
Nationality	Amount	% total (population)
France	31	2.2
UK	28	2.0
Portugal	27	1.9
Germany	19	1.3
Italy	12	0.8
Spain	8	0.6
Finland	7	0.5
Belgium	6	0.4
Poland	5	0.3
Slovakia	5	0.3

Avusy has a population (as of December 2020) of 1,391. As of 2008, 14.1% of the population are resident foreign nationals. Over the last 10 years (1999–2009 ) the population has changed at a rate of 17%. It has changed at a rate of 9.1% due to migration and at a rate of 8.6% due to births and deaths.

Most of the population (as of 2000) speaks French (1,019 or 86.6%), with German being second most common (55 or 4.7%) and English being third (50 or 4.2%).

As of 2008, the gender distribution of the population was 49.0% male and 51.0% female. The population was made up of 582 Swiss men (41.7% of the population) and 101 (7.2%) non-Swiss men. There were 620 Swiss women (44.4%) and 92 (6.6%) non-Swiss women. Of the population in the municipality 251 or about 21.3% were born in Avusy and lived there in 2000. There were 428 or 36.4% who were born in the same canton, while 193 or 16.4% were born somewhere else in Switzerland, and 258 or 21.9% were born outside of Switzerland.

In 2008 there were 7 live births to Swiss citizens and 2 births to non-Swiss citizens, and in same time span there were 6 deaths of Swiss citizens. Ignoring immigration and emigration, the population of Swiss citizens increased by 1 while the foreign population increased by 2. There was 1 Swiss man and 2 Swiss women who immigrated back to Switzerland. At the same time, there were 4 non-Swiss men who immigrated from another country to Switzerland and 1 non-Swiss woman who emigrated from Switzerland to another country. The total Swiss population change in 2008 (from all sources, including moves across municipal borders) was an increase of 53 and the non-Swiss population increased by 14 people. This represents a population growth rate of 5.1%. The age distribution of the population (as of 2000) is children and teenagers (0–19 years old) make up 27.3% of the population, while adults (20–64 years old) make up 64.7% and seniors (over 64 years old) make up 8%.

As of 2000, there were 507 people who were single and never married in the municipality. There were 594 married individuals, 21 widows or widowers and 55 individuals who are divorced.

As of 2000, there were 430 private households in the municipality, and an average of 2.7 persons per household. There were 98 households that consist of only one person and 43 households with five or more people. Out of a total of 443 households that answered this question, 22.1% were households made up of just one person and there were 3 adults who lived with their parents. Of the rest of the households, there are 115 married couples without children, 184 married couples with children There were 22 single parents with a child or children. There were 8 households that were made up of unrelated people and 13 households that were made up of some sort of institution or another collective housing.

In 2000 there were 238 single family homes (or 72.3% of the total) out of a total of 329 inhabited buildings. There were 46 multi-family buildings (14.0%), along with 31 multi-purpose buildings that were mostly used for housing (9.4%) and 14 other use buildings (commercial or industrial) that also had some housing (4.3%). Of the single family homes 65 were built before 1919, while 19 were built between 1990 and 2000. The greatest number of single family homes (92) were built between 1981 and 1990.

In 2000 there were 451 apartments in the municipality. The most common apartment size was 4 rooms of which there were 99. There were 21 single room apartments and 191 apartments with five or more rooms. Of these apartments, a total of 416 apartments (92.2% of the total) were permanently occupied, while 27 apartments (6.0%) were seasonally occupied and 8 apartments (1.8%) were empty. As of 2009, the construction rate of new housing units was 1.5 new units per 1000 residents. The vacancy rate for the municipality, in 2010, was 0%.

The historical population is given in the following chart:

== Sights ==
The entire village of Sézegnin is designated as part of the Inventory of Swiss Heritage Sites.

== Politics ==
In the 2007 federal election the most popular party was the CVP which received 21.23% of the vote. The next three most popular parties were the SVP (19.38%), the Green Party (17%) and the SP (13.97%). In the federal election, a total of 424 votes were cast, and the voter turnout was 51.8%.

In the 2009 Grand Conseil election, there were a total of 874 registered voters of which 405 (46.3%) voted. The most popular party in the municipality for this election was the PDC with 18.2% of the ballots. In the canton-wide election they received the fifth highest proportion of votes. The second most popular party was the Libéral (with 13.4%), they were first in the canton-wide election, while the third most popular party was the Les Radicaux (with 12.9%), they were sixth in the canton-wide election.

For the 2009 Conseil d'État election, there were a total of 865 registered voters of which 459 (53.1%) voted.

In 2011, all the municipalities held local elections, and in Avusy there were 13 spots open on the municipal council. There were a total of 965 registered voters of which 590 (61.1%) voted. Out of the 590 votes, there were 1 blank votes, 3 null or unreadable votes and 63 votes with a name that was not on the list.

== Economy ==
As of 2010, Avusy had an unemployment rate of 4%. As of 2008, there were 48 people employed in the primary economic sector and about 13 businesses involved in this sector. 43 people were employed in the secondary sector and there were 10 businesses in this sector. 72 people were employed in the tertiary sector, with 31 businesses in this sector. There were 622 residents of the municipality who were employed in some capacity, of which females made up 45.0% of the workforce.

In 2008 the total number of full-time equivalent jobs was 129. The number of jobs in the primary sector was 34, all of which were in agriculture. The number of jobs in the secondary sector was 40 of which 10 or (25.0%) were in manufacturing, 17 or (42.5%) were in mining and 14 (35.0%) were in construction. The number of jobs in the tertiary sector was 55. In the tertiary sector; 8 or 14.5% were in wholesale or retail sales or the repair of motor vehicles, 1 was in the movement and storage of goods, 10 or 18.2% were in a hotel or restaurant, 4 or 7.3% were in the information industry, 15 or 27.3% were technical professionals or scientists, 7 or 12.7% were in education and 1 was in health care.

In 2000, there were 51 workers who commuted into the municipality and 531 workers who commuted away. The municipality is a net exporter of workers, with about 10.4 workers leaving the municipality for every one entering. About 15.7% of the workforce coming into Avusy are coming from outside Switzerland. Of the working population, 11.9% used public transportation to get to work, and 74.4% used a private car.

== Religion ==
From the 2000 census, 538 or 45.7% were Roman Catholic, while 264 or 22.4% belonged to the Swiss Reformed Church. Of the rest of the population, there were 2 members of an Orthodox church (or about 0.17% of the population), there were 3 individuals (or about 0.25% of the population) who belonged to the Christian Catholic Church, and there were 12 individuals (or about 1.02% of the population) who belonged to another Christian church. There were 4 (or about 0.34% of the population) who were Islamic. There were 2 individuals who were Buddhist, 2 individuals who were Hindu and 1 individual who belonged to another church. 281 (or about 23.87% of the population) belonged to no church, are agnostic or atheist, and 68 individuals (or about 5.78% of the population) did not answer the question.

== Education ==
In Avusy about 392 or (33.3%) of the population have completed non-mandatory upper secondary education, and 305 or (25.9%) have completed additional higher education (either university or a Fachhochschule). Of the 305 who completed tertiary schooling, 42.0% were Swiss men, 38.4% were Swiss women, 11.1% were non-Swiss men and 8.5% were non-Swiss women.

During the 2009–2010 school year there were a total of 342 students in the Avusy school system. The education system in the Canton of Geneva allows young children to attend two years of non-obligatory Kindergarten. During that school year, there were 32 children who were in a pre-kindergarten class. The canton's school system provides two years of non-mandatory kindergarten and requires students to attend six years of primary school, with some of the children attending smaller, specialized classes. In Avusy there were 46 students in kindergarten or primary school and 2 students were in the special, smaller classes. The secondary school program consists of three lower, obligatory years of schooling, followed by three to five years of optional, advanced schools. There were 46 lower secondary students who attended school in Avusy. There were 73 upper secondary students from the municipality along with 10 students who were in a professional, non-university track program. An additional 29 students attended a private school.

As of 2000, there were 5 students in Avusy who came from another municipality, while 134 residents attended schools outside the municipality.
