= Soral =

- Municipality
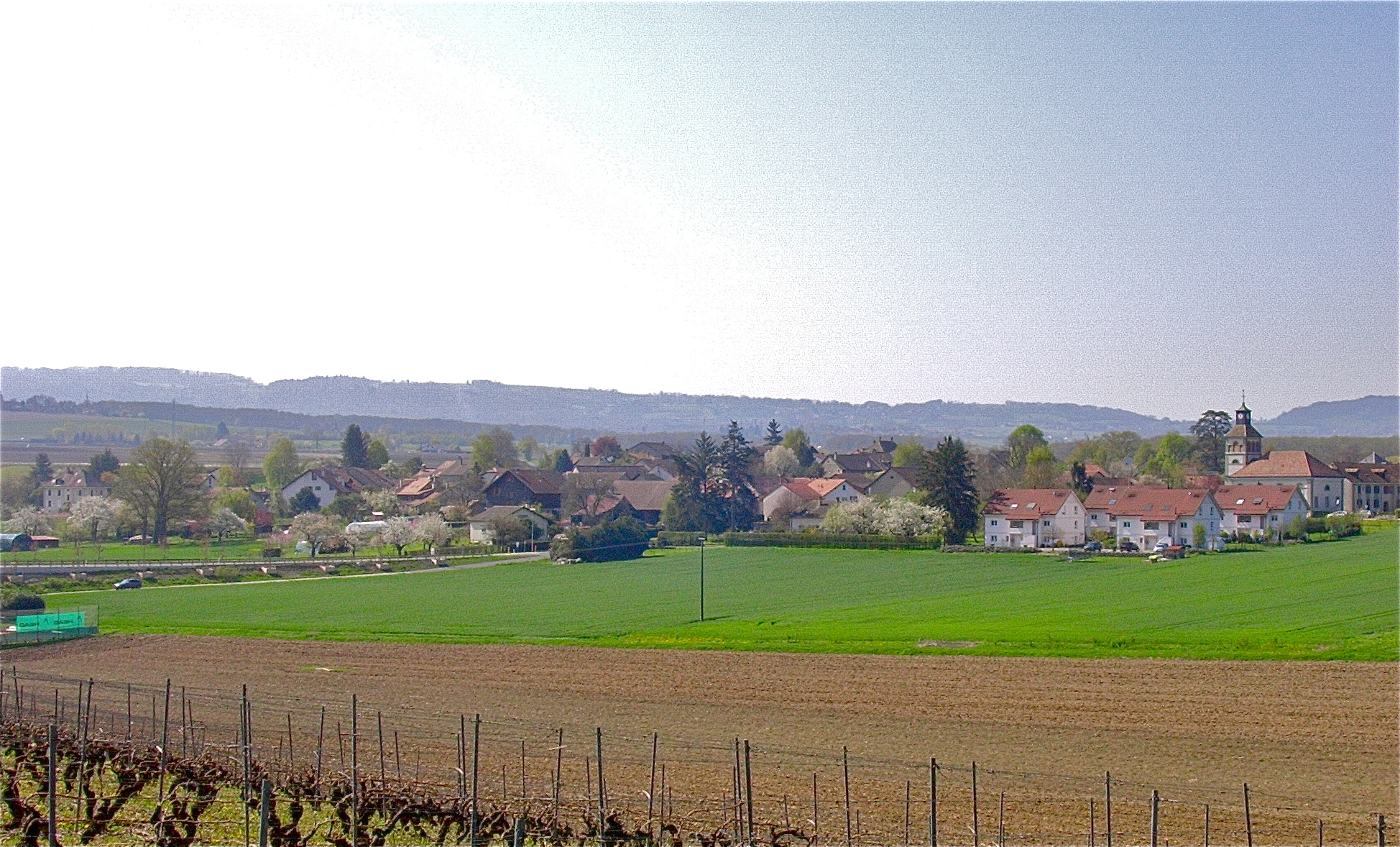

- Flag Coat of arms
- Location of Soral
- Location within Switzerland Location within Canton of Geneva
- Coordinates: 46°08′N 6°03′E
- Country: Switzerland
- Canton: Geneva
- District: n.a.

Government
  - Mayor: Maire

Area
  - Total: 2.95 km^{2} (1.14 sq mi)
- Elevation: 450 m (1,480 ft)

Population (December 2020)
  - Total: 976
  - Density: 331/km^{2} (857/sq mi)
- Time zone: UTC+01:00 (CET)
  - Summer (DST): UTC+02:00 (CEST)
- Postal code: 1286
- SFOS number: 6639
- ISO 3166 code: CH-GE
- Surrounded by: Avusy, Bernex, Laconnex, Perly-Certoux, Saint-Julien-en-Genevois (FR-74), Viry (FR-74)
- Website: www.soral.ch

Soral is a municipality in the Canton of Geneva, Switzerland.

== History ==
Soral is first mentioned in 1236 as Sorraz.

== Geography ==
Soral has an area, as of 2009, of 2.95 square kilometers (1.14 sq mi). Of this area, 2.44 km^{2} (0.94 sq mi) or 82.7% is used for agricultural purposes, while 0.12 km^{2} (0.046 sq mi) or 4.1% is forested. Of the rest of the land, 0.37 km^{2} (0.14 sq mi) or 12.5% is settled (buildings or roads).

Of the built up area, housing and buildings made up 6.1% and transportation infrastructure made up 2.7%. Power and water infrastructure as well as other special developed areas made up 2.7% of the area Out of the forested land, 2.7% of the total land area is heavily forested and 1.4% is covered with orchards or small clusters of trees. Of the agricultural land, 62.4% is used for growing crops and 3.7% is pastures, while 16.6% is used for orchards or vine crops.

The municipality is the southernmost municipality of the canton and lies on the Swiss-French border between Saint-Julien-en-Genevois and Viry, both in the Haute-Savoie department.

The municipality of Soral consists of the sub-sections or villages of Plaine-du-Loup, Les Lolliets and Entre-Deux-Vignobles.

== Demographics ==
Largest groups of foreign residents 2013
Nationality	Amount	% total (population)
France	41	5.5
Portugal	27	3.6
UK	24	3.2
Spain	9	1.2
Italy	5	0.7

Soral has a population (as of December 2020) of 976. As of 2008, 16.3% of the population are resident foreign nationals. Over the last 10 years (1999–2009 ) the population has changed at a rate of 21.3%. It has changed at a rate of 37.7% due to migration and at a rate of -15.5% due to births and deaths.

Most of the population (as of 2000) speaks French (542 or 90.8%), with German being second most common (18 or 3.0%) and English being third (13 or 2.2%). There are 3 people who speak Italian.

As of 2008, the gender distribution of the population was 49.4% male and 50.6% female. The population was made up of 286 Swiss men (39.3% of the population) and 73 (10.0%) non-Swiss men. There were 294 Swiss women (40.4%) and 74 (10.2%) non-Swiss women. Of the population in the municipality 177 or about 29.6% were born in Soral and lived there in 2000. There were 174 or 29.1% who were born in the same canton, while 65 or 10.9% were born somewhere else in Switzerland, and 112 or 18.8% were born outside of Switzerland.

In 2008 there were 9 live births to Swiss citizens and were 22 deaths of Swiss citizens and 2 non-Swiss citizen deaths. Ignoring immigration and emigration, the population of Swiss citizens decreased by 13 while the foreign population decreased by 2. There was 1 Swiss man and 1 Swiss woman who immigrated back to Switzerland. At the same time, there were 5 non-Swiss men and 7 non-Swiss women who immigrated from another country to Switzerland. The total Swiss population change in 2008 (from all sources, including moves across municipal borders) was an increase of 11 and the non-Swiss population increased by 10 people. This represents a population growth rate of 3.1%.

The age distribution of the population (as of 2000) is children and teenagers (0–19 years old) make up 21.9% of the population, while adults (20–64 years old) make up 61.1% and seniors (over 64 years old) make up 16.9%.

As of 2000, there were 241 people who were single and never married in the municipality. There were 291 married individuals, 43 widows or widowers and 22 individuals who are divorced.

As of 2000, there were 198 private households in the municipality, and an average of 2.7 persons per household. There were 52 households that consist of only one person and 21 households with five or more people. Out of a total of 203 households that answered this question, 25.6% were households made up of just one person and there was 1 adult who lived with their parents. Of the rest of the households, there are 48 married couples without children, 83 married couples with children There were 12 single parents with a child or children. There were 2 households that were made up of unrelated people and 5 households that were made up of some sort of institution or another collective housing.

In 2000 there were 88 single family homes (or 61.5% of the total) out of a total of 143 inhabited buildings. There were 23 multi-family buildings (16.1%), along with 29 multi-purpose buildings that were mostly used for housing (20.3%) and 3 other use buildings (commercial or industrial) that also had some housing (2.1%). Of the single family homes 30 were built before 1919, while 4 were built between 1990 and 2000. The greatest number of multi-family homes (6) were built before 1919 and again between 1946 and 1960.

In 2000 there were 203 apartments in the municipality. The most common apartment size was 3 rooms of which there were 52. There were 12 single room apartments and 84 apartments with five or more rooms. Of these apartments, a total of 179 apartments (88.2% of the total) were permanently occupied, while 18 apartments (8.9%) were seasonally occupied and 6 apartments (3.0%) were empty. As of 2009, the construction rate of new housing units was 29.2 new units per 1000 residents. The vacancy rate for the municipality, in 2010, was 0.41%.

The historical population is given in the following chart:

== Sights ==
The entire village of Soral is designated as part of the Inventory of Swiss Heritage Sites.

== Twin Town ==
Soral is twinned with the town of Labeaume, France.

== Politics ==
In the 2007 federal election the most popular party was the LPS Party which received 23.15% of the vote. The next three most popular parties were the SVP (20.39%), the CVP (15.35%) and the Green Party (13.41%). In the federal election, a total of 256 votes were cast, and the voter turnout was 57.4%.

In the 2009 Grand Conseil election, there were a total of 449 registered voters of which 206 (45.9%) voted. The most popular party in the municipality for this election was the PDC with 18.4% of the ballots. In the canton-wide election they received the fifth highest proportion of votes. The second most popular party was the Libéral (with 18.4%), they were first in the canton-wide election, while the third most popular party was the MCG (with 13.4%), they were also third in the canton-wide election.

For the 2009 Conseil d'Etat election, there were a total of 454 registered voters of which 248 (54.6%) voted.

In 2011, all the municipalities held local elections, and in Soral there were 11 spots open on the municipal council. There were a total of 491 registered voters of which 235 (47.9%) voted. Out of the 235 votes, there were 1 blank votes, 14 votes with a name that was not on the list.

== Economy ==
As of 2010, Soral had an unemployment rate of 2.4%. As of 2008, there were 51 people employed in the primary economic sector and about 13 businesses involved in this sector. 3 people were employed in the secondary sector and there were 3 businesses in this sector. 51 people were employed in the tertiary sector, with 6 businesses in this sector. There were 272 residents of the municipality who were employed in some capacity, of which females made up 41.2% of the workforce.

In 2008 the total number of full-time equivalent jobs was 84. The number of jobs in the primary sector was 36, all of which were in agriculture. The number of jobs in the secondary sector was 3 of which 1 was in manufacturing and 2 (66.7%) were in construction. The number of jobs in the tertiary sector was 45. In the tertiary sector; 12 or 26.7% were in a hotel or restaurant, 1 was a technical professional or scientist, 3 or 6.7% were in education and 28 or 62.2% were in health care.

In 2000, there were 173 workers who commuted into the municipality and 220 workers who commuted away. The municipality is a net exporter of workers, with about 1.3 workers leaving the municipality for every one entering. About 30.6% of the workforce coming into Soral are coming from outside Switzerland, while 0.5% of the locals commute out of Switzerland for work. Of the working population, 8.1% used public transportation to get to work, and 72.4% used a private car.

== Religion ==
From the 2000 census, 313 or 52.4% were Roman Catholic, while 92 or 15.4% belonged to the Swiss Reformed Church. Of the rest of the population, there was 1 member of an Orthodox church, and there were 8 individuals (or about 1.34% of the population) who belonged to another Christian church. There were 3 individuals (or about 0.50% of the population) who were Jewish, and there was 1 individual who was Islamic. 153 (or about 25.63% of the population) belonged to no church, are agnostic or atheist, and 26 individuals (or about 4.36% of the population) did not answer the question.

== Education ==
In Soral about 205 or (34.3%) of the population have completed non-mandatory upper secondary education, and 121 or (20.3%) have completed additional higher education (either university or a Fachhochschule). Of the 121 who completed tertiary schooling, 44.6% were Swiss men, 30.6% were Swiss women, 12.4% were non-Swiss men and 12.4% were non-Swiss women.

During the 2009–2010 school year there were a total of 150 students in the Soral school system. The education system in the Canton of Geneva allows young children to attend two years of non-obligatory Kindergarten. During that school year, there were 19 children who were in a pre-kindergarten class. The canton's school system provides two years of non-mandatory kindergarten and requires students to attend six years of primary school, with some of the children attending smaller, specialized classes. In Soral there were 22 students in kindergarten or primary school and 2 students were in the special, smaller classes. The secondary school program consists of three lower, obligatory years of schooling, followed by three to five years of optional, advanced schools. There were 22 lower secondary students who attended school in Soral. There were 27 upper secondary students from the municipality along with 2 students who were in a professional, non-university track program. An additional 18 students attended a private school.

As of 2000, there were 28 students in Soral who came from another municipality, while 94 residents attended schools outside the municipality.
