= Avully =

- Municipality
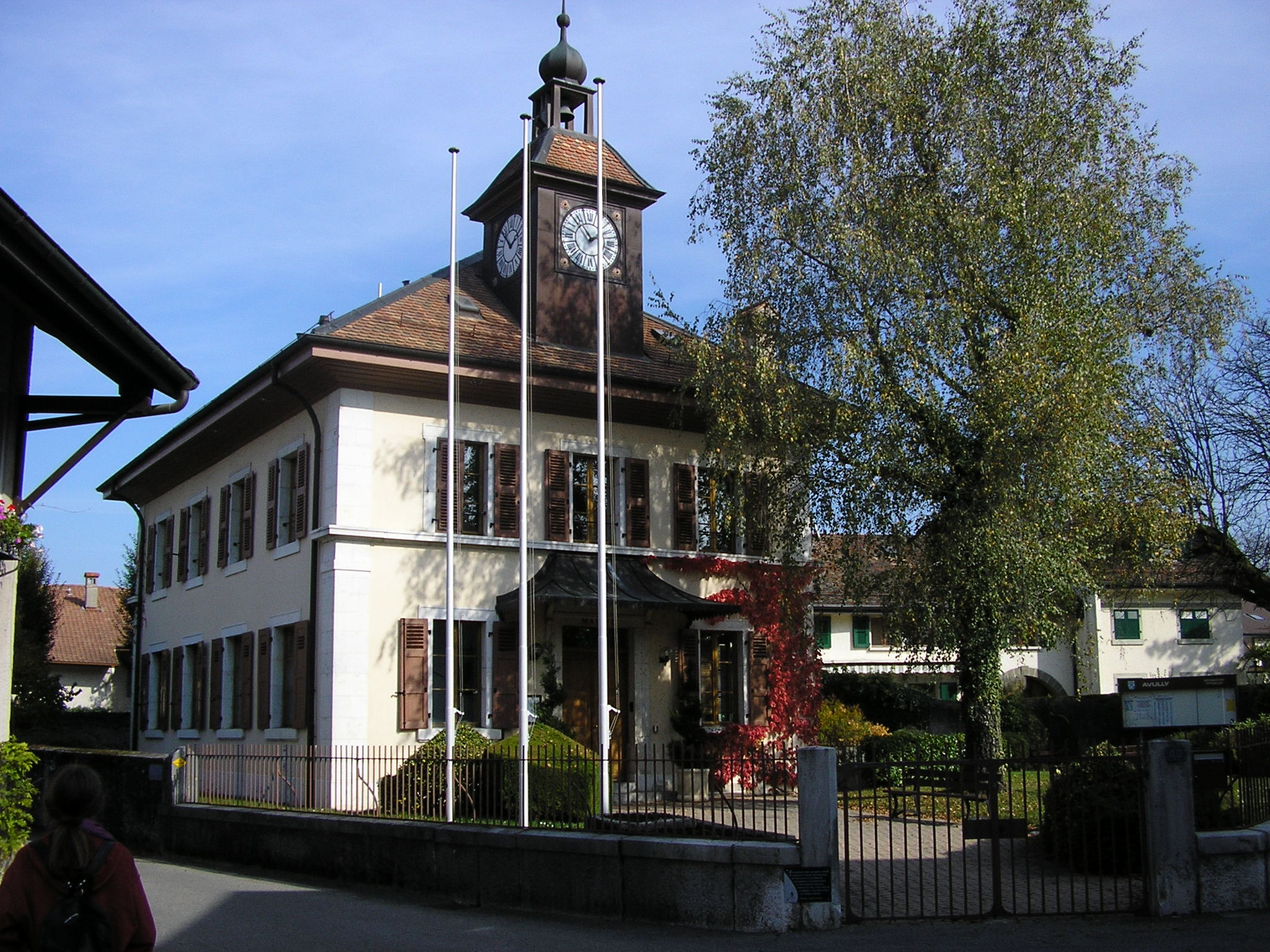

- Flag Coat of arms
- Location of Avully
- Location within Switzerland Location within Canton of Geneva
- Coordinates: 46°10′N 6°00′E
- Country: Switzerland
- Canton: Geneva
- District: n.a.

Government
  - Mayor: Maire

Area
  - Total: 4.61 km^{2} (1.78 sq mi)
- Elevation: 420 m (1,380 ft)

Population (December 2020)
  - Total: 1,756
  - Density: 381/km^{2} (987/sq mi)
- Time zone: UTC+01:00 (CET)
  - Summer (DST): UTC+02:00 (CEST)
- Postal code: 1237
- SFOS number: 6603
- ISO 3166 code: CH-GE
- Surrounded by: Avusy, Cartigny, Challex (FR-01), Chancy, Dardagny, Laconnex, Russin
- Website: www.avully.ch

Avully is a municipality in the canton of Geneva in Switzerland.

== History ==
Avully is first mentioned in 1220 as Avulie.

== Geography ==
Avully has an area, as of 2009, of 4.61 square kilometers (1.78 sq mi). Of this area, 2.96 km^{2} (1.14 sq mi) or 64.2% is used for agricultural purposes, while 0.69 km^{2} (0.27 sq mi) or 15.0% is forested. Of the rest of the land, 0.68 km^{2} (0.26 sq mi) or 14.8% is settled (buildings or roads), 0.29 km^{2} (0.11 sq mi) or 6.3% is either rivers or lakes and 0.02 km^{2} (4.9 acres) or 0.4% is unproductive land.

Of the built up area, housing and buildings made up 7.8% and transportation infrastructure made up 4.1%. while parks, green belts and sports fields made up 2.0%. Out of the forested land, 11.5% of the total land area is heavily forested and 3.5% is covered with orchards or small clusters of trees. Of the agricultural land, 42.7% is used for growing crops and 15.4% is pastures, while 6.1% is used for orchards or vine crops. All the water in the municipality is flowing water.

The municipality is located in the Champagne region. It consists of the settlements of Avully-Village, Epeisses, Eaumorte and Gennecy..

The municipality of Avully consists of the sub-sections or villages of La Touvière, Avully - Eaumorte, Avully - village, Avully - Gennecy and Epeisses.

== Demographics ==
Largest groups of foreign residents 2013
Nationality	Amount
Portugal	97
France	49
Italy	45
Spain	33
UK	24
Belgium	10
Brazil	10
Poland	7
Cameroon	7
Netherlands	5

Avully has a population (as of December 2020) of 1,756. As of 2008, 18.0% of the population are resident foreign nationals. Over the last 10 years (1999–2009 ) the population has changed at a rate of 1.3%. It has changed at a rate of -9.7% due to migration and at a rate of 11.3% due to births and deaths.

Most of the population (as of 2000) speaks French (1,543 or 88.9%), with English being second most common (49 or 2.8%) and German being third (44 or 2.5%). There is 1 person who speaks Romansh.

As of 2008, the gender distribution of the population was 49.4% male and 50.6% female. The population was made up of 701 Swiss men (39.6% of the population) and 174 (9.8%) non-Swiss men. There were 748 Swiss women (42.2%) and 149 (8.4%) non-Swiss women. Of the population in the municipality 400 or about 23.0% were born in Avully and lived there in 2000. There were 602 or 34.7% who were born in the same canton, while 274 or 15.8% were born somewhere else in Switzerland, and 394 or 22.7% were born outside of Switzerland.

In 2008 there were 23 live births to Swiss citizens and 1 birth to non-Swiss citizens, and in same time span there were 6 deaths of Swiss citizens and 1 non-Swiss citizen death. Ignoring immigration and emigration, the population of Swiss citizens increased by 17 while the foreign population remained the same. There were 15 Swiss men and 14 Swiss women who emigrated from Switzerland. At the same time, there were 4 non-Swiss men and 6 non-Swiss women who immigrated from another country to Switzerland. The total Swiss population change in 2008 (from all sources, including moves across municipal borders) was a decrease of 16 and the non-Swiss population increased by 20 people. This represents a population growth rate of 0.2%. The age distribution of the population (as of 2000) is children and teenagers (0–19 years old) make up 28.6% of the population, while adults (20–64 years old) make up 65% and seniors (over 64 years old) make up 6.4%.

As of 2000, there were 747 people who were single and never married in the municipality. There were 823 married individuals, 50 widows or widowers and 116 individuals who are divorced.

As of 2000, there were 679 private households in the municipality, and an average of 2.5 persons per household. There were 179 households that consist of only one person and 49 households with five or more people. Out of a total of 696 households that answered this question, 25.7% were households made up of just one person and there were 3 adults who lived with their parents. Of the rest of the households, there are 160 married couples without children, 258 married couples with children There were 73 single parents with a child or children. There were 6 households that were made up of unrelated people and 17 households that were made up of some sort of institution or another collective housing.

In 2000 there were 118 single family homes (or 48.0% of the total) out of a total of 246 inhabited buildings. There were 83 multi-family buildings (33.7%), along with 38 multi-purpose buildings that were mostly used for housing (15.4%) and 7 other use buildings (commercial or industrial) that also had some housing (2.8%). Of the single family homes 38 were built before 1919, while 8 were built between 1990 and 2000.

In 2000 there were 719 apartments in the municipality. The most common apartment size was 4 rooms of which there were 252. There were 34 single room apartments and 187 apartments with five or more rooms. Of these apartments, a total of 642 apartments (89.3% of the total) were permanently occupied, while 49 apartments (6.8%) were seasonally occupied and 28 apartments (3.9%) were empty. As of 2009, the construction rate of new housing units was 0 new units per 1000 residents. The vacancy rate for the municipality, in 2010, was 0.14%.

The historical population is given in the following chart:

== Sights ==
The entire village of Avully is designated as part of the Inventory of Swiss Heritage Sites.

== Politics ==
In the 2007 federal election the most popular party was the SP which received 21.79% of the vote. The next three most popular parties were the SVP (19.74%), the Green Party (18.57%) and the LPS Party (11.16%). In the federal election, a total of 491 votes were cast, and the voter turnout was 45.3%.

In the 2009 Grand Conseil election, there were a total of 1,099 registered voters of which 419 (38.1%) voted. The most popular party in the municipality for this election was the MCG with 22.2% of the ballots. In the canton-wide election they received the third highest proportion of votes. The second most popular party was the Les Verts (with 19.2%), they were also second in the canton-wide election, while the third most popular party was the Les Socialistes (with 11.3%), they were fourth in the canton-wide election.

For the 2009 Conseil d'Etat election, there were a total of 1,094 registered voters of which 520 (47.5%) voted.

In 2011, all the municipalities held local elections, and in Avully there were 15 spots open on the municipal council. There were a total of 1,263 registered voters of which 664 (52.6%) voted. Out of the 664 votes, there were 9 blank votes, 2 null or unreadable votes and 65 votes with a name that was not on the list.

== Economy ==
As of 2010, Avully had an unemployment rate of 5.2%. As of 2008, there were 25 people employed in the primary economic sector and about 10 businesses involved in this sector. 40 people were employed in the secondary sector and there were 12 businesses in this sector. 96 people were employed in the tertiary sector, with 36 businesses in this sector. There were 924 residents of the municipality who were employed in some capacity, of which females made up 45.8% of the workforce.

In 2008 the total number of full-time equivalent jobs was 135. The number of jobs in the primary sector was 19, of which 18 were in agriculture and 1 was in forestry or lumber production. The number of jobs in the secondary sector was 39 of which 13 or (33.3%) were in manufacturing and 14 (35.9%) were in construction. The number of jobs in the tertiary sector was 77. In the tertiary sector; 22 or 28.6% were in wholesale or retail sales or the repair of motor vehicles, 2 or 2.6% were in the movement and storage of goods, 12 or 15.6% were in a hotel or restaurant, 2 or 2.6% were in the information industry, 5 or 6.5% were technical professionals or scientists, 11 or 14.3% were in education and 6 or 7.8% were in health care.

In 2000, there were 59 workers who commuted into the municipality and 811 workers who commuted away. The municipality is a net exporter of workers, with about 13.7 workers leaving the municipality for every one entering. About 16.9% of the workforce coming into Avully are coming from outside Switzerland. Of the working population, 16.9% used public transportation to get to work, and 69.4% used a private car.

== Religion ==
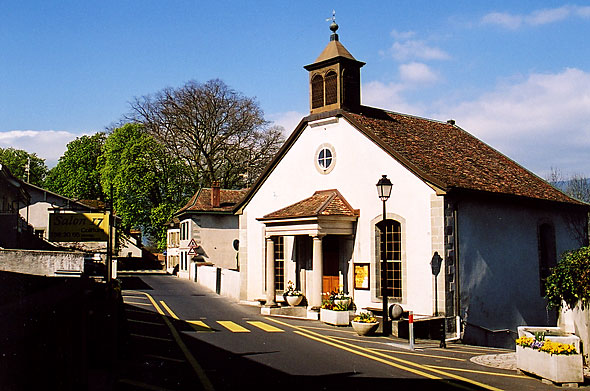
Protestant Church in Avully

From the 2000 census, 551 or 31.7% were Roman Catholic, while 429 or 24.7% belonged to the Swiss Reformed Church. Of the rest of the population, there were 4 members of an Orthodox church (or about 0.23% of the population), there were 4 individuals (or about 0.23% of the population) who belonged to the Christian Catholic Church, and there were 29 individuals (or about 1.67% of the population) who belonged to another Christian church. There were 7 individuals (or about 0.40% of the population) who were Jewish, and 16 (or about 0.92% of the population) who were Islamic. There were 4 individuals who were Buddhist and 7 individuals who belonged to another church. 567 (or about 32.66% of the population) belonged to no church, are agnostic or atheist, and 118 individuals (or about 6.80% of the population) did not answer the question.

== Education ==
In Avully about 646 or (37.2%) of the population have completed non-mandatory upper secondary education, and 289 or (16.6%) have completed additional higher education (either university or a Fachhochschule). Of the 289 who completed tertiary schooling, 45.3% were Swiss men, 34.9% were Swiss women, 10.0% were non-Swiss men and 9.7% were non-Swiss women.

During the 2009–2010 school year there were a total of 404 students in the Avully school system. The education system in the Canton of Geneva allows young children to attend two years of non-obligatory Kindergarten. During that school year, there were 46 children who were in a pre-kindergarten class. The canton's school system provides two years of non-mandatory kindergarten and requires students to attend six years of primary school, with some of the children attending smaller, specialized classes. In Avully there were 74 students in kindergarten or primary school and 7 students were in the special, smaller classes. The secondary school program consists of three lower, obligatory years of schooling, followed by three to five years of optional, advanced schools. There were 74 lower secondary students who attended school in Avully. There were 100 upper secondary students from the municipality along with 13 students who were in a professional, non-university track program. An additional 10 students attended a private school.

As of 2000, there were 3 students in Avully who came from another municipality, while 184 residents attended schools outside the municipality.
