= Éric Gaudibert =

Swiss composer (1936–2012)

- Born: December 21, 1936; Vevey, Switzerland
- Died: June 29, 2012 (aged 75); Confignon, Geneva

Éric Gaudibert (21 December 1936 – 28 June 2012) was a Swiss composer.

== Career ==
Gaudibert was born in Vevey. He studied piano and composition at the Conservatory of Lausanne, particularly with Denise Bidal and Hans Haug, and later in Paris in the École Normale de Musique with Alfred Cortot, Henri Dutilleux and Nadia Boulanger. He worked notably in the French "avant-garde" in 1972–1974 in the Maison de la Culture of Orléans.

A former professor in both Geneva (from 1975) and Neuchâtel, he pursued a tradition led by Béla Bartók, Arnold Schoenberg and Olivier Messiaen, and over time developed a personal style embracing electronics and the media, poetry, visual art (specifically that by Paul Klee), and literature in a specific spatial, timbral and philosophical inquiry on music.

He lived in Confignon, Switzerland, where he died aged 75.

== Works ==
Gaudibert's works are largely published by Swiss Music Editions and Éditions Papillon.

Opera

- Chacun son singe, Chamber Opera for soprano, baritone, instrumental ensemble and electronic tape (1973–1978); libretto by Philip Kermit Oxman

Orchestral

- 5 pièces brèves for string orchestra (1976)
- Divertimento for string orchestra (1978)
- Gemmes, 4 Pieces (1980)
- L'écharpe d'Iris, Prelude (1984–1985)
- Hommage(s) à..., Short Pieces (1985)
- Diamant d'herbe, Poem (1986)
- Duel for small string ensemble (ad lib.) (1990)
- Mélodie sans fin (1992)
- Jardin d'Est (1994)
- Concerto grosso for string orchestra (1998)
- Praeludium for string orchestra (2007)
- Sur la route du soleil levant for string orchestra (2007)

Concertante

- Epibolie for flute and string orchestra (1968)
- Un jardin pour Orphée for horn and string orchestra (1985)
- Océans, Concertino for flute and string orchestra (1988)
- Concerto "Su fondamenta insivisibli" for oboe and orchestra (1991)
- Albumblätter for flute and chamber orchestra (1992)
- Concerto for cello and orchestra (1993)
- Concertino for clarinet and string orchestra (1994)
- A... in Wonderland for viola and ensemble (2007)

Chamber Music

- Duo for 2 flutes (1959)
- Morceaux, 30 Pieces for recorders (1969)
- Epitase for violin, viola, cello, harpsichord and tape (1970–1974)
- Syzygy for flute and prepared piano (1971)
- String Quartet No.1 "Entre se taire et dire" (1971)
- Vernescence for clarinet (or basset horn, or bass clarinet), piano and electroacoustic device (1973)
- Variations lyriques for cello solo (1976)
- Suite en 5 pièces for guitar solo (1977)
- Capriccio for violin solo (1978)
- Contrechamps for flute, oboe, cello and harpsichord (1979)
- Astrance for wind quintet (1980)
- Light for trumpet and piano (1981)
- Orées for violin, flute, violoncello, piano and clarinet (1986)
- Miscellanées for panpipes, clarinet, cello, marimba, harpsichord and spinet, electro-acoustic slide show (1986)
- Feuillages for 3 percussionists (1988)
- Songes (Songs) for violin and piano (1989)
- Songes, bruissements for violin, cello and piano (1990)
- Petite Suite, 6 Pieces for 2, 3, and 4 cellos (1990)
- Zwielicht (Twilight) for flute and harp (1990)
- Albumblätter for 2 flutes (1992–2000)
- Sérénade for violin, viola, cello and piano (1992)
- Chant de l'aube for horn solo (1993)
- Chant de l'aube for viola solo (1993–1995)
- Fanfare pour la paix for solo and ensemble ad lib. (1994)
- 33 Chansons for 2 guitars (1994)
- Deux pas dans le gris for accordion solo (1994–1999)
- Deux ou trois pas... for double bass solo (1994–1998)
- Deux ou trois pas dans le gris for double bass and accordion (1994)
- Le dit d'elle for double bass solo (1995)
- Ce tremblement, qui est une volupté, Duo for 2 oboes (1997–1999)
- Voce, voci for harp (1997)
- Fantaisie concertante for flute and cello (1998–1999)
- Canzone a tre for recorder, Baroque violin and Baroque cello (1998–2000)
- Trois pièces pour accordéon (1999)
- Wolkenblau for alto flute and guitar (1999–2000)
- A due for oboe, clarinet, violin and double bass (2000)
- Message for cello solo and viola (2000)
- 5 pièces for 1, 2 or 3 saxophones (2001)
- Remember... for cello and electronics (2001)
- Une promenade for transverse flute, bassoon and natural horn (2002)
- Mayn kind, mayn treyt for violin and guitar (2002–2004)
- "Pierrot, à table!" ou Le souper du poète for percussion, accordion, saxophone, horn and piano (2003)
- Hekâyat for rubab, viola, oboe and percussion (2003)
- Pour Orphée for horn solo (2004)
- Message(s) for cello solo and string quartet (2004)
- Ciel d'ombre, 3 pieces for theorbo (2004)
- Ciel d'ombre for oboe, theorbo and electronics (2004–2005)
- Au delà for flute, viola and cello (2005)
- Images japonaises for horn and string quartet (2005)
- 5 miniatures for string quartet (2005)
- String Quartet No.2 "Rien, il n'y a rien de plus beau" (2006)
- Là for guitar (2006)
- 2'35" (2 Minutes 35 Seconds) for bassoon solo, bass flute, bass clarinet and trumpet (2007)
- Le dit d'elle for viola solo (1995, 2007)
- Le chant de la rose for kawala, clarinet and kanun (2008)
- Scr(i)pt for solo percussionist (vibraphone, cymbals, triangles, crotales, wood-blocks, bongos, bass drum), soprano singer, piccolo flute, oboe, clarinet and double bass (2009)

Organ

- Jetées (1987)

Piano

- Solstice for piano and tape (1971–1976)
- 4 Miniatures (1976)
- Pour main gauche seule (1976)
- Sonate (1978)
- Trois Tableau for 2 pianos (1993)
- Les amours du poète for piano 4-hands (1994)
- Fantaisie concertante for piano and Baroque string quartet (1998–1999)
- Fantaisie concertante for piano solo (1999–2000)

Vocal

- Mélodies for soprano or tenor and piano (1966)
- Mélodies 2 for soprano or tenor and piano (1966)
- La Harpe du silence, Suite lyrique for soprano, contralto, narrator and instrumental ensemble (1966); text by Blaise Cendrars
- Année, 4 Symphonic Movements for soprano, contralto and orchestra (1970); text by Philippe Henri Jaccottet
- Ecritures, Opéra parlé for voice and tape (1975)
- La cantate des évantails for 3 children's voices and instrumental ensemble (1984)
- Du blanc dans le noir for 2 children's voices and a small ensemble (1991); words by J.M.G. Le Clézio
- Concerto lirico for soprano, cello and percussion (1995)
- Deux airs for soprano, cello and percussion (1995)
- Judith et Holopherne, Melodrama for string orchestra, timbales and narrator (1996); words by François Debluë
- Wolkenblau for soprano, alto flute and guitar (1999–2000)
- It Was Not a Melody for soprano, flute, bass, viola, trumpet and electronic piano (2000)

Choral

- Eripe me, Domine (Psalm 140) for mixed double chorus a cappella (1978)
- Le regardeur infini, Six scenes for vocal ensemble, speaker, percussion and harpsichord (1987–1990); words by Victor Hugo
- S'achève ma voix for mixed chorus and orchestra (1991)
- Bruit d'ailes for 12-part vocal ensemble (1992); words by K. White and Blaise Cendrars
- Intermezzo for female chorus, flute, violin and harp (1996)
- Vers quel ciel éblouissant, Cantata for mixed chorus and ensemble (2003–2004)
- Intermezzo for a vocal ensemble and female voice (2005)
