= Evangelical Free Church of Geneva =

The Evangelical Free Church of Geneva (in French the Église évangélique libre de Genève) is a Reformed free church in Geneva, Switzerland. The church has six congregations in Onex, Versoix, Buix, Rive Droite, Carouge, l'Oratoire with a combined membership of 1,000.

The church was founded in 1849 during a period of spiritual renewal, which begun in the early 19th century. This movement began in the Church of Geneva, resulting in the dismissal of several pastors. In the 1940s, the church had intended to merge with the Reformed church in Geneva, but this proposition was declined. In 1978, a new parish in Onex was formed. And in 1994, a sixth parish was formed in Versoix.

The church has charismatic beliefs.
