= Onex, Switzerland =

Onex
- Municipality
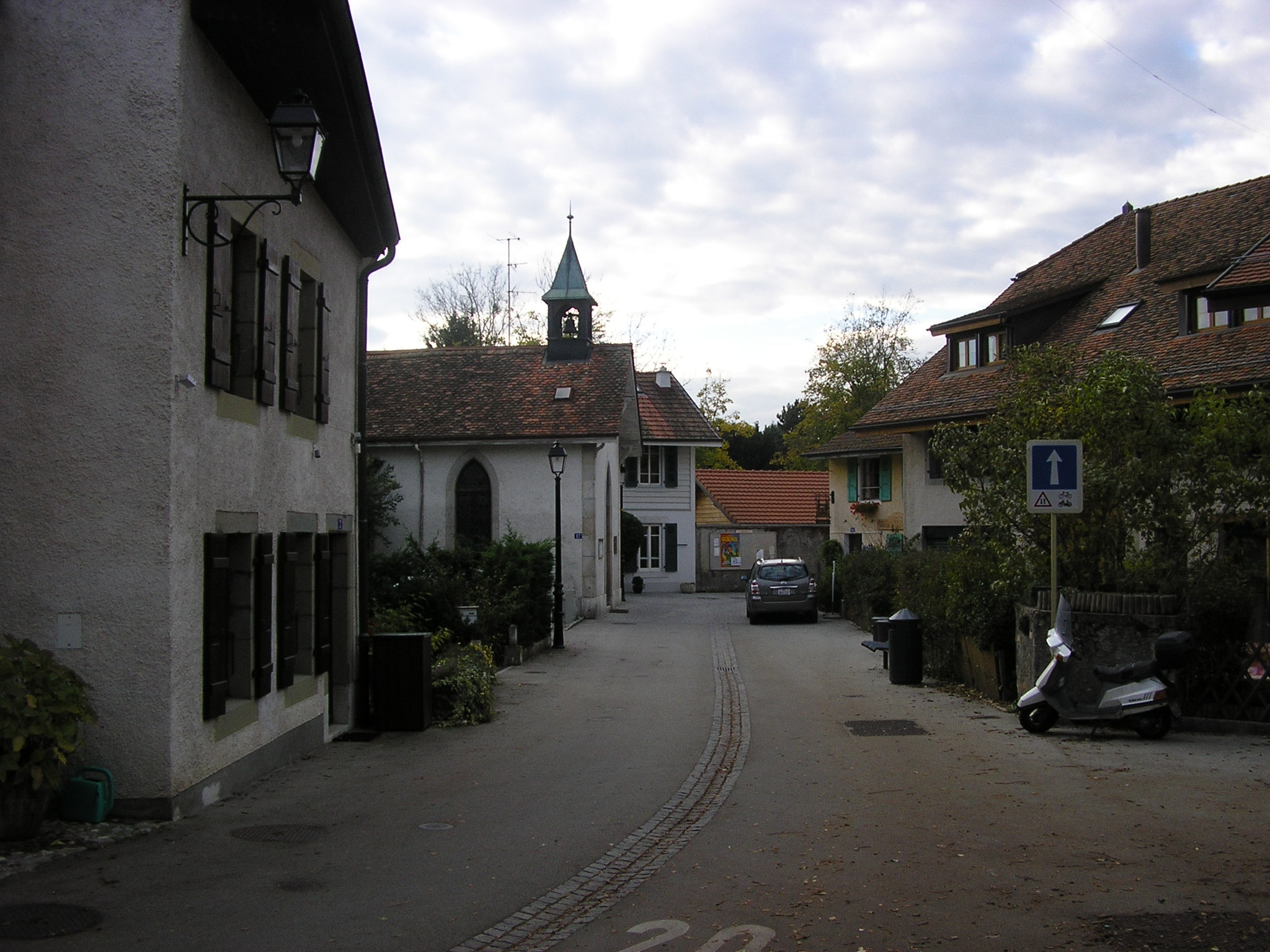

- Flag Coat of arms
- Location of Onex
- Location within Switzerland Location within Canton of Geneva
- Coordinates: 46°11′N 06°06′E
- Country: Switzerland
- Canton: Geneva
- District: n.a.

Area
  - Total: 2.82 km^{2} (1.09 sq mi)
- Elevation: 427 m (1,401 ft)

Population (December 2020)
  - Total: 18,933
  - Density: 6,710/km^{2} (17,400/sq mi)
- Time zone: UTC+01:00 (CET)
  - Summer (DST): UTC+02:00 (CEST)
- Postal code: 1213
- SFOS number: 6631
- ISO 3166 code: CH-GE
- Surrounded by: Bernex, Confignon, Lancy, Plan-les-Ouates, Vernier
- Twin towns: Liestal (Switzerland), Massagno (Switzerland), Bandol (France)
- Website: www.onex.ch

Onex (French pronunciation: [ɔne]; Arpitan: Ônèx) is a municipality in the canton of Geneva in Switzerland.

== History ==
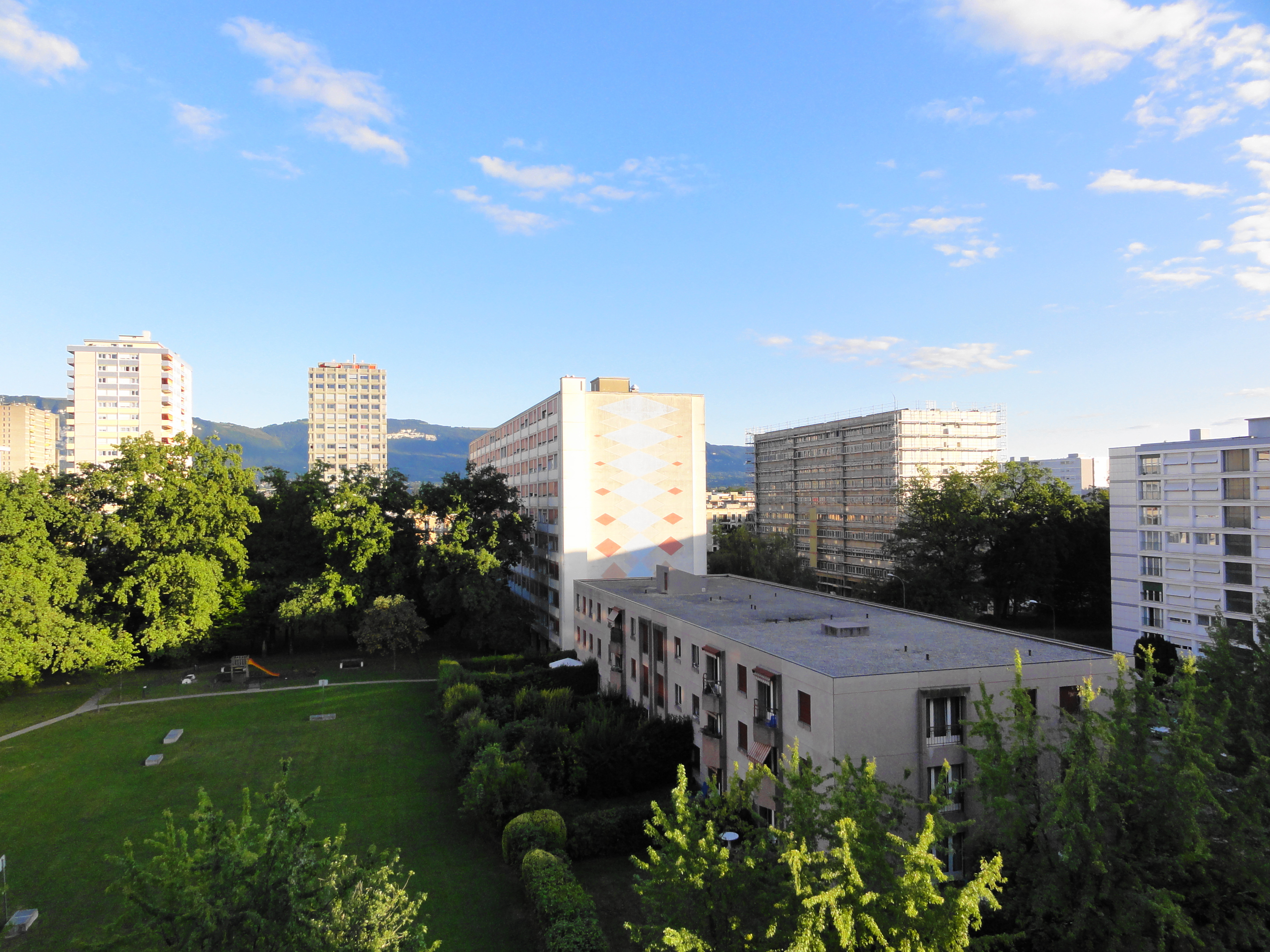
Apartment blocks of the Cité-Nouvelle

Onex is first mentioned in 1292 as Onay. It became an independent municipality in 1851 when the municipality of Onex-Confignon split into the two municipalities of Onex and Confignon.

Until the 1960s the municipality remained a relatively small agricultural village. This changed when, at the urging of the canton, it sold approximately 11 hectares (27 acres) to the Cité-Nouvelle Foundation to build public housing. The Foundation built a number of nine to fifteen story apartment blocks on the land to help relieve a housing shortfall in Geneva. The Cité-Nouvelle was one of the first high density housing blocks on the outskirts of Geneva. Between 1950 and 1970 the population increased from less than 1000 to over 13,000. With the population growth, the village economy changed from primarily agricultural to a commuter and service economy. In 2000 about 90% of the population commuted to jobs outside the municipality and by 2005 about 90% of the jobs in the municipality were in the service sector.

== Geography ==
Onex has an area, as of 2009, of 2.82 square kilometers (1.09 sq mi). Of this area, 0.17 km^{2} (0.066 sq mi) or 6.0% is used for agricultural purposes, while 0.37 km^{2} (0.14 sq mi) or 13.1% is forested. Of the rest of the land, 2.19 km^{2} (0.85 sq mi) or 77.7% is settled (buildings or roads), 0.1 km^{2} (25 acres) or 3.5% is either rivers or lakes.

Of the built up area, housing and buildings made up 51.1% and transportation infrastructure made up 13.5%. while parks, green belts and sports fields made up 12.8%. Out of the forested land, 12.1% of the total land area is heavily forested and 1.1% is covered with orchards or small clusters of trees. Of the agricultural land, 1.1% is used for growing crops and 3.9% is pastures, while 1.1% is used for orchards or vine crops. All the water in the municipality is flowing water.

The municipality is located on the left bank of the Rhone river.

The municipality of Onex consists of the sub-sections or villages of Cressy - Marais, Evaux, Cité-Nouvelle, Gros-Chêne, Pré-Longet, Belle-Cour and Onex - village.

== Demographics ==
Largest groups of foreign residents 2013
Nationality	Amount	% total (population)
Portugal	1,974	11.0
Italy	943	5.2
Spain	664	3.7
France	562	3.1
Kosovo	363	2.0
Germany	123	0.7
Brazil	122	0.7
UK	115	0.6
Turkey	106	0.6
Serbia	89	0.5
Morocco	61	0.3
Tunisia	60	0.3
Eritrea	52	0.3
Belgium	48	0.3
Poland	48	0.3
Colombia	43	0.2
Bolivia	42	0.2
China	42	0.2
Russia	41	0.2
Peru	40	0.2

Onex has a population (as of December 2020) of 18,933. As of 2008, 33.7% of the population are resident foreign nationals. Over the last 10 years (1999–2009) the population has changed at a rate of 6.2%. It has changed at a rate of 1.8% due to migration and at a rate of 3.9% due to births and deaths.

Most of the population (as of 2000) speaks French (13,064 or 79.6%), with Italian being second most common (767 or 4.7%) and Portuguese being third (692 or 4.2%). There are 538 people who speak German and 8 people who speak Romansh.

As of 2008, the gender distribution of the population was 48.1% male and 51.9% female. The population was made up of 5,185 Swiss men (29.4% of the population) and 3,304 (18.7%) non-Swiss men. There were 6,173 Swiss women (34.9%) and 3,001 (17.0%) non-Swiss women. Of the population in the municipality 2,810 or about 17.1% were born in Onex and lived there in 2000. There were 4,177 or 25.4% who were born in the same canton, while 2,565 or 15.6% were born somewhere else in Switzerland, and 6,156 or 37.5% were born outside of Switzerland.

In 2008 there were 125 live births to Swiss citizens and 57 births to non-Swiss citizens, and in same time span there were 105 deaths of Swiss citizens and 26 non-Swiss citizen deaths. Ignoring immigration and emigration, the population of Swiss citizens increased by 20 while the foreign population increased by 31. There were 54 Swiss men and 55 Swiss women who emigrated from Switzerland. At the same time, there were 36 non-Swiss men and 63 non-Swiss women who immigrated from another country to Switzerland. The total Swiss population change in 2008 (from all sources, including moves across municipal borders) was an increase of 32 and the non-Swiss population decreased by 62 people. This represents a population growth rate of -0.2%.

The age distribution of the population (as of 2000) is children and teenagers (0–19 years old) make up 22.6% of the population, while adults (20–64 years old) make up 62.8% and seniors (over 64 years old) make up 14.6%.

As of 2000, there were 6,517 people who were single and never married in the municipality. There were 7,839 married individuals, 838 widows or widowers and 1,225 individuals who are divorced.

As of 2000, there were 7,236 private households in the municipality, and an average of 2.2 persons per household. There were 2,740 households that consist of only one person and 376 households with five or more people. Out of a total of 7,356 households that answered this question, 37.2% were households made up of just one person and there were 21 adults who lived with their parents. Of the rest of the households, there are 1,765 married couples without children, 2,111 married couples with children There were 522 single parents with a child or children. There were 77 households that were made up of unrelated people and 120 households that were made up of some sort of institution or another collective housing.

In 2000 there were 655 single family homes (or 60.0% of the total) out of a total of 1,091 inhabited buildings. There were 331 multi-family buildings (30.3%), along with 67 multi-purpose buildings that were mostly used for housing (6.1%) and 38 other use buildings (commercial or industrial) that also had some housing (3.5%). Of the single family homes 42 were built before 1919, while 127 were built between 1990 and 2000. The greatest number of single family homes (127) were built between 1971 and 1980. The most multi-family homes (153) were built between 1961 and 1970 and the next most (70) were built between 1971 and 1980. There were 17 multi-family houses built between 1996 and 2000.

In 2000 there were 7,525 apartments in the municipality. The most common apartment size was 3 rooms of which there were 2,406. There were 887 single room apartments and 1,078 apartments with five or more rooms. Of these apartments, a total of 7,109 apartments (94.5% of the total) were permanently occupied, while 364 apartments (4.8%) were seasonally occupied and 52 apartments (0.7%) were empty. As of 2009, the construction rate of new housing units was 0.2 new units per 1000 residents. The vacancy rate for the municipality, in 2010, was 0.09%.

The historical population is given in the following chart:

== Sights ==
The entire village of Onex is designated as part of the Inventory of Swiss Heritage Sites.

== Politics ==
In the 2007 federal election the most popular party was the SVP which received 25.28% of the vote. The next three most popular parties were the SP (20.77%), the Green Party (14.63%) and the LPS Party (10.43%). In the federal election, a total of 4,175 votes were cast, and the voter turnout was 45.8%.

In the 2009 Grand Conseil election, there were a total of 9,041 registered voters of which 3,415 (37.8%) voted. The most popular party in the municipality for this election was the MCG with 20.1% of the ballots. In the canton-wide election they received the third highest proportion of votes. The second most popular party was the Les Socialistes (with 12.7%), they were fourth in the canton-wide election, while the third most popular party was the Les Verts (with 12.6%), they were second in the canton-wide election.

For the 2009 Conseil d'État election, there were a total of 9,048 registered voters of which 4,168 (46.1%) voted.

In 2011, all the municipalities held local elections, and in Onex there were 29 spots open on the municipal council. There were a total of 12,535 registered voters of which 4,855 (38.7%) voted. Out of the 4,855 votes, there were 37 blank votes, 52 null or unreadable votes and 354 votes with a name that was not on the list.

== Economy ==
As of 2010, Onex had an unemployment rate of 6.8%. As of 2008, there were 23 people employed in the primary economic sector and about 4 businesses involved in this sector. 665 people were employed in the secondary sector and there were 75 businesses in this sector. 2,238 people were employed in the tertiary sector, with 263 businesses in this sector. There were 7,841 residents of the municipality who were employed in some capacity, of which females made up 45.9% of the workforce.

In 2008 the total number of full-time equivalent jobs was 2,490. The number of jobs in the primary sector was 16, all of which were in agriculture. The number of jobs in the secondary sector was 650 of which 23 or (3.5%) were in manufacturing and 628 (96.6%) were in construction. The number of jobs in the tertiary sector was 1,824. In the tertiary sector; 220 or 12.1% were in wholesale or retail sales or the repair of motor vehicles, 38 or 2.1% were in the movement and storage of goods, 121 or 6.6% were in a hotel or restaurant, 13 or 0.7% were in the information industry, 9 or 0.5% were the insurance or financial industry, 181 or 9.9% were technical professionals or scientists, 192 or 10.5% were in education and 592 or 32.5% were in health care.

In 2000, there were 1,271 workers who commuted into the municipality and 6,913 workers who commuted away. The municipality is a net exporter of workers, with about 5.4 workers leaving the municipality for every one entering. About 7.0% of the workforce coming into Onex are coming from outside Switzerland, while 0.0% of the locals commute out of Switzerland for work. Of the working population, 31% used public transportation to get to work, and 51.8% used a private car. The canton of Onex is served by the 14 tram in the Genevan tram system.

== Religion ==
From the 2000 census, 7,397 or 45.1% were Roman Catholic, while 2,599 or 15.8% belonged to the Swiss Reformed Church. Of the rest of the population, there were 118 members of an Orthodox church (or about 0.72% of the population), there were 22 individuals (or about 0.13% of the population) who belonged to the Christian Catholic Church, and there were 330 individuals (or about 2.01% of the population) who belonged to another Christian church. There are one congregation in the city of the Evangelical Free Church of Geneva. There were 43 individuals (or about 0.26% of the population) who were Jewish, and 695 (or about 4.23% of the population) who were Islamic. There were 44 individuals who were Buddhist, 23 individuals who were Hindu and 28 individuals who belonged to another church. 3,665 (or about 22.32% of the population) belonged to no church, are agnostic or atheist, and 1,455 individuals (or about 8.86% of the population) did not answer the question.

== Education ==
In Onex about 5,295 or (32.2%) of the population have completed non-mandatory upper secondary education, and 2,131 or (13.0%) have completed additional higher education (either university or a Fachhochschule). Of the 2,131 who completed tertiary schooling, 41.0% were Swiss men, 34.0% were Swiss women, 15.7% were non-Swiss men and 9.3% were non-Swiss women.

During the 2009–2010 school year there were a total of 3,517 students in the Onex school system. The education system in the Canton of Geneva allows young children to attend two years of non-obligatory Kindergarten. During that school year, there were 276 children who were in a pre-kindergarten class. The canton's school system provides two years of non-mandatory kindergarten and requires students to attend six years of primary school, with some of the children attending smaller, specialized classes. In Onex there were 579 students in kindergarten or primary school and 98 students were in the special, smaller classes. The secondary school program consists of three lower, obligatory years of schooling, followed by three to five years of optional, advanced schools. There were 579 lower secondary students who attended school in Onex. There were 820 upper secondary students from the municipality along with 155 students who were in a professional, non-university track program. An additional 162 students attended a private school.

As of 2000, there were 349 students in Onex who came from another municipality, while 1,048 residents attended schools outside the municipality.

== Notable people ==
- William Lescaze (1896 in Onex – 1969 in New York) was a Swiss-born American architect, a pioneer of modernism in American architecture
- Walmar Wladimir Schwab (1902 in Moscow - 2000 in Onex) painter and print-maker in Paris during the 1920s
- Xavier Hochstrasser (born 1988 in Onex) a Swiss footballer who currently plays for FC Onex

== International relations ==
Onex is twinned with:

Bandol, France	Liestal, Switzerland

== Gallery ==
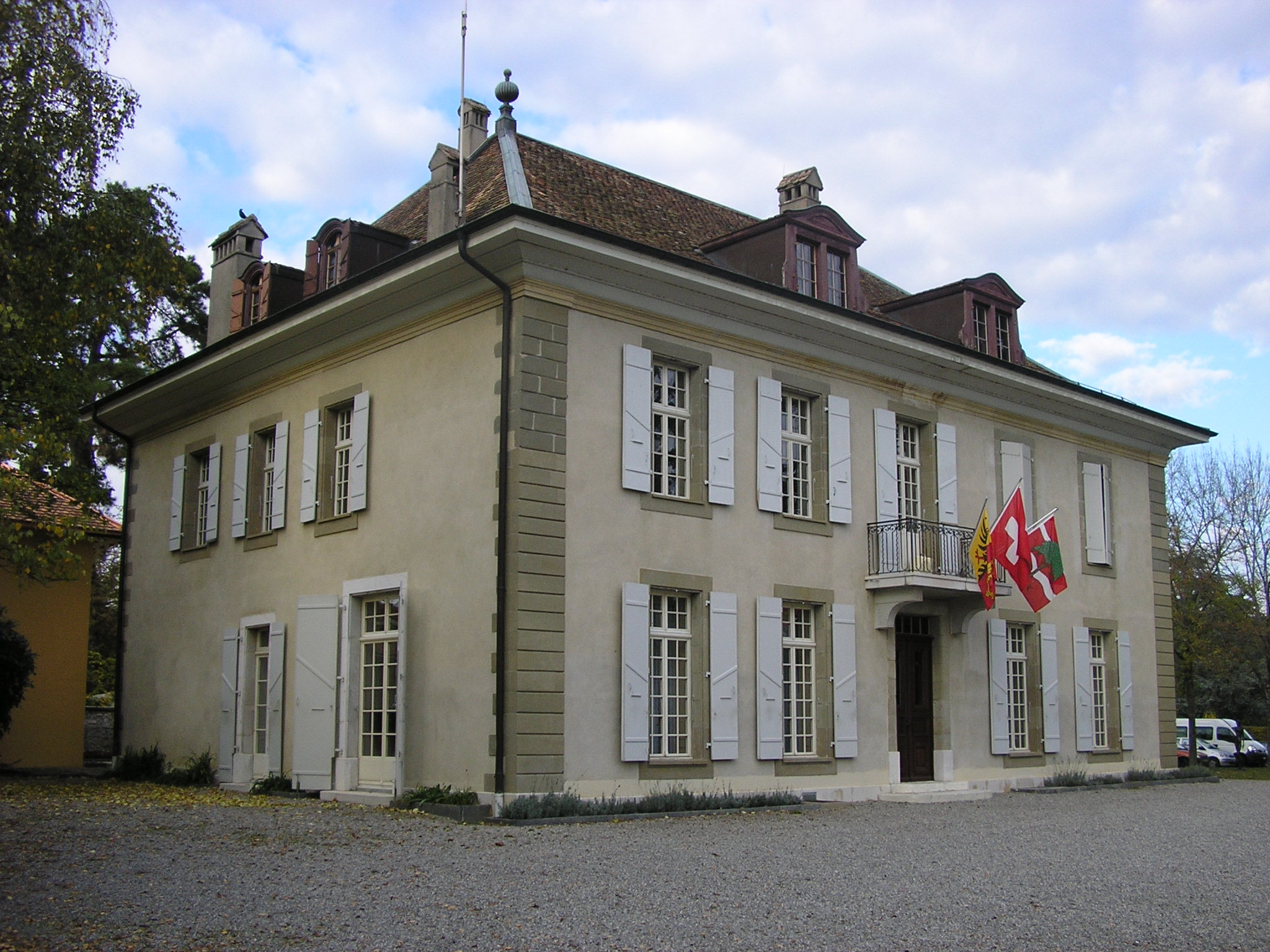
Onex town hall

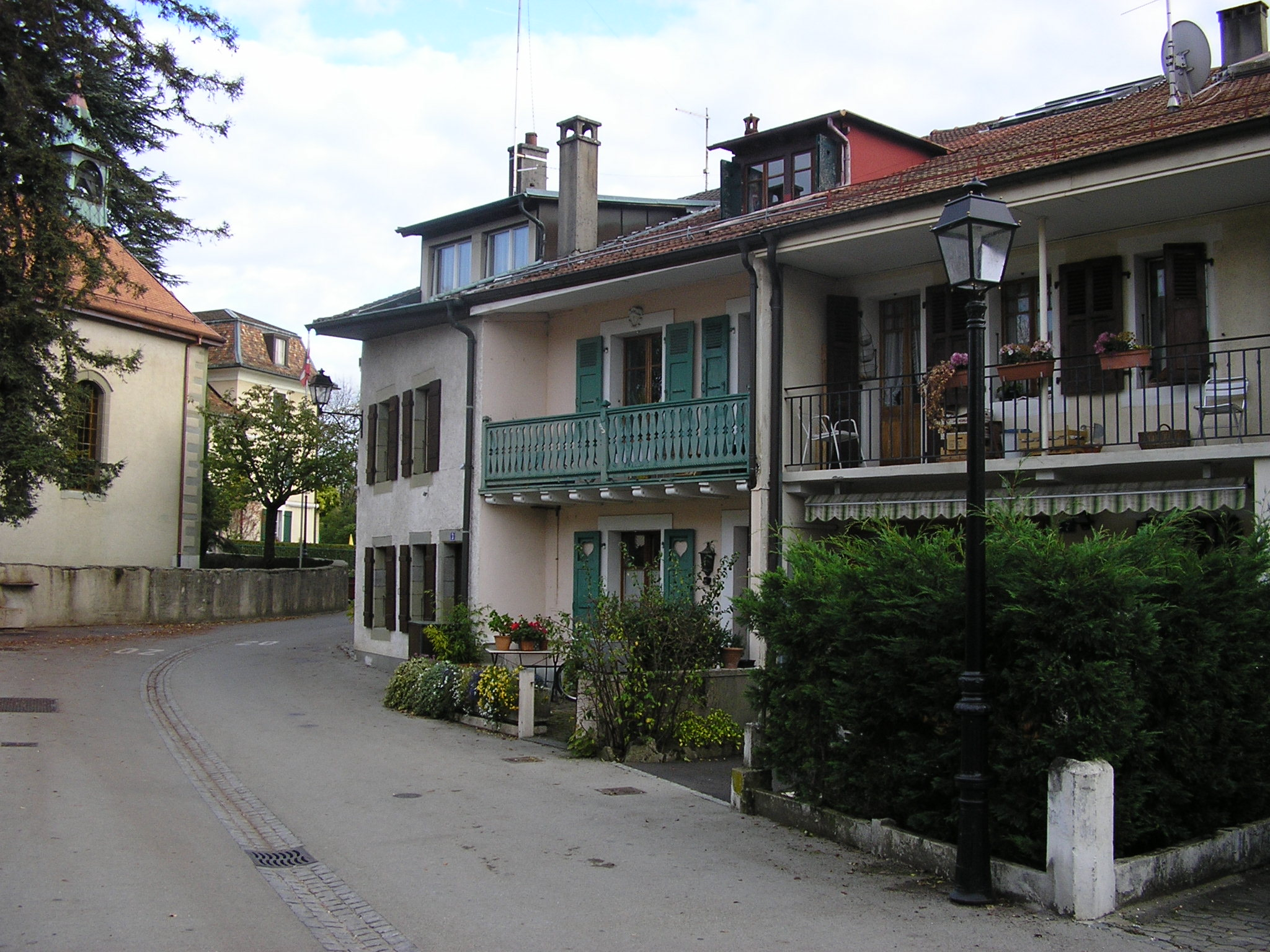
Houses in Onex

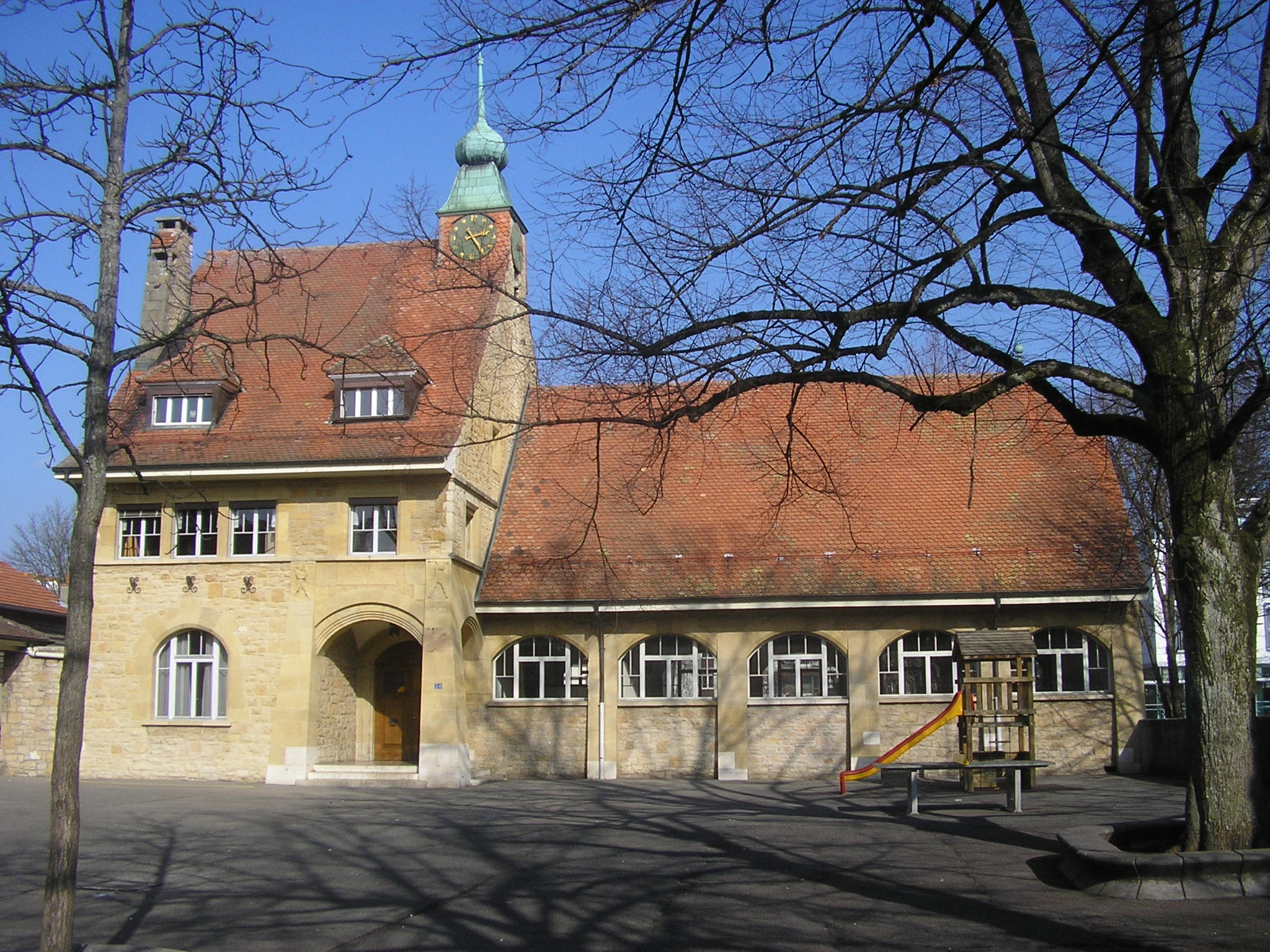
School building in Onex

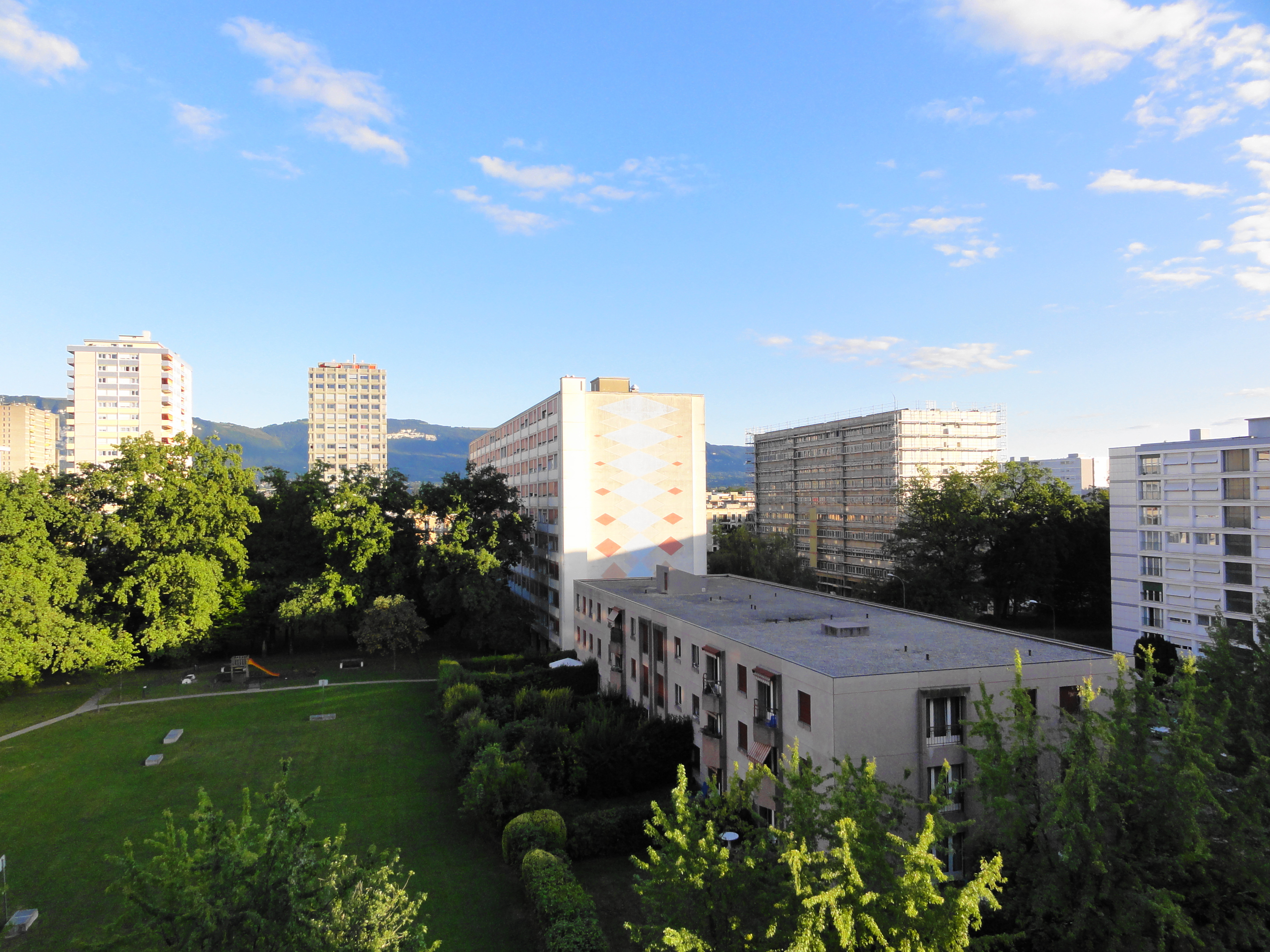
Cité-Nouvelle development in Onex, with the Mount Salève

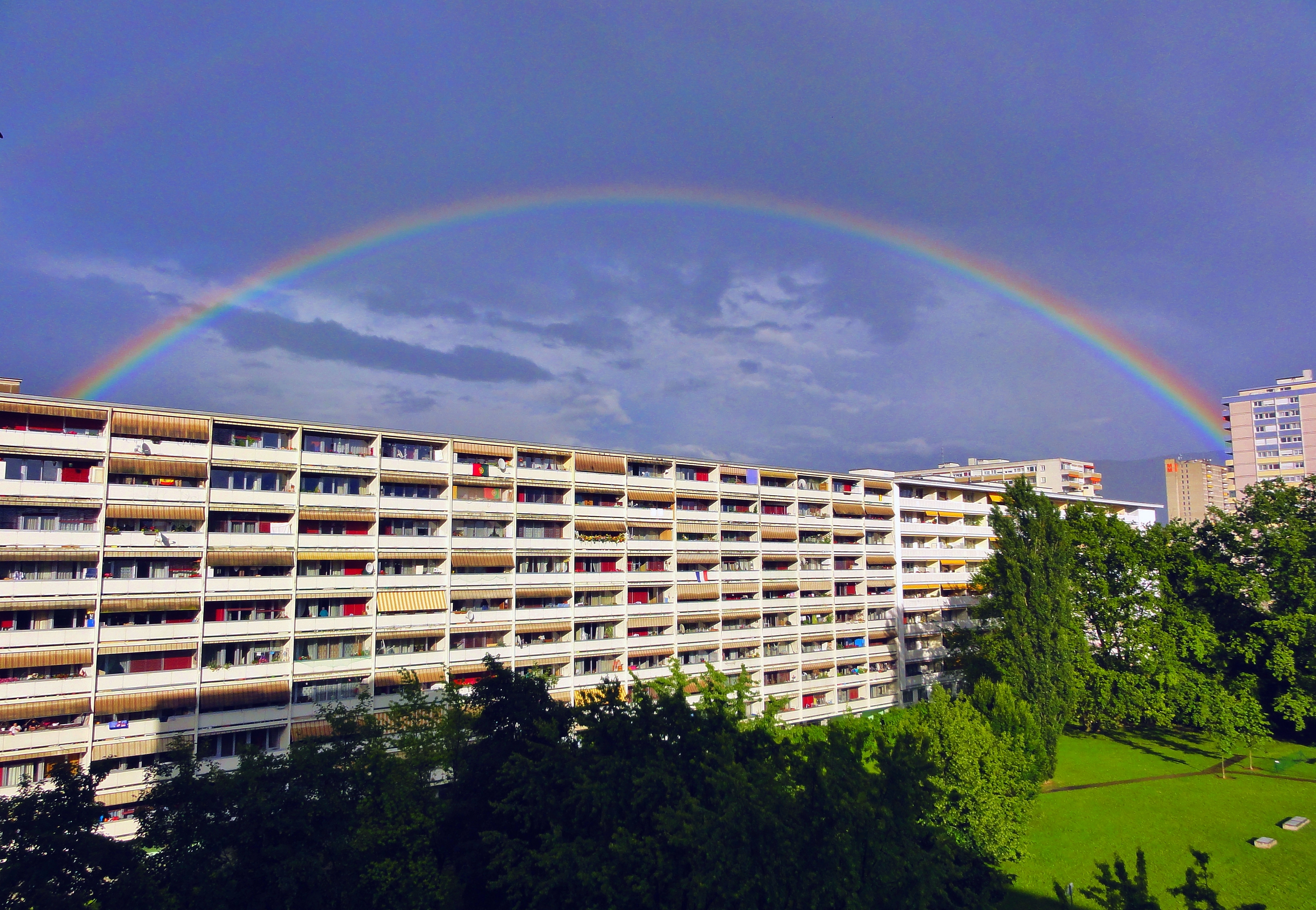
Rainbow in the Cité Nouvelle d'Onex-Lancy at Geneve

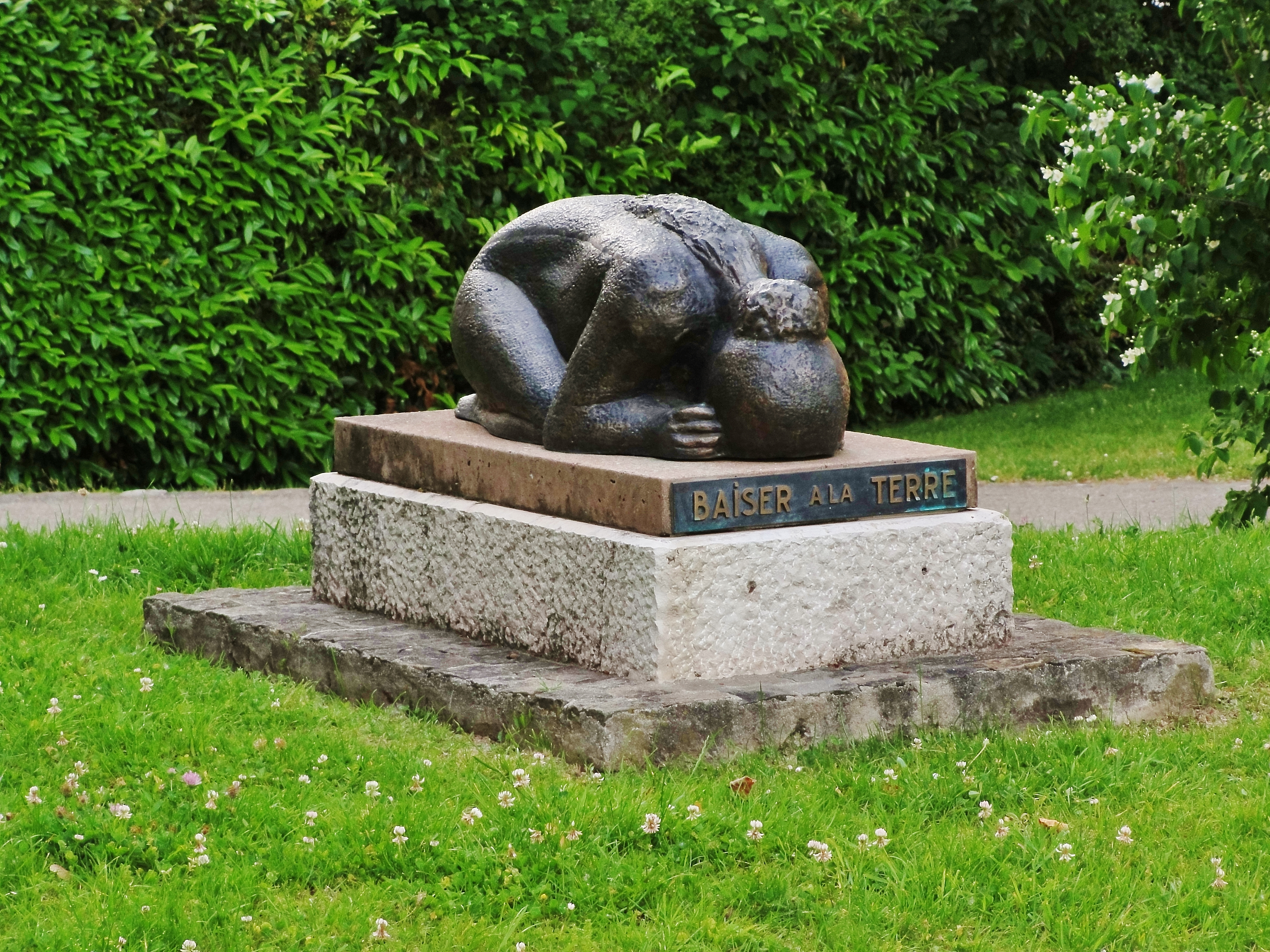
Kiss to the earth, statue from Dante Ghielmini, in the Cité Nouvelle d'Onex-Lancy at Geneve

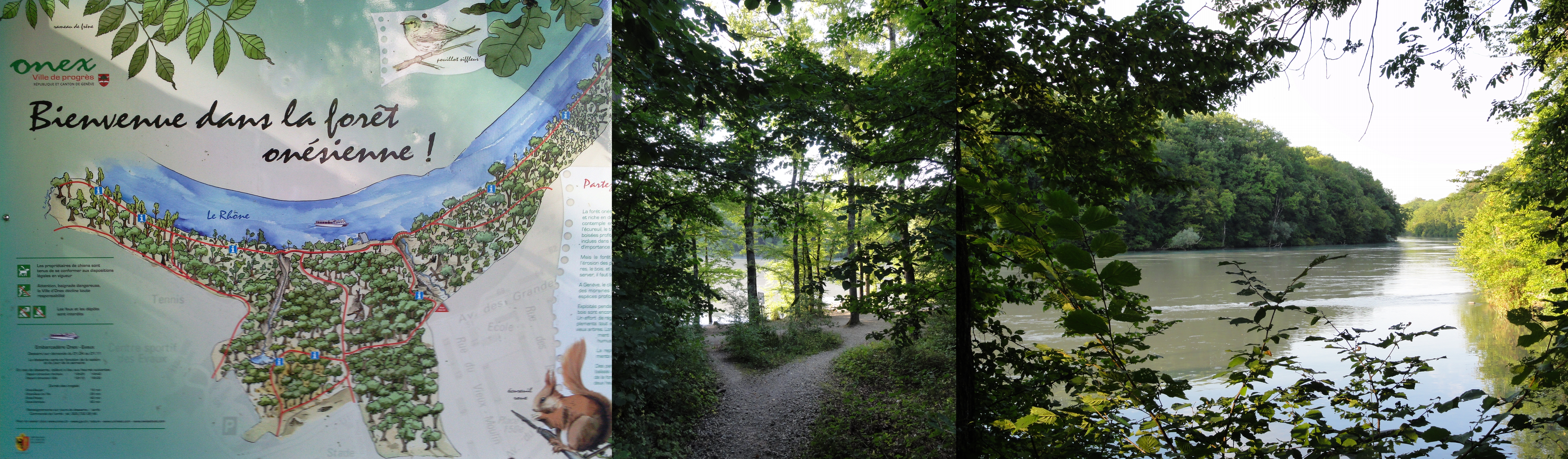
The Onésienne Forest and the Rhone river

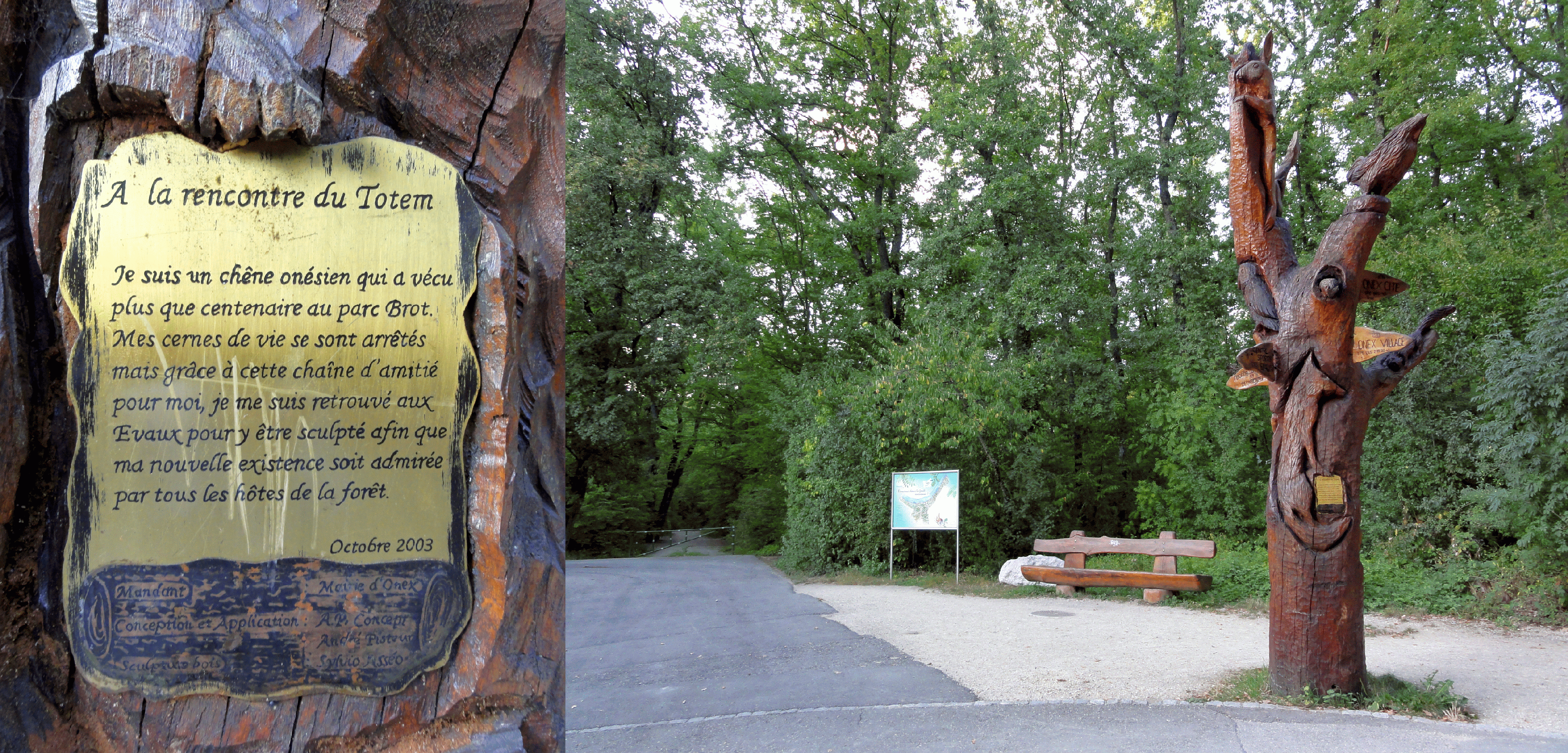
The Onésienne Forest Totem

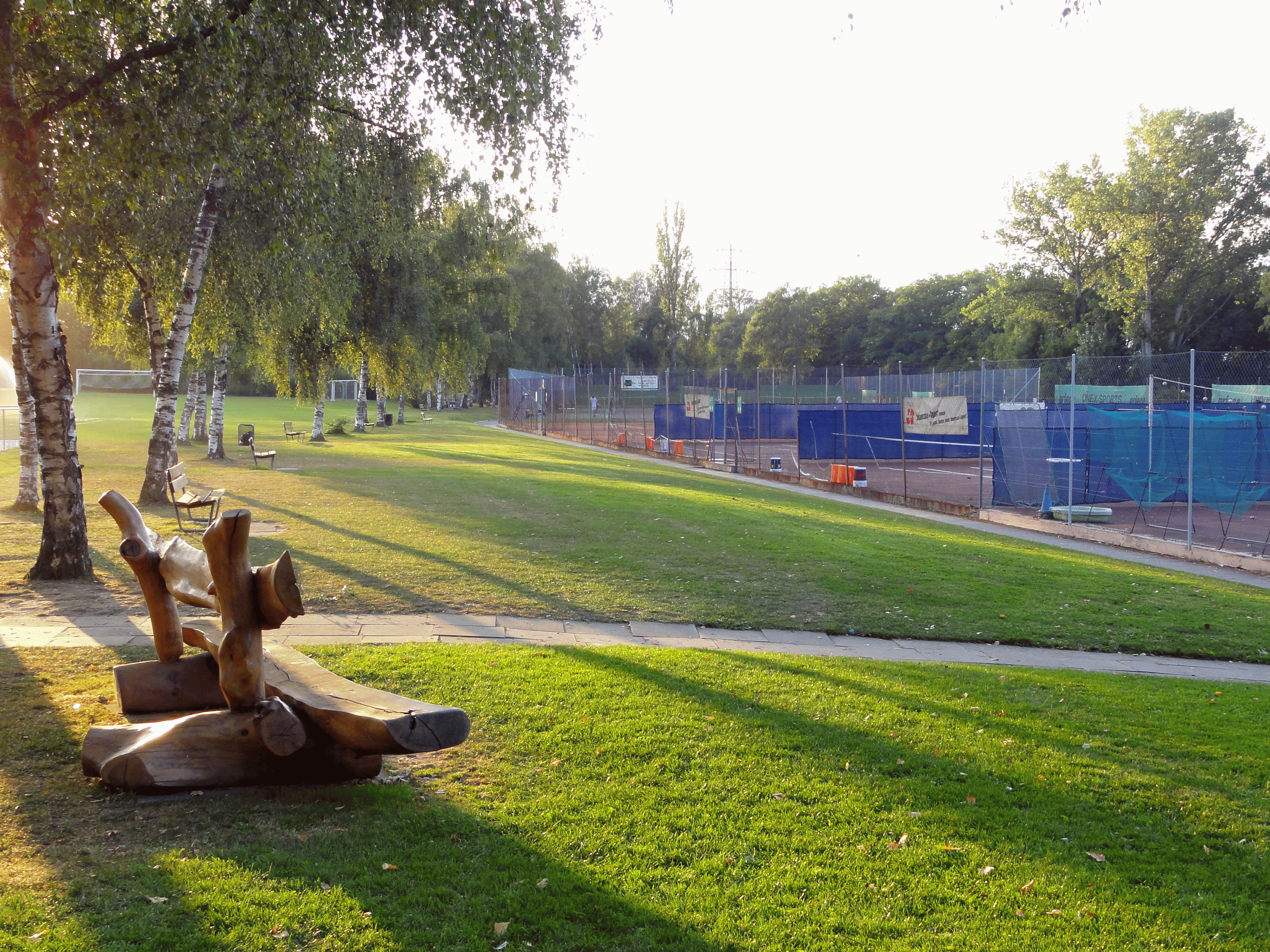
The Evaux park

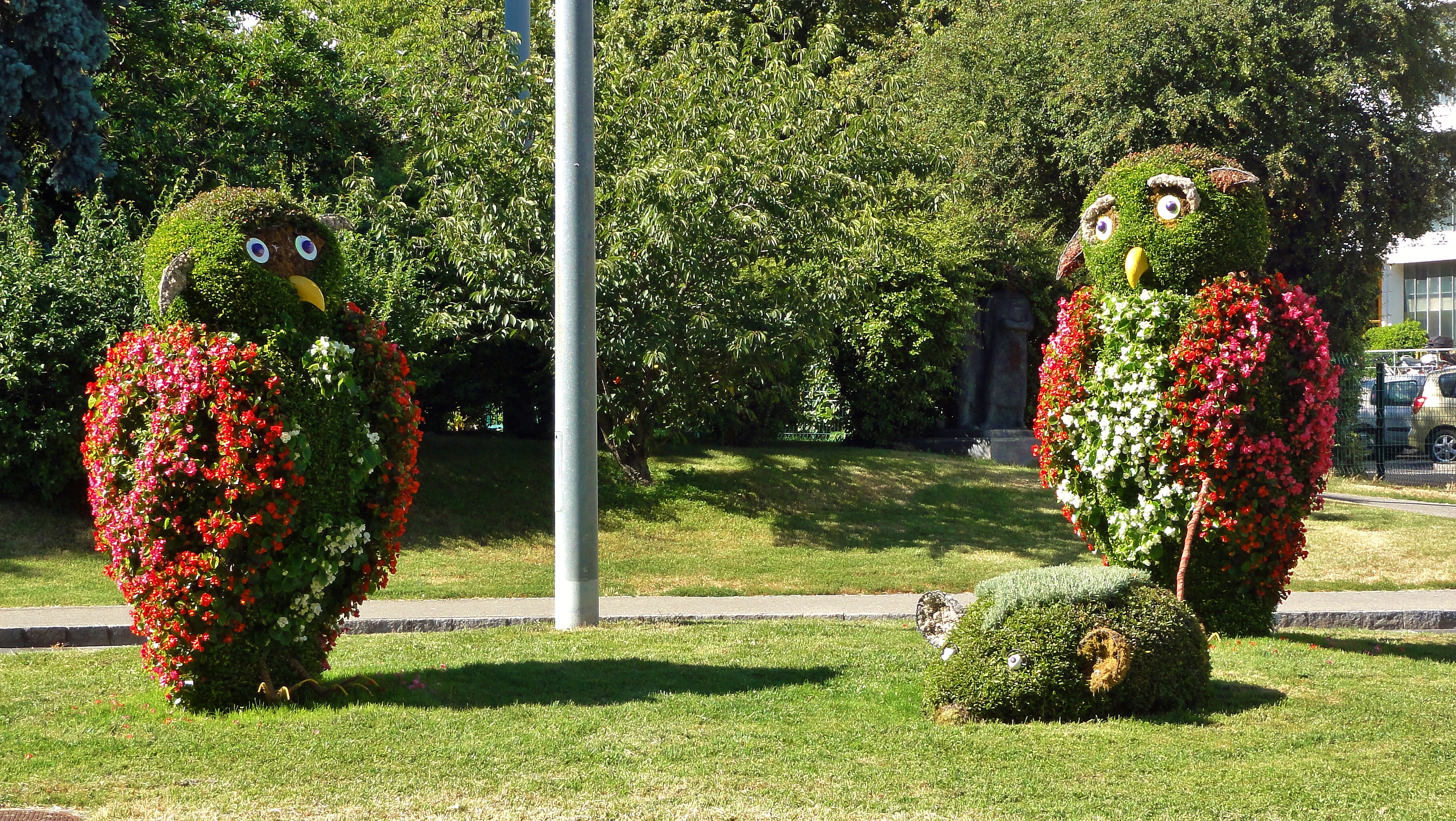
Street art at Onex

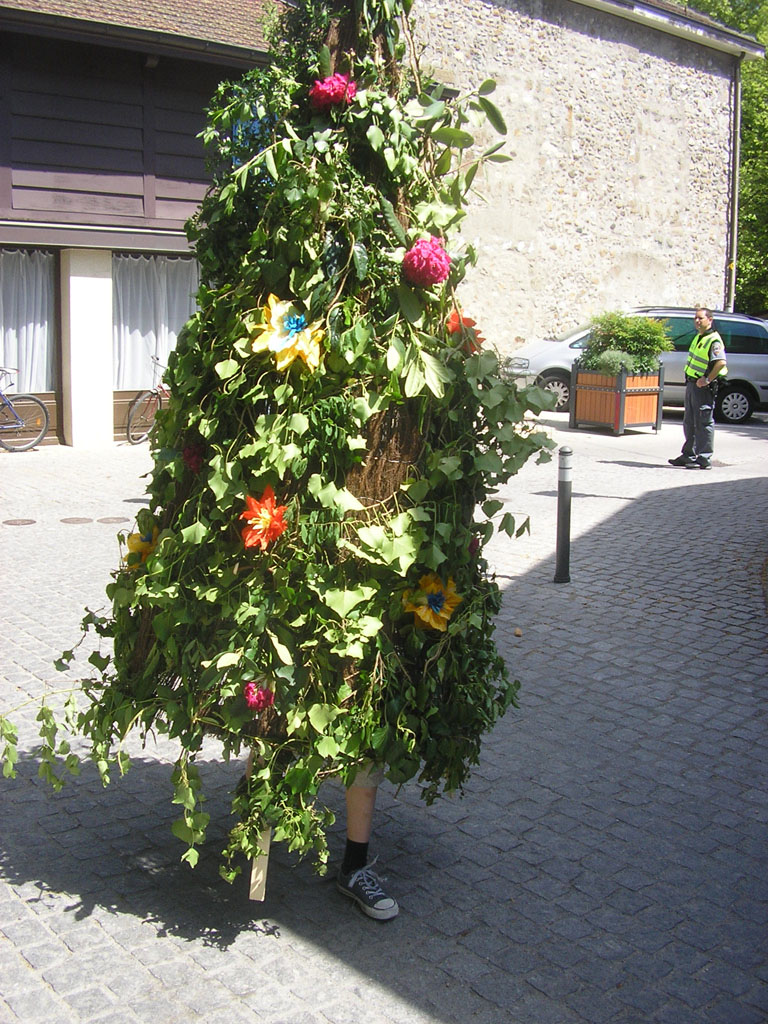
Jack in the green in Onex, 2011

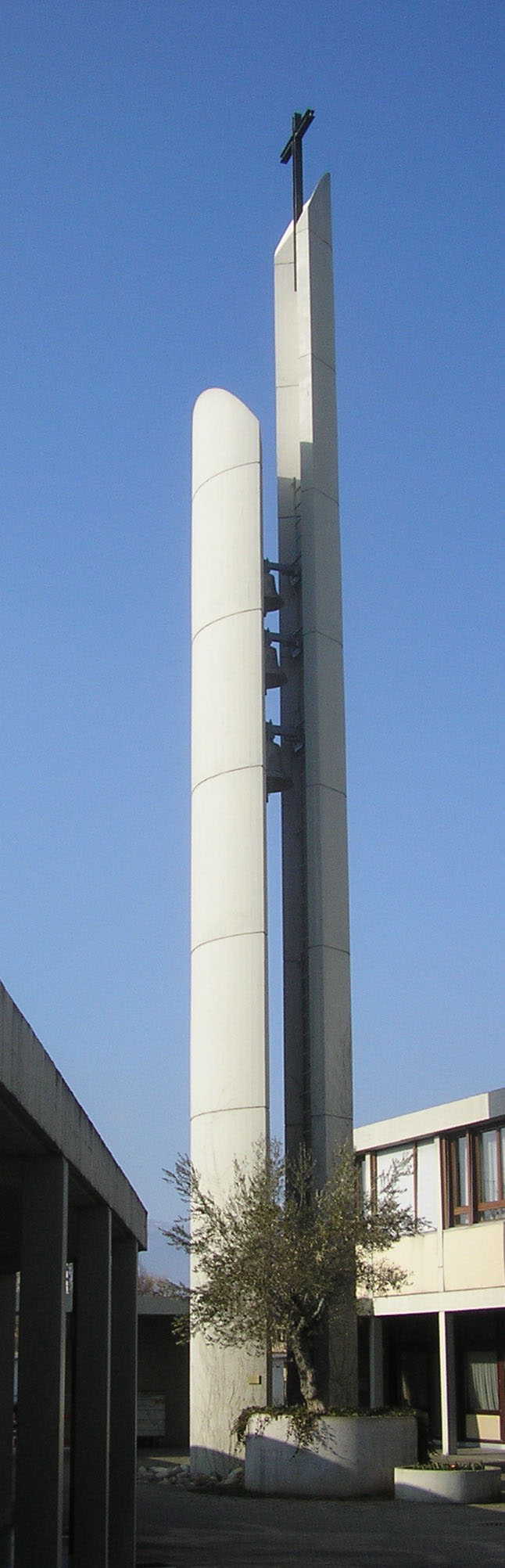
Bell Tower of the Catholic St. Martin's Church
