= Bernex, Switzerland =

Bernex
- Municipality
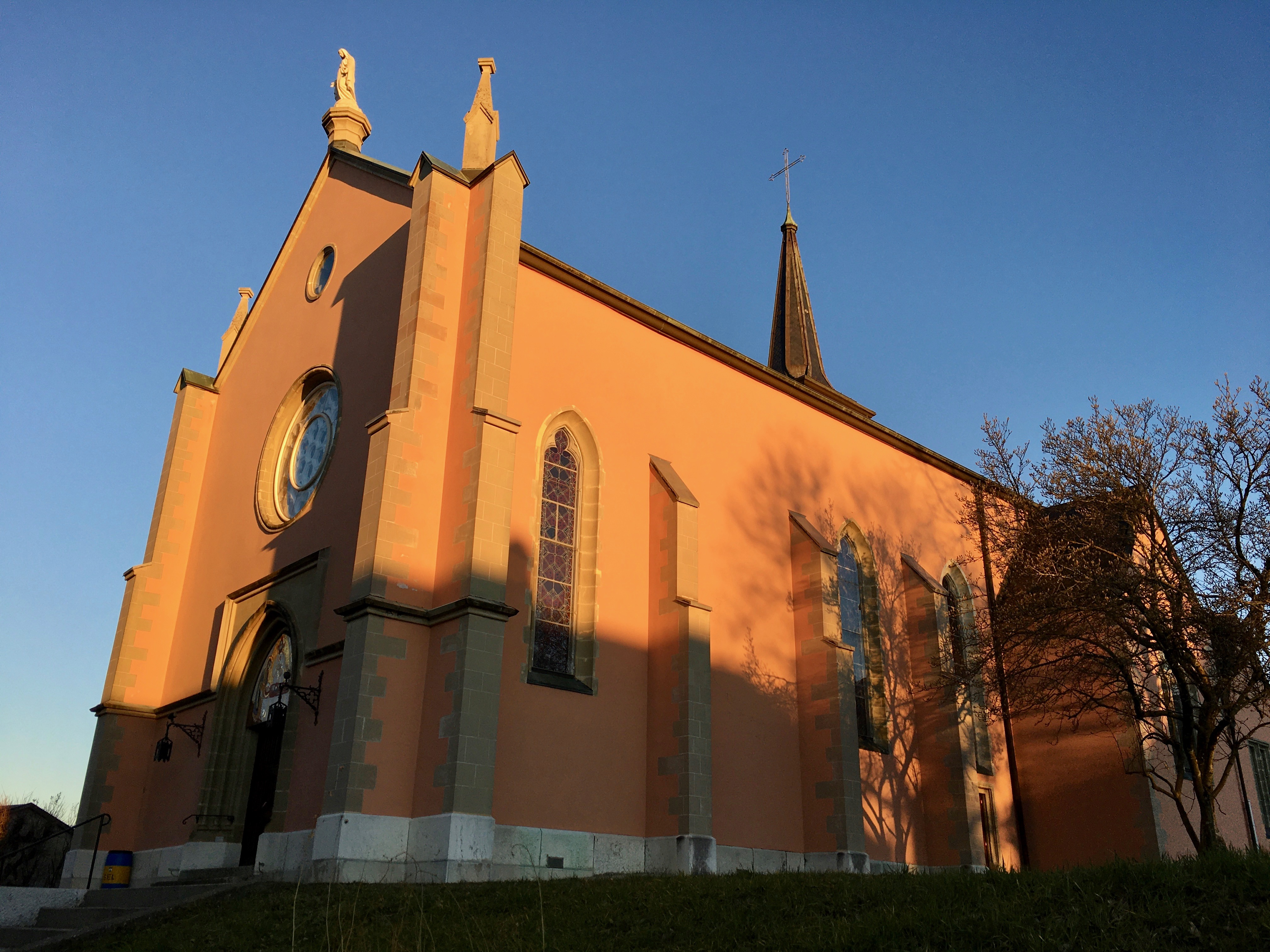
- Catholic Church of Bernex

- Flag Coat of arms
- Location of Bernex
- Location within Switzerland Location within Canton of Geneva
- Coordinates: 46°10′N 06°04′E
- Country: Switzerland
- Canton: Geneva
- District: n.a.

Government
  - Mayor: maire Cyril Huguenin PDC. (as of 1 June 2019 – 31 May 2020)

Area
  - Total: 12.95 km^{2} (5.00 sq mi)
- Elevation: 380 m (1,250 ft)

Population (December 2020)
  - Total: 10,258
  - Density: 792.1/km^{2} (2,052/sq mi)
- Demonym: Bernésien / Bernésienne
- Time zone: UTC+01:00 (CET)
  - Summer (DST): UTC+02:00 (CEST)
- Postal code: 1233
- SFOS number: 6607
- ISO 3166 code: CH-GE
- Localities: Bernex, Lully, Sézenove, Loëx, Chèvres, Cressy, Challoux
- Surrounded by: Aire-la-Ville, Cartigny, Confignon, Laconnex, Onex, Perly-Certoux, Satigny, Soral, Vernier
- Website: www.bernex.ch

Bernex (French pronunciation: [bɛʁnɛ]) is a municipality of the Canton of Geneva, Switzerland.

== History ==
Bernex is first mentioned in 1256 as Brenay. In 1793 the municipality of Bernex-Onex-Confignon was created. In 1850, Bernex separated from the other two, to form the municipalities of Bernex and Onex-Confignon.

== Geography ==
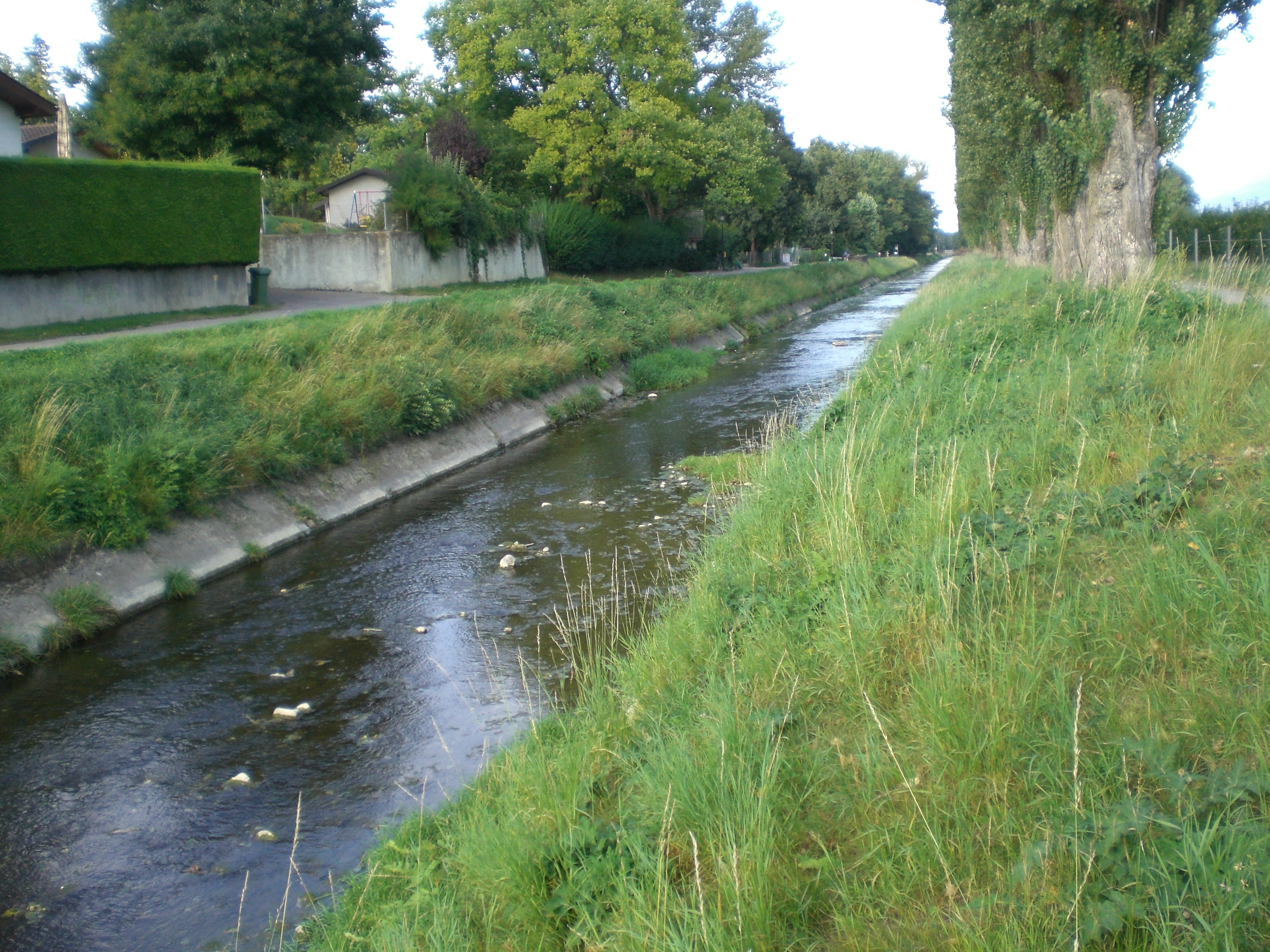
Aire river in the hamlet of Lully

Bernex has an area, as of 2009, of 12.95 square kilometers (5.00 sq mi). Of this area, 7.64 km^{2} (2.95 sq mi) or 59.0% is used for agricultural purposes, while 2.14 km^{2} (0.83 sq mi) or 16.5% is forested. Of the rest of the land, 2.76 km^{2} (1.07 sq mi) or 21.3% is settled (buildings or roads), 0.41 km^{2} (0.16 sq mi) or 3.2% is either rivers or lakes and 0.02 km^{2} (4.9 acres) or 0.2% is unproductive land.

Of the built up area, housing and buildings made up 10.9% and transportation infrastructure made up 7.3%. Power and water infrastructure as well as other special developed areas made up 1.4% of the area while parks, green belts and sports fields made up 1.5%. Out of the forested land, 14.9% of the total land area is heavily forested and 1.6% is covered with orchards or small clusters of trees. Of the agricultural land, 40.6% is used for growing crops and 5.5% is pastures, while 12.9% is used for orchards or vine crops. All the water in the municipality is flowing water.

The municipality is located on the left bank of the Rhone river. It consists of 7 villages of Bernex and the hamlets of Chèvres, Loëx, Lully, Cressy, Challoux, Sézenove. The 7 villages that compose Bernex's municipality are symbolically recalled on the coat of arms by the 7 flames of fire that burn at the top of the hill. This hill is the culminant point of the municipality (506 m, 1,660 ft), known as the Signal de Bernex, the second highest point of the Geneva canton.

The municipality of Bernex consists of the sub-sections or villages of Les Teppes, Châtillon, Chèvres, Loëx, Cressy - Molliers, Saint-Mathieu - Combes, Saint-Mathieu - stand, Luchepelet, Vailly, Le Gamay, La Naz - Guillon.

== Demographics ==
Largest groups of foreign residents 2013
Nationality	Amount	% total (population)
Portugal	394	4.0
France	314	3.2
Italy	254	2.6
Germany	126	1.3
Spain	126	1.3
UK	97	1.0
USA	52	0.5
Brazil	40	0.4
Belgium	37	0.4
Kosovo	37	0.4
Eritrea	32	0.3
Russia	31	0.3
Netherlands	28	0.3
Austria	25	0.2
Poland	24	0.2

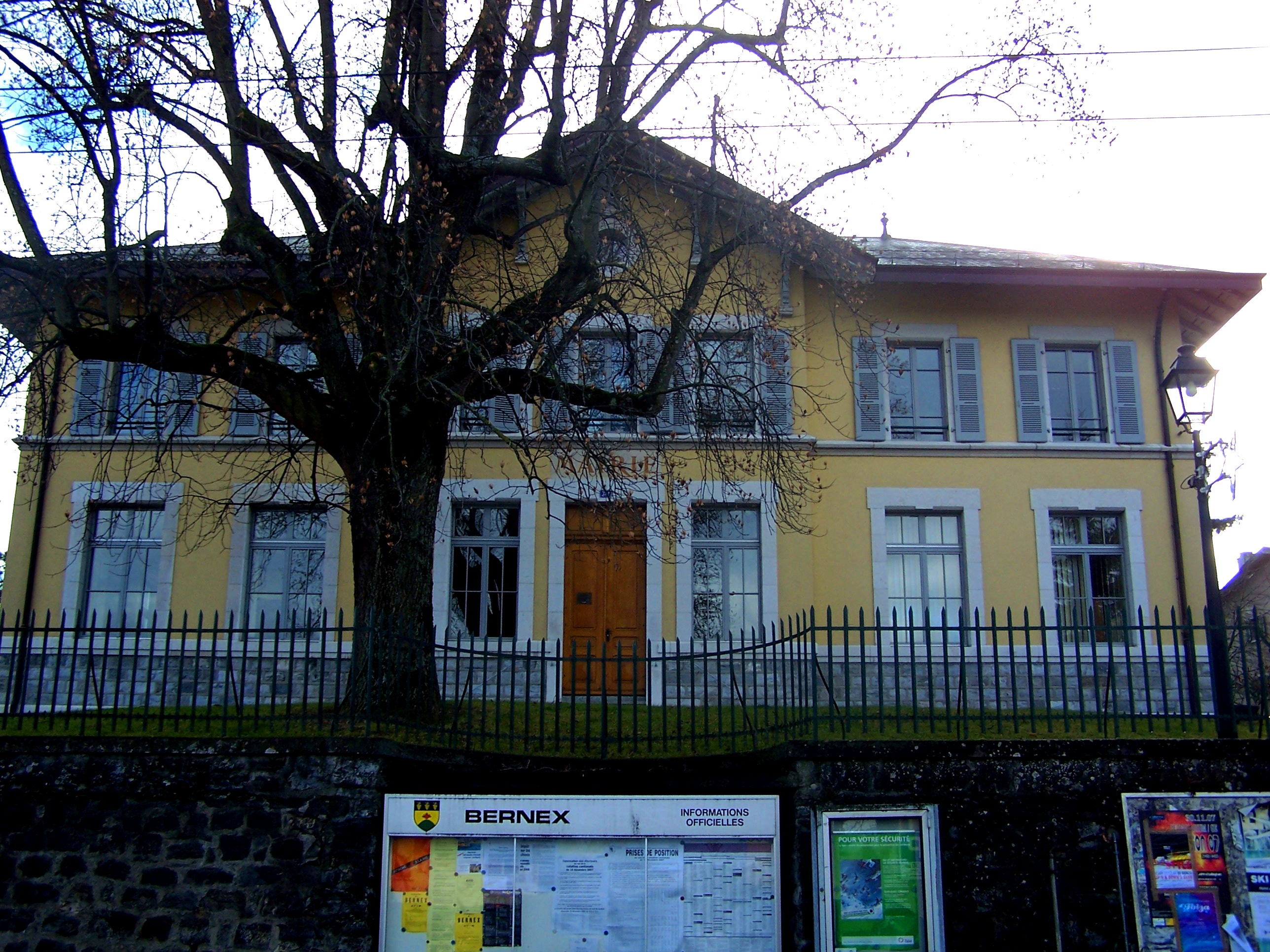
Mayor's house in Bernex

Bernex has a population (as of December 2020) of 10,258. As of 2008, 19.9% of the population are resident foreign nationals. Over the last 10 years (1999–2009 ) the population has changed at a rate of 11.2%. It has changed at a rate of 7.3% due to migration and at a rate of 1.5% due to births and deaths.

Most of the population (as of 2000) speaks French (7,759 or 85.5%), with German being second most common (421 or 4.6%) and English being third (193 or 2.1%). There are 3 people who speak Romansh and 168 people who speak Italian.

As of 2008, the gender distribution of the population was 49.2% male and 50.8% female. The population was made up of 3,650 Swiss men (37.4% of the population) and 1,151 (11.8%) non-Swiss men. There were 4,039 Swiss women (41.4%) and 915 (9.4%) non-Swiss women. Of the population in the municipality 1,839 or about 20.3% were born in Bernex and lived there in 2000. As of 2014, the origin of population was 44.7% were born in Geneva, 33% were born in other place of Switzerland, 22,4% were foreigners including 15,7% from European countries.

In 2008 there were 84 live births to Swiss citizens and 22 births to non-Swiss citizens, and in same time span there were 53 deaths of Swiss citizens and 7 non-Swiss citizen deaths. Ignoring immigration and emigration, the population of Swiss citizens increased by 31 while the foreign population increased by 15. There were 23 Swiss men and 27 Swiss women who emigrated from Switzerland. At the same time, there were 29 non-Swiss men and 37 non-Swiss women who immigrated from another country to Switzerland. The total Swiss population change in 2008 (from all sources, including moves across municipal borders) was an increase of 82 and the non-Swiss population increased by 80 people. This represents a population growth rate of 1.7%. The age distribution of the population (as of 2000) is children and teenagers (0–19 years old) make up 24.3% of the population, while adults (20–64 years old) make up 63.1% and seniors (over 64 years old) make up 12.6%.

As of 2000, there were 3,792 people who were single and never married in the municipality. There were 4,257 married individuals, 420 widows or widowers and 607 individuals who are divorced.

As of 2000, there were 3,335 private households in the municipality, and an average of 2.5 persons per household. There were 912 households that consist of only one person and 196 households with five or more people. Out of a total of 3,438 households that answered this question, 26.5% were households made up of just one person and there were 16 adults who lived with their parents. Of the rest of the households, there are 874 married couples without children, 1,226 married couples with children There were 274 single parents with a child or children. There were 33 households that were made up of unrelated people and 103 households that were made up of some sort of institution or another collective housing.

In 2000 there were 790 single family homes (or 60.6% of the total) out of a total of 1,304 inhabited buildings. There were 316 multi-family buildings (24.2%), along with 151 multi-purpose buildings that were mostly used for housing (11.6%) and 47 other use buildings (commercial or industrial) that also had some housing (3.6%). Of the single family homes 90 were built before 1919, while 105 were built between 1990 and 2000. The greatest number of single family homes (184) were built between 1971 and 1980.

In 2000 there were 3,456 apartments in the municipality. The most common apartment size was 4 rooms of which there were 951. There were 216 single room apartments and 958 apartments with five or more rooms. Of these apartments, a total of 3,211 apartments (92.9% of the total) were permanently occupied, while 205 apartments (5.9%) were seasonally occupied and 40 apartments (1.2%) were empty. As of 2009, the construction rate of new housing units was 1.7 new units per 1000 residents. The vacancy rate for the municipality, in 2010, was 0.21%.

The historical population is given in the following chart:

== Politics ==
The Administrative Council is composed of 3 administrative councillors, one of whom is appointed mayor for one year. The three councillors share the dicasteries for the 5-year legislature. The municipal council is composed of 25 members. It is headed by an office composed of a president, a vice-president and a secretary. Commissions, in which the parties elected to the municipal council are represented by 1 or 2 commissioners, in proportion to their number of plenary seats, deal with particular subjects such as finance, buildings, social affairs, etc.

In the 2007 federal election the most popular party was the SVP which received 19.7% of the vote. The next three most popular parties were the Green Party (18.31%), the SP (17.39%) and the LPS Party (13.79%). In the federal election, a total of 2,898 votes were cast, and the voter turnout was 49.7%.

In the 2009 Grand Conseil election, there were a total of 5,937 registered voters of which 2,486 (41.9%) voted. The most popular party in the municipality for this election was the PDC with 15.6% of the ballots. In the canton-wide election they received the fifth highest proportion of votes. The second most popular party was the Les Verts (with 15.4%), they were also second in the canton-wide election, while the third most popular party was the Libéral (with 14.0%), they were first in the canton-wide election.

For the 2009 Conseil d'État election, there were a total of 5,945 registered voters of which 2,954 (49.7%) voted.

In 2011, all the municipalities held local elections, and in Bernex there were 23 spots open on the municipal council. There were a total of 6,990 registered voters of which 3,180 (45.5%) voted. Out of the 3,180 votes, there were 13 blank votes, 16 null or unreadable votes and 322 votes with a name that was not on the list.

=== Administrative Council elections (15 March 2020 and 5 April 2020) ===
Results of the first round of the executive on 15 March 2020
Name of the candidates	Votes	Political Party	Status
ANTILLE-DUBOIS Guylaine	1,805	PS and Verts	Elected
VONLANTHEN Gilbert	1,771	PLR	Elected
HUGUENIN-BERGENAT Cyril	1,630	PDC	Elected
BAUMANN Karl-Anton	953	PLR	Not elected
ROSSINI Lionel-Pierre	600	UDC	Not elected
Absolute majority	1,598		
Participation	44.07%		

== Economy ==
As of 2010, Bernex had an unemployment rate of 3.6%. As of 2008, there were 170 people employed in the primary economic sector and about 34 businesses involved in this sector. 425 people were employed in the secondary sector and there were 59 businesses in this sector. 1,533 people were employed in the tertiary sector, with 184 businesses in this sector. There were 4,543 residents of the municipality who were employed in some capacity, of which females made up 44.8% of the workforce.

In 2008 the total number of full-time equivalent jobs was 1,858. The number of jobs in the primary sector was 148, of which 145 were in agriculture and 3 were in forestry or lumber production. The number of jobs in the secondary sector was 407 of which 118 or (29.0%) were in manufacturing and 241 (59.2%) were in construction. The number of jobs in the tertiary sector was 1,303. In the tertiary sector; 146 or 11.2% were in wholesale or retail sales or the repair of motor vehicles, 36 or 2.8% were in the movement and storage of goods, 46 or 3.5% were in a hotel or restaurant, 13 or 1.0% were in the information industry, 29 or 2.2% were the insurance or financial industry, 118 or 9.1% were technical professionals or scientists, 49 or 3.8% were in education and 662 or 50.8% were in health care.

In 2000, there were 1,690 workers who commuted into the municipality and 3,857 workers who commuted away. The municipality is a net exporter of workers, with about 2.3 workers leaving the municipality for every one entering. About 15.6% of the workforce coming into Bernex are coming from outside Switzerland, while 0.0% of the locals commute out of Switzerland for work. Of the working population, 20.3% used public transportation to get to work, and 63.8% used a private car.

== Religion ==
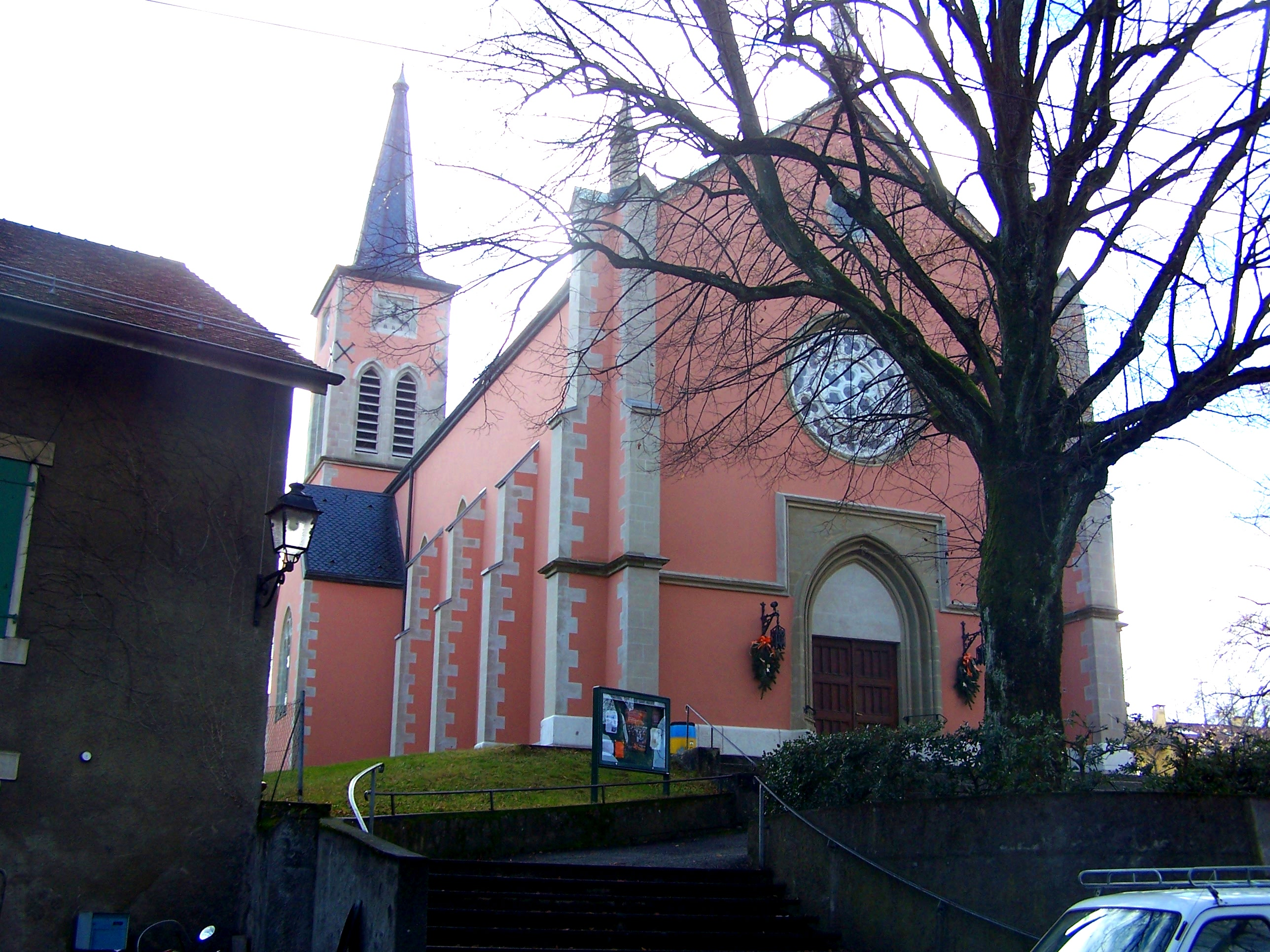
Catholic Church of Bernex

From the 2000 census, 3,679 or 40.5% were Roman Catholic, while 1,934 or 21.3% belonged to the Swiss Reformed Church. Of the rest of the population, there were 70 members of an Orthodox church (or about 0.77% of the population), there were 18 individuals (or about 0.20% of the population) who belonged to the Christian Catholic Church, and there were 189 individuals (or about 2.08% of the population) who belonged to another Christian church. There were 20 individuals (or about 0.22% of the population) who were Jewish, and 80 (or about 0.88% of the population) who were Islamic. There were 37 individuals who were Buddhist, 13 individuals who were Hindu and 12 individuals who belonged to another church. 2,105 (or about 23.19% of the population) belonged to no church, are agnostic or atheist, and 919 individuals (or about 10.13% of the population) did not answer the question.

== Education ==
In Bernex about 3,165 or (34.9%) of the population have completed non-mandatory upper secondary education, and 1,793 or (19.8%) have completed additional higher education (either university or a Fachhochschule). Of the 1,793 who completed tertiary schooling, 45.4% were Swiss men, 34.6% were Swiss women, 11.8% were non-Swiss men and 8.2% were non-Swiss women.

During the 2009-2010 school year there were a total of 2,194 students in the Bernex school system. The education system in the Canton of Geneva allows young children to attend two years of non-obligatory Kindergarten. During that school year, there were 209 children who were in a pre-kindergarten class. The canton's school system provides two years of non-mandatory kindergarten and requires students to attend six years of primary school, with some of the children attending smaller, specialized classes. In Bernex there were 336 students in kindergarten or primary school and 21 students were in the special, smaller classes. The secondary school program consists of three lower, obligatory years of schooling, followed by three to five years of optional, advanced schools. There were 336 lower secondary students who attended school in Bernex. There were 548 upper secondary students from the municipality along with 111 students who were in a professional, non-university track program. An additional 124 students attended a private school.

As of 2000, there were 43 students in Bernex who came from another municipality, while 961 residents attended schools outside the municipality.

== Monuments ==
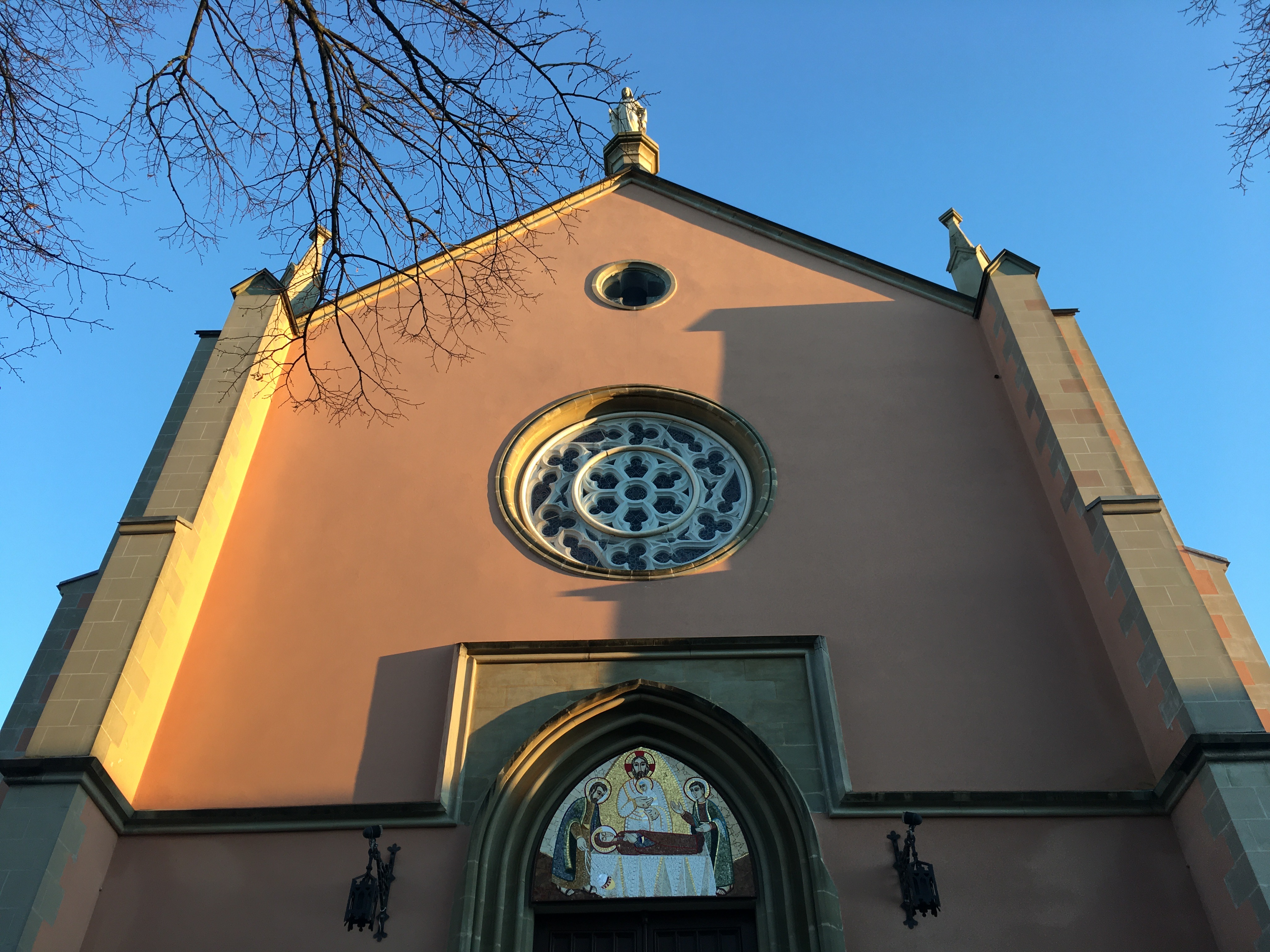
Roman Catholic Church of Bernex

Bernex is home to one of the flagships of religious architecture in the canton of Geneva, the Roman Catholic Church, dedicated to Saint Maurice. Built between 1864 and 1865, by the contractor and architect Jean-François Charrière, it preserves a rich neo-gothic decor and has stained glass windows of exceptional artistic and artisanal beauty, made by the workshops of the abbot F. Pron, a glass painter from Pont-d'Ain. It was restored in 1897 by the architect Johannes Grosset and then in 1922. Its classification as part of the Swiss heritage of Geneva dates from 19 April 1996.

== Environmental policies ==
Since 1988, the municipality has participated in the Geneva recycling programme for the collection of organic waste for composting, a pioneering policy in Switzerland at the time of its launch.

In April 2017, the municipality announced its plan to reduce the use of fuel oil by 96% by 2030.
