= Confignon =

- Municipality
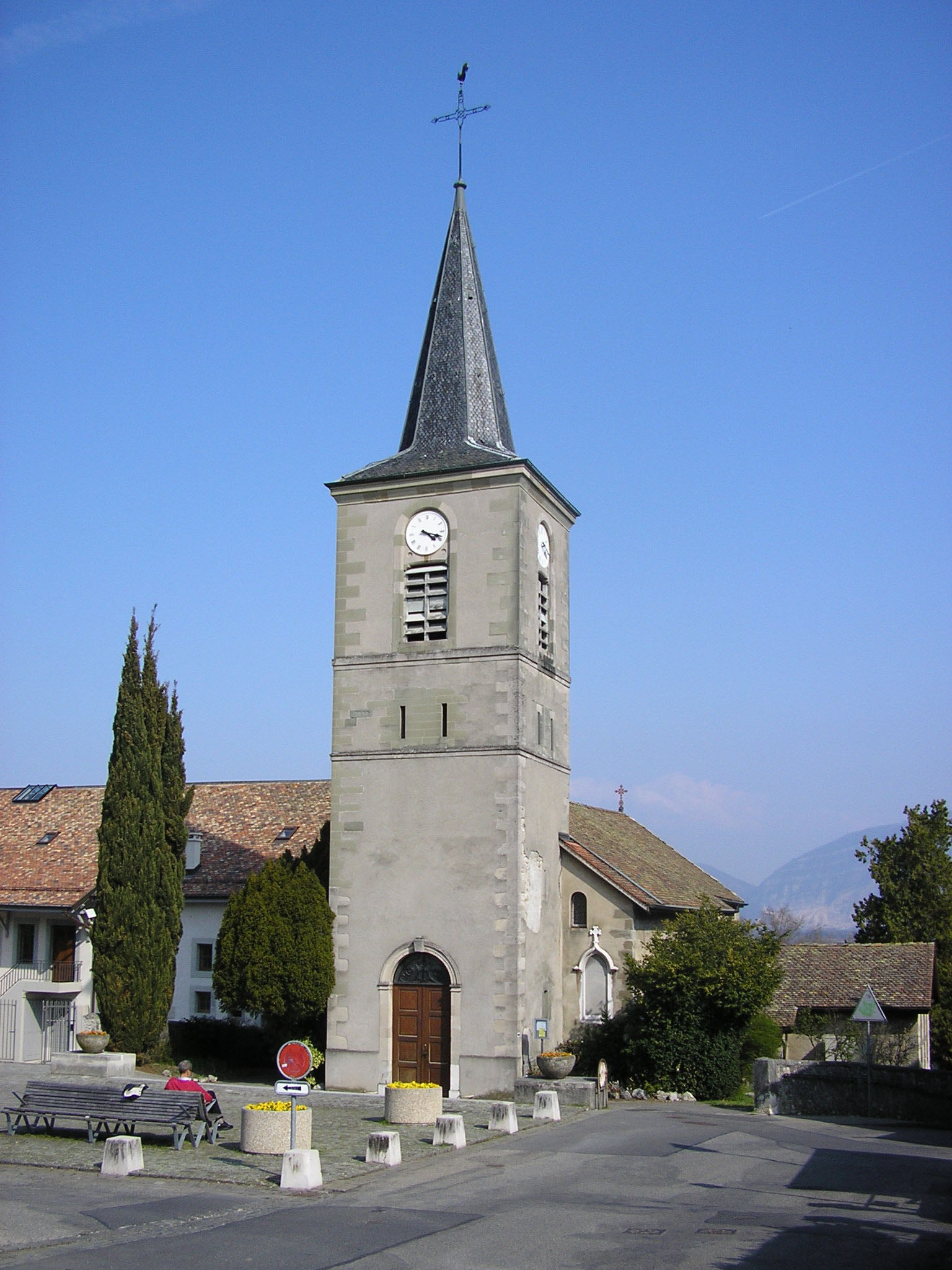

- Flag Coat of arms
- Location of Confignon
- Location within Switzerland Location within Canton of Geneva
- Coordinates: 46°10′N 06°1′E
- Country: Switzerland
- Canton: Geneva
- District: n.a.

Government
  - Mayor: Maire; Nathalie Von Gunten-Dal Busco

Area
  - Total: 2.77 km^{2} (1.07 sq mi)
- Elevation: 435 m (1,427 ft)

Population (December 2020)
  - Total: 4,579
  - Density: 1,650/km^{2} (4,280/sq mi)
- Time zone: UTC+01:00 (CET)
  - Summer (DST): UTC+02:00 (CEST)
- Postal code: 1232
- SFOS number: 6618
- ISO 3166 code: CH-GE
- Surrounded by: Bernex, Onex, Perly-Certoux, Plan-les-Ouates
- Website: www.confignon.ch

Confignon (French pronunciation: [kɔ̃fiɲɔ̃]) is a municipality of the Canton of Geneva, Switzerland.

== History ==
Confignon is first mentioned in 1153 as Cofiniacum. The current, independent municipality was created in 1851 when the former municipality of Onex-Confignon divided into the municipalities of Onex and Confignon.

== Geography ==
Confignon has an area, as of 2009, of 2.77 square kilometers (1.07 sq mi). Of this area, 1.3 km^{2} (0.50 sq mi) or 46.9% is used for agricultural purposes, while 0.23 km^{2} (0.089 sq mi) or 8.3% is forested. Of the rest of the land, 1.19 km^{2} (0.46 sq mi) or 43.0% is settled (buildings or roads), 0.03 km^{2} (7.4 acres) or 1.1% is either rivers or lakes.

Of the built up area, housing and buildings made up 25.6% and transportation infrastructure made up 7.9%. Power and water infrastructure as well as other special developed areas made up 2.2% of the area while parks, green belts and sports fields made up 6.9%. Out of the forested land, 5.4% of the total land area is heavily forested and 2.9% is covered with orchards or small clusters of trees. Of the agricultural land, 28.2% is used for growing crops and 5.8% is pastures, while 13.0% is used for orchards or vine crops. All the water in the municipality is flowing water. The municipality is located along the left side of the Rhone river.

The municipality of Confignon consists of the sub-sections or villages of Le Coteau, Confignon - village, Cressy - Evaux, Cressy - Sur-le-Beau, Narly - Lécherette, Plaine-de-l'Aire - Les Charrotons and Plaine-de-l'Aire - Champs-Blancs.

== Demographics ==
Largest groups of foreign residents 2013
Nationality	Amount	% total (population)
France	145	3.3
Italy	114	2.6
Portugal	113	2.5
Spain	54	1.2
USA	33	0.8
UK	32	0.7
Germany	31	0.7
Belgium	15	0.3
Poland	14	0.3
Czech Republic	14	0.3

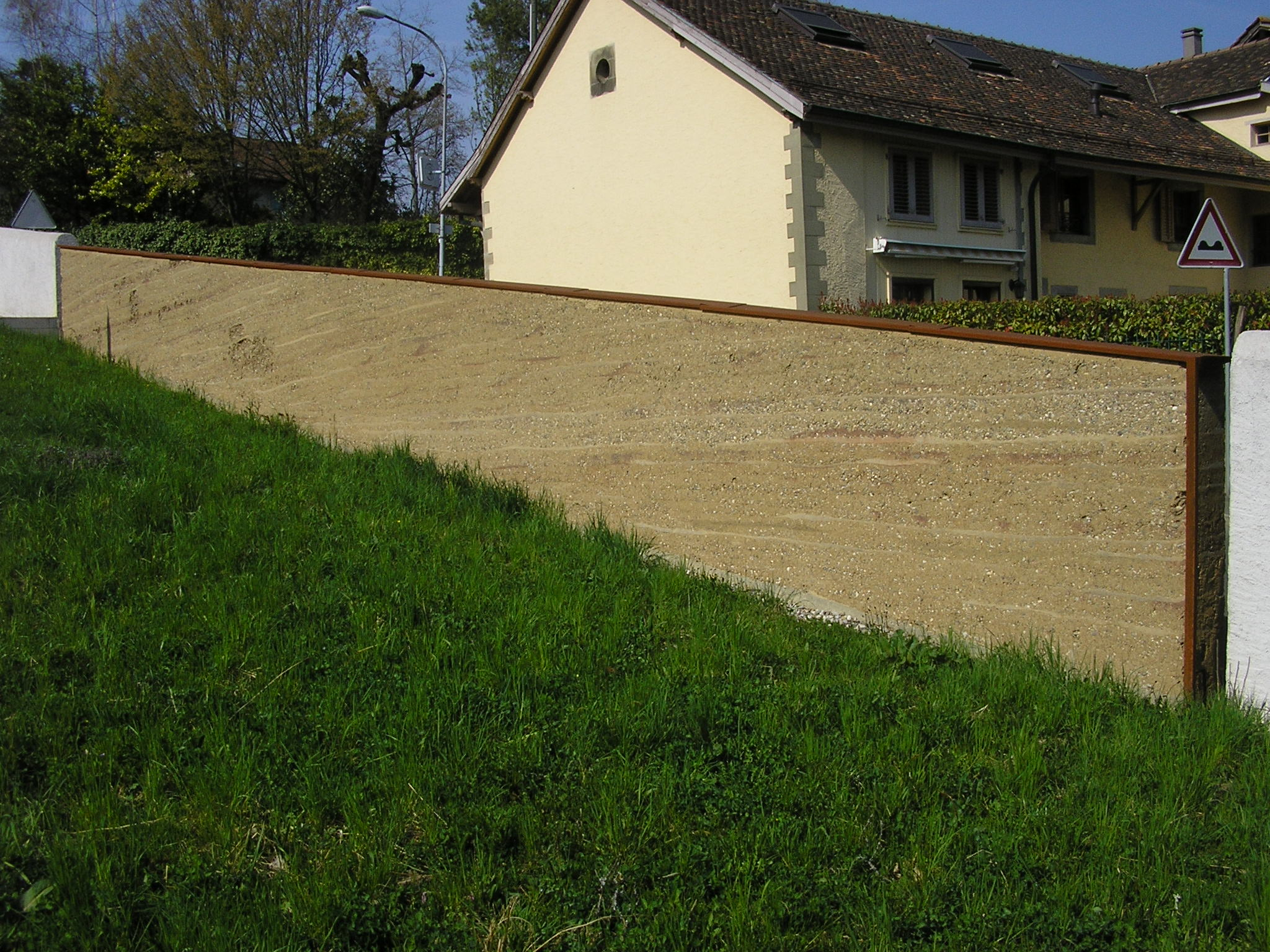
Rammed earth wall in Confignon

Confignon has a population (as of December 2020) of 4,579. As of 2008, 16.9% of the population are resident foreign nationals. Over the last 10 years (1999–2009 ) the population has changed at a rate of 37.8%. It has changed at a rate of 33.5% due to migration and at a rate of 4.5% due to births and deaths.

Most of the population (as of 2000) speaks French (2,650 or 87.4%), with German being second most common (137 or 4.5%) and English being third (79 or 2.6%).

As of 2008, the gender distribution of the population was 49.1% male and 50.9% female. The population was made up of 1,682 Swiss men (39.8% of the population) and 393 (9.3%) non-Swiss men. There were 1,794 Swiss women (42.5%) and 354 (8.4%) non-Swiss women. Of the population in the municipality 491 or about 16.2% were born in Confignon and lived there in 2000. There were 1,148 or 37.9% who were born in the same canton, while 563 or 18.6% were born somewhere else in Switzerland, and 715 or 23.6% were born outside of Switzerland.

In 2008 there were 31 live births to Swiss citizens and 7 births to non-Swiss citizens, and in same time span there were 26 deaths of Swiss citizens and 4 non-Swiss citizen deaths. Ignoring immigration and emigration, the population of Swiss citizens increased by 5 while the foreign population increased by 3. There were 5 Swiss men and 12 Swiss women who emigrated from Switzerland. At the same time, there were 12 non-Swiss men and 18 non-Swiss women who immigrated from another country to Switzerland. The total Swiss population change in 2008 (from all sources, including moves across municipal borders) was an increase of 4 and the non-Swiss population increased by 59 people. This represents a population growth rate of 1.6%.

The age distribution of the population (as of 2000) is children and teenagers (0–19 years old) make up 25.6% of the population, while adults (20–64 years old) make up 61% and seniors (over 64 years old) make up 13.5%.

As of 2000, there were 1,230 people who were single and never married in the municipality. There were 1,497 married individuals, 129 widows or widowers and 177 individuals who are divorced.

As of 2000, there were 1,114 private households in the municipality, and an average of 2.6 persons per household. There were 258 households that consist of only one person and 93 households with five or more people. Out of a total of 1,149 households that answered this question, 22.5% were households made up of just one person and there were 5 adults who lived with their parents. Of the rest of the households, there are 327 married couples without children, 427 married couples with children There were 83 single parents with a child or children. There were 14 households that were made up of unrelated people and 35 households that were made up of some sort of institution or another collective housing.

In 2000 there were 473 single family homes (or 73.7% of the total) out of a total of 642 inhabited buildings. There were 89 multi-family buildings (13.9%), along with 59 multi-purpose buildings that were mostly used for housing (9.2%) and 21 other use buildings (commercial or industrial) that also had some housing (3.3%). Of the single family homes 46 were built before 1919, while 86 were built between 1990 and 2000. The greatest number of single family homes (109) were built between 1961 and 1970.

In 2000 there were 1,162 apartments in the municipality. The most common apartment size was 3 rooms of which there were 306. There were 37 single room apartments and 422 apartments with five or more rooms. Of these apartments, a total of 1,062 apartments (91.4% of the total) were permanently occupied, while 85 apartments (7.3%) were seasonally occupied and 15 apartments (1.3%) were empty. As of 2009, the construction rate of new housing units was 0 new units per 1000 residents. The vacancy rate for the municipality, in 2010, was 0.13%.

The historical population is given in the following chart:

== Politics ==
In the 2007 federal election the most popular party was the SP which received 19.51% of the vote. The next three most popular parties were the Green Party (18.08%), the LPS Party (17.83%) and the SVP (17.19%). In the federal election, a total of 1,300 votes were cast, and the voter turnout was 53.1%.

In the 2009 Grand Conseil election, there were a total of 2,511 registered voters of which 1,212 (48.3%) voted. The most popular party in the municipality for this election was the Libéral with 18.9% of the ballots. In the canton-wide election they received the highest proportion of votes. The second most popular party was the Les Verts (with 16.2%), they were also second in the canton-wide election, while the third most popular party was the MCG (with 13.8%), they were also third in the canton-wide election.

For the 2009 Conseil d'État election, there were a total of 2,513 registered voters of which 1,401 (55.8%) voted.

In 2011, all the municipalities held local elections, and in Confignon there were 19 spots open on the municipal council. There were a total of 2,910 registered voters of which 1,395 (47.9%) voted. Out of the 1,395 votes, there were 5 blank votes, 13 null or unreadable votes and 118 votes with a name that was not on the list.

== Economy ==
As of 2010, Confignon had an unemployment rate of 5%. As of 2008, there were 21 people employed in the primary economic sector and about 5 businesses involved in this sector. 50 people were employed in the secondary sector and there were 15 businesses in this sector. 615 people were employed in the tertiary sector, with 83 businesses in this sector. There were 1,481 residents of the municipality who were employed in some capacity, of which females made up 42.9% of the workforce.

In 2008 the total number of full-time equivalent jobs was 557. The number of jobs in the primary sector was 18, all of which were in agriculture. The number of jobs in the secondary sector was 42 of which 23 or (54.8%) were in manufacturing and 19 (45.2%) were in construction. The number of jobs in the tertiary sector was 497. In the tertiary sector; 53 or 10.7% were in wholesale or retail sales or the repair of motor vehicles, 5 or 1.0% were in the movement and storage of goods, 19 or 3.8% were in a hotel or restaurant, 14 or 2.8% were in the information industry, 16 or 3.2% were the insurance or financial industry, 23 or 4.6% were technical professionals or scientists, 167 or 33.6% were in education and 120 or 24.1% were in health care.

In 2000, there were 424 workers who commuted into the municipality and 1,309 workers who commuted away. The municipality is a net exporter of workers, with about 3.1 workers leaving the municipality for every one entering. About 9.9% of the workforce coming into Confignon are coming from outside Switzerland, while 0.3% of the locals commute out of Switzerland for work. Of the working population, 18.2% used public transportation to get to work, and 63.9% used a private car.

== Religion ==
From the 2000 census, 1,199 or 39.5% were Roman Catholic, while 731 or 24.1% belonged to the Swiss Reformed Church. Of the rest of the population, there were 26 members of an Orthodox church (or about 0.86% of the population), there were 7 individuals (or about 0.23% of the population) who belonged to the Christian Catholic Church, and there were 79 individuals (or about 2.60% of the population) who belonged to another Christian church. There were 15 individuals (or about 0.49% of the population) who were Jewish, and 28 (or about 0.92% of the population) who were Islamic. There were 4 individuals who were Buddhist, 11 individuals who were Hindu and 5 individuals who belonged to another church. 762 (or about 25.12% of the population) belonged to no church, are agnostic or atheist, and 166 individuals (or about 5.47% of the population) did not answer the question.

== Education ==
In Confignon about 979 or (32.3%) of the population have completed non-mandatory upper secondary education, and 796 or (26.2%) have completed additional higher education (either university or a Fachhochschule). Of the 796 who completed tertiary schooling, 47.1% were Swiss men, 35.2% were Swiss women, 10.7% were non-Swiss men and 7.0% were non-Swiss women.

During the 2009-2010 school year there were a total of 1,065 students in the Confignon school system. The education system in the Canton of Geneva allows young children to attend two years of non-obligatory Kindergarten. During that school year, there were 114 children who were in a pre-kindergarten class. The canton's school system provides two years of non-mandatory kindergarten and requires students to attend six years of primary school, with some of the children attending smaller, specialized classes. In Confignon there were 169 students in kindergarten or primary school and 23 students were in the special, smaller classes. The secondary school program consists of three lower, obligatory years of schooling, followed by three to five years of optional, advanced schools. There were 169 lower secondary students who attended school in Confignon. There were 228 upper secondary students from the municipality along with 35 students who were in a professional, non-university track program. An additional 81 students attended a private school.

As of 2000, there were 716 students in Confignon who came from another municipality, while 291 residents attended schools outside the municipality.
