= Bâtiment des Forces motrices =

Building in Geneva

Usine des Forces Motrices
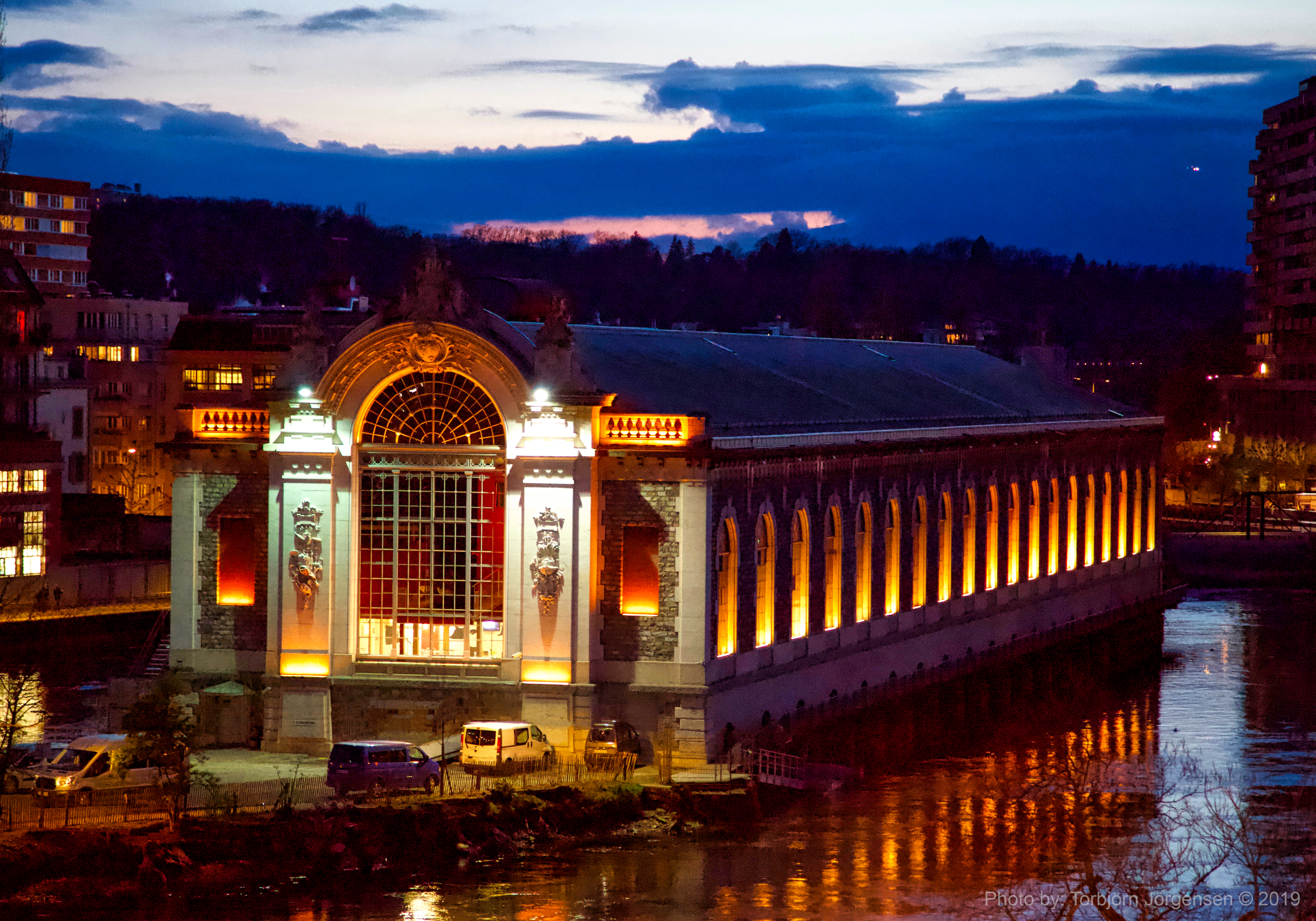
- Bâtiment des Forces motrices in 2019
- Country: Switzerland
- Location: Geneva
- Coordinates: 46°12′17″N 6°8′17.26″E
- Status: Decommissioned
- Construction began: 1883
- Commission date: May 1886
- Decommission date: power generation: 1963, waterworks: 1988
- Owner: City of Geneva
- Operator: Service industriel de Genève

Power generation
- Make and model: Jonval turbines supplied by Escher Wyss & Cie., Zurich
- Units decommissioned: 18
- Nameplate capacity: 3.3 MW (in form of pressurized water)

External links
- Website: www.bfm.ch
- Commons: Related media on Commons

The Bâtiment des Forces motrices (BFM), French for "Power plant building", is the power house of a former hydro power plant and waterworks in Geneva called Usine des Forces Motrices, later Usine des Forces Motrices de la Coulouvrenière.

The structure is positioned near the point where the River Rhône flows out of Lake Geneva towards Lyon. It was created between 1883 and 1892 (and subjected to subsequent improvements) to exploit the flow of the river to provide water pressure to feed the city's water supply and a hydraulic power network. Furthermore, the weir of the structure was designed to regulate the level of the lake. The structure lost its original function as a power source in 1963, but it nevertheless continued to house pumping equipment to service Geneva's drinking water supply till 1988. The weir of the power plant was used some more years till it was taken over by the Barrage du Seujet (Seujet barrage) in 1995, which is located approximately fifty meters downstream from the BFM. Towards the end of the twentieth century the BFM was converted into an entertainment venue, reopening in 1997 as an opera house / concert hall designed by the architect Bernard Picenni in association with the acoustician Peutz and the scenographer dUCKS scéno.

At the time when the project was defined as a "power plant" there was no automatic correlation between a "power plant" and a public electricity supply. The idea in 1882 was to feed power in the form of pressurized water to local manufacturing businesses, who could use it to operate their own powered machinery, which might indeed include generators. Another objective involved using the pumped water to feed the reservoirs of the public drinking water supply. However, in 1887 electricity generation started in a building nearby the BFM, where generators were driven by pressurized water supplied from the BFM. The hydraulic power network needed a pressure valve to avoid the damage from excessive pressure within the network which was located beside the BFM and which was the precursor to Geneva's Jet d'Eau (fountain).

== The project ==
By 1880 it had become clear that the existing hydraulic structure, sited at the city's Pont de la Machine ("Machine Bridge"), was no longer sufficient for Geneva's growing needs, despite a succession of upgrades since the installation of the first structure back in 1709. The cantonal authorities therefore granted to the city a concession for exploitation of the "motor power" (in French "forces motrice") of the Rhône on 30 December 1882. The city committed to construct a new "hydraulic factory" (in French "usine hydraulique") which would provide drinking water to the city and energy in the form of pressurized water for the operation of machinery. At the same time they embarked on the work necessary to regulate the level of Lake Geneva, notably by construction of a curtain weir across the river.

The project as originally envisaged involved building the Bâtiment des Forces motrices on land administered by the then separate municipality of Plainpalais (later subsumed into Geneva) which was in financial difficulties. The Geneva city administration therefore entered into negotiations to move the district frontiers in order to bring the proposed site within the Geneva city boundary. Plainpalais rejected the idea, however. It was therefore decided to reposition the site for the new building to an artificial island positioned in the middle of the river, after it had been agreed in 1882 that the river bed itself was part of Geneva. The river was divided into two parallel channels, called respectively the "Canal d'alimentation" ("Supply [of public drinking and fountain water] channel") on the left side and the "Canal de régulation" ("Regulation [of the water level] channel") on the right side. On the initiative of Jean-Daniel Colladon, the civil engineer Théodore Turrettini now embarked on a parallel career as a local politician, when he was elected to the Geneva city council. He went on to head up the construction project with energy and imagination.

== Construction ==
Before 1882 the level of the lake surface varied with the seasons, rising to it highest level at the end of the winter when the snows melted and the lake was filled by streams and torrents from the surrounding mountains. Work on the structure began in November 1893, when the level of the lake and the flow of water through it was expected to remain relatively low for the next five to six months. Along the part of the river where the powerhouse was built the river was separated into two parallel channels and these were drained successively in order to permit the construction of the building, the hydraulic structures and of a curtain weir attached to the Pont de la Machine ("Machine Bridge") located a few hundred meters upstream.

Five Jonval turbines were installed in the small wing of the powerhouse crossing the river and commissioned in May 1886, producing a combined power of 900 kW. Two of the turbines supplied water pressure to what is today the city's old town, and the other three supplied surrounding districts, some of them as far as ten kilometers (6.2 miles) away. The pressurized water network served, primarily, small businesses including, notably, clock and watchmakers.

In 1892 the larger main turbine hall was ready, with space for a further 15 turbines which were installed progressively over the next few years except the last two. The last of them was installed in 1897, by which time the full complement of 18 turbines was providing 3.3 MW of power.

=== Technical details ===
==== Curtain Weir ====
The curtain weir was attached to the superstructure of the Pont de la Machine bridging the right arm of the river Rhône. The old superstructure was replaced during the construction of the power plant by a new superstructure for pedestrian use made from puddled iron. The chosen building material was strong enough to support the additional lateral forces introduced by the curtain weir into the structure. The curtain weir consisted of 39 single roller blinds made from larch wood. It was able to dam the Rhône to a height of maximal 3.3 meters.

==== Powerhouse ====
The neo-classical powerhouse sat on an L-shaped floor plan, with the main hall aligned along the length of the river and a shorter hall connecting the main hall with the river bank at the western end of the building. The natural stone cladded concrete structure has large round arched glazed windows. The roof was supported by an iron truss structure without roof support pillars or dividing walls inside the building in a way that a vast open unencumbered space for the machinery inside the powerhouse was provided. The interior of the turbine hall was decorated in the flamboyant Beaux-Arts style fashionable at the time. Only the upper facade on the eastern end, facing the lake, reflected the extrovert decorated style of the interior, supplemented at the time by statues representing Neptune, Ceres and Mercury.

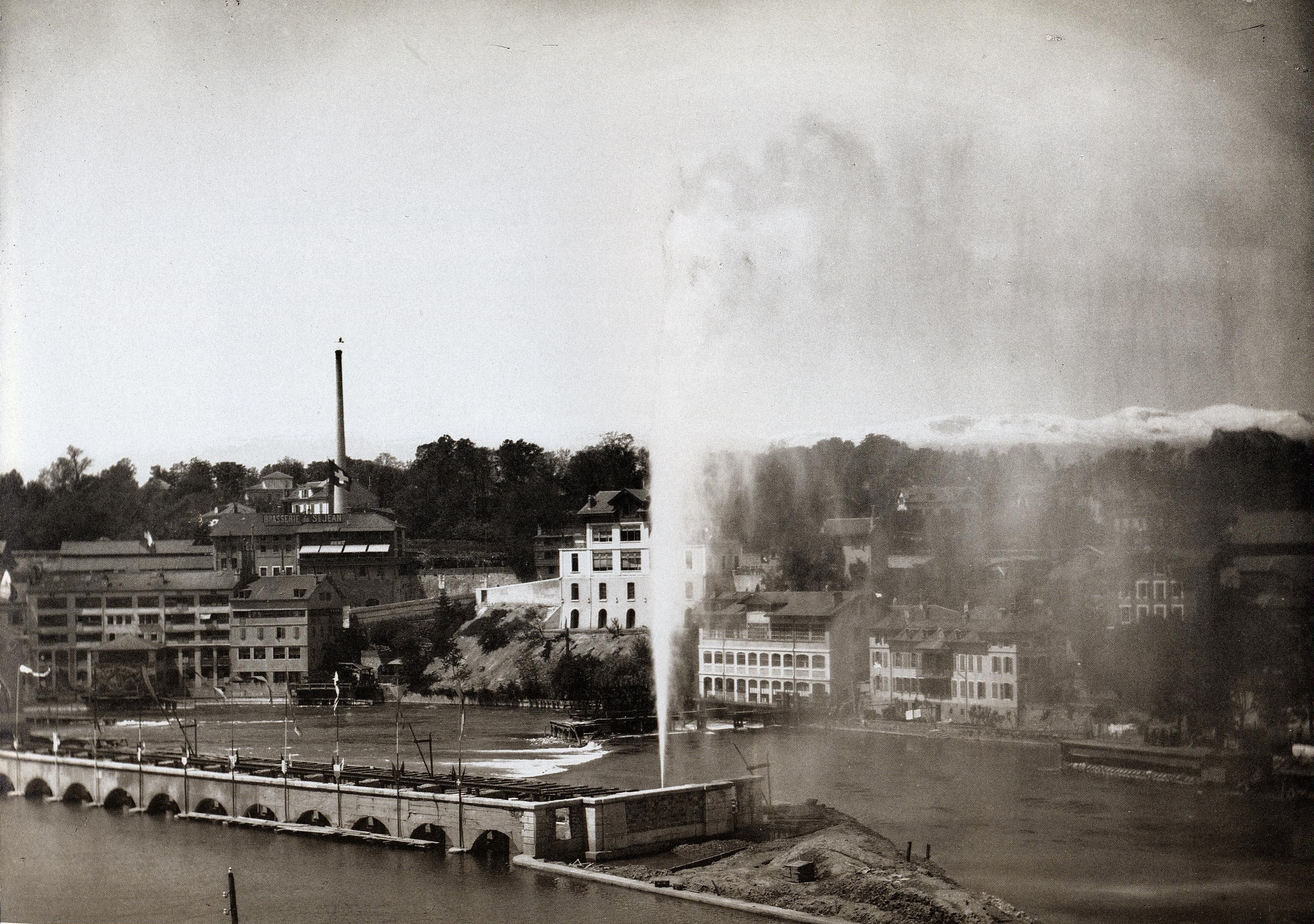
The Jet d’eau in its original location ca. 1886

In order to avoid excessive pressure build-up in the hydraulic power network, a release valve was fitted beside the main hall of the powerhouse. A tall water fountain, the Jet d'Eau, was ejected by the device whenever it was activated. This happened typically at end of work when the factories switched off the machines one at the time, so that the pressure in the system was hard to control and the supply of pressurized water was difficult to adapt to the real demand. The tall fountain was visible from a long distance and became the landmark of the city. In 1891 it was moved to the current location in the lake where it is operated for the sole purpose of a tourist attraction without any other function.

==== Turbines ====
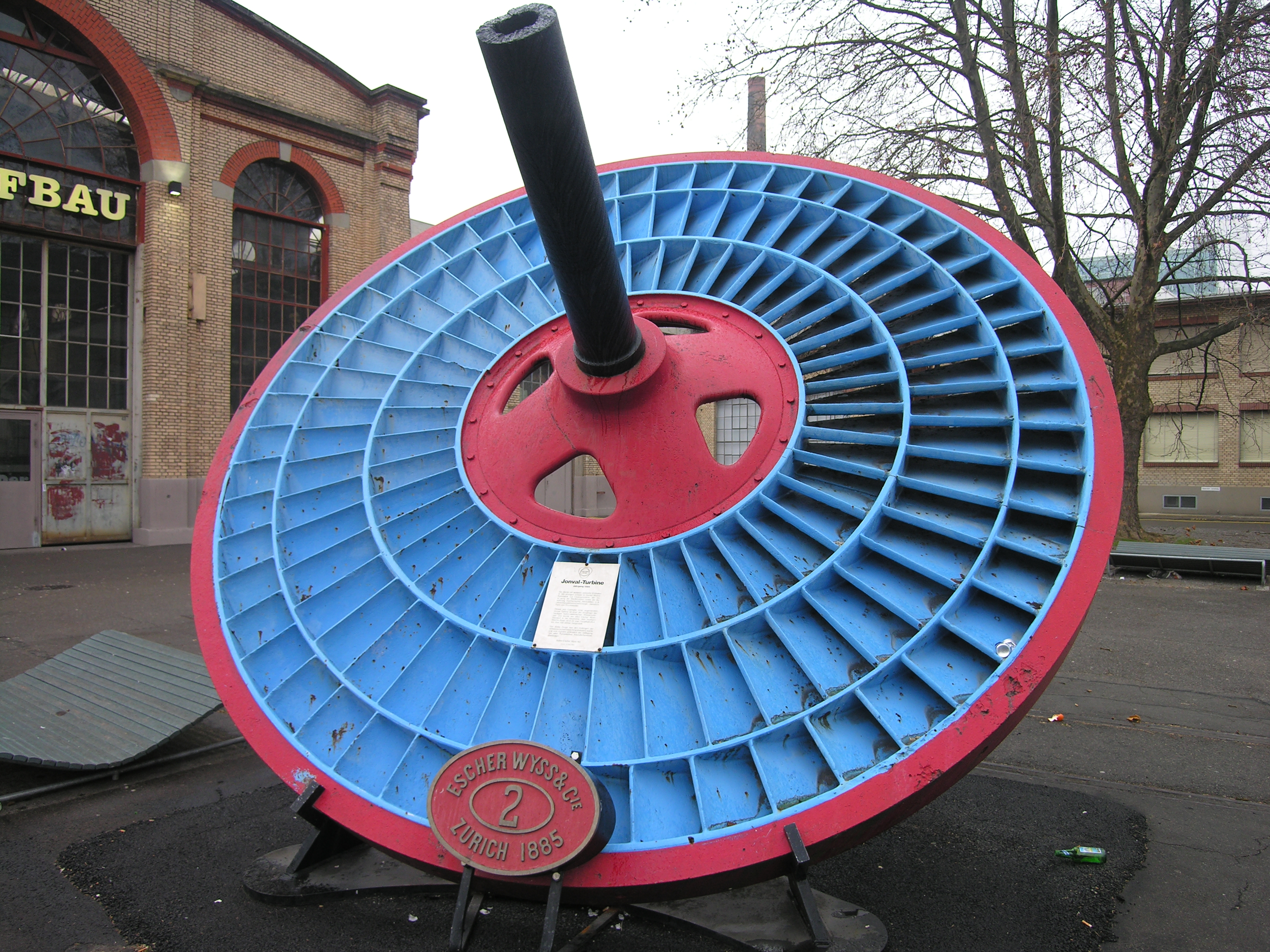
Jonval turbine wheel originating from the Usine des Forces Motrices shown in front of a former Escher Wyss & Cie. factory building in Zurich.

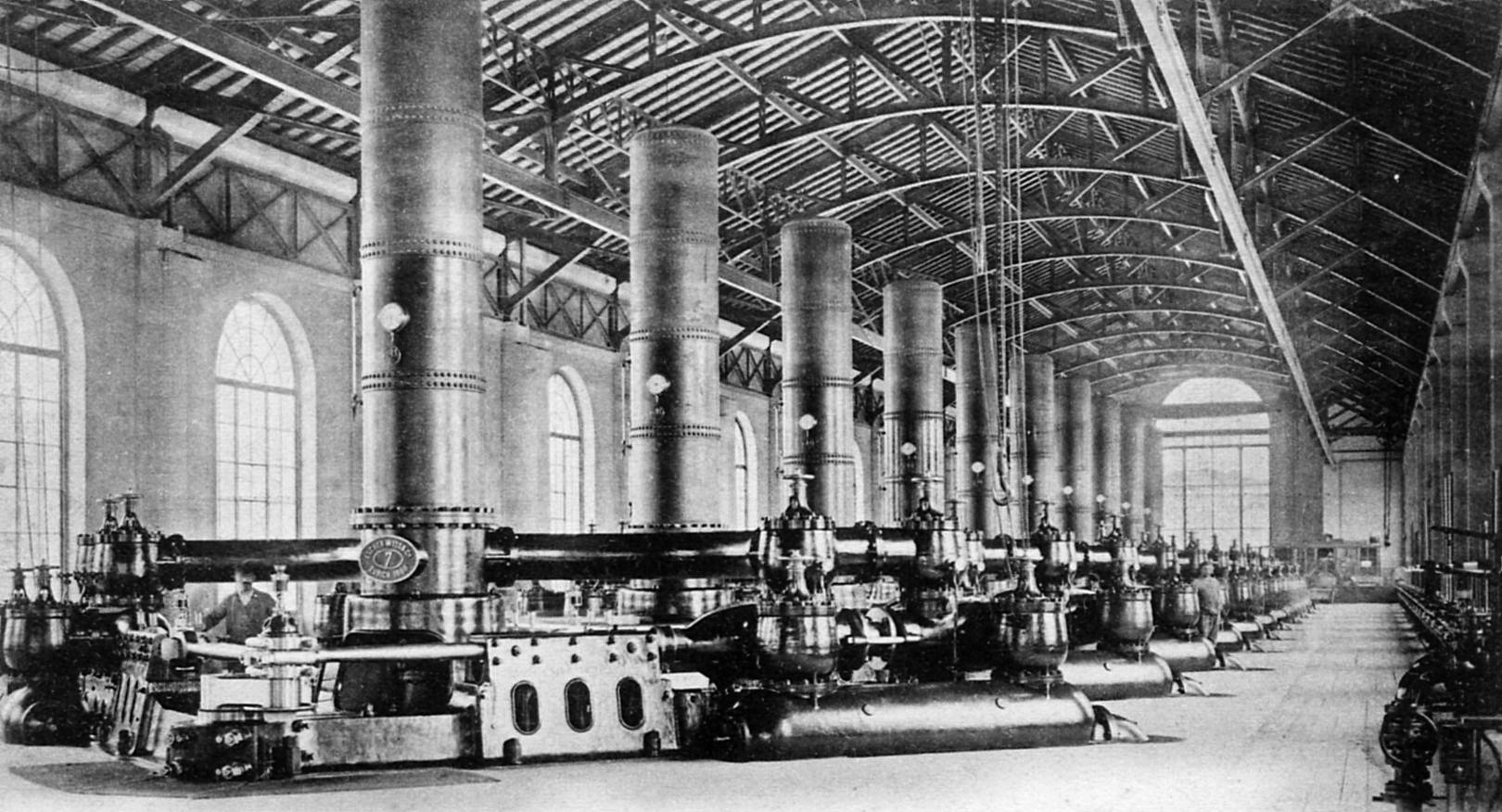
Interior of the powerhouse with the pumps.

Escher Wyss & Cie. of Zurich delivered the Jonval turbines designed for submerged operation. They were capable to process a total runoff of 600–800 m^{3}/s at a drop height of 2 to 4 m. Each had a maximal power of 210 hp. The three concentric arranged blade rings allowed to adjust the power of the turbine to the available drop height and the actual demand. The control was done by partially covering the guide vanes of the turbine.

Each turbine powered two double-acting piston pumps in a lying V-configuration located in the hall of the powerhouse. The two pumps shared a vertical arranged common hydraulic accumulator.

In the 1960s the Jonval turbines were one by one replaced by Kaplan turbines.

==== Distribution network ====
The distribution network used three different pressure levels. The lowest pressure level served for the drinking water supply, the intermediate and the high pressure level served as hydraulic power network. The intermediate pressure level had an operating pressure of 6.5 bar and was reached 1896 a length of 82 km. It was used for powering 130 water engines type Schmid with a gross power of 230 hp. The high pressure network had an operating pressure of 14 bar and reached an extension of 93 km. It was used to power 207 turbines and motors, as well as elevator drives. The gross power was 3000 hp.

Many turbines were used for driving generators for electric lighting. In 1887 an electricity generation plant was built next to the powerhouse, which generated 110 V DC with a maximal power of 800 hp and an AC network with a maximal power of 600 hp. The generators were driven by a water turbine supplied from the hydraulic power network.

The hydraulic power network was not in competition with the electric power supply, but was more considered a supplement to the electric power supply. Only during the economic crisis of the 1930s, the demand of pressurized water as energy supply declined. The last water engine was decommissioned in 1958.

== Conversion ==
The Le Bâtiment des Forces motrices lost its principal original functions during the 1960s, as manufacturing industry moved out to the edge of the city. It was classified as a historic monument in 1988, and then as a cultural asset of national importance. Meanwhile, various avenues were explored to find a new use for the building. After various meetings with the responsible city department, and thanks to the generosity of a locally based benefactor, the decision was taken to adapt the main building as a 1,000-seat auditorium suitable for theatrical uses. The buildings should be able to host productions from the city's Grand Theatre for a year, during that buildings major renovation of 1997/98, following which the Bâtiment des Forces motrices should continue to be available for theatrical events and other entertainment spectacles. Regarding the BFM's original functions, just two small pumps would be left in the side wing.

The conversion was based on plans drawn up by the Geneva-based architect Bernard Picenni The side wing linking to the left (south) bank of the Rhône was converted into a reception area, while the main turbine hall became the main theatre. The theatre, opened in September 1997, was constructed entirely of wood. It provided 801 seats in the main area and a further 144 on the balcony/gallery.

In December 1997 a pedestrian walkway was set up against the northern and western faces of the building, establishing a connection between the Promenade des Lavandières (the unbuilt strip of land to the east of the BFM and between the two channels of the Rhône) and the Place des Volontaires ("le Place des Volontaires" - on the bank of the river at the southern end of the side wing that connects the main turbine hall with the shore). At the Place des Volontaires is a small cultural centre associated with the BFM. Construction of the walkway used the piles and supports originally created for the inspection walkway along the outside of the turbine hall, below the windows on its side.

== See also ==
- Plainpalais
