= Cherbuliez =

Cherbuliez is a French-language family name.

The surname may refer to:

- Antoine-Elisée Cherbuliez (1798–1869), Swiss liberal thinker
- Antoine-Elisée Cherbuliez (musicologist) (1888–1964), Swiss musicologist, organist, and composer
- Victor Cherbuliez (1829–1899), French novelist and author
- Marie Tourte-Cherbuliez (1793–1863), Swiss writer, translator and literary critic
