= Plainpalais =

Locality in Geneva, Switzerland

Coordinates: 46°11′38″N 6°08′29″E

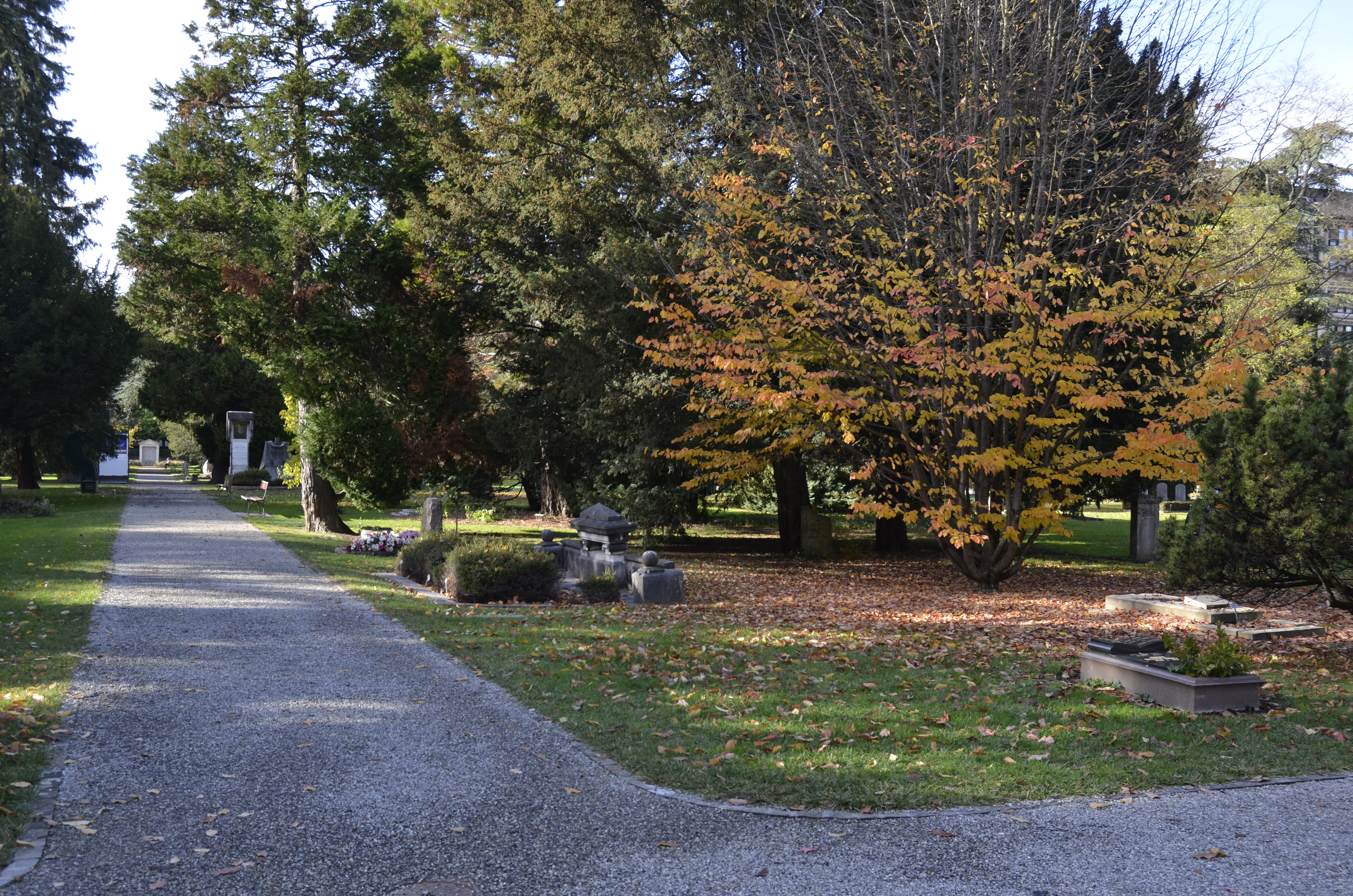
Central avenue of the Cimetière de Plainpalais where some Genevan magistrates are buried, as well as many personalities who incidentally contributed to the renown and influence of the city of Geneva.

Plainpalais is a neighbourhood in Geneva, Switzerland, and was a municipality of the Canton of Geneva until 1931.

== History ==
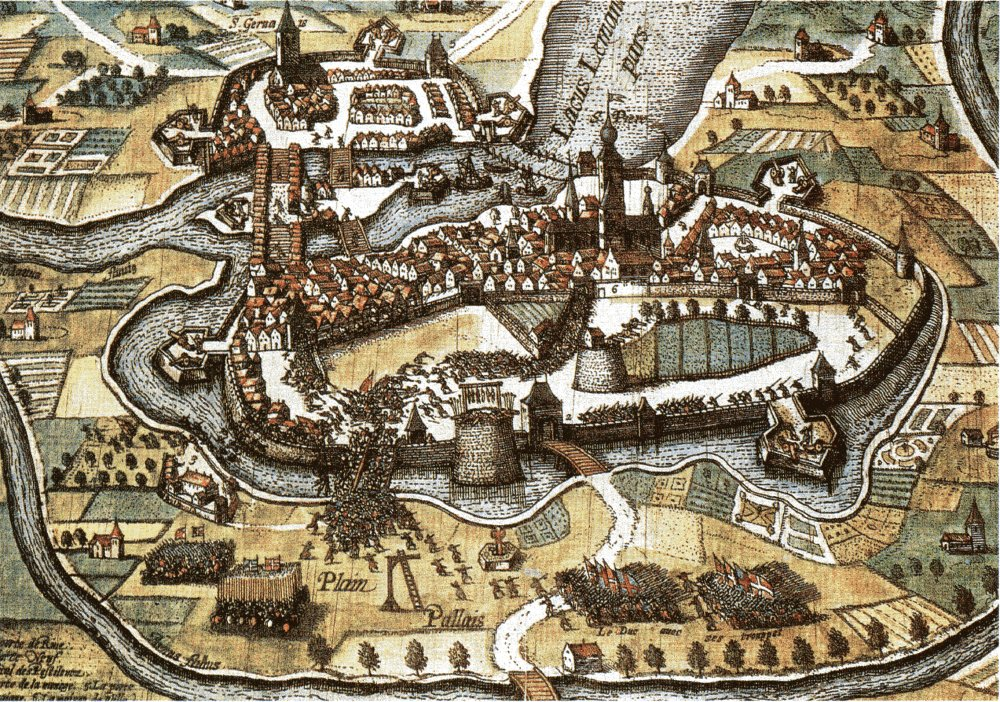
Plainpalais is shown bottom left in this imaginative drawing by Matthias Quad, or the workshop of Franz Hogenberg, around 1603, illustrating the failed surprise attack of 12 December 1602 by the Duke of Savoy to take Geneva. Invaders are pictured crossing the moat in the center left while their reinforcements are entering Plainpalais at the bottom. A column of defenders is in the center, headed toward the Savoyards. Lake Geneva is at center top.

Formed from the suburban areas of Palais (plana palus: marshy plain), Saint-Léger and Saint-Victor, between the Rhône and the Arve, the territory of the former municipality covers the current neighbourhoods of Plainpalais, La Jonction, La Cluse, Les Tranchées, Champel and Le Bout-du-Monde, Les Acacias and a strip of land on the left bank of the Arve (Les Vernets).

The Cimetière des Rois was created in 1482 to house victims of the plague. It was then located outside the city walls, around the Plague Hospital. Following the closure of most parish cemeteries after the Protestant Reformation (1536), the Plainpalais Cemetery remained the only one in use for the city of Geneva. It bears witness to Geneva's history and has become its Pantheon. The tomb of John Calvin stands alongside those of Beatriz Consuelo, Jorge Luis Borges, Sérgio Viera de Mello, Humphry Davy, Jean Piaget, Alberto Ginastera, Denis de Rougemont, Alice Rivaz, Grisélidis Réal, Jeanne de Salzmann, Frank Martin, Émile Jaques-Dalcroze and Genevan political figures such as Léon Nicole, James Fazy or Adrien Lachenal, the first Genevan president of the Swiss Confederation.

It was at Plainpalais that the troops of Charles Emmanuel I massed on the night of December 11–12, 1602, during the night of the Escalade.

The left bank of the Arve was disputed between the States of Savoy and Geneva until the Treaty of Turin (1754), which awarded it to the city. Plainpalais became a municipality by the law of February 17, 1800, the date on which the Municipal Council and the office of mayor were established. The Republic of Geneva, annexed by France from April 26, 1798, until December 31, 1813, was then part of the Léman a departement of the French First Republic then First French Empire.

In the 18th century, Plainpalais was primarily a market gardening suburb (cultivating cabbages, artichokes, lettuces, and cardoons) and a place for relaxation, with tree-lined avenues planted around a large diamond shape (the present-day Plainpalais plain). From 1848 onwards, the site became the property of the municipality and was used for both military and civilian celebrations. The site attracted several cultural and entertainment institutions clustered within a small radius (circus in 1865, diorama in 1880, casino in 1887, theaters, etc.) and was lastingly marked by the National Exhibition of 1896. In 1849, when the question of creating a cantonal hospital arose, the deputies chose the former property of Edouard Claparède because of its proximity to the city and its favorable exposure. The establishment of the cantonal hospital (1856), the maternity hospital (1875), the medical school (1876) and the school of chemistry (1878) diversified the activities of the municipality.

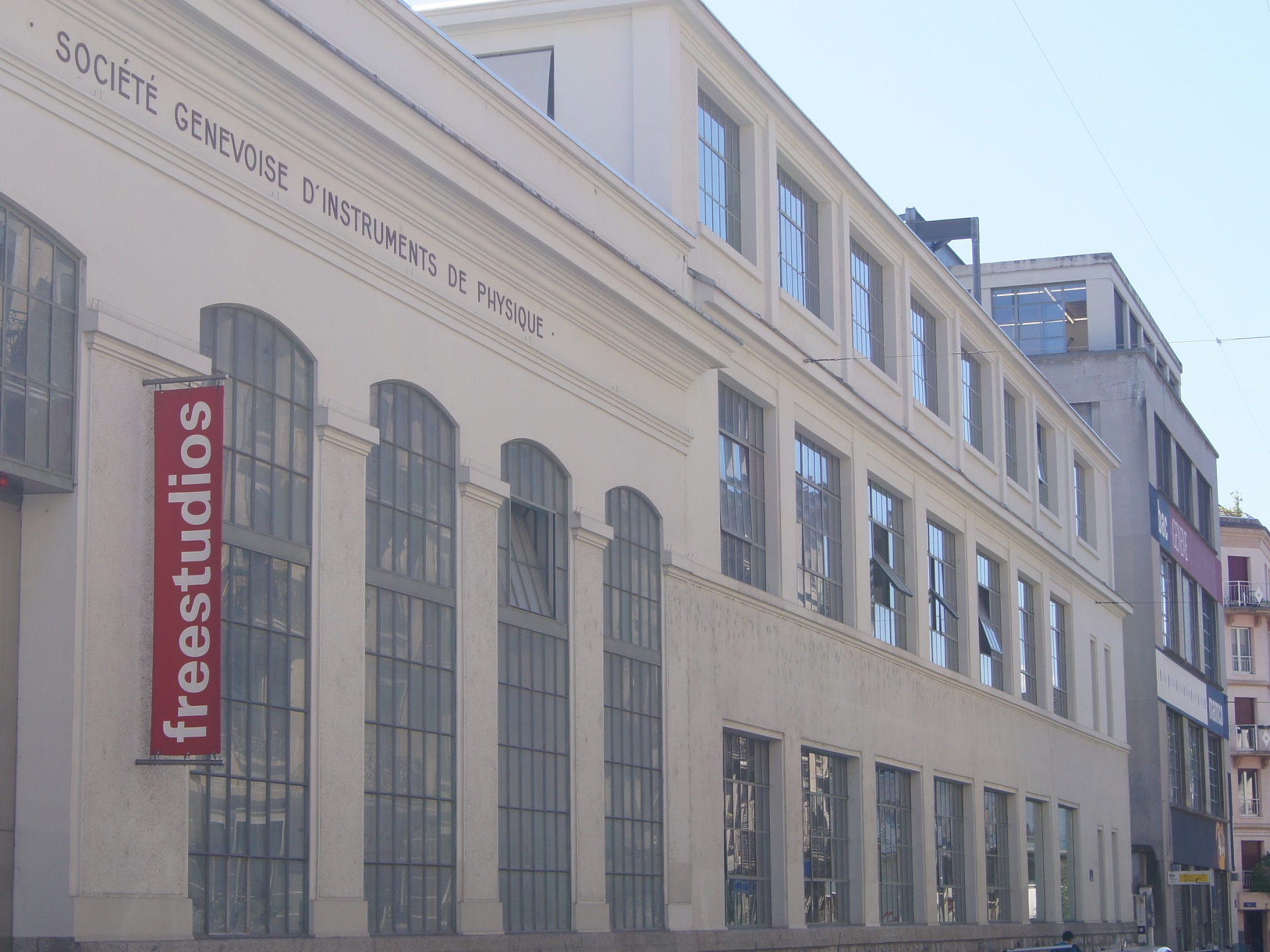
Geneva, rue Gourgas, former buildings of SIP; the MAMCO on the right side

This area developed under the leadership of Charles Page (mayor from 1882 to 1910): the Sous-Terre bridge (1891) and the Coulouvrenière bridge (1896), the quays along the Arve river (1890–1891), the new town hall (1888), and the community centre (1906), unique in Geneva, were built. Located near Coulouvrenière, the gasworks (1845–1914) and the Power Plant (a building constructed between 1883 and 1892) gave the municipality industrial advantages in the mechanical engineering sector (La Jonction district).

In 1858, Auguste Arthur De la Rive proposed to Marc Thury that he dedicate himself to the manufacture of physics instruments and precision devices. Auguste De la Rive provided the initial capital. Founded in 1862, the Société genevoise d'instruments physiques (SIP) manufactured standards and rulers for scientists. These were graduated using a dividing machine invented by Marc Thury. After the 1889 first General Conference on Weights and Measures, when each of the seventeen signatory countries of the Metre Convention received a prototype of the new standard metre, the company specialized in the manufacture of standard rulers or secondary standards, used for everyday measurements in industry. The SIP produced thousands of metal standards from the late 1880s until the early 1970s. The first standard metres were bronze bars in the shape of an "H," with graduations marked on a silver strip, itself set into the bronze within the hollow of the H. Later rulers were made from various iron and nickel alloys more stable than bronze, such as invar and platinite. From 1870 onwards, under the leadership of Théodore Turrettini, the company diversified its activities into new energy sectors (hydromotors, refrigeration systems, electricity meters). This expertise led to the development, in 1921, of a machine tool that would contribute to the rise of mass production in the mechanical industry: the pointing machine, known as the "MP," capable of machining with a precision on the order of a thousandth of a millimeter. A true technological feat, this product propelled the firm to the ranks of the world's most prestigious machine manufacturers. In 1990, the SIP left its Plainpalais site for Satigny. In 2006, Starrag Group took over the activities of SIP. The Bâtiment d'Art Contemporain (BAC), housed in the former factory, is located at the intersection of Rue de Bains, Rue Gourgas, and Rue des Vieux-Genadiers. Currently undergoing renovation, the BAC will bring together three cultural institutions (the MAMCO, the Centre d'Art Contemporain Genève, and the Centre de la photographie Genève) to form the largest contemporary art center in Switzerland.

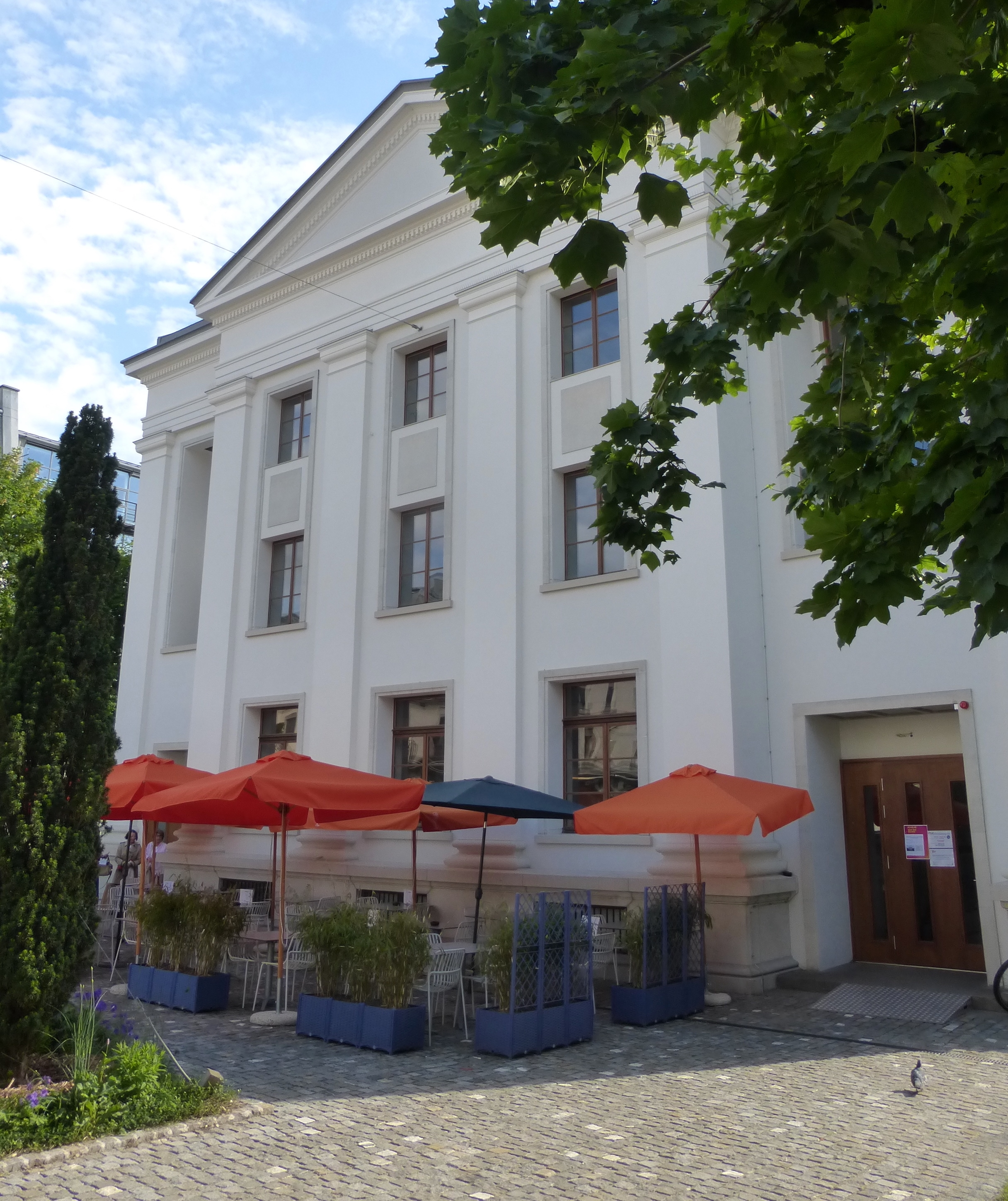
Church of the Sacred Heart in Geneva, after renovation. Exterior: terrace of the restaurant "l'Olivier du Sacré-Cœur".

Located at the corner of Avenue du Mail, Boulevard du Pont d'Arve and Boulevard Carl-Vogt, the Temple of Plainpalais has played a central role in the Geneva community throughout the centuries. Having previously been based on strict religious unity, Geneva has practiced freedom of worship since 1847. Following the annexation of Geneva by the French First Republic, Catholics had already obtained the right to settle there and practice their religion. In 1803, they were granted a place of worship, the Church of Saint-Germain in Geneva. In addition, after the departure of Napoleon's troops, Catholic municipalities were ceded by France in the Pays de Gex in 1815 and by Savoy in 1816 to the former Republic of Geneva, which became a confessionally mixed Swiss canton. After the project was approved by the Geneva Grand Council in 1849, James Fazy became, from 1850 onwards, the driving force behind the demolition of the old city's fortifications and an urban transformation known as the "Fazy belt." This project allowed the city to expand beyond the boundaries of the former walls, which were then destroyed, leading to new urban development and the construction of neighborhoods, including the boulevard that bears his name. Several religious buildings were erected in Geneva at the time, including the Basilica of Our Lady of Geneva, the Holy Trinity Church, Geneva, the Beth Yaakov Synagogue, the Russian Church, Geneva and a Masonic Temple, which would become the Catholic Church of the Sacred Heart. In 1939, the World Council of Churches inaugurated its first headquarters in Champel (41 Chemin des Crêts-de-Champel). In 1937–1938, church leaders representing more than undred churches had agreed to establish a World Council, but its official establishment was deferred with the outbreak of World War II. From its foundation in 1948, the World Council of Churches established its headquarters in Malagnou, Geneva. It moved to Le Grand-Saconnex in 1964.

Following its official recognition in 1852, the Jewish community built a synagogue in the Plainpalais district between 1853 and 1857, replacing the one in Carouge dating from 1787, the Beth Yaakov Synagogue, which was inaugurated in 1859. Banished from Geneva for centuries, Jews have had the right to citizenship since 1857. After the refusal to rename the Promenade Charles-Martin in Malagnou, (Note: Charles Martin (1843-1934) was a Calvinist pastor. He was a member of the International Blue Cross and held an honorary degree from the University of Glasgow. He was president of the Geneva Blue Cross in 1927, when the golden jubilee of the International Blue Cross was celebrated at the Plaine de Plainpalais. He was the father of Frank Martin.) the Place de la Petite-Fusterie was renamed Place Ruth-Fayon. A survivor of deportation to the Auschwitz and Bergen-Belsen extermination camps, Ruth Fayon shared her testimony with children in Geneva schools for over 30 years until her death in 2010.

The Roman Catholic parish of the Sacred Heart of Geneva was established in 1873 following the allocation of the Church of Saint-Germain to the Old Catholic Church as a result of the Kulturkampf. Built in 1859 as a single temple uniting seven Masonic lodges, the building was sold around 1870 to Roman Catholics, who have celebrated their services there since October 19, 1873. Transformed and enlarged in the 1930s by Adolphe Guyonnet, it suffered a major fire on July 19, 2018. Reopening at Easter 2024, the building has become multifunctional, housing the administration of the Roman Catholic Church of Geneva (ECR, formerly located on Rue des Granges), meeting rooms, and a function room. The church houses the French-speaking Sacred Heart parish and the Spanish-speaking Catholic parish, which already existed before the fire.

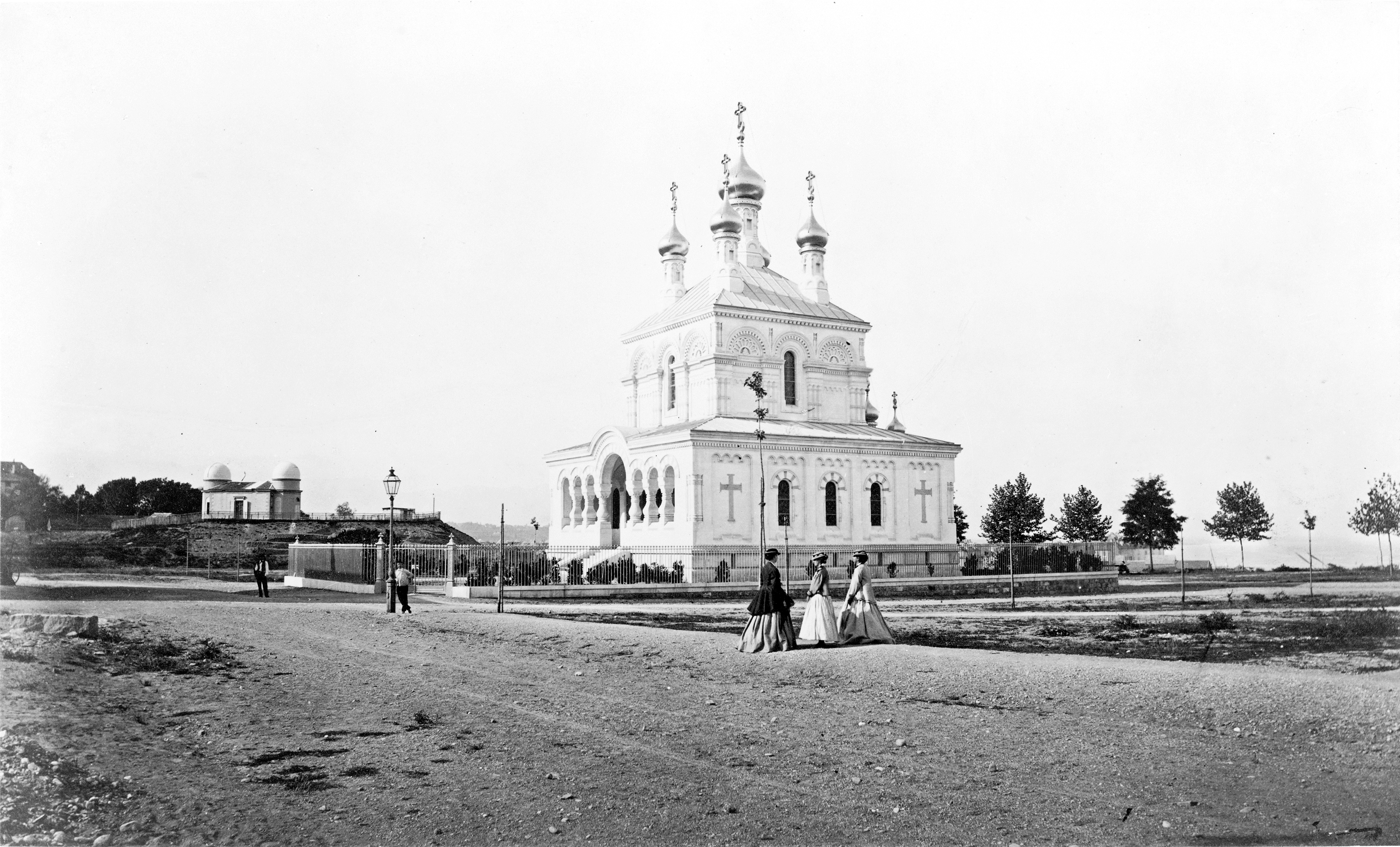
View of the Russian church at the end of the 19th century, with the Geneva observatory in the background.

On the opposite side of the Old Town, the Promenade Saint-Antoine marked the boundary between Geneva and the new neighbourhood of Les Tranchées, then located in the former municipality of Plainpalais. At the end of the promenade lies Place Franz-Liszt, on the site where the Hungarian composer lived from 1835 to 1836, a period during which he taught at the Conservatoire de Musique de Genève at the time of its founding. The first building erected in the Tranchées district was the Russian Church, consecrated in 1866, which was the first Orthodox church built in Switzerland. Sophie, the daughter of Fyodor Dostoevsky, died in Geneva a few weeks after her birth. Sophie's funeral took place at the Russian Church. She is buried in the Cimetière des Rois.

General view of the newly built museum, 1911

The former Geneva Observatory was located on the Saint-Antoine bastion, now the Promenade de l’Observatoire, opposite the main entrance of the Musée d'Art et d'Histoire (1910). Built in 1772 at the initiative of Jacques-André Mallet, the Geneva Observatory was the first in Switzerland. In addition to astronomical observations, the institution carried out meteorological surveys and organized chronometer competitions. The building was demolished in 1829 and rebuilt on the same site the following year by Guillaume Henri Dufour. In 1875, Charles Sanders Peirce conducted experiments there with his reversible pendulum, and commissioned the SIP a vacuum chamber for his pendulum. Significant improvements in gravity measuring instruments must also be attributed to Friedrich Wilhelm Bessel. He devised a gravimeter constructed by Adolf Repsold which was first used in Switzerland by Emile Plantamour, Charles Sanders Peirce and Isaac-Charles Élisée Cellérier (1818–1889), a Genevan mathematician soon independently discovered a mathematical formula to correct systematic errors of this device which had been noticed by Plantamour and Adolphe Hirsch. This work led in 1901 to the Earth ellipsoid proposed by Friedrich Robert Helmert, whose parameter values were remarkably close to reality. Helmert determined a value of 1/298.3 for the flattening of the Earth to be compared with that of 1/298.25 obtained from the analysis of the first satellites measurements. (Note: The legal metre is about 0.2 millimetres shorter than it should be according to its original proposed definition. The official length of the Mètre des Archives was based on the Arc measurement of Delambre and Méchain, but the definitive length of the metre required a value for the non-spherical shape of the Earth, known as the flattening of the Earth. Wrong assuption of flattening of the Earth ellipsoid accounted for 3% of the error in the length of the metre and the length of the meridian arc as measured by Delambre and Méchain contributed for less than 2% of the total error, while 95% of the missing length of the legal metre was due to not taking the effect of vertical deflection into account. Despite the precision of their survey, the definition of the metre was beyond Delambre and Méchain's reach as gravity anomalies had not yet been studied.) The building on the former site was destroyed in 1969 after the inauguration of the Geneva Observatory in Sauverny, Versoix. The role of observatories in assessing the accuracy of mechanical watches was crucial in driving the mechanical watchmaking industry toward ever-higher levels of precision. As a result, high-quality mechanical watch movements today achieve extremely high accuracy. However, no mechanical movement could ultimately match the accuracy of the developing quartz movements. In 1936, thanks to the use of quartz clocks, irregularities in the Earth's rotation speed, caused by the unpredictable movements of air and water masses, were discovered. This implied that astronomical observations were an inaccurate method for determining time. Consequently, observatories ceased certifying chronometers between the late 1960s and early 1970s with the advent of a new definition of the second.

Jean-Jacques Challet-Venel, the first Genevan member of the Federal Council, was the driving force behind the creation of the Universal Postal Union in 1874 in Bern. He had been the director of the Venel boarding school in Champel, which hosted King Peter I of Serbia, Charles Félix Jean-Baptiste Camerata-Passionei di Mazzoleni and Prince Napoléon-Jérôme Bonaparte. Hortense de Beauharnais and the future Emperor Napoléon III visited the school during their 1835 stay in Geneva.

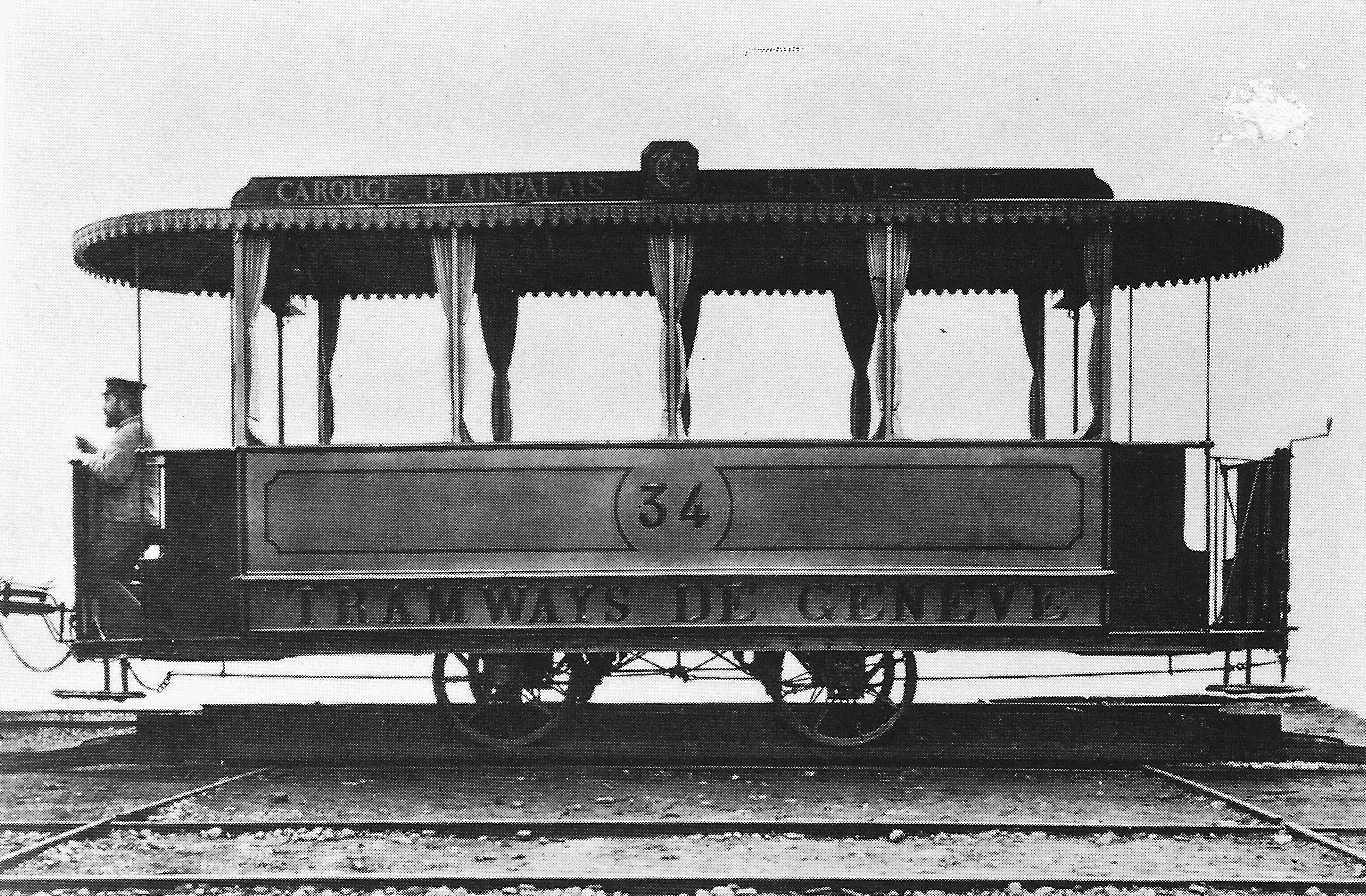
Car number 34 of the Geneva Tramways Company connecting Carouge to Plainpalais.

A horse-drawn tram line was inaugurated on June 19, 1862, between Place Neuve and Rondeau de Carouge. One hundred years later, Geneva's tram line 12 was the last one still operating there. In the 20th century, Geneva's tram network nearly disappeared. Only line 12 survived. It is the oldest tram line in Europe still in operation. Redesigned in 1979–1980, the Plainpalais roundabout is an important intersection in the city of Geneva. The commercial activity of the adjacent district, the presence of university buildings, as well as events on the nearby Plainpalais Plain, make it a constantly lively place and an important station for Geneva's public transport network.

The Boulevard des Philosophes connects the Plainpalais roundabout to the Place Édouard-Claparède named after René-Édouard Claparède, the oncle of Édouard Claparède. The boulevard takes its name from a hamlet that was inhabited by philosophy students from the Academy of Geneva.

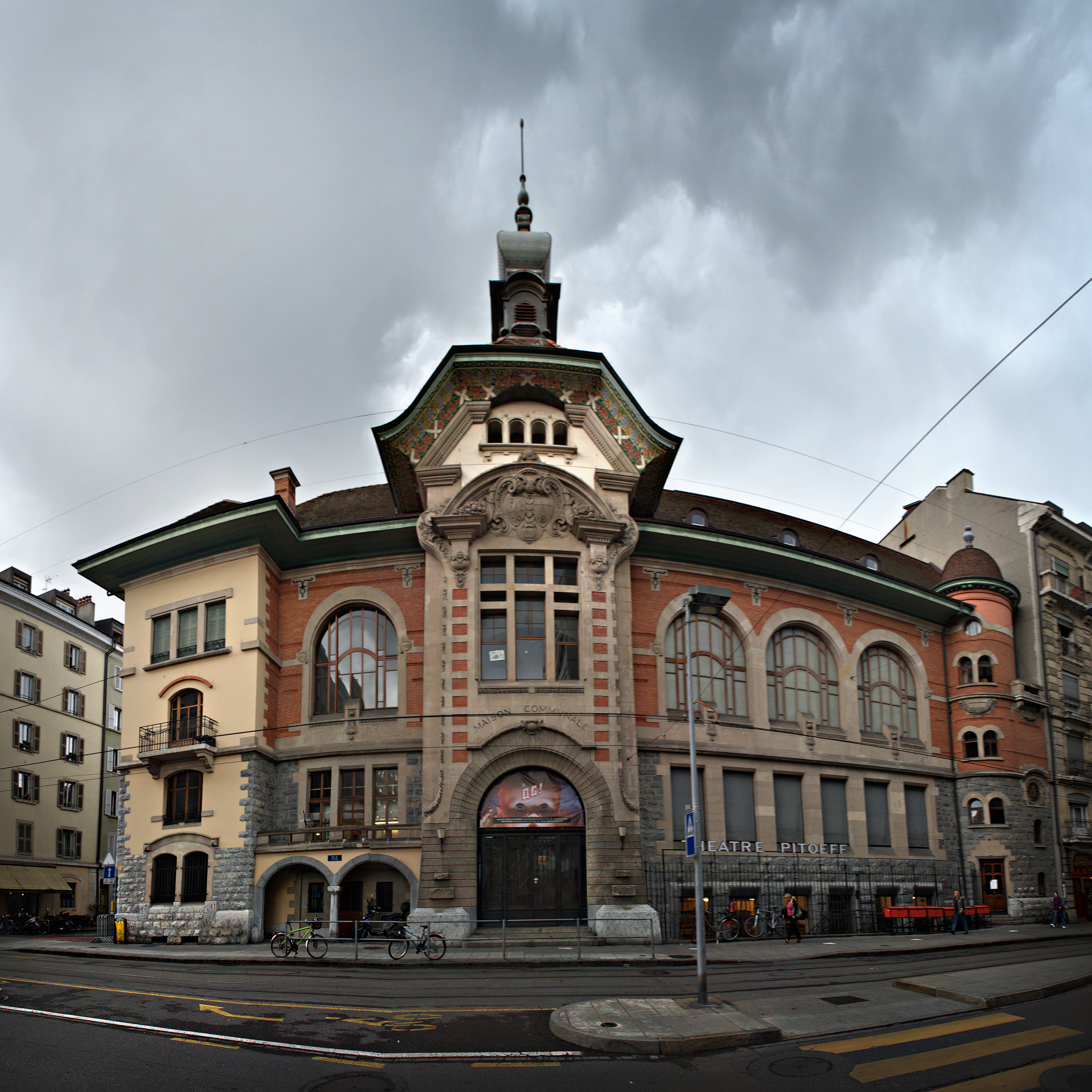
Plainpalais community centre (now the Pitoëff Theatre) rue de Carouge

The Comédie de Genève was inaugurated on January 24, 1913, at number 6 Boulevard des Philosophes. The oldest Geneva institution dedicated to dramatic arts, it began as a theatre company performing in the Plainpalais community centre (now the Salle Pitoëff) rue de Carouge 52. A new theatre was inaugurated on Boulevard des Philosophes, in the territory of the former municipality of Plainpalais, during the term of Jacques Louis Willemin, who was the son-in-law of Carlos Ibáñez e Ibáñez de Ibero, 1st Marquis of Mulhacén.

In 1936, Albert Dupont-Willemin, the son-in-law of Jacques Louis Willemin, created in Geneva with Jeanne Hersch and André Oltramare the Association of Friends of Republican Spain, a pacifist and anti-fascist mutual aid association. Elena Dupont-Willemin, his wife and the Marquis' granddaughter, accompanied Sofía Blasco on her fundraising tour for the Second Spanish Republic. She was an active member of the Geneva and Swiss feminist movement and campaigned for women's suffrage. Eurydice Vernay is the granddaughter of Albert and Elena Dupont-Willemin.

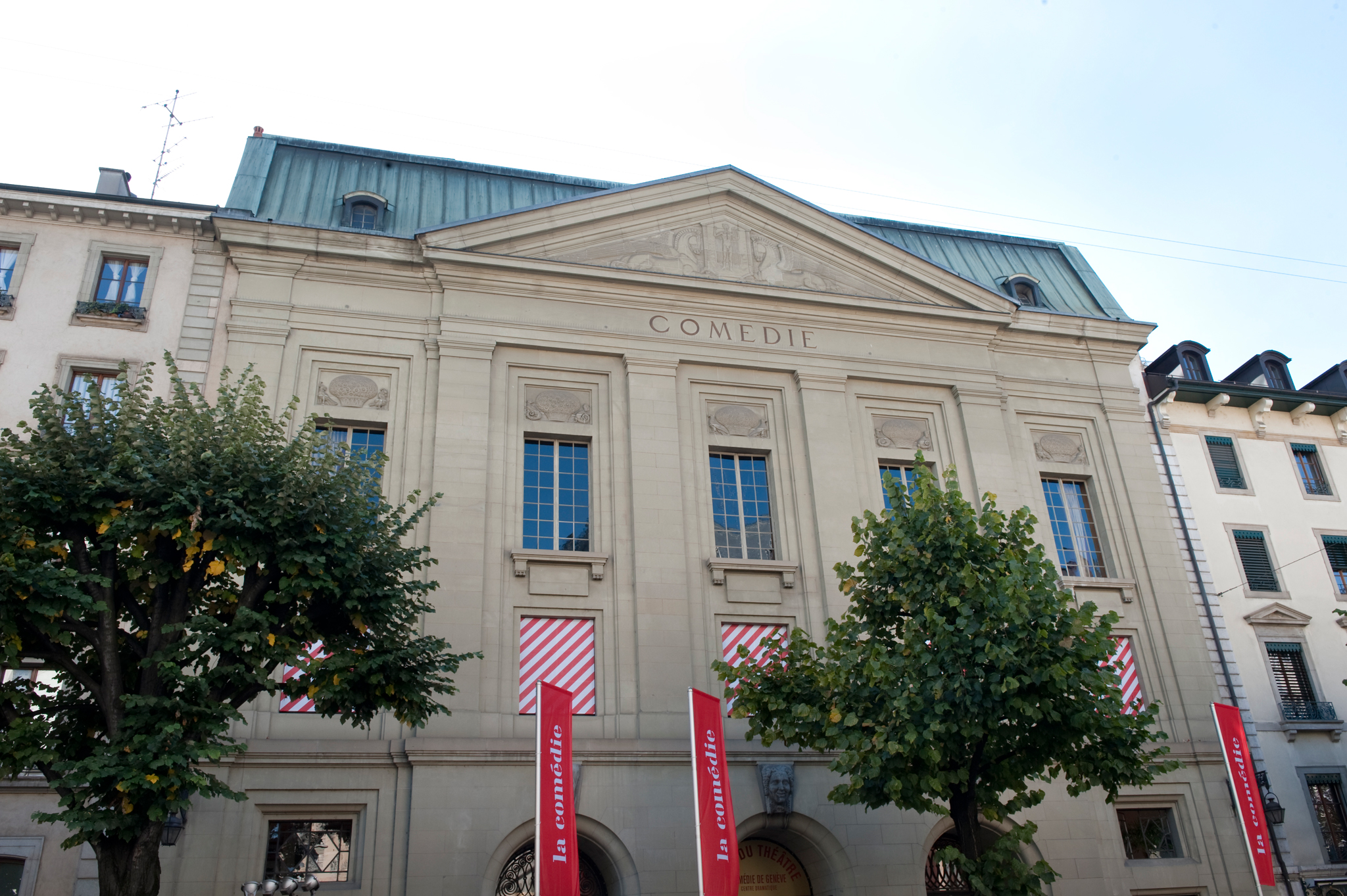
Former site of the Comédie de Genève, Boulevard des Philosophes

In 1979, the theatre experienced a serious financial crisis. The creation of the Dramatic Arts Foundation (FAD) enabled the Comédie de Genève to recover. During the years 1982–1989, with the production of The Green Bird, based on the work of Carlo Gozzi, the Comédie de Genève, directed by Benno Besson, gained a significant audience. The show was revived for several seasons in Europe and Canada. However, the venue had become outdated and its size unsuitable for an institution of European stature. Faced with uncertainty regarding the theatre's future, including the possibility of relocating to the former Power Plant Building (Bâtiment des Forces motrices), the FAD (the Comédie's governing body) entrusted its direction to Anne Bisang, the first woman to hold this position. Since July 1, 2017, Natacha Koutchoumov and Denis Maillefer, co-directors of the Comédie, have been in charge of ensuring the relocation of the institution to the site of the Eaux-Vives station, one of the key stations on the link between the Cornavin station and the Annemasse station. The programming will be taken over from 2024 up to 2027 by Séverine Chavrier from Annemasse.

The former site boulevard des Philosophes will become a Puppet Theatre according to a decision of the city's Administrative Council on June 27, 2024. Once the necessary work will be carried out, the building will house the Théâtre des Marionnettes de Genève (Puppet Theatre of Geneva) and a puppet museum.

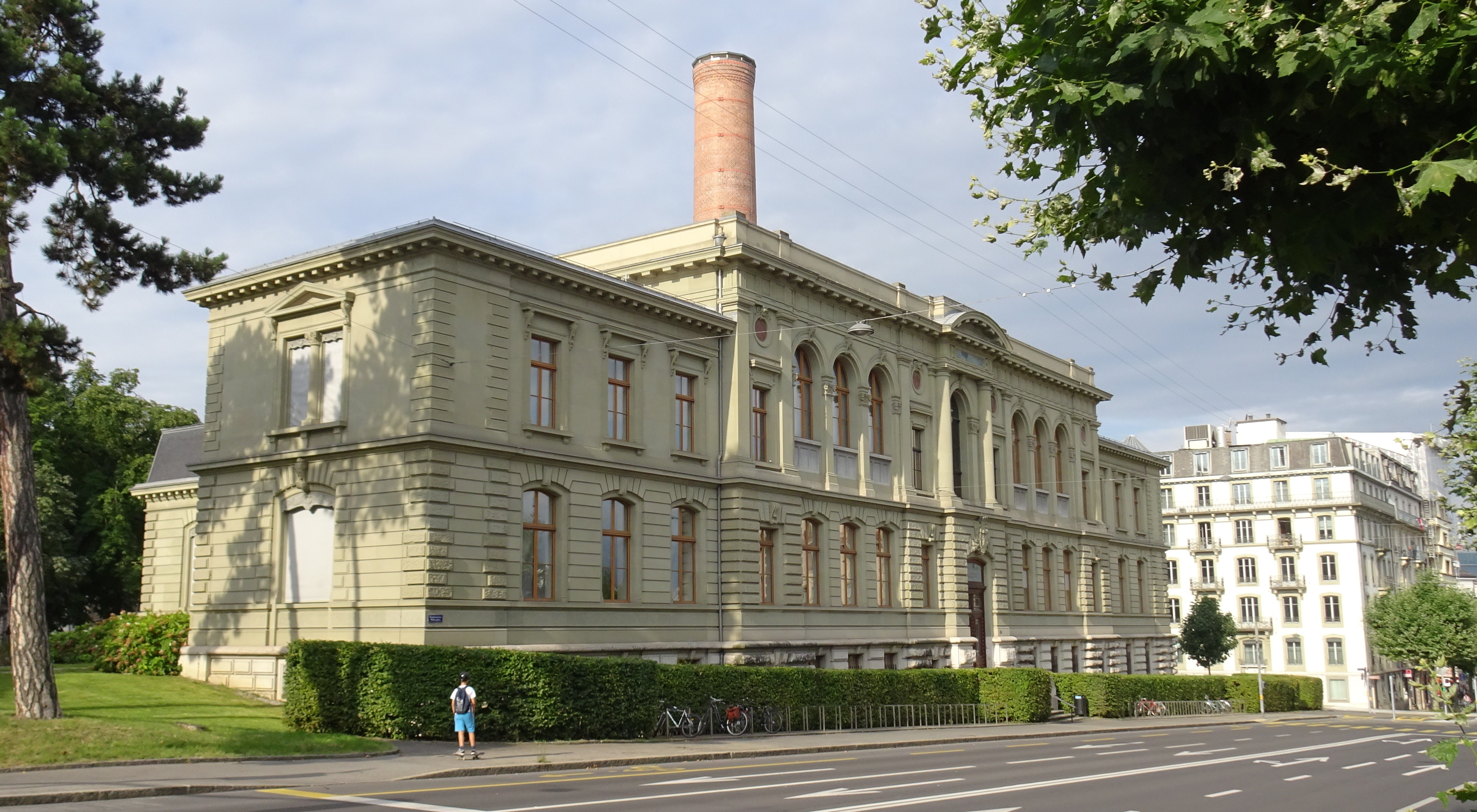
University of Geneva – Les Philosophes

The writer Georges Haldas lived opposite the former Comédie theater at number 7 Boulevard des Philosophes, where a commemorative plaque has been installed. He also gave his name to a garden located in front of Les Philosophes (the Philosophers' building). Located at number 22 Boulevard des Philosophes, the former School of Chemistry, inaugurated in 1879 and restored between 2008 and 2014, houses the Department of Mediterranean, Slavic and Oriental Languages, Literature and Civilizations, the Department of East Asian Studies and part of the University of Geneva Library's collections. The large amphitheater in the Philosophers' building was renamed Jeanne Hersch Auditorium on the centenary of the birth of the philosopher, who devoted herself to the "philosophy of freedom" in the wake of Karl Jaspers.

Jeanne Hersch, who was Hannah Arendt's classmate for a few months in Freiburg im Breisgau, witnessed the implementation of the first anti-Jewish measures in German universities. After fleeing Nazi- Germany in the autumn of 1933, Hannah Arendt worked for a short time at the League of Nations in Geneva. She helped issue entry visas for Jewish settlers and wrote speeches for the Jewish Agency for Palestine.

In August 1936, the World Jewish Congress was founded in Geneva as a political platform to show solidarity with the persecuted Jews in Nazi Germany, to combat anti-Semitism in Europe and the oppression of Jews in the Soviet Union and to promote the political necessity of a Jewish social and migration policy.

Jeanne Hersch, just like Lina Stern, also gave her name to one of the many existing nursery schools in the Plainpalais Jonction district.

Elected to the Federal Council on March 10, 1993, Ruth Dreifuss, after settling in the canton of Geneva, became the first female president of the Confederation in 1999. Her paternal family, of Jewish origin, had been established in Endingen since the 17th century. Her father, Sidney Dreifuss, collaborated with Paul Grüninger in the clandestine sheltering of Jewish refugees from 1938 to 1939. As the events in Gaza triggered a surge in antisemitism in French-speaking Switzerland, Ruth Dreifuss called on the Federal Council to admit wounded Palestinians to Swiss hospitals. Ruth Dreifuss views antisemitism as a persistent phenomenon, comparing its resurgence to a "herpes" that reappears in severe forms. She links the current rise in antisemitism to the Gaza war, while also noting a return of the stereotype of Jews as an evil community. Switzerland launched a national strategy against racism and antisemitism for the years 2026 to 2031.

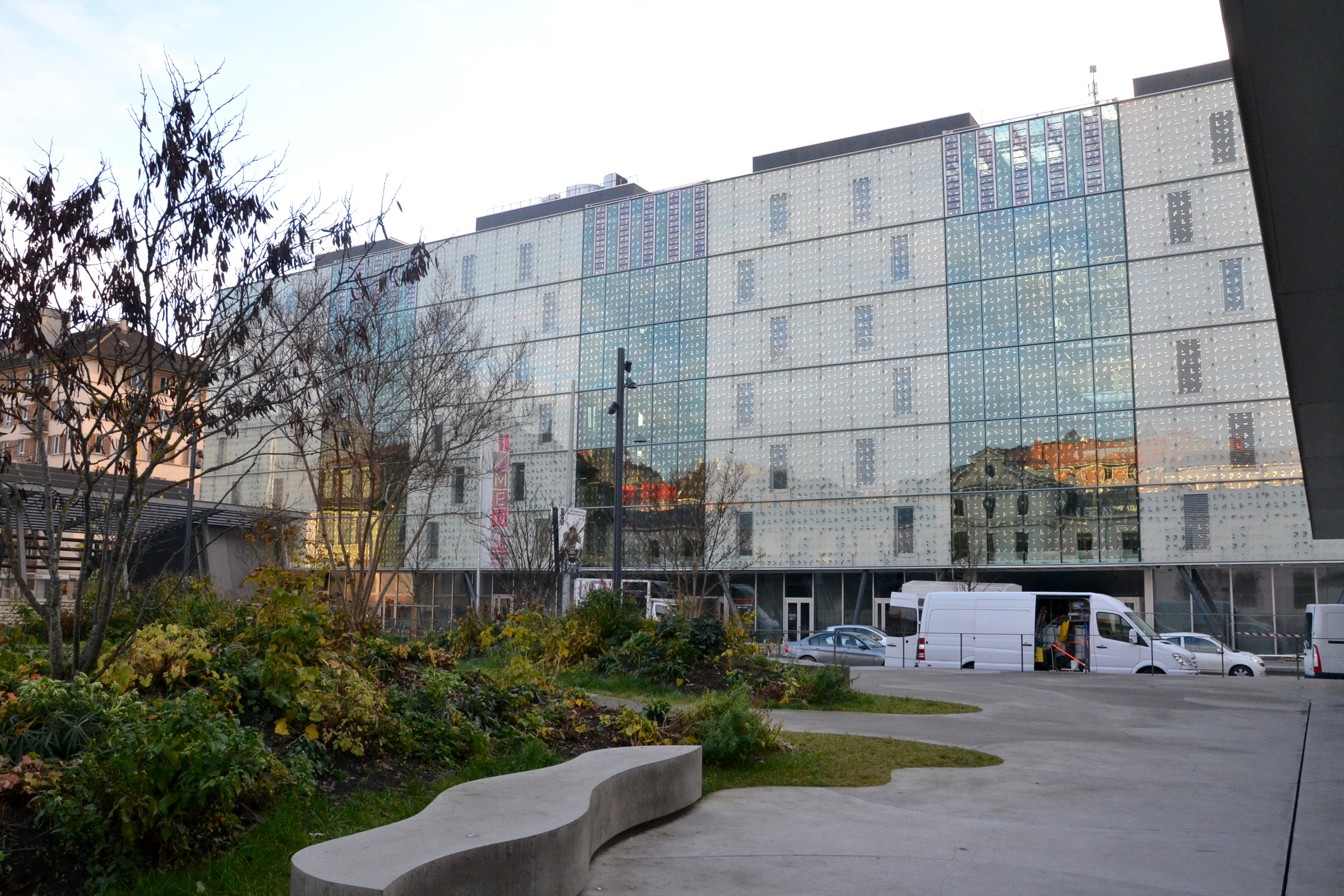
Uni Carl Vogt Building of the University of Geneva

Located at 66 Boulevard Carl-Vogt, the Uni Carl Vogt building will change its name following a decision by the Rectorate of the University of Geneva. The decision is motivated by the racist and misogynistic theories of the German born naturalist. Germany's influence in Romandy during the 19th century was marked by scientific figures now criticized, such as Carl Vogt, first Rector of the University of Geneva, who was an assistant of Louis Agassiz at the Neuchâtel Academy. Although Carl Vogt supported the hierarchy of races, he is also credited with the law that allowed women to enter university. Born in Le Petit-Saconnex, then another municipality of Canton of Geneva, Marguerite Champendal was the first Genevan woman to obtain a doctorate in medicine at the University of Geneva in 1900. The sociological concept of intersectionality describes how belonging to multiple groups experiencing discrimination contributes to a unique experience for those affected, an experience that is, for example, the result of the interplay of racism and sexism. The case of Alice Mathieu-Dubois, the first black doctor in France, illustrated the intersectionality between misogyny and racism. Long dominated by men, the medical profession has become increasingly feminized since the last quarter of the 20th century, and nearly two-thirds of doctors will be women by 2050. In 2020, a controversy arose in France regarding the existence of racialized medicine. However, the lack of ethnic statistics in France, as in Switzerland, made it difficult to identify racial discrimination. At the end of 2025, Dr. Mohammed Abbas founded in Geneva Onesimus, the Swiss Network of Afro-descendant Doctors, which offers a space for mentoring and mutual support as a community of solidarity and excellence, rather than focusing on reporting blameworthy behaviour. In 2026, the HUG (Geneva University Hospitals) strengthened their system for combating racism and discrimination. This is an especially important issue given that in Switzerland three-quarters of new doctors obtained their degree abroad.

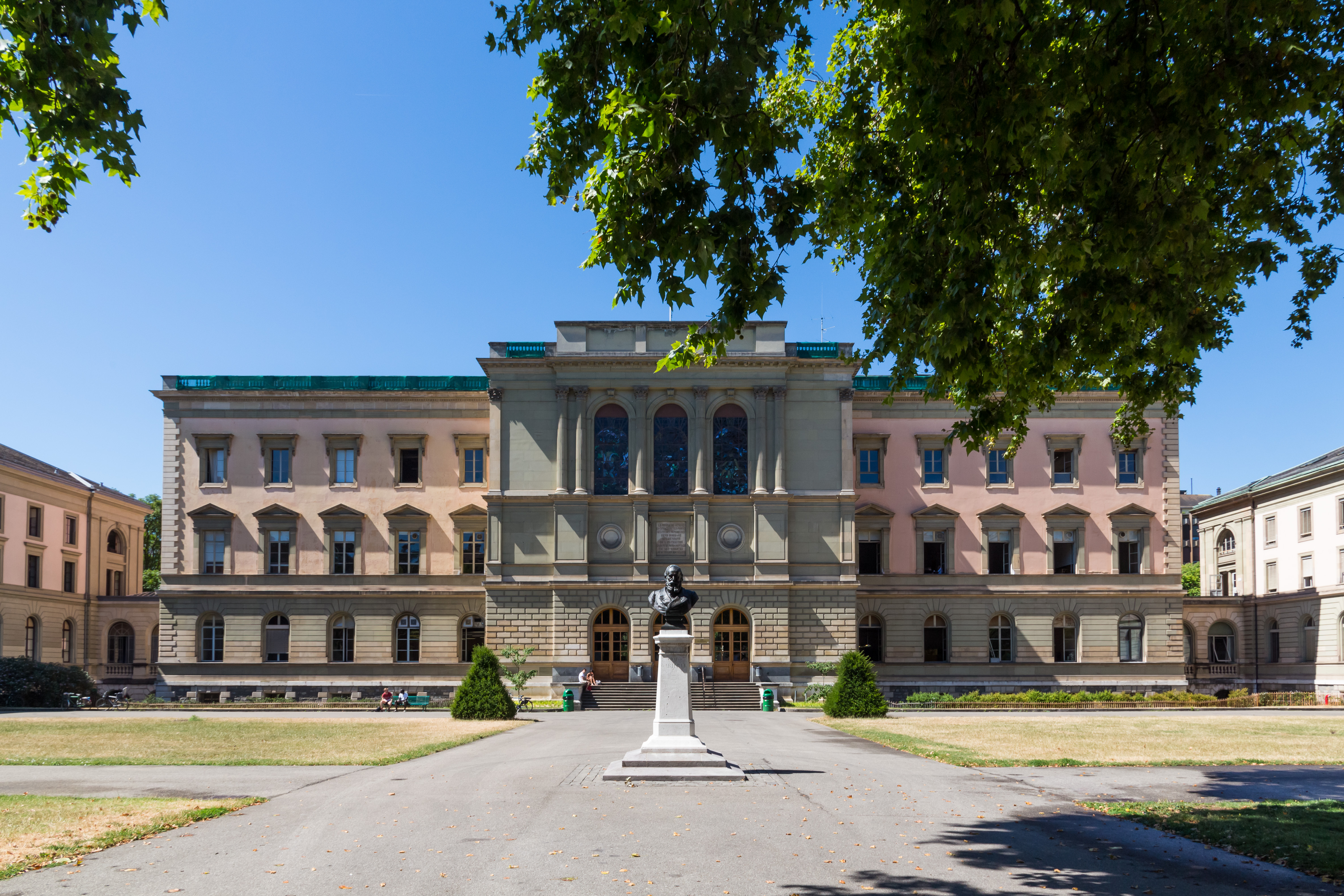
University of Geneva (Uni Bastions)

In 1559, the Academy of Geneva was created at the initiative of John Calvin as a theological and humanist seminary. Theodore Beza was its first rector. In 1864, Carl Vogt presented a university project which was realized in 1873 with the creation of the faculty of medicine and the construction of the three university buildings of the Bastions between 1868 and 1872. The first botanical garden of the Conservatory and Botanical Garden of the city of Geneva (Conservatoire et Jardin botaniques de la Ville de Genève) was inaugurated on November 19, 1817, in what is now the Parc des Bastions, at the initiative of Augustin Pyrame de Candolle, who would serve as its director until his death in 1841. In 1816, he accepted the chair of professor of natural history in Geneva, stipulating as a condition the creation of a botanical garden to support his university teaching. The garden was established thanks to a public subscription that garnered 284 donations. The Botanical Gardens were transferred to the Console site (192 rue de Lausanne) in 1904. In its present location, it occupies an area of 28 hectares (69 acres) adjacent to Lake Geneva and the park of the United Nations Office at Geneva and ranks as one of the five most important in the world. The greenhouses at Bastions were removed to make way for the Wall of the Reformers.

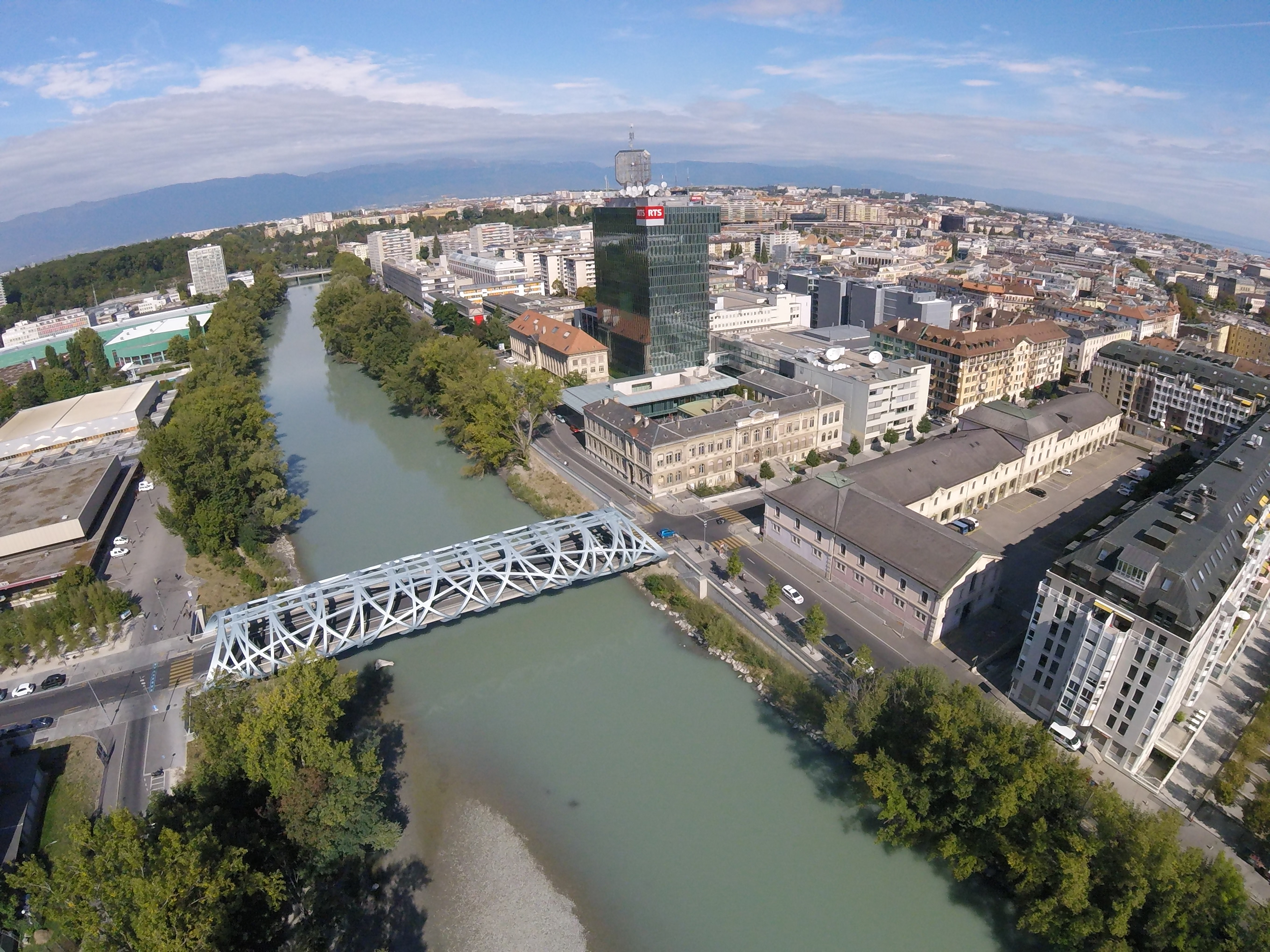
The Hans Wilsdorf Bridge, the former medical school and Radio Télévision Suisse tower in the Plainpalais district of Geneva.

The former medical school was built in 1876 at the corner of the Rue de l'Ecole-de-médecine, to which it gave its name, and the Quai Ernest-Ansermet, where the Radio Télévision Suisse tower, built in 1968–1970, is also located in its immediate vicinity. The Hans Wilsdorf bridge connects the Rue de l’Ecole-de-Médecine to Les Vernets where Rolex headquarters are located.

From 1875 to 1876, a building was constructed in Plainpalais to house a barracks, an arsenal, and a riding school with stables. The building was subsequently replaced by the former exhibition hall, then by Uni Mail. The presence of the Exhibition Palace in Plainpalais, between 1926 and 1980, reinforced the dynamism of the district. Upon its demolition, the site was occupied by one of the main buildings of the University of Geneva.

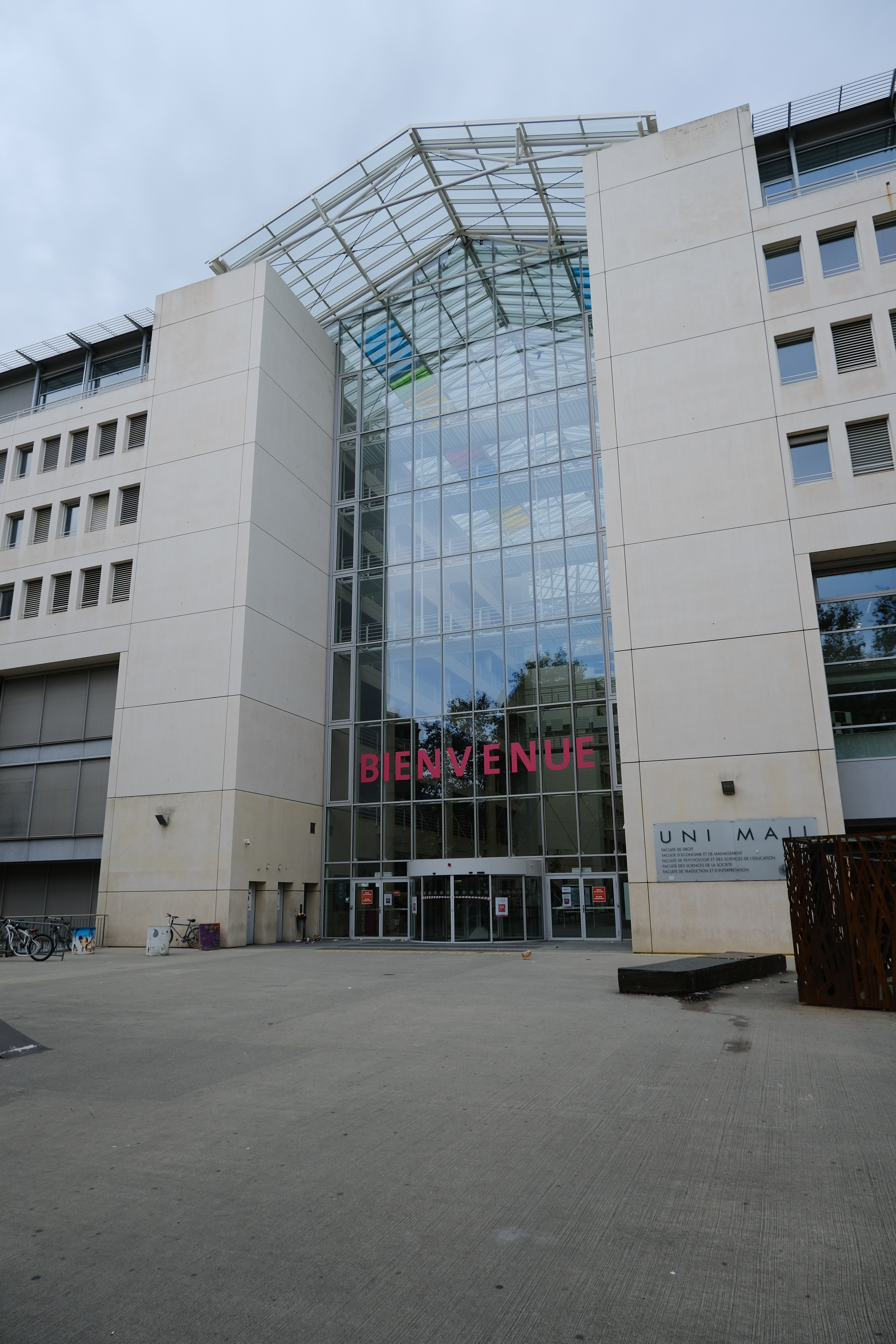
Uni Mail entrance at the site of the former Exhibition Hall, from where the Swiss Army opened fire on the crowd.

In 1932, the Social Democratic Party's section of Geneva protested against the National Union's plan to hold a political meeting aimed at disqualifying socialist leaders Léon Nicole and Jacques Dicker at the Plainpalais community centre. The Geneva Socialist Party called for an anti-fascist demonstration. Fearing a riot, the Council of State of Geneva requested the support of the Swiss Confederation. On November 9, 1932, at 9:34 p.m., three sections of a conscripts' company, called in to reinforce the Geneva police, feeling cornered in front of the former Exhibition Hall (Uni Mail), opened fire on the crowd, killing 13 and wounding 65. The November 1932 Geneva shooting, resonated worldwide due to the presence of the League of Nations.

The international context was threatening with the rise of fascism in Europe. In 1922, Benito Mussolini seized power in Italy, followed by Engelbert Dollfuss in Austria in 1932. Meanwhile, the elections of July 31, 1932, foreshadowed Adolf Hitler's rise to power in Germany in 1933. The National Union of Geneva, whose sole leader was Georges Oltramare from 1935 onwards, was the Swiss movement that came closest to the Italian fascist model. A prominent figure in the Italian Socialist Party at its Zurich conference in 1913, Benito Mussolini was expelled from the party in November 1914 due to his opposition to Italian neutrality. At the end of World War I, he founded the fascist movement. Under fascist regime, Mussolini persecuted his former socialist comrades, some of whom chose exile in Switzerland. Despite official declarations of friendship, Mussolini sometimes expressed contemptuous judgments against Swiss institutions and democracy.

On the left, the Geneva Socialist Party was dominated by Nicole's personality and rhetoric, and Dicker's political views, which favored united action with the Communists. The Geneva massacre of 9 November 1932 exposed the contradictions within the socialist movement and foreshadowed the split of both the Genevan Socialist Party and the Swiss Socialist Party. Relations between the Social Democratic Party of Switzerland and the Genevan Socialist Party had deteriorated since 1929. In 1935, by joining the national defense effort, the Social Democratic Party of Switzerland broke with a long antimilitarist and pacifist tradition to which the French-speaking socialists were still very attached. The Spanish Civil War contributed to radicalizing these opposing positions to the point of making them irreconcilable within the same political party.

In 1939, due to a disagreement over the German-Soviet Pact and following the Soviet invasion of Finland, the Genevan Socialist Party split in two. Léon Nicole, who supported the Treaty of Non-Aggression between Germany and the Union of Soviet Socialist Republics, was expelled from the Social Democratic Party of Switzerland in September 1939. However, the majority of members of the Vaud section and the Genevan Socialist Party, which had welcomed members of the Communist Party after its banning in Geneva in 1937, supported him and founded the Swiss Socialist Federation, with Léon Nicole as its president. André Oltramare and Charles Rosselet left Léon Nicole's Genevan Socialist Party to found the Socialist Party of Geneva, affiliated with the Social Democratic Party of Switzerland. The Socialist Party of Geneva resumed the name of Geneva Socialist Party in 1941 after the banning of Léon Nicole's Genevan Socialist Party.

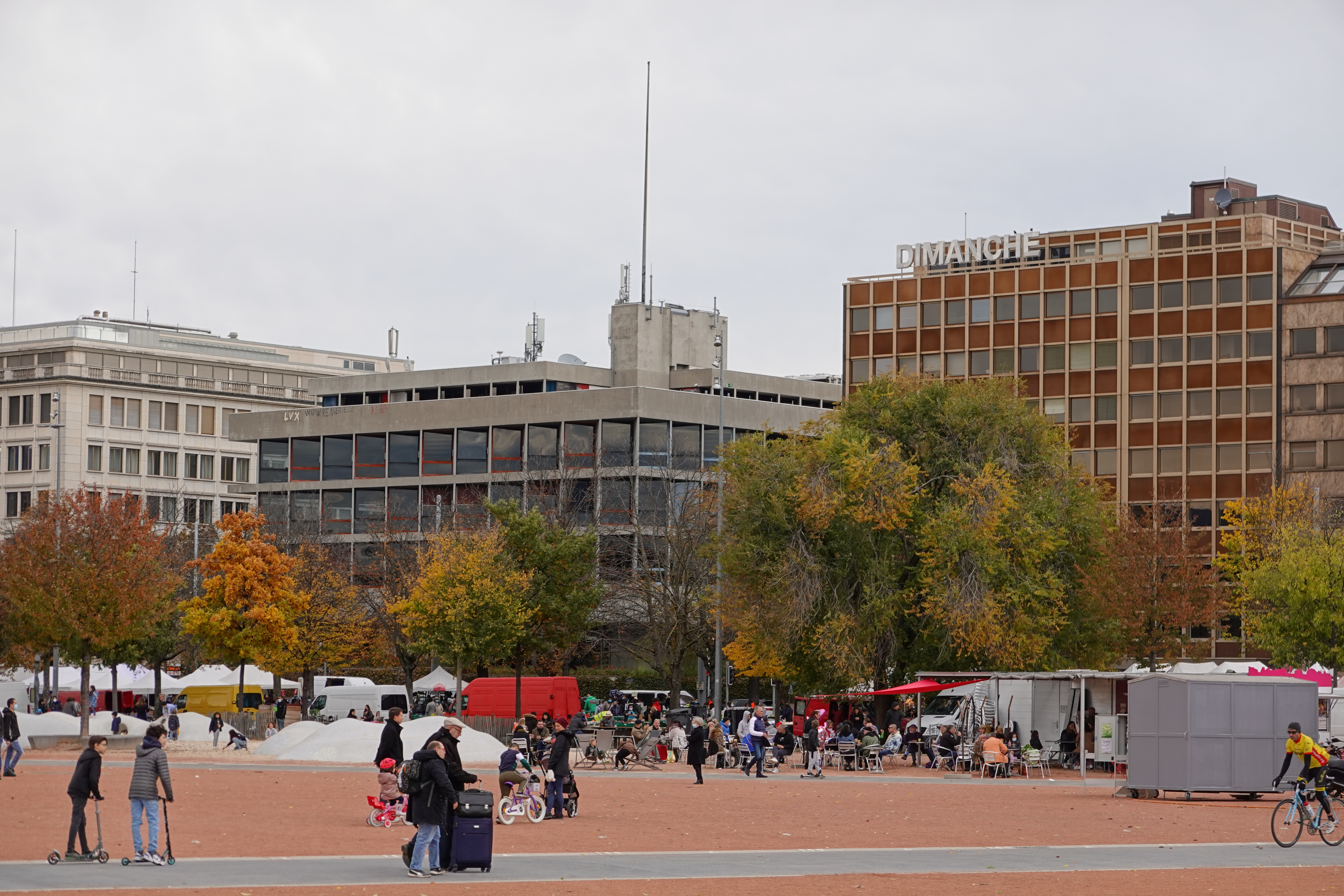
Uni Dufour seen from the Plainpalais plain

Nicknamed "the bunker" by its detractors, the Uni Dufour Building was constructed in the 1970s. Inspired by Le Corbusier, Werner-Charles Francesco, Gilbert Paux, and Jacques Vicari won the competition organized in 1965 after the fire at the bâtiment électoral (election building), demolished in 1911 and rebuilt in 1915. The election building could accommodate up to 3,000 people and was also used for exceptional occasions, such as in 1871, the internment of French soldiers during the Franco-Prussian War, one of the first large-scale humanitarian actions of the Red Cross. The rotunda housing the Bourbaki Panorama was built in 1880 on Boulevard de Plainpalais (now Boulevard Georges-Favon). In 1897, it was moved to La Jonction. The panorama then left Geneva to be reassembled in Lucerne in a building constructed in 1889.

A founding member of the International Committee of the Red Cross and forerunner of metrication in Switzerland, (Note: In 1855, the Dufour map (French: Carte Dufour), the first topographic map of Switzerland for which the metre was adopted as the unit of length, won the gold medal at the Exposition Universelle. On the sidelines of the Exposition Universelle (1855) and the second Congress of Statistics held in Paris, an association with a view to obtaining a uniform decimal system of measures, weights and currencies was created in 1855. A Committee for Weights and Measures and Monies (French: Comité des poids, mesures et monnaies) was created during the Exposition Universelle (1867) in Paris and called for the international adoption of the metric system.) Guillaume Henri Dufour contributed to the creation of the Central European Arc Measurement as a member of the Swiss Geodetic Commission from 1861. (Note: Following the Act of Mediation of 1803, Swiss cartography was entrusted to French geographical engineers. Geneva, which was part of France, was not affected by this issue. However, Ferdinand Rudolph Hassler, a former magistrate from Aargau in the Helvetic Republic, saw his prospects of creating a map of Switzerland dashed. He therefore emigrated to the United States of America where Albert Gallatin, then Secretary of the Treasury, was launching a call for tenders for heading the geodetic survey of East Coast of the United States. Hassler was appointed, with the endorsement of the American Philosophical Society, Superintendent of the United States Survey of the Coast, which would become the first civilian scientific agency of the federal government. At the time, geodesists incorporated reference points into a network of triangles. The relative positions of these points were determined by the angles of the triangles formed by the triangulation stations, and also by astronomical observations. Finally, the dimensions of the network of triangles were determined by measuring the length of one side of some of the triangles in the field using metal rulers. For measuring the baselines of the map survey of the American coast, Hassler designed a ruler equipped with microscopes, which he calibrated to the Committee Meter.) In 1858, an Egyptian Technical Commission had been set up to continue, by adopting the procedures instituted in Europe, the cadastre work, inaugurated by means of the cassaba (Qaṣbah قصبة an ancient Arabic unit of measurement), under Muhammad Ali. This Commission suggested to Viceroy Mohammed Sa'id Pasha the idea of building geodetic devices which were ordered in France. The Khedive entrusted to Ismail Mustafa al-Falaki the study, in Europe, of the precision apparatus calibrated against the metre intended to measure the geodetic baselines and already built by Jean Brunner in Paris. Ismail Mustafa had the task to carry out the experiments necessary for determining the expansion coefficients of the two platinum and brass rulers, and to compare Egyptian standard with a known standard. The Spanish standard designed by Carlos Ibáñez e Ibáñez de Ibero and Frutos Saavedra Meneses was chosen for this purpose, as it had served as a model for the construction of the Egyptian standard. In addition, the Spanish standard had been compared with Borda's double-toise N° 1, which served as a comparison module for the measurement of all geodetic baselines in France. (Note: Egypt was, after the United States of America and Spain in Europe, the first country in Africa to use a geodetic standard calibrated against the metre. The history of the metre reveals that it was then chosen as an international scientific unit of length by the European Arc Measurement which would later become the International Association of Geodesy. The inspiration for the creation of this association came to Johann Jacob Baeyer following the measurement of the geodetic arc of Struve. In 1867 at the second General Conference of the International Association of Geodesy held in Berlin, the question of an international standard unit of length was discussed in order to combine the measurements made in different countries to determine the size and shape of the Earth. According to a preliminary proposal made in Neuchâtel the precedent year, the General Conference of the European Arc Measurement recommended the adoption of the metre in replacement of the toise of Bessel. In 1869, the Saint Petersburg Academy of Sciences sent to the French Academy of Sciences a report drafted by Otto Wilhelm von Struve, Heinrich von Wild, and Moritz von Jacobi inviting his French counterpart to undertake joint action to ensure the universal use of the metric system in all scientific work. In 1954, the connection of the southerly extension of the Struve Geodetic Arc with an arc running north from South Africa through Egypt brought the course of a major meridian arc back to land where Eratosthenes had founded geodesy.) In 1866, in Neuchâtel, Carlos Ibáñez e Ibáñez de Ibero proposed the membership of Spain in the geodetic association. (Note: Since the metre was originally defined, each time a new measurement is made, with more accurate instruments, methods or techniques, it is said that the metre is based on some error, from calculations or measurements. When Carlos Ibáñez e Ibáñez de Ibero took part to the extension of the arc measurement of Delambre and Méchain, mathematicians like Legendre and Gauss had developed new methods for processing data, including the least squares method which allowed to compare experimental data tainted with observational errors to a mathematical model. Until the Hayford ellipsoid would be introduced in 1910, vertical deflections would be considered as random errors. The Earth measurements thus underscored the importance of the scientific method at a time when statistics were implemented in geodesy. As a leading scientist of his time, Ibáñez was one of the 81 initial members of the International Statistical Institute (ISI) and delegate of Spain to the first ISI session (now called World Statistic Congress) in Rome in 1887.) In Rome, in 1887, the International Geodetic Association and the International Committee for Weights and Measures were represented at the first session of the International Statistical Institute (ISI) by their president, Carlos Ibáñez de Ibero, first director of the Geographic and Statistical Institute, member of the Royal Academy of Exact, Physical and Natural Sciences, honorary member of the National Academy of Sciences of Córdoba, correspondent of the French Academy of Sciences, associate of the Royal Academy of Belgium and honorary member of the Prussian Academy of Sciences. (Note: The International Statistical Institute (ISI) was founded in 1885 during the jubilee of the Royal Statistical Society, and coinciding with the 25th anniversary of the Société statistique de Paris. Its origins can be traced back to a series of International Statistical Congresses, the first of which was chaired by Adolphe Quetelet and held in Brussels in 1853 after the Great Exhibition held in London at the initiative of Prince Albert of Saxe-Coburg and Gotha. The 81 founding members of the ISI constituted the elite of statisticians of this era within government administrations and scientific academies.) In the second half of the 19th century, this scientific undertaking, whose objective was precise mapping, took on a global dimension. It accompanied German unification and the return of democracy in France, marked the beginning of the Second Industrial Revolution, and led to the Metre Convention, (Note: In 1834, Ferdinand Rudolph Hassler measured at Fire Island the first baseline of the Survey of the Coast. Ferdinand Rudolph Hassler's use of the metre and the creation of the Office of Standard Weights and Measures as an office within the Coast Survey contributed to the introduction of the Metric Act of 1866 allowing the use of the metre in the United States, and preceded the choice of the metre as international scientific unit of length and the proposal by the 1867 General Conference of the European Arc Measurement (German: Europäische Gradmessung) to establish the International Bureau of Weights and Measures.) the adoption of Greenwich meridian as Prime meridian and a new definition of the metre. (Note: In 1875 a number of American, Asian, African and European states concluded the Metre Convention, and in 1877 an international weights-and-measures bureau was established at Breteuil. Until this time the metre was determined by the end-surfaces of a platinum rod (mètre des archives); subsequently, rods of platinum-iridium, of cross-section H, were constructed, having engraved lines at both ends of the bridge, which determine the distance of a metre. As bar lengths vary with temperature, precise measurements required known and stable temperatures and could even be affected by a scientist's body heat, so standard metres were provided with precise thermometers. The thermometers required for this purpose must be very carefully studied, and their errors of division and index error determined. The representation of the unit of length by means of the distance between two fine lines on the surface of a bar of metal at a certain temperature is never itself free from uncertainty and probable error, owing to the difficulty of knowing at any moment the precise temperature of the bar; and the transference of this unit, or a multiple of it, to a measuring bar will be affected not only with errors of observation, but with errors arising from uncertainty of temperature of both bars. If the measuring bar be not self-compensating for temperature, its expansion must be determined by very careful experiments. Careful comparisons with several standard toises showed that the Mètre des Archives was not exactly equal to the legal metre or 443.296 lines of the toise of Peru, but, in round numbers, 1/(75 000) of the length smaller, or approximately 0.013 millimetres. The metre according to the older relation is called the “legal metre,” according to the new relation the “international metre.”) (Note: The creation of the United States Coast and Geodetic Survey led to the actual definition of the metre, with Charles Sanders Peirce being the first to experimentally link the metre to the wavelength of a spectral line. Charles Sanders Peirce's work promoted the advent of American science at the forefront of global metrology. Alongside his intercomparisons of artifacts of the metre and contributions to gravimetry through improvement of reversible pendulum, Peirce was the first to tie experimentally the metre to the wave length of a spectral line. According to him the standard length might be compared with that of a wave of light identified by a line in the solar spectrum. Albert Abraham Michelson soon took up the idea and improved it. Progress in science finally allowed the definition of the metre to be dematerialised; thus in 1960 a new definition based on a specific number of wavelengths of light from a specific transition in krypton-86 allowed the standard to be universally available by measurement. In 1983 this was updated to a length defined in terms of the speed of light; this definition was reworded in 2019: The metre, symbol m, is the SI unit of length. It is defined by taking the fixed numerical value of the speed of light in vacuum c to be 299792458 when expressed in the unit m⋅s^{−1}, where the second is defined in terms of the caesium frequency Δν_{Cs}. Where older traditional length measures are still used, they are now defined in terms of the metre – for example the yard has since 1959 officially been defined as exactly 0.9144 metre.)

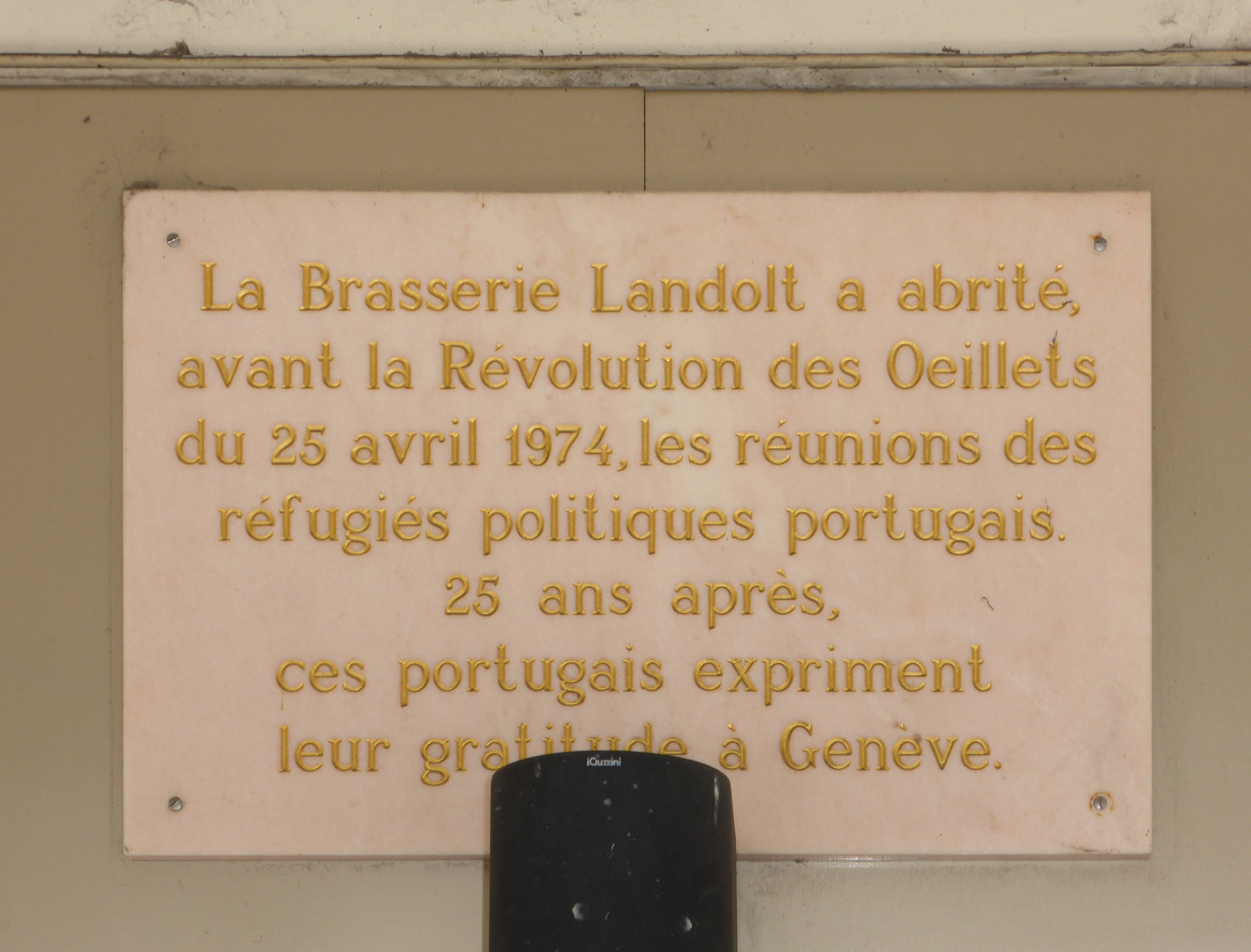
Commemorative plaque on the facade of the former Landolt Brewery

In 1905, the first Geneva International Motor Show was hosted in the election building also named the Maison des Congrès (Congress House). Opposite this building at the intersection of Rue De-Candolle and Rue du Conseil-Général, the Brasserie Landolt (1875–1999) was frequented by Lenin, Chaim Weizmann, then by Portuguese refugees preparing for the Carnation Revolution.

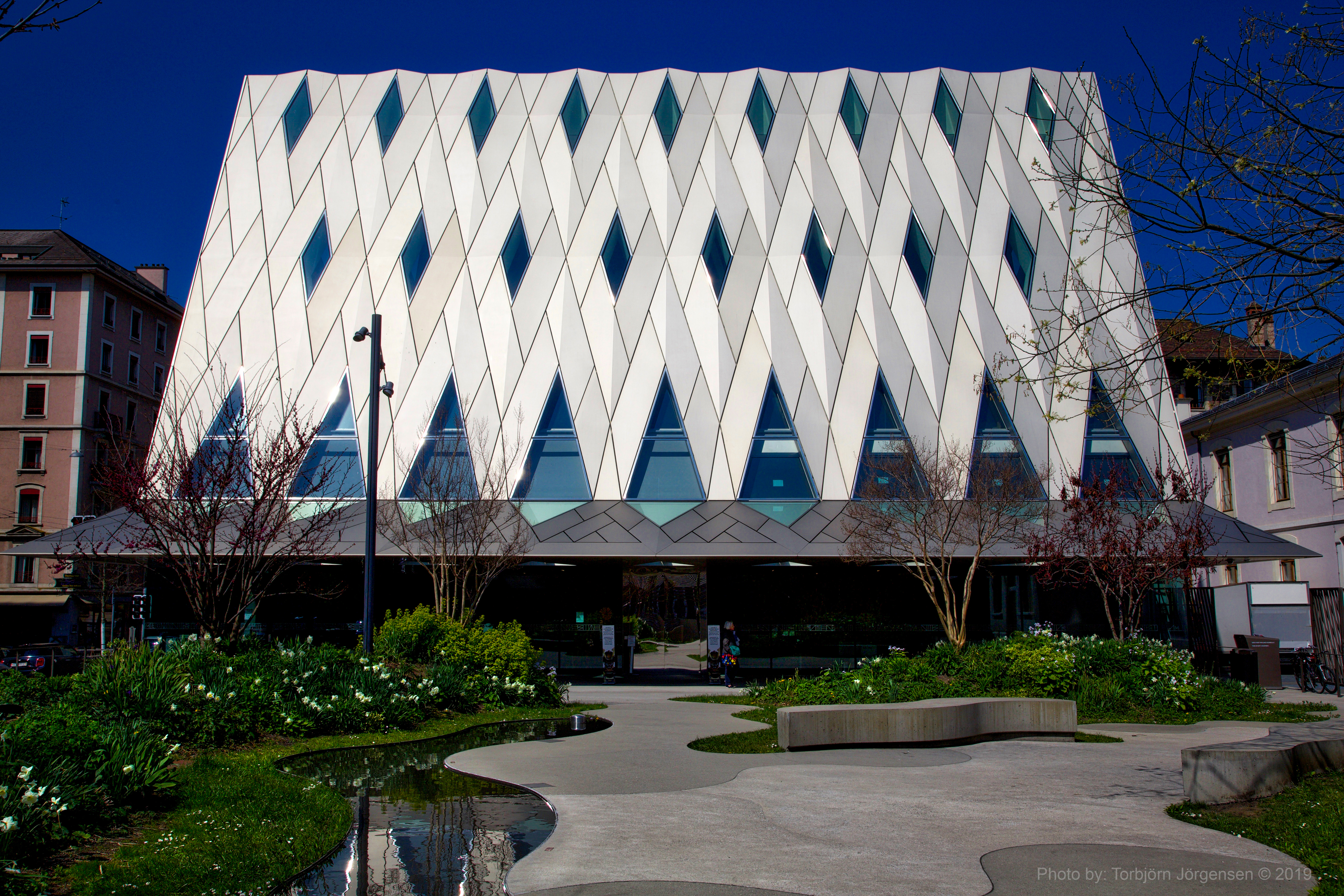
Musée d'ethnographie de Genève

Inaugurated on September 25, 1901, the Musée d'ethnographie de Genève was founded at the initiative of Professor Eugène Pittard, who also established a chair of anthropology at the University of Geneva. In 1939, the museum moved to the disused Mail primary school building on Boulevard Carl-Vogt. The new MEG building, shaped like a pagoda, was inaugurated on October 31, 2014, after a four-year construction project. The museum is listed as a cultural asset of national importance and won the European Museum of the Year Award in April 2017. The issue of the restitution of looted works also arises, particularly with the 2017 motion by Cédric Wermuth, which aimed to locate objects dating from the colonial period within Switzerland and return them to their countries of origin. The case of a tusk taken from the sack of Benin City in 1897 and purchased in the 1940s is cited by the Geneva Museum of Ethnography, which highlighted this theme in its 2020-2024 strategic plan.

The Patek Philippe Museum, a private Swiss watch museum, is located at the Rue des Vieux-Genadiers 7, in the Plainpalais district of Geneva. The Patek Philippe company was founded in Geneva by Antoni Patek, a Polish independence fighter and political activist during Russian occupation of Poland, in 1839.

A museum is dedicated to the commune of Plainpalais before its absorption by the city in 1931. This museum was created in 1953 by the Plainpalais Interests Association. It is located in the former Plainpalais town hall, at 35 Boulevard du Pont-d'Arve, on the first floor.

== Plaine de Plainpalais ==
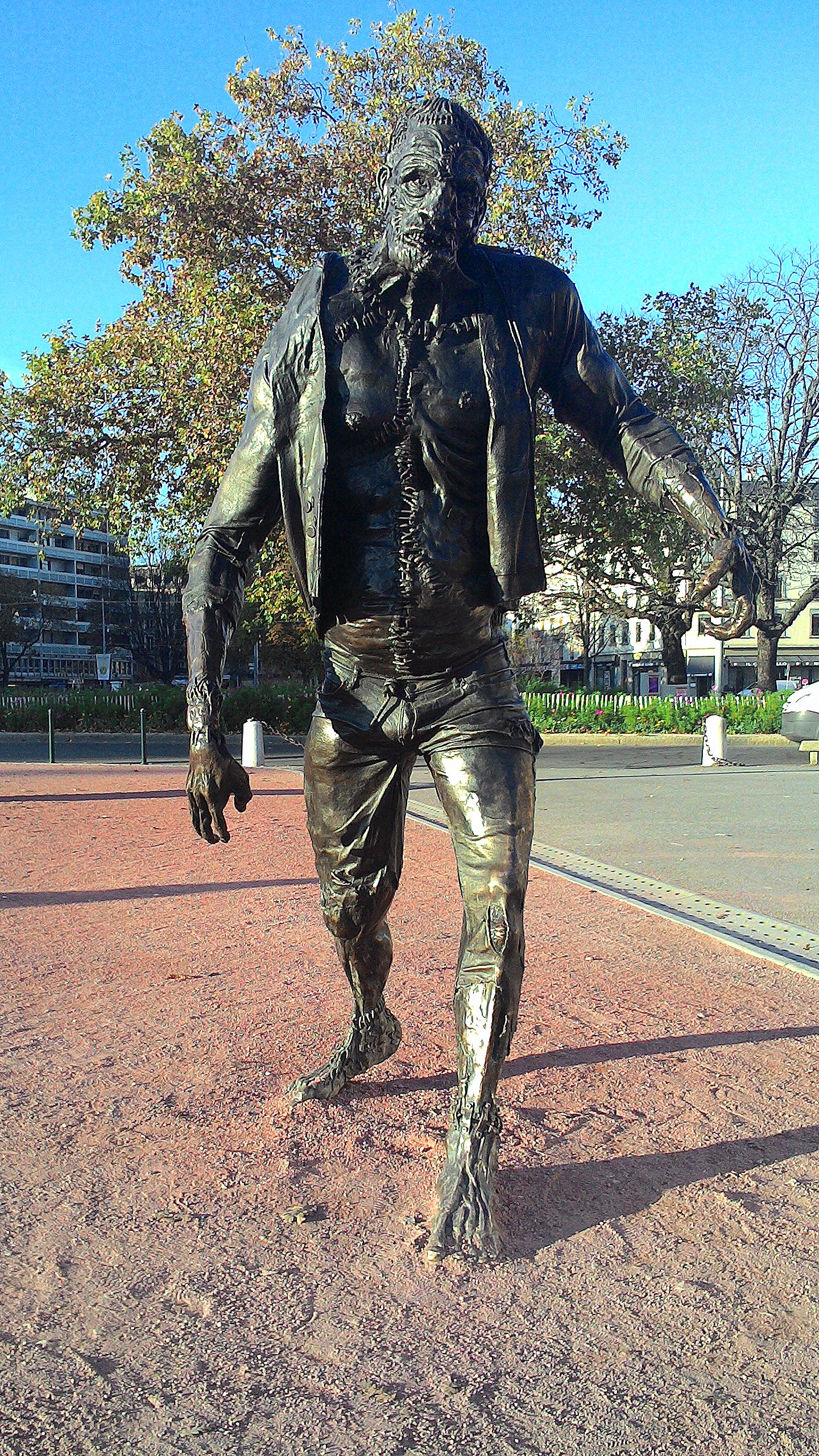
Frankenstein's monster

The Plaine de Plainpalais is a large public square (78 135 square metres). It is mentioned in Mary Shelley's Frankenstein. It is home of the Plainpalais skatepark. Inaugurated in 2012, the Plainpalais skatepark is intended for young people over the age of 10 who practise skateboarding, roller skating and BMX riding at any level. Covering 3,000 m^{2}, it is one of the biggest skate parks in Europe.

In 2010, the Municipal Fund for Contemporary Art commissioned the KLAT collective, specializing in performance and contemporary art, to create a statue representing Dr. Frankenstein's creature. The first murder of the famous monster imagined by Mary Shelley in her novel Frankenstein; or, The Modern Prometheus, during her stay in Cologny in 1816, took place in Plainpalais. Installed in 2014 near the skatepark, the statue faces south, recalling the creature's flight towards Chamonix, during which it was observed by Victor Frankenstein climbing Mont Salève, visible from the Plainpalais plain. Contrary to popular belief, the monster possesses human feelings, and it is rejection that leads him to murder. The work also evokes certain figures of marginality and offers them visibility in the public space.

Made up of several lawns and an asphalted section, the extreme tip of the diamond shape of the Plainpalais plain, cut by the Harry-Marc street, on the Place du Cirque side, has been developed into a garden adorned with a fountain, the Parc du 14-juin, formerly Parc Harry-Marc. The Harry-Marc Park was renamed on May 20, 2024, in reference to June 14, 1981, the date on which the principle of equality between men and women was enshrined in the Swiss Constitution.

Harry Marc, whose real name was Gilbert Pichon, was the owner of the Café des Beaux-Arts, a regular haunt for actors and politicians such as Michel Simon, Jean Marais, Fernand Reynaud, and François Mitterrand. His greatest achievement was the creation of the Free Commune of Plainpalais Foundation, a philanthropic association whose symbol is a pelican holding out its alms bowl to the Genevan eagle. At a funfair he organized annually, Gilbert Pichon, disguised as the mayor, would have himself weighed and collect his weight in coins, which were then donated to his charities.

== See also ==
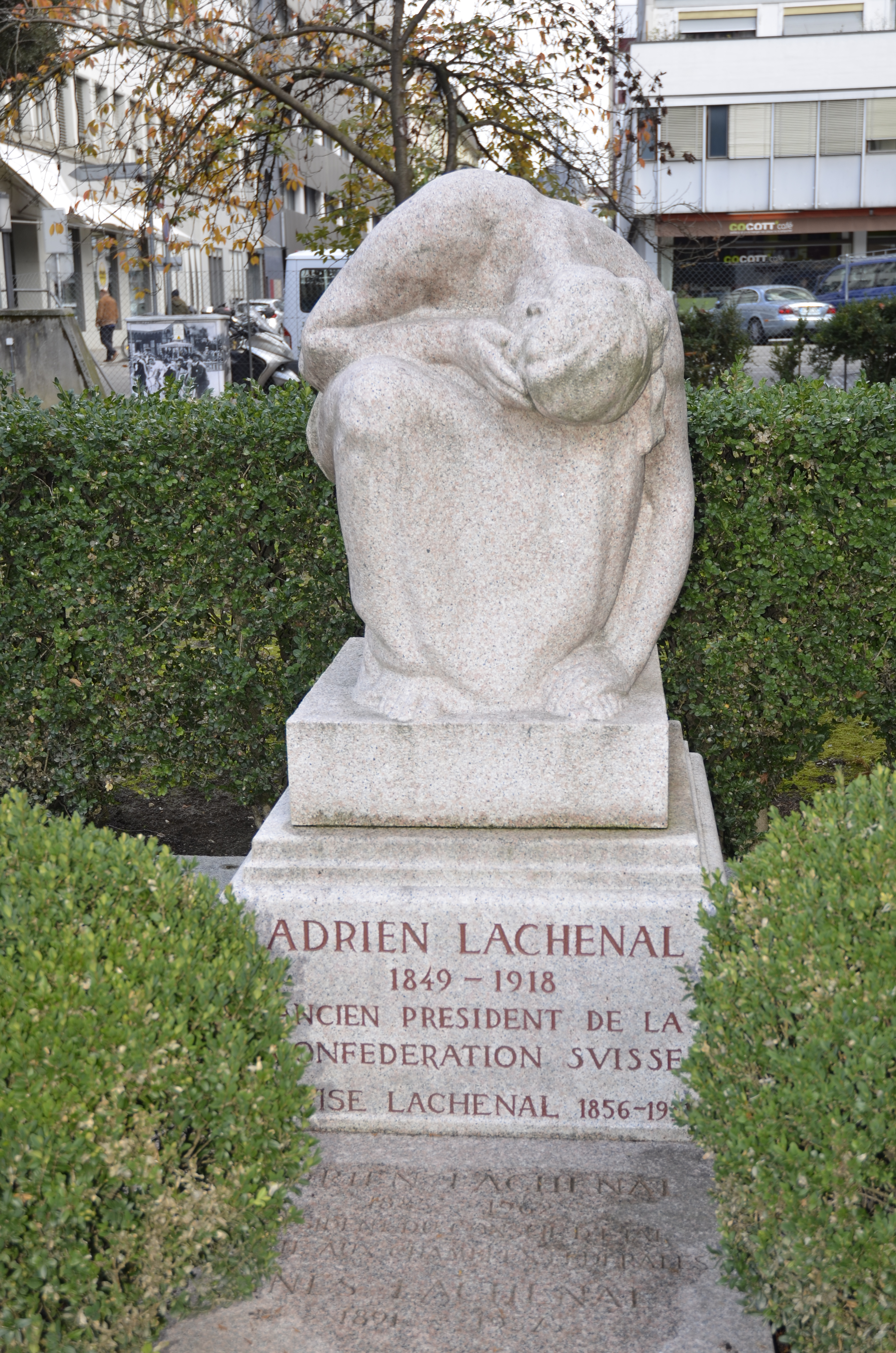
Tomb of Adrien Lachenal, Cimetière des Rois, Geneva.

- Aga Khan V
- Renée Bordier
- Micheline Calmy-Rey
- Suzanne Ferrière
- Liebmann Hersch
- Pierre Krähenbühl
- Juliette Lasserre
- Lisa Mazzone
- Lucie Odier
- Tariq Ramadan
- Emanuele Filiberto of Savoy, Prince of Venice
- Henri Schmitt
- Louis Segond
- Marie Tourte-Cherbuliez
- Lucien Tronchet
- Carina Tyrrell
- Anne-Marie Walters
- Assisted reproductive technology
- Hans Wilsdorf Foundation
