= Comédie de Genève =

Theater in Geneva, Switzerland

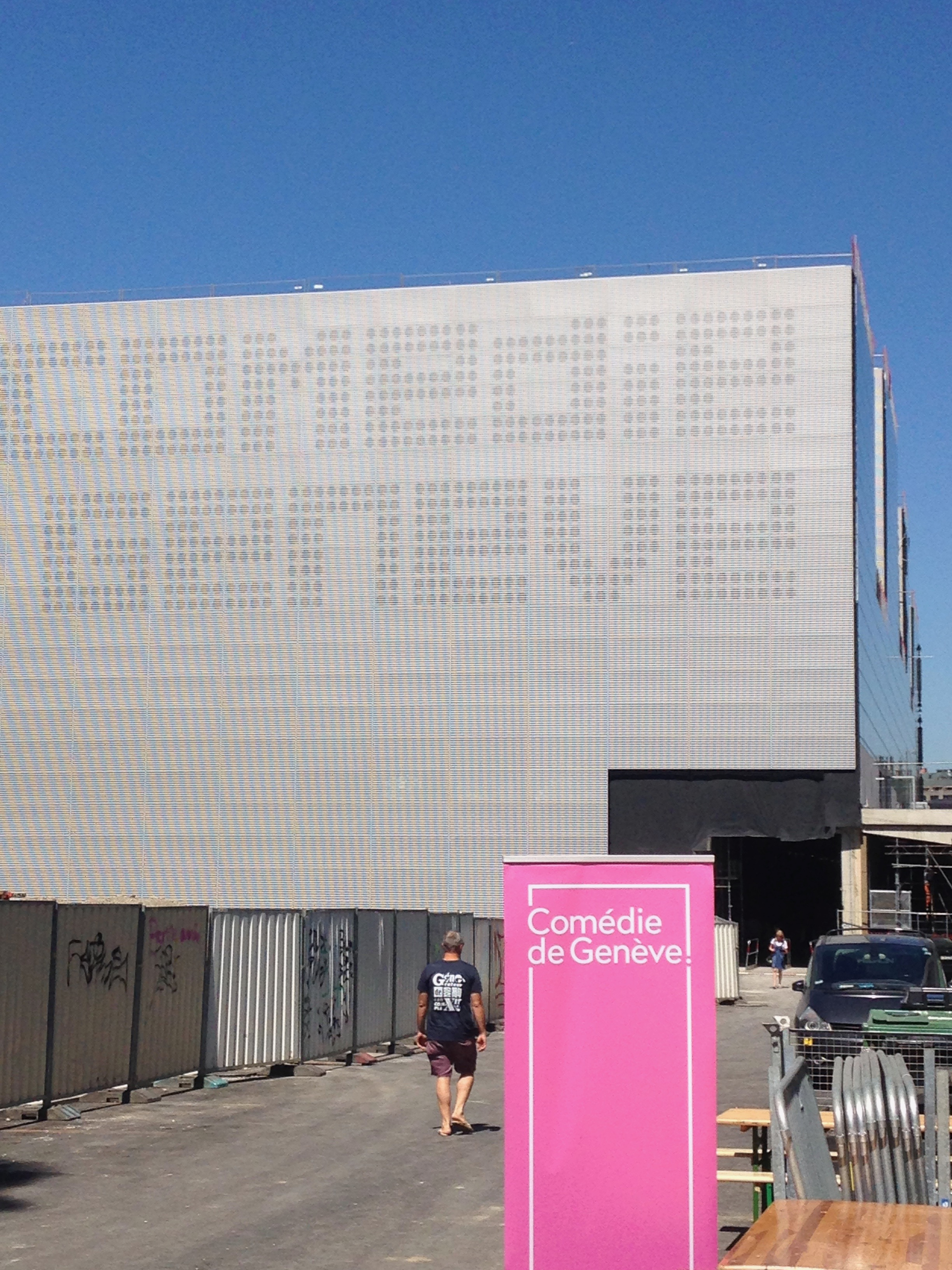
Current building

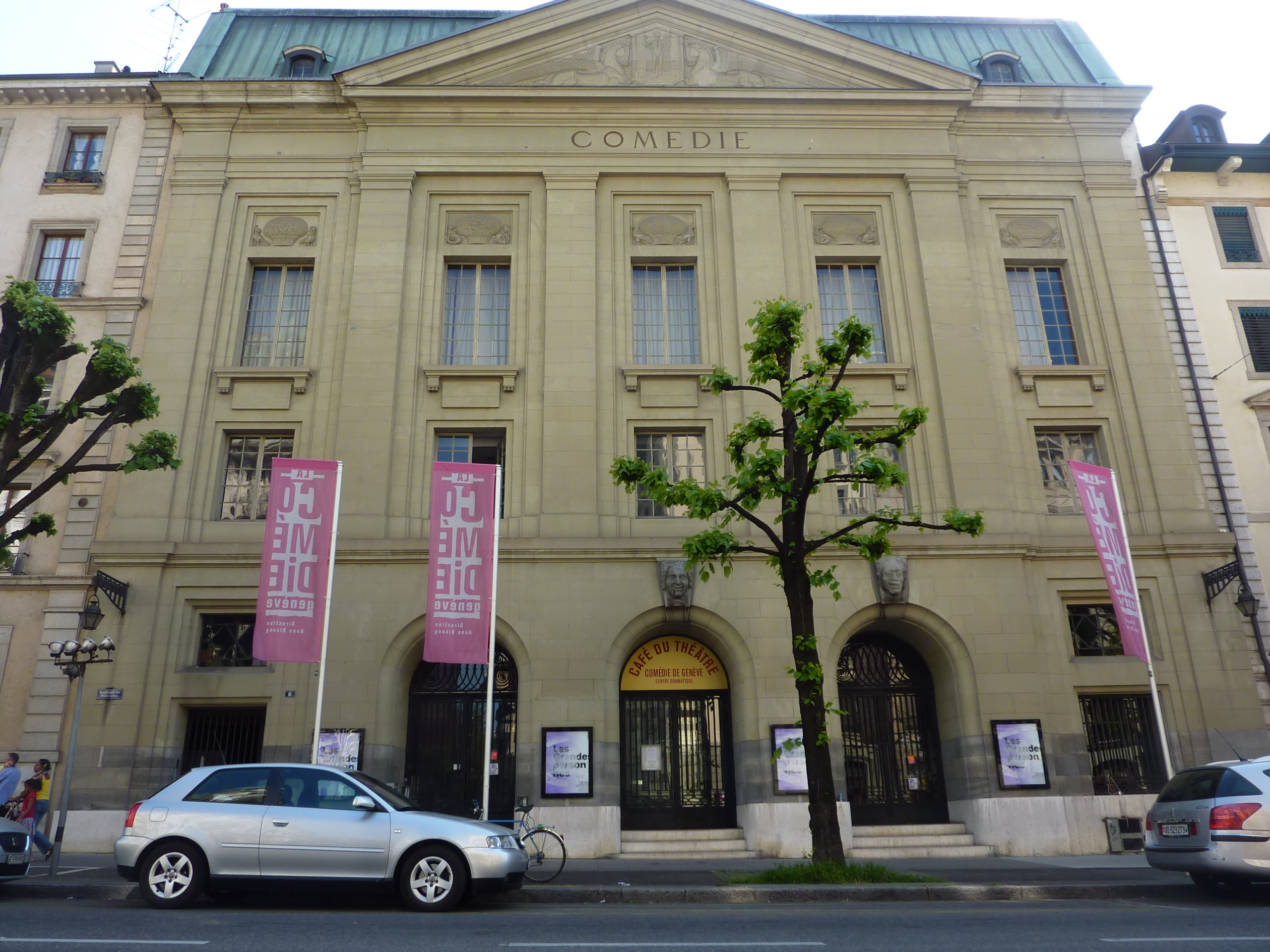
Comédie de Genève in 2011 (previous building)

Comédie de Genève (CDG) is a theatre in Eaux-Vives, Geneva, Switzerland.

Ernest Fournier created a theatre troupe in 1909. A dedicated building opened on 24 January 1913.

Previously Anne Bisang was the director. In July 2011 Hervé Loichemol was scheduled to become the director.

A new facility was scheduled to open, and it did so in 2021.

== See also ==
- Plainpalais
