= Marie Tourte-Cherbuliez =

Swiss writer, translator, and literary critic (1793–1863)

- Born: 12 April 1793; Geneva, Switzerland
- Died: 15 August 1863 (aged 70); Plainpalais, Switzerland
- Occupations: Writer, translator, literary critic

Marie Tourte-Cherbuliez, born on 12 April 1793 in Geneva, died on 15 August 1863 in Plainpalais, was a Swiss writer of children's literature, translator, and literary critic.

== Biography ==
=== Early life and family ===
Marie-Isaline Cherbuliez was born on 12 April 1793 in Geneva. She was the eldest of six children of bookseller Abraham Cherbuliez and his wife Louise-Sara Cornuaud. With her brothers Antoine-Élisée and Joël Cherbuliez, she grew up in Geneva's intellectual elite. In 1816, she married Barthélemy-Isaac Tourte, a teacher at the Geneva College

=== Literary critic and translation ===
An admirer of the educator Johann Heinrich Pestalozzi, Marie Tourte-Cherbuliez dedicated herself to children's literature. She began by writing reviews of works by Jeremias Gotthelf in the Bulletins littéraires, then translated the historical novel Der Knabe des Tell (1846) into French as Le fils de Tell in 1850. This was the first French translation of the work, which helped revive Swiss patriotic sentiment

Marie Tourte-Cherbuliez also translated English works by British writers Jane Marcet and Anthony Trollope. She additionally wrote reviews of works by William Thackeray

=== Books ===
Her own books focus on education, family, and religious virtues, such as Annette Gervais. Scènes de famille, published in 1835, and La fille du pasteur Raumer. Scènes familières, from 1848. Her stories typically feature a young girl as the main character. Receiving positive reviews, her works were translated into German and English

She is one of the few prose authors of her time in French-speaking Switzerland and belongs to the last generation of Swiss women writers of sentimental and pedagogical literature.

=== Legacy ===
Marie Tourte-Cherbuliez died in Plainpalais, near Geneva, on 15 August 1863. From her marriage to Barthélemy-Isaac Tourte, she had three children, including the future State Councillor Abraham Tourte

== Works ==
- Journal d'Amélie, ou dix-huit mois de la vie d'une jeune fille. Scènes de famille, 2 volumes, 1834.
- Annette Gervais. Scènes de famille, 1835.
- Contes et récits pour la jeunesse, 1st series, 1836.
- La fille du pasteur Raumer. Scènes familières, 1848.
- L'enfant patriote, 1851.
