= Jonval turbine =

Water turbine design

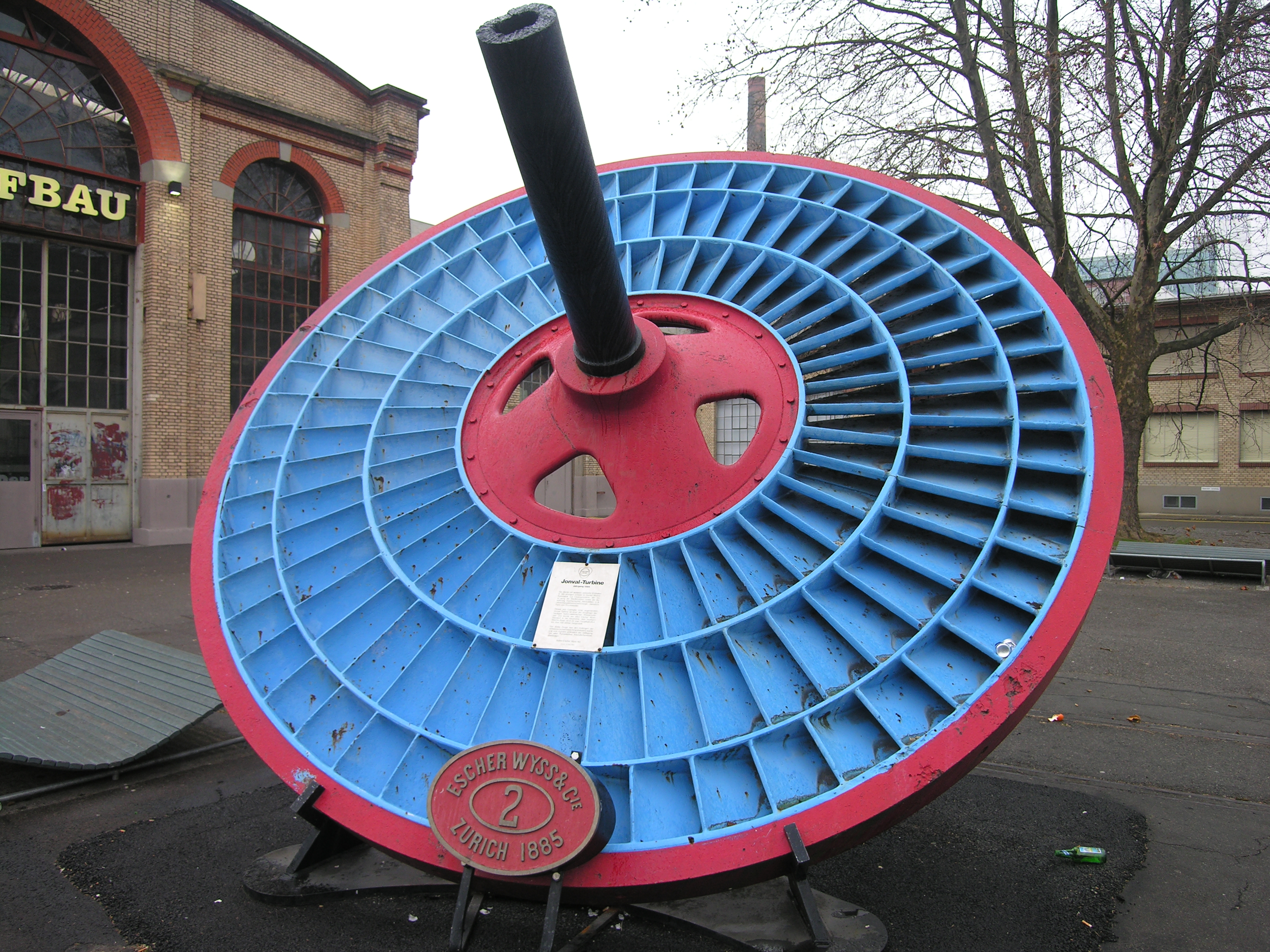
A Jonval turbine, built in 1885. It was in service for about 100 years in a Geneva pump station, where energy in the form of pressurized water was produced for the local industry. Over pressure in the network was released through the world-famous Jet d'Eau. In total, 17 such turbines were operating in the pump station.

The Jonval turbine is a water turbine design invented in France in 1837 and introduced to the United States around 1850 and were widely used. The Jonval turbine is a "mixed-flow" turbine design. Mixed-flow designs were well suited for the low-head applications common in the eastern United States. The smaller size, higher speed, higher power, lower cost, and ability to operate efficiently with variable water levels caused these and other types of hydraulic turbines to replace the vertical waterwheel as the primary source of power in American industries.

The Jonval turbine is a horizontal waterwheel. The water descends through fixed curved guide vanes which direct the flow sideways onto curved vanes on the runner. It is named after Feu Jonval, who invented it. The Jonval incorporated ideas from European mathematicians and engineers, including the use of curved blades. This new turbine failed to satisfy the public interest in seeing the water wheels in action, which was likely accepted as a minor drawback at that time.

This type is efficient at full gate, but at partial gate some Francis turbine designs are more efficient. The usual orientation of the wheel was horizontal and the first devices were even alternatively named as "horizontal water wheels". However, some sources mention turbines with both vertical and horizontal shafts.

N.F. Burnham, an American turbine manufacturer, patented numerous improved designs in the second half of 19th century. His turbines had greater efficiency than the Jonval, especially at partial gate, and fewer maintenance problems.
