= Théodore Turrettini =

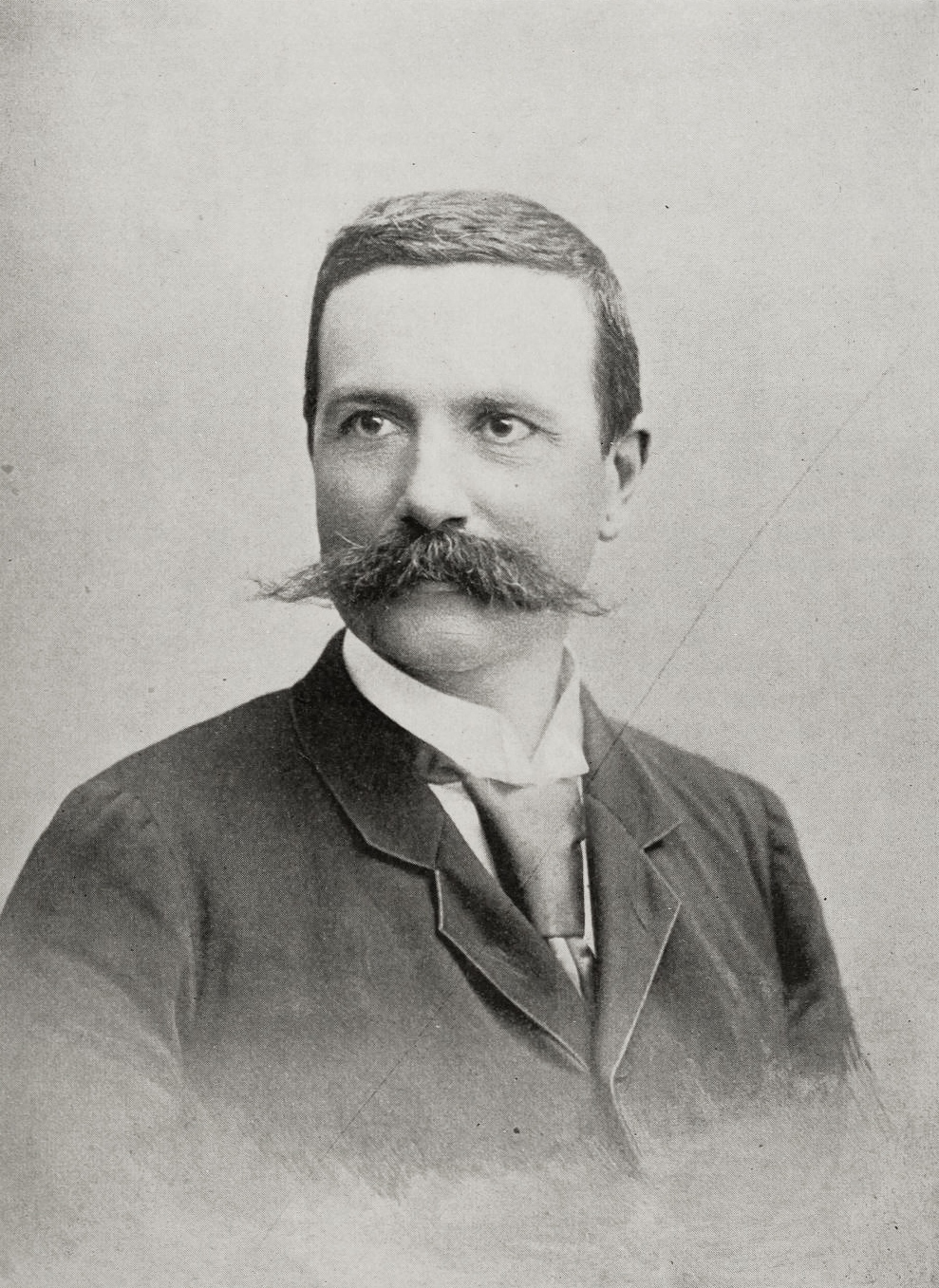
- Born: 27 April 1845; Geneva
- Died: October 7, 1916; Geneva
- Scientific career
- Fields: engineering

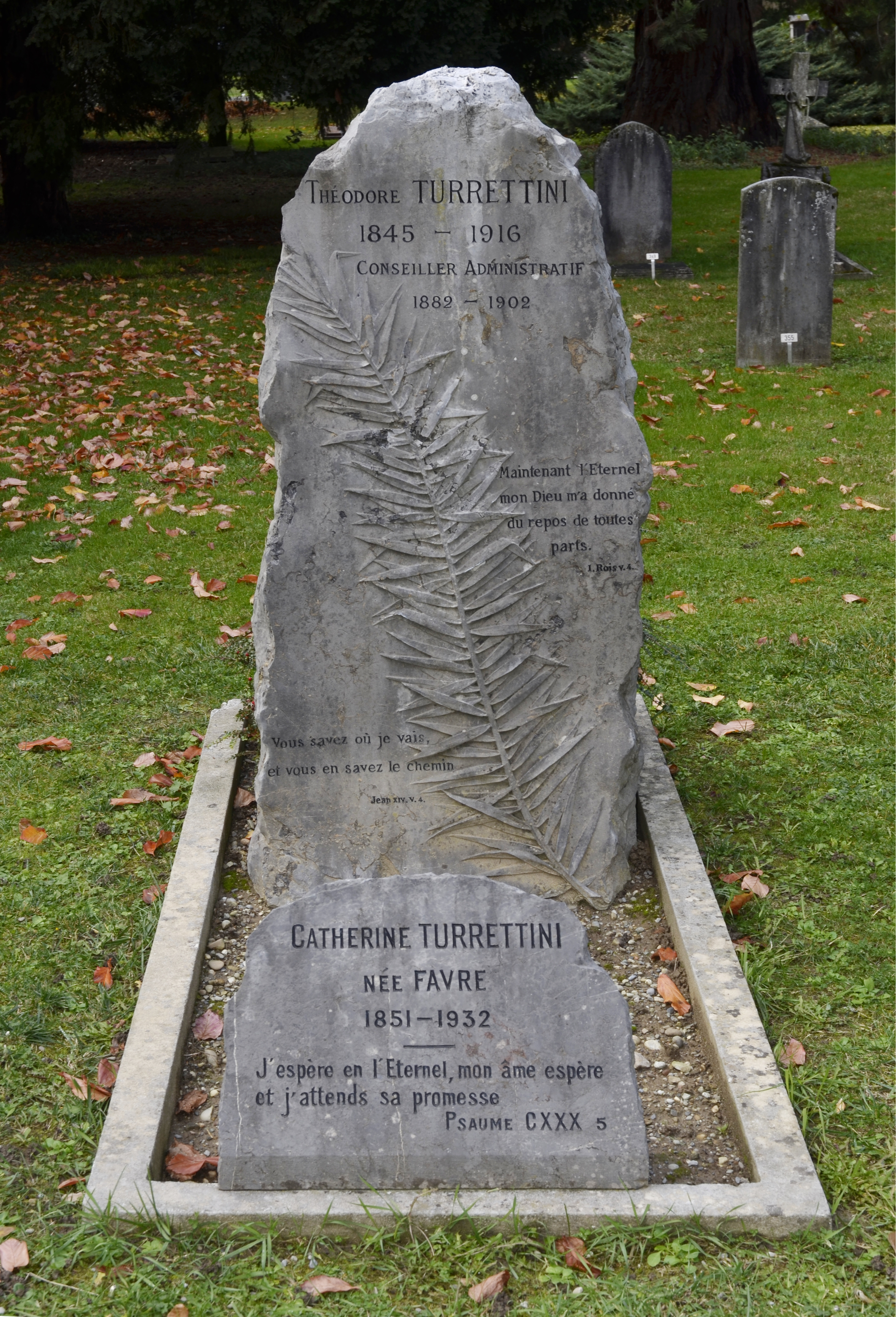
Tomb of Théodore and Catherine Turrettini, Kings Cemetery, Geneva.

Théodore Turrettini (1845–1916) was a Swiss engineer and politician.

== Life ==
Théodore Turrettini was trained as an engineer at the Polytechnic School of Lausanne, where he graduated in 1867. He then left Switzerland to train in a workshop in Frankfurt, and at the Siemens & Halske factory in Berlin. He later spent a short while in Paris. Back to Geneva in 1870, he became director of the "Society of Physical Instruments", a position he would keep until his death. His duties included the development of precision instruments, of machines and of drills for the St.Gothard tunnel. He also attempted to collaborate with Raoul Pictet in order to develop machines for producing cold.

After a two-month internship at Thomas Edison's workshop in New York, he even launched himself into electric lighting.

Turrettini's main achievement was the creation of hydroelectric power stations in Geneva, which were the most powerful of the time.

Turrettini was elected an International Member of the American Philosophical Society. In 1891, Turrettini became a member of the International Niagara Commission.

== See also ==
- Plainpalais

== Sources ==
- Paquier, Serge, "Turrettini, Théodore", in Dictionnaire Historique de la Suisse (in French).
