= Les Eaux-Vives =

Former Swiss municipality, now district of Geneva

- Former municipality
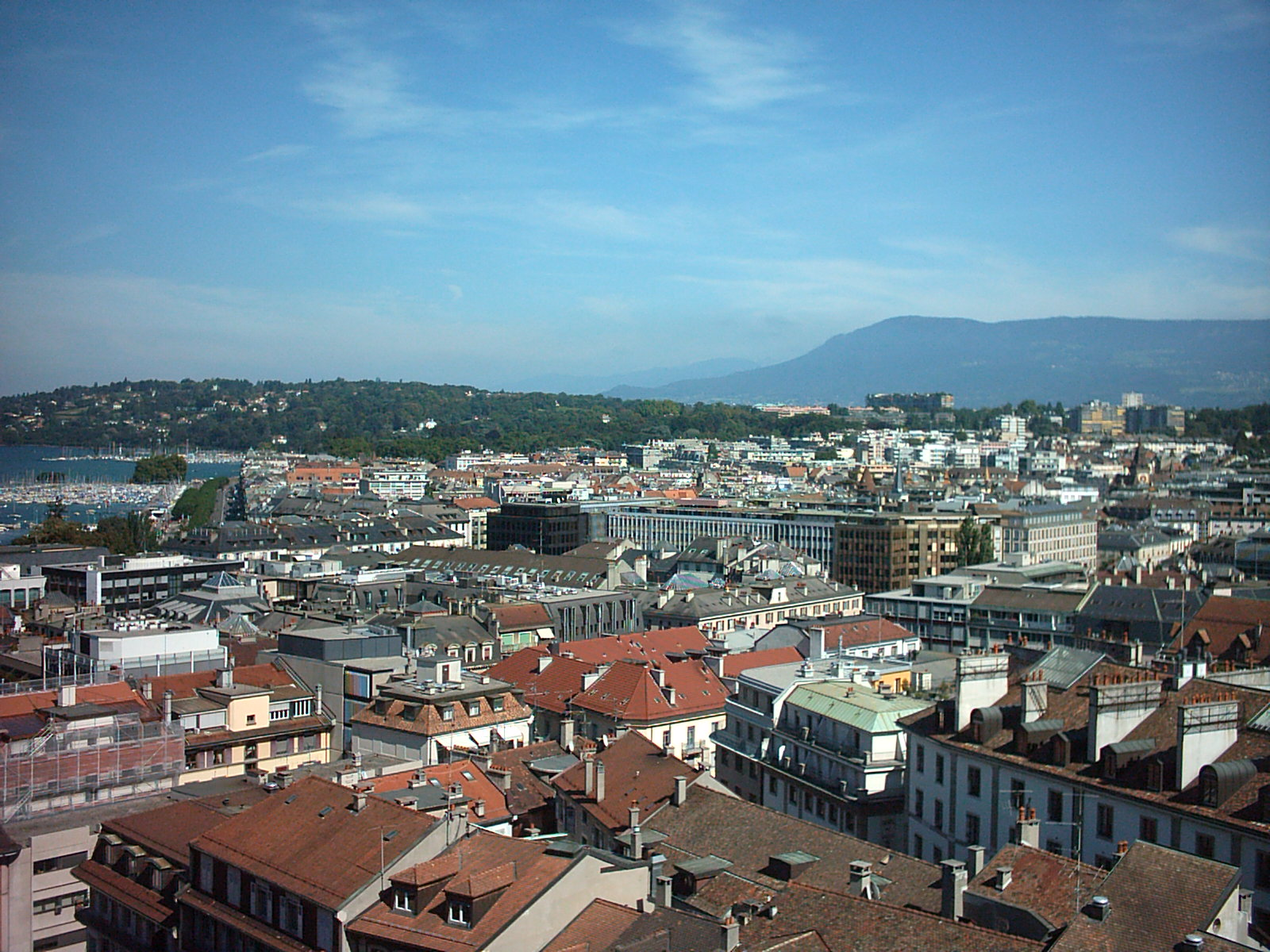
- View of Eaux-Vives from Saint-Pierre Cathedral

- Flag Coat of arms
- Etymology: From Latin "aqua viva" (living water)
- Motto: Aquis vivis felicitas
- Location in Switzerland
- Coordinates: 46°12′N 6°10′E
- Country: Switzerland
- Canton: Geneva
- Municipality established: 1798
- Municipality dissolved: 1931

Population (1930)
  - Total: 20,917
- Time zone: UTC+1 (CET)
  - Summer (DST): UTC+2 (CEST)

Les Eaux-Vives was a municipality in the Canton of Geneva, Switzerland, from 1798 to 1931. Located on the left bank of Lake Geneva, it was incorporated into the City of Geneva on 1 January 1931, along with Plainpalais and Le Petit-Saconnex. Today, Les Eaux-Vives forms a district of Geneva comprising the neighborhoods of Contamines, Florissant, Malagnou, Montchoisy, Villereuse, and Vollandes, as well as the residential areas of Allières, Grande Boissière, Petite Boissière, La Cuisine, and Grange-Canal.

== Etymology ==
The name "Eaux-Vives" derives from the numerous natural springs that flowed below Montchoisy, providing Geneva with drinking water. The earliest recorded mention dates to 1442 as "iuxta nontum Fontium Vivorum" (Latin for "near the hill of living springs").

== History ==
=== Medieval period ===
Archaeological evidence indicates human presence in the area from the Neolithic and Bronze Age periods, with several lake shore settlements discovered. In 1888, excavations in the current Parc La Grange revealed a Roman villa dating from the second half of the 1st century CE.

The oldest known artistic representation of Les Eaux-Vives appears in Conrad Witz's 1444 painting "The Miraculous Draught of Fishes," which forms part of the Saint-Pierre altarpiece. Before the Protestant Reformation, the territory belonged to the parish of La Madeleine. In 1727, Les Eaux-Vives was attached to the parish of Cologny until the creation of a pastoral position in 1831.

Located outside Geneva's city walls but within the Franchises territory, Les Eaux-Vives formed part of the prosperous Temple suburb, named after the church founded there by the Knights Templar in the 12th century. Houses clustered primarily along the lakefront and around the marshy terrain of Pré-l'Évêque, where members of the archery guild, whose earliest statutes date from 1529, practiced their sport since the Middle Ages.

=== Destruction and renewal ===
For military security reasons, this suburb, along with four others surrounding Geneva, was destroyed by the Genevans in the 1530s-1540s. The faubourgs only began to revive from the 18th century onwards. Fishermen, boatmen, and artisans then repopulated Les Eaux-Vives, and calico factories, including that of Jean-Philippe Petit, established themselves there. The decline of the calico industry began in 1785 due to protectionist measures taken by the French government, and these industries completely disappeared around 1830-1835.

=== French period and municipal creation ===
After Geneva's annexation by France in 1798, Les Eaux-Vives became a political commune. Its municipal council met for the first time on 28 December 1800. During this period, the commune's functions remained simple: managing the port, maintaining lake shores, and road works formed the primary concerns of this modest municipality.

The construction of the Port de la Scie in 1836-1838, the first major port outside Geneva's walls, became an important source of revenue for the commune, particularly through rental fees for merchandise storage areas.

=== 19th century urban development ===
With the demolition of Geneva's fortifications beginning in 1850, urban expansion could develop. This marked the first step toward the merger of Les Eaux-Vives with the city of Geneva. New Genevan neighborhoods built on the freed land connected with the commune of Les Eaux-Vives and accelerated its urbanization. Numerous thoroughfares were created to facilitate communication with the city, and in 1864, a tram line was opened connecting Rive to Chêne-Bougeries.

The construction by the French in 1888 of Vollandes station (now Genève-Eaux-Vives railway station), terminus of the Annemasse-Geneva line, was part of a vast project to extend this line to Geneva's main Cornavin station, which would have enabled the connection of the Lyon-Geneva line to the Savoy network. This project never materialized, though the station was eventually connected to Cornavin station when the CEVA line opened in 2019.

=== Municipal administration ===
Initially, the municipal council and mayor met at the mayor's residence. In 1809, the municipal council decided to acquire a "commune chamber" on the first floor of the Rucker house at Pré-l'Évêque. A more substantial town hall was built in 1828 at the edge of the archery ground, but this proved too small and humid. In 1843, the commune rented the small Malan house at Pré-l'Évêque, and finally, in 1853, a new town hall was constructed on the Couteau property based on plans by architect M. Krieg.

A new, more elaborate town hall was commissioned in 1905, with a budget of 450,000 francs. Architect Léon Bovy was chosen for the project, and the cornerstone was laid on 30 May 1907. The building was inaugurated on 15 February 1909 by Mayor John Gignoux (1904-1918), costing 570,079 francs. Today, following the 1930 merger, this building serves as the official town hall of the City of Geneva and houses the marriage ceremony hall.

=== Religious and educational development ===
The commune created a pastoral position in 1831, with pastor John Duby serving until 1863. Although the commune had a pastor, it lacked a church, with services held in the school hall. A subscription was organized in 1838, raising 27,000 francs, and the commune purchased part of the Olivet property (formerly Saint-Ours) for 15,000 francs. The Gothic church was built on plans by architect Louis Brocher, with the cornerstone laid on 2 June 1841 and dedication taking place on 7 August 1842.

Following the separation of church and state voted on 15 June 1907, the temple, previously commune property, became property of the Consistory of the National Protestant Church of Geneva on 8 April 1910.

The commune also developed its educational infrastructure significantly. An "infant asylum," ancestor of today's kindergartens, was created by Mrs. Simon-Chauvet, with the municipal council granting a subsidy of 315 florins per year in 1836. As the population grew, new school buildings were constructed, including facilities in Villereuse in 1894 to accommodate over 1,000 students by the end of the 19th century.

=== 20th century and public spaces ===
One of the commune's important achievements for the entire Geneva community was the purchase of Parc des Eaux Vives. This property had belonged to the noble Plongeon family and passed through various hands before being acquired in 1865 by Louis Favre, known for building the Gotthard Tunnel. His daughter, Naoum Hava, sold it to the Société du Parc des Eaux-Vives for 600,000 francs. The estate briefly housed King Chulalongkorn of Siam and later became a Luna Park (amusement park).

Mayor John Gignoux led a committee to save the park and donate it to the Geneva community. In 1913, with contributions totaling 408,000 francs from public subscription, 280,000 francs from the Grand Council of Geneva, and 120,000 francs from the City of Geneva, the commune acquired the park for 1.5 million francs. The park was officially opened on 3 July 1913.

Adjacent to this park, Parc La Grange became public domain in 1918 when William Favre generously donated the property, which had belonged to the Lullin family since around 1720, to the City of Geneva.

=== Municipal merger ===
The question of merging suburban communes with the city first arose at the beginning of the 20th century. On 1 February 1901, the municipal council of Les Eaux-Vives unanimously opposed any fusion with Geneva. However, the issue resurfaced in 1926 due to the Canton's financial crisis.

On 18 May 1930, Geneva voters accepted the constitutional law of 22 March 1930, which provided for the merger of the communes of Les Eaux-Vives, Plainpalais, and Le Petit-Saconnex with Geneva. The commune of Les Eaux-Vives had opposed this merger by 1,256 votes against to 1,212 in favor. The merger took effect on 1 January 1931, ending 133 years of municipal independence.

== Mayors and municipal agents ==
The commune was administered by municipal agents from 1798 to 1800, followed by elected mayors from 1800 to 1931. Notable mayors included Jean-Édouard Naville (1809-1817), who initiated the commune's first proper meeting space, and John Gignoux (1904-1918), who oversaw the construction of the new town hall and the acquisition of Parc des Eaux-Vives. The last mayor was Camille Rochette, who served two terms (1918-1929 and 1930-1931).

== Demographics ==
The commune experienced remarkable population growth throughout its existence. From approximately 860 inhabitants in 1800, the population reached 2,000 in 1850, 11,872 in 1900, and 20,917 by 1930. This growth reflected the area's transformation from a rural fishing village to an urbanized suburb of Geneva.

== Bibliography ==
- C. Fontaine-Borgel, Histoire des communes genevoises de Vandœuvres, Collonge-Bellevue, Cologny et des Eaux-Vives, 1890
- L. Blondel, Les Faubourgs de Genève au XVe siècle, 1919
- J.-P. Ferrier, La commune des Eaux-Vives de sa création à la fusion, 1931
