= Göschenen riots =

1875 riots in Göschenen, Switzerland

- The workers' unrest near Göschenen at the St. Gotthard Tunnel (Illustrirte Zeitung, 1875)
- Date: 27th July 1875 - 28th July 1875
- Location: Göschenen, Uri, Switzerland
- Type: Workers led riots
- Cause: Precarious working conditions

The Göschenen unrest took place on the 27th and 28th of July 1875 in the Swiss municipality of Göschenen in the canton of Uri.

== The unrest ==
Construction works at the tunnel in Göschenen (Illustrirte Zeitung, 1875)

During the construction of the Gotthard tunnel the population of Göschenen increased by a few times, but the workers, who were working on the tunnel, were living in precarious conditions.

On the 27th of July the Italian tunnel workers began a strike and they demanded higher wages and in the process began an uproar in the village. The trigger for the unrest, that followed, was an argument between the post chief and the miners. They were refusing to continue with the digging for the tunnel, before the smoke from the explosions got cleared. Following that, there was an exchange of words, which lasted until the miners left the workplace in anger. On the way out a rumour was spread, that a dynamite box caught fire and that subsequently caused the crew to run outside.

When an issue occurred the usual response from the chief engineer Ernest von Stockalper was: "No one is forced to work in the tunnel", but this time those words turned up to be unhelpful to resolve the situation and prevent an escalation. The workers moved on to the village, where they made a stop in front of the post office, where the mayor, who used to be a postman as well, lived, and they let their anger out. There one of the workers, Luigi Dissune, under a wave of applause listed their demands: increase of their salary by one Frank, functioning ventilation system and safer working conditions. The miners threatened, that no one of them would work, until their conditions were met. That was reinforced by setting up posts in front of the tunnel portal. Some of the miners spent the night talking and singing. On the 28th of July at 6'o clock in the morning as well weren't let any miners in, only stonemasons and company workers.

== Intervention ==
The chief engineer Ernest von Stockalper demanded assistance from the mayor and sent a telegram to the construction office in Altdorf. The telegram stated the need for 50 armed men and 30 thousand Franks to be sent, in order to assist with the situation. At the same time the mayor, Karl Arnold, requested from the Uri administration reinforcements for the Göschenen militia, which then was commanded by a rural police officer. At 8 o'clock the Landammann and the Uri governor decided to send all of the rural police from Altdorf to Amsteg in order to offer support and weapons to Göschenen. The team was to be deployed along the road and the militia was led by policemen Sergeant Trösch. In Altdorf he quickly gathered seven men and drove with the rural police towards Göschenen, and in Wassen a further eight men were recruited. He arrived in Göschenen at 4 PM with 22 men. During the first advance to the post office the workers resisted, so Sergeant Trösch had to retreat. Only when the Göschen militia joined him he attempted to advance again. By this time there were already injuries among the law enforcement officers. The around thirty men looked "a little ridiculous in their hoods and military caps" and were outnumbered by the demonstrators, who were also throwing stones. It is unknown who fired the first shot and why and the exact order of events is unclear as well. The demonstrators subsequently dispersed. Amongst them four people died and several got injured.

After the strike followed from the 29th of July until 2nd of August an active service deployment of the cantonal infantry unit in Göschenen and later on an unarmed federal intervention under the leadership of a federal commissioner and Councillor, Colonel Hans Hold.

== Investigation ==
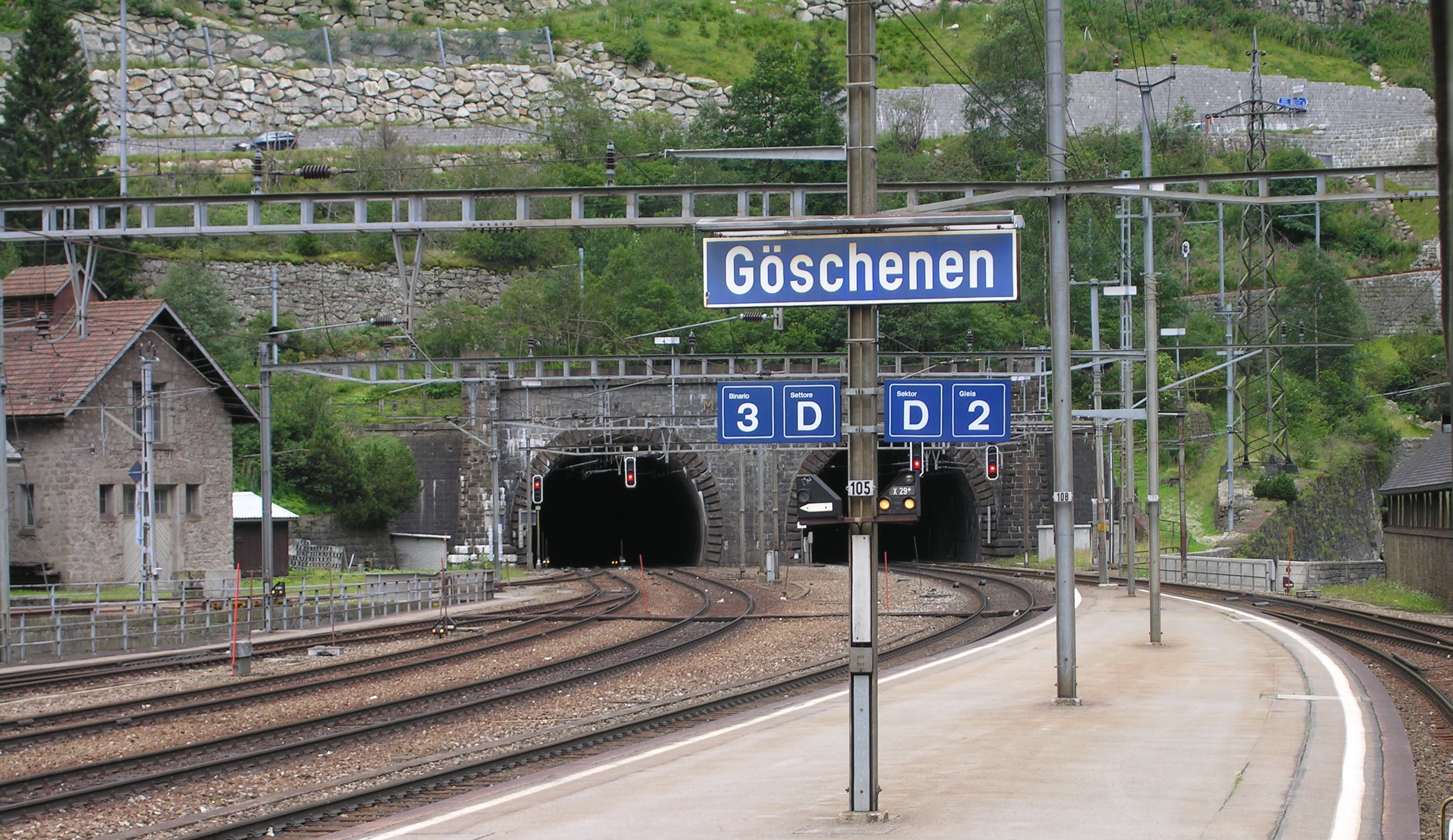
Entry to the Gotthard Tunnel at Göschenen

The investigation reports of the Uri canton, that were demanded by the Federal Council were deemed as insufficient, because only the criminal aspects of the strike were presented in it. Therefore, the Federal Council decided that there should be a new investigation, which would encompass three key points: the relationship between the workers and the company, the sanitary conditions, and the legitimacy of the police and military measures, undertaken by the Uri canton. Colonel Hans Hold was assigned to lead the investigation, beginning his assignment on the 23rd of September.

Councillor Hold then submitted two reports to the Federal Council, one of which would get published in the Swiss federal gazette. There Hold would describe in addition to the turn of events, the difficult living and working conditions of the guest workers:

Many workers, who make together Ménage, feed themselves at a sum of 60-80 Cts. daily, which considering the consuming tunnel work, after statements by the doctors, is completely inadequate and gives rise to multiple symptoms of illness.

— Hans Hold, Report from the 16th of October 1875

In a second unpublished report he criticized the lawlessness and sanitary conditions at the big construction site:

Almost at the same time a murdered worker would be found in Airolo by the tunnel entrance. The name of the person wasn't even determined, let alone a further investigation.

— Hans Hold, Report from the 27th of October 1875

The Swiss envoy Giovanni Battista Pioda in Rome reported on the 29th of December 1875, that the published report of Colonel Hold, which had previously announced demands for compensation for the bereaved and injured was deemed as satisfactory by the Italian government.

== Literature ==
- Bericht des eidg. Kommissärs Hrn. Hold über die Unruhen in Göschenen am 27. und 28. Juli 1875. BBl 1875 IV 621 ff.
- Untersuchung zu den Arbeiterunruhen von Göschenen. vertrauliches Schreiben von Hans Hold an das Justiz- und Polizeidepartement vom 27. Oktober 1875 (Handschrift). Schweizerisches Bundesarchiv, Bestand E 53/166.
- Tobias Kästli: Der Streik der Tunnelarbeiter am Gotthard 1875. Quellen und Kommentar. Z-Verlag, Basel 1977.
- Konrad Kuoni: Der Bau des Gotthard-Eisenbahntunnels (1872–1881). In: Ferrum, Nachrichten aus der Eisenbibliothek, Band 80 2008, S. 99–112.
- Alfred A. Häsler: Gotthard: Als die Technik Weltgeschichte schrieb. Huber, Frauenfeld 1982, ISBN 3-7193-0806-5, S. 163–172.
