= Chêne-Bourg =

- Municipality
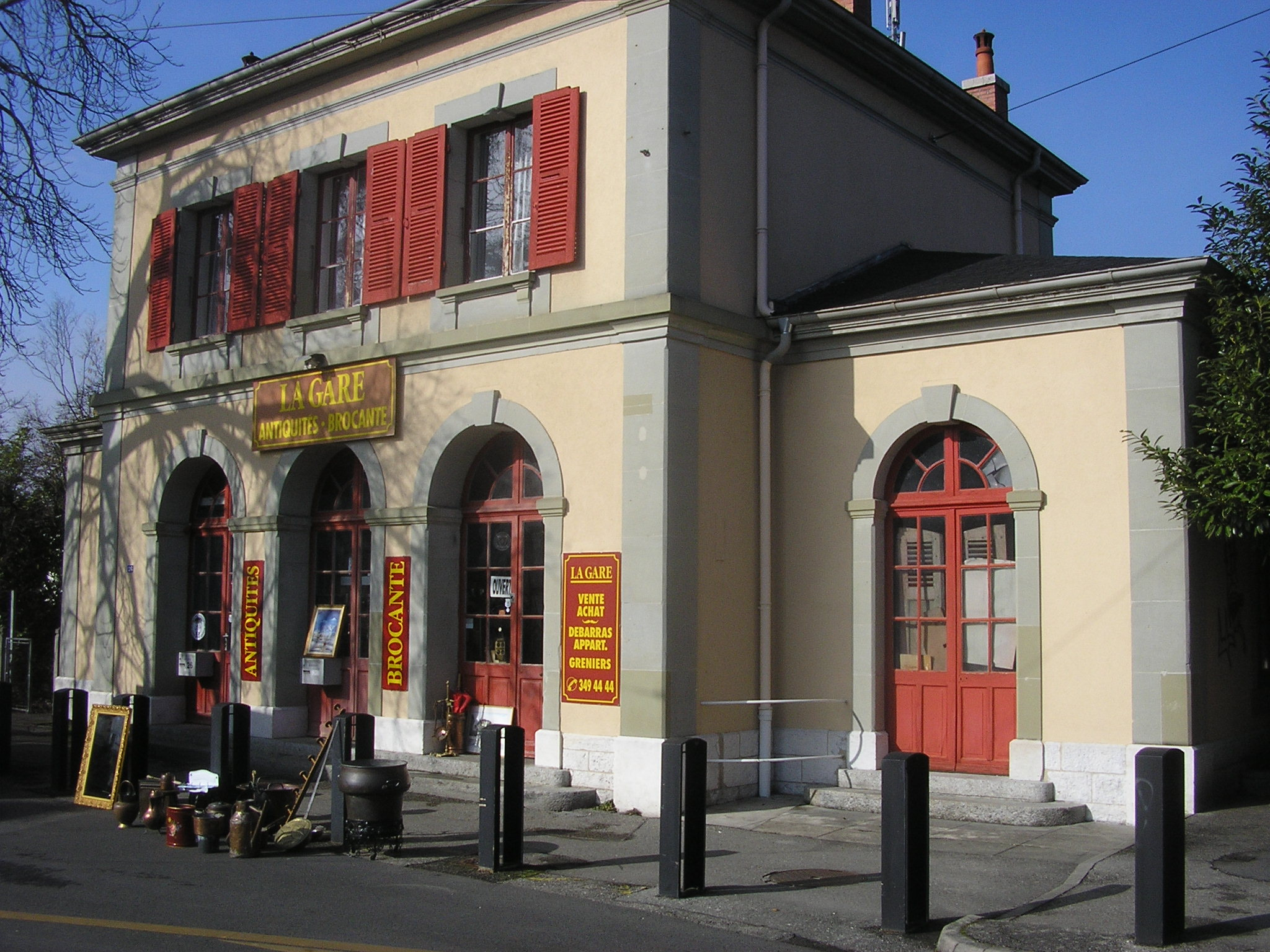

- Flag Coat of arms
- Location of Chêne-Bourg
- Location within Switzerland Location within Canton of Geneva
- Coordinates: 46°12′N 06°12′E
- Country: Switzerland
- Canton: Geneva
- District: n.a.

Government
  - Mayor: Maire; Philippe Moser

Area
  - Total: 1.28 km^{2} (0.49 sq mi)
- Elevation: 426 m (1,398 ft)

Population (December 2020)
  - Total: 8,791
  - Density: 6,870/km^{2} (17,800/sq mi)
- Time zone: UTC+01:00 (CET)
  - Summer (DST): UTC+02:00 (CEST)
- Postal code: 1225
- SFOS number: 6613
- ISO 3166 code: CH-GE
- Surrounded by: Chêne-Bougeries, Thônex, Vandœuvres
- Website: www.chene-bourg.ch

Chêne-Bourg is a municipality in the canton of Geneva, Switzerland.

== History ==
Chêne-Bourg is first mentioned in 1270 as Quercus. In 1869 it became an independent municipality when Chêne-Thônex divided into the municipalities of Chêne-Bourg and Thônex.

== Geography ==
Chêne-Bourg has an area, as of 2009, of 1.28 square kilometers (0.49 sq mi). Of this area, 0.11 km^{2} (0.042 sq mi) or 8.6% is used for agricultural purposes, while 0.04 km^{2} (0.015 sq mi) or 3.1% is forested. Of the rest of the land, 1.12 km^{2} (0.43 sq mi) or 87.5% is settled (buildings or roads).

Aerial view (1968)

Of the built up area, industrial buildings made up 3.1% of the total area while housing and buildings made up 59.4% and transportation infrastructure made up 15.6%. while parks, green belts and sports fields made up 8.6%. Out of the forested land, 1.6% of the total land area is heavily forested and 1.6% is covered with orchards or small clusters of trees. Of the agricultural land, 7.0% is used for growing crops.

The municipality is located on the left bank of Lake Geneva and the Seymaz river. It is partly surrounded by the municipality of Thônex. Outside of the historic core, the municipality is densely populated, with a number of villas and small multi-family buildings.

The municipality of Chêne-Bourg consists of the sub-sections or villages of Vieux-Bourg, Petit-Senn - Floraire, Chêne-Bourg - centre, Plateau de Bel-Air and Petit-Bel-Air.

== Demographics ==
Largest groups of foreign residents 2013
Nationality	Amount	% total (population)
Portugal	822	10.1
France	416	5.1
Italy	396	4.9
Spain	193	2.4
Kosovo	90	1.1
Germany	74	0.9
Brazil	74	0.9
UK	70	0.9
Turkey	48	0.6
Tunisia	41	0.5
Congo-Kinshasa	38	0.5
Serbia	35	0.4
Russia	33	0.4
Colombia	29	0.3
Netherlands	25	0.3

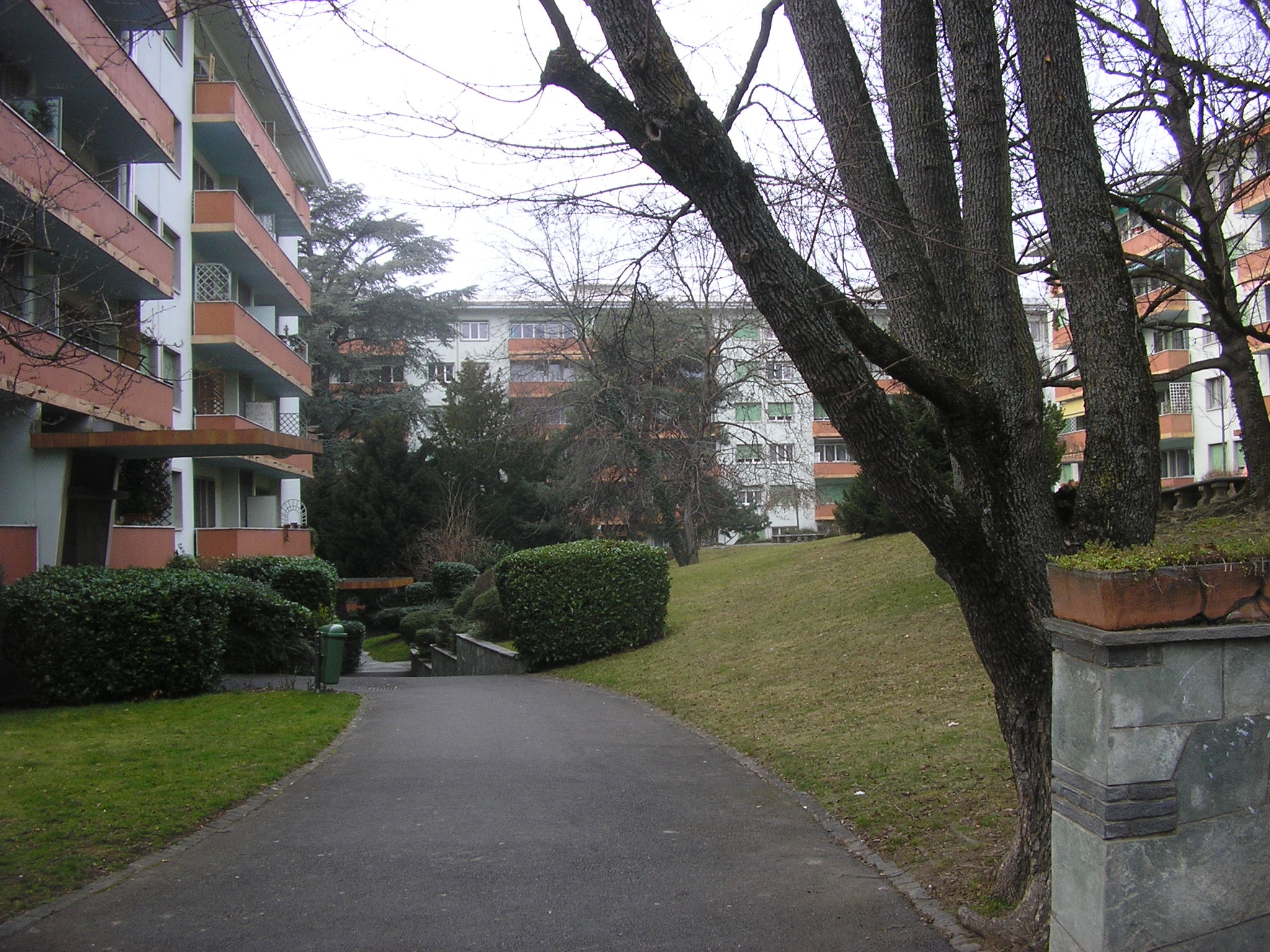
Apartment buildings in Chêne-Bourg

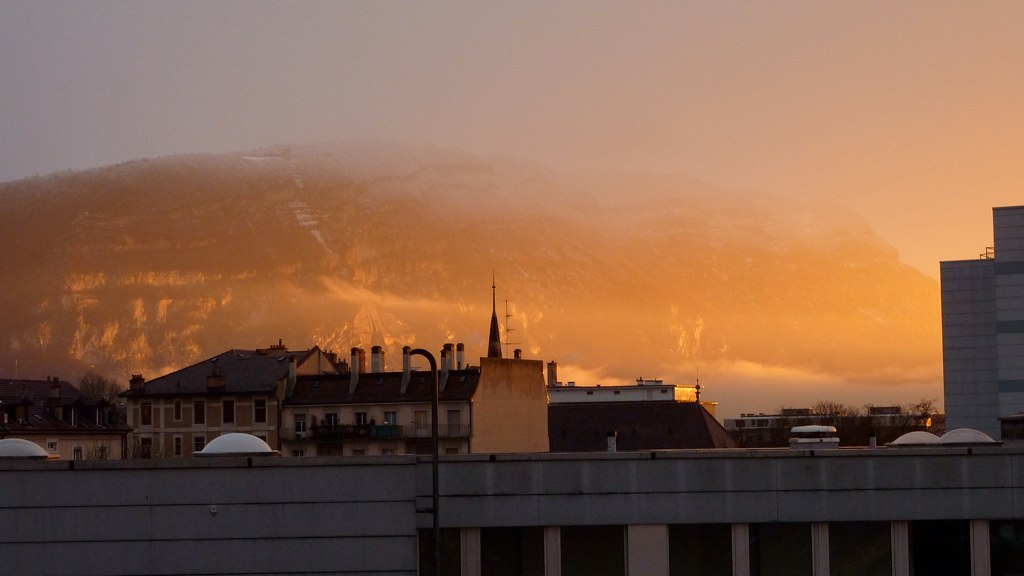
View over Chêne-Bourg, looking toward the mountains to the south in France

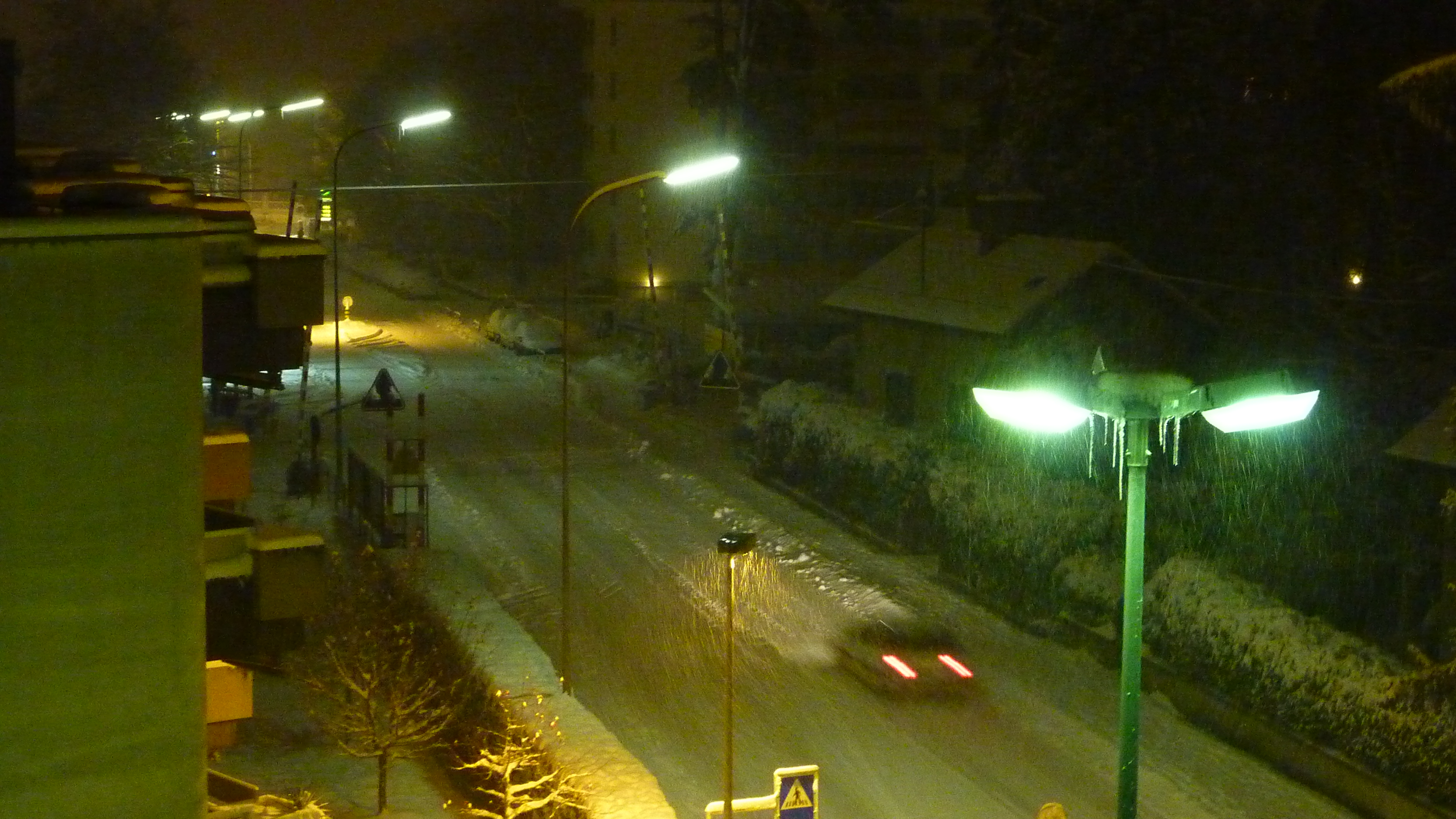
Streets in Chêne-Bourg

Chêne-Bourg has a population (as of December 2020) of 8,791. As of 2008, 34.6% of the population are resident foreign nationals. Over the last 10 years (1999–2009 ) the population has changed at a rate of 15.4%. It has changed at a rate of 9.6% due to migration and at a rate of 5.9% due to births and deaths.

Most of the population (as of 2000) speaks French (5,781 or 80.1%), with Portuguese being second most common (348 or 4.8%) and Italian being third (262 or 3.6%). There are 6 people who speak Romansh.

As of 2008, the gender distribution of the population was 47.1% male and 52.9% female. The population was made up of 2,346 Swiss men (29.2% of the population) and 1,446 (18.0%) non-Swiss men. There were 2,879 Swiss women (35.8%) and 1,372 (17.1%) non-Swiss women. Of the population in the municipality 1,101 or about 15.2% were born in Chêne-Bourg and lived there in 2000. There were 1,836 or 25.4% who were born in the same canton, while 1,080 or 15.0% were born somewhere else in Switzerland, and 2,819 or 39.0% were born outside of Switzerland.

In 2008 there were 57 live births to Swiss citizens and 24 births to non-Swiss citizens, and in same time span there were 26 deaths of Swiss citizens and 3 non-Swiss citizen deaths. Ignoring immigration and emigration, the population of Swiss citizens increased by 31 while the foreign population increased by 21. There were 28 Swiss men and 28 Swiss women who emigrated from Switzerland. At the same time, there were 41 non-Swiss men and 52 non-Swiss women who immigrated from another country to Switzerland. The total Swiss population change in 2008 (from all sources, including moves across municipal borders) was an increase of 43 and the non-Swiss population increased by 21 people. This represents a population growth rate of 0.8%.

The age distribution of the population (as of 2000) is children and teenagers (0–19 years old) make up 23.3% of the population, while adults (20–64 years old) make up 63.3% and seniors (over 64 years old) make up 13.3%.

As of 2000, there were 3,026 people who were single and never married in the municipality. There were 3,213 married individuals, 378 widows or widowers and 604 individuals who are divorced.

As of 2000, there were 3,248 private households in the municipality, and an average of 2.1 persons per household. There were 1,290 households that consist of only one person and 148 households with five or more people. Out of a total of 3,351 households that answered this question, 38.5% were households made up of just one person and there were 19 adults who lived with their parents. Of the rest of the households, there are 741 married couples without children, 849 married couples with children There were 297 single parents with a child or children. There were 52 households that were made up of unrelated people and 103 households that were made up of some sort of institution or another collective housing.

In 2000 there were 342 single family homes (or 47.0% of the total) out of a total of 728 inhabited buildings. There were 220 multi-family buildings (30.2%), along with 125 multi-purpose buildings that were mostly used for housing (17.2%) and 41 other use buildings (commercial or industrial) that also had some housing (5.6%). Of the single family homes 58 were built before 1919, while 37 were built between 1990 and 2000. The greatest number of single family homes (79) were built between 1919 and 1945.

In 2000 there were 3,524 apartments in the municipality. The most common apartment size was 3 rooms of which there were 1,097. There were 407 single room apartments and 447 apartments with five or more rooms. Of these apartments, a total of 3,191 apartments (90.6% of the total) were permanently occupied, while 266 apartments (7.5%) were seasonally occupied and 67 apartments (1.9%) were empty. As of 2009, the construction rate of new housing units was 6.5 new units per 1000 residents. The vacancy rate for the municipality, in 2010, was 0.16%.

The historical population is given in the following chart:

== Notable residents ==
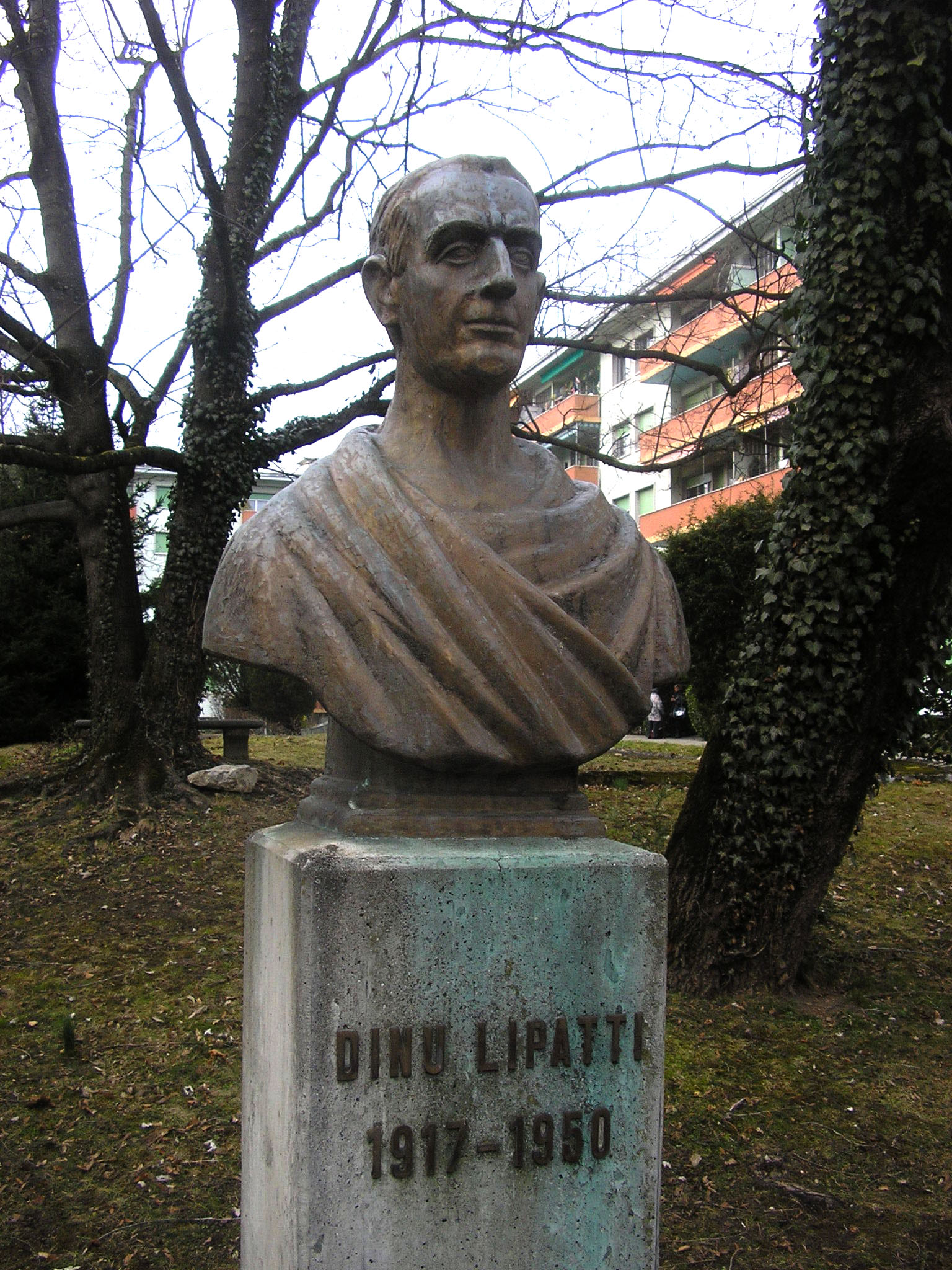
Bust of Dinu Lipatti

Louis Favre was born in Chêne-Bourg.

The pianist Dinu Lipatti is buried in the cemetery of Chêne-Bourg next to his wife Madeleine.

== Politics ==
In the 2007 federal election the most popular party was the SP which received 20.11% of the vote. The next three most popular parties were the SVP (18.73%), the Green Party (17.17%) and the LPS Party (16.62%). In the federal election, a total of 1,807 votes were cast, and the voter turnout was 45.2%.

In the 2009 Grand Conseil election, there were a total of 4,065 registered voters of which 1,525 (37.5%) voted. The most popular party in the municipality for this election was the MCG with 17.0% of the ballots. In the canton-wide election they received the third highest proportion of votes. The second most popular party was the Les Verts (with 15.6%), they were also second in the canton-wide election, while the third most popular party was the Les Socialistes (with 13.8%), they were fourth in the canton-wide election.

For the 2009 Conseil d'Etat election, there were a total of 4,080 registered voters of which 1,788 (43.8%) voted.

In 2011, all the municipalities held local elections, and in Chêne-Bourg there were 23 spots open on the municipal council. There were a total of 5,621 registered voters of which 2,093 (37.2%) voted. Out of the 2,093 votes, there were 13 blank votes, 23 null or unreadable votes and 192 votes with a name that was not on the list.

== Economy ==
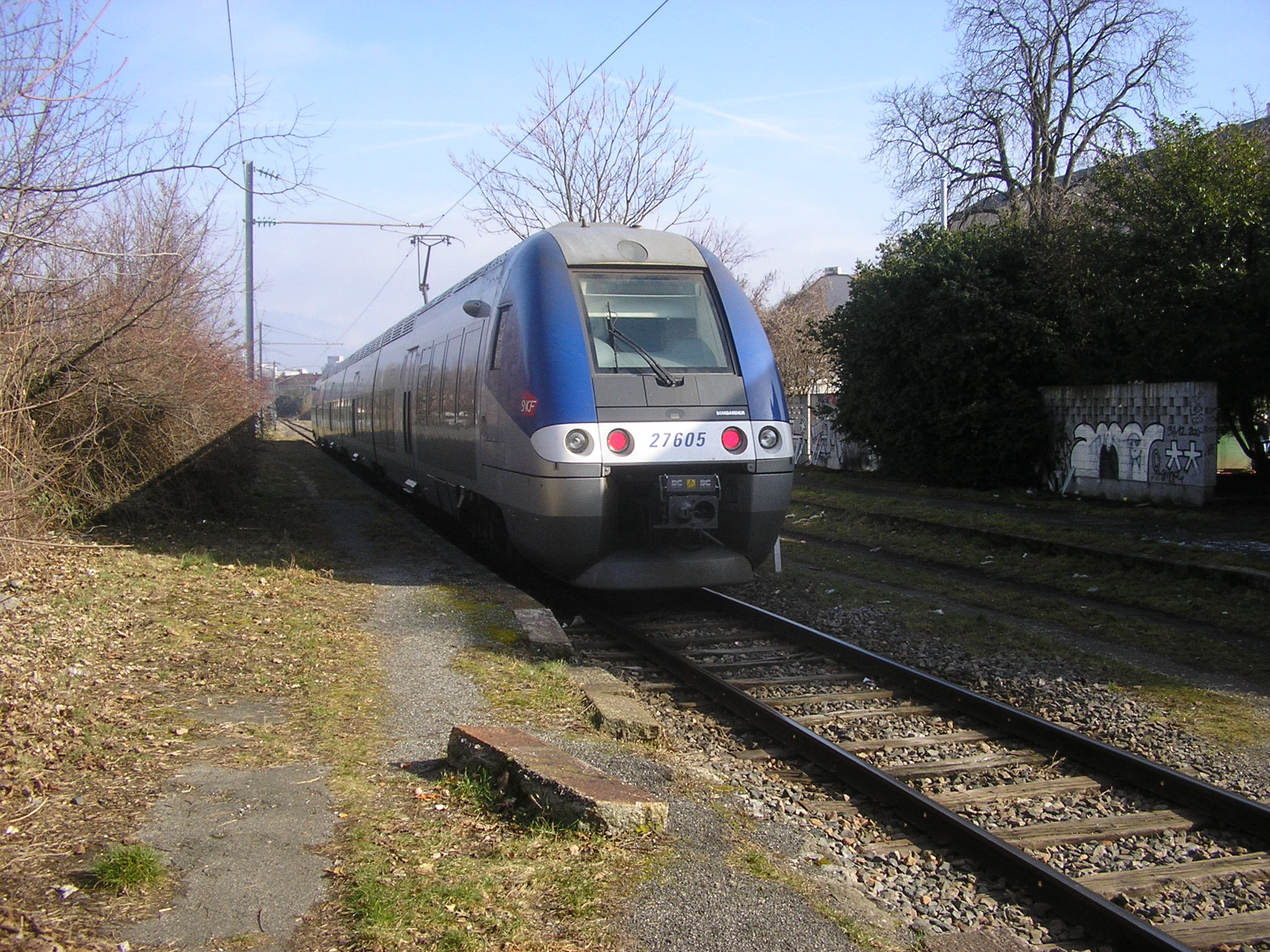
Modern trains connect Chêne-Bourg to Geneva and other destinations

The workshop of watchmaker Frédérique Constant can be found in Chêne-Bourg.

As of 2010, Chêne-Bourg had an unemployment rate of 7.4%. As of 2008, there were 2 people employed in the primary economic sector and about 1 business involved in this sector. 1,032 people were employed in the secondary sector and there were 83 businesses in this sector. 1,776 people were employed in the tertiary sector, with 320 businesses in this sector. There were 3,606 residents of the municipality who were employed in some capacity, of which females made up 48.2% of the workforce.

In 2008 the total number of full-time equivalent jobs was 2,504. The number of jobs in the primary sector was 1, all of which were in agriculture. The number of jobs in the secondary sector was 1,003 of which 768 or (76.6%) were in manufacturing and 234 (23.3%) were in construction. The number of jobs in the tertiary sector was 1,500. In the tertiary sector; 439 or 29.3% were in wholesale or retail sales or the repair of motor vehicles, 66 or 4.4% were in the movement and storage of goods, 108 or 7.2% were in a hotel or restaurant, 142 or 9.5% were in the information industry, 68 or 4.5% were the insurance or financial industry, 170 or 11.3% were technical professionals or scientists, 90 or 6.0% were in education and 181 or 12.1% were in health care.

In 2000, there were 3,332 workers who commuted into the municipality and 2,990 workers who commuted away. The municipality is a net importer of workers, with about 1.1 workers entering the municipality for every one leaving. About 21.2% of the workforce coming into Chêne-Bourg are coming from outside Switzerland, while 0.0% of the locals commute out of Switzerland for work. Of the working population, 36% used public transportation to get to work, and 41.3% used a private car.

== Religion ==
From the 2000 census, 3,111 or 43.1% were Roman Catholic, while 1,053 or 14.6% belonged to the Swiss Reformed Church. Of the rest of the population, there were 107 members of an Orthodox church (or about 1.48% of the population), there were 6 individuals (or about 0.08% of the population) who belonged to the Christian Catholic Church, and there were 125 individuals (or about 1.73% of the population) who belonged to another Christian church. There were 35 individuals (or about 0.48% of the population) who were Jewish, and 266 (or about 3.68% of the population) who were Islamic. There were 16 individuals who were Buddhist, 6 individuals who were Hindu and 16 individuals who belonged to another church. 1,741 (or about 24.11% of the population) belonged to no church, are agnostic or atheist, and 739 individuals (or about 10.23% of the population) did not answer the question.

== Education ==
In Chêne-Bourg about 2,103 or (29.1%) of the population have completed non-mandatory upper secondary education, and 1,247 or (17.3%) have completed additional higher education (either university or a Fachhochschule). Of the 1,247 who completed tertiary schooling, 34.2% were Swiss men, 36.2% were Swiss women, 16.0% were non-Swiss men and 13.6% were non-Swiss women.

During the 2009-2010 school year there were a total of 1,667 students in the Chêne-Bourg school system. The education system in the Canton of Geneva allows young children to attend two years of non-obligatory Kindergarten. During that school year, there were 131 children who were in a pre-kindergarten class. The canton's school system provides two years of non-mandatory kindergarten and requires students to attend six years of primary school, with some of the children attending smaller, specialized classes. In Chêne-Bourg there were 299 students in kindergarten or primary school and 34 students were in the special, smaller classes. The secondary school program consists of three lower, obligatory years of schooling, followed by three to five years of optional, advanced schools. There were 299 lower secondary students who attended school in Chêne-Bourg. There were 382 upper secondary students from the municipality along with 74 students who were in a professional, non-university track program. An additional 95 students attended a private school.

As of 2000, there were 76 students in Chêne-Bourg who came from another municipality, while 709 residents attended schools outside the municipality.

== Transportation ==
The municipality has a railway station, Chêne-Bourg, on the CEVA orbital railway. The station has frequent service from the Léman Express.
