= Chêne-Bourg railway station =

Railway station in Chêne-Bourg, Switzerland

Chêne-Bourg
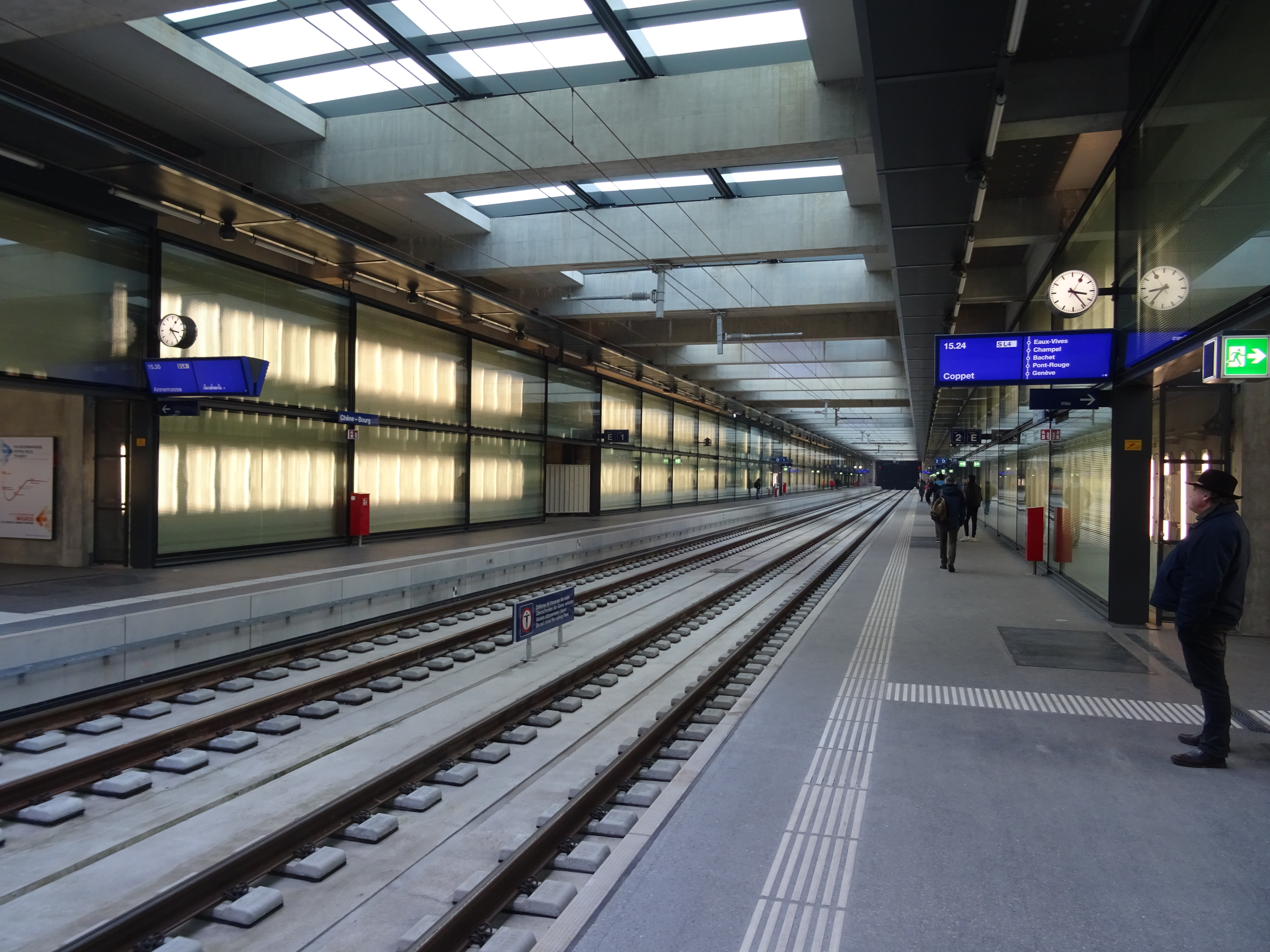
- The station platforms in 2020

General information
- Location: Chêne-Bourg; Switzerland
- Coordinates: 46°11′48″N 6°11′50″E
- Elevation: 414 m (1,358 ft)
- Owner: Swiss Federal Railways
- Lines: CEVA; Annemasse-Genève-Eaux-Vives line (until 2013)
- Distance: 73.1 km (45.4 mi) from Lausanne
- Platforms: 2 side platforms
- Tracks: 2
- Train operators: Swiss Federal Railways
- Connections: tpg : gare-Place, gare-Tour, Place Favre
- Tram: Tram lines and
- Bus: bus lines

Construction
- Parking: Yes (499 spaces)
- Cycle facilities: Yes (296 spaces)
- Accessible: Yes

Other information
- Station code: 8516274 (CHEB)
- Fare zone: 10 (unireso)

History
- Opened: 15 December 2019

Passengers
- 2023: 5'700 per weekday (SBB)

Services
Preceding station	SBB CFF FFS	Following station
Genève-Eaux-Vives towards St-Maurice or Martigny	RE33	Annemasse Terminus
Preceding station	Léman Express	Following station
Genève-Eaux-Vives towards Coppet	L1	Annemasse towards Évian-les-Bains
Genève-Eaux-Vives towards Coppet	L2	Annemasse towards Annecy
Genève-Eaux-Vives towards Coppet	L3	Annemasse towards Saint-Gervais
Genève-Eaux-Vives towards Coppet	L4	Annemasse Terminus
Genève-Eaux-Vives towards Geneva Airport, Vernier or Lancy-Pont-Rouge	L7	Annemasse Terminus
Location
- Location within Switzerland Location within Canton of Geneva

Chêne-Bourg railway station (French: Gare de Chêne-Bourg) is a railway station in the municipality of Chêne-Bourg, in the Swiss canton of Geneva. It is an intermediate stop on the standard gauge CEVA orbital railway line of Swiss Federal Railways.

== History ==
The original station opened on 27 May 1888, on the Annemasse-Genève-Eaux-Vives line between Genève-Eaux-Vives and Annemasse. The station closed in 1987 in favor of the newly opened station at Ambilly; this was done so that customs control could be centralized at Genève-Eaux-Vives. The station building was preserved, and re-opened from 2011–2013 to handle TER services after construction on the new CEVA orbital railway line led to the closure of Genève-Eaux-Vives.

As part of the CEVA project, a new underground station was built at Chêne-Bourg; the original station building was moved about 40 metres (130 ft) but remains standing. The new station opened on 15 December 2019.

== Services ==
As of the December 2024 timetable change, the following services stop at Chêne-Bourg:

- RegioExpress: half-hourly service (hourly on weekends) between Annemasse and St-Maurice, and hourly service from St-Maurice to Martigny (only on weekdays).
- Léman Express:
  - L1 / L2 / L3 / L4: service every fifteen minutes between Coppet and Annemasse; from Annemasse every hour to Annecy, half-hourly or hourly service or service every two hours to Évian-les-Bains and every two hours to Saint-Gervais-les-Bains-Le Fayet.
  - L7: additional services to Annemasse and to Geneva Airport, Vernier or Lancy-Pont-Rouge
