= Herzstück Basel =

Railway tunnel in Basel, Switzerland

Overview
- Status: Planned
- Locale: Basel, Switzerland
- Stations: 2

Service
- Type: Commuter rail
- System: Basel trinational S-Bahn
- Operator(s): Swiss Federal Railways

Technical
- Line length: 4 km (2.5 mi)
- Track gauge: 1,435 mm (4 ft 8 1/2 in) standard gauge

Herzstück Basel is a planned underground rail tunnel through the Swiss city of Basel.

== Background ==
Planned since the 1980s, Herzstück Basel would provide a more direct connection between Basel Badischer Bahnhof and Basel SBB via two new underground stations, "Basel Mitte" and "Basel Klybeck". Currently, trains between the two stations take a meandering route through the city. In 2019, the cost of the project was estimated to be 3.2 billion Swiss francs. The cantons of Basel-Stadt and Basel-Landschaft have provided 30 million Swiss francs to fund a study into the proposal.

== See also ==
- CEVA rail - a similar cross-border underground rail link built between Geneva and Annemasse
