= Louis Favre (engineer) =

Swiss engineer

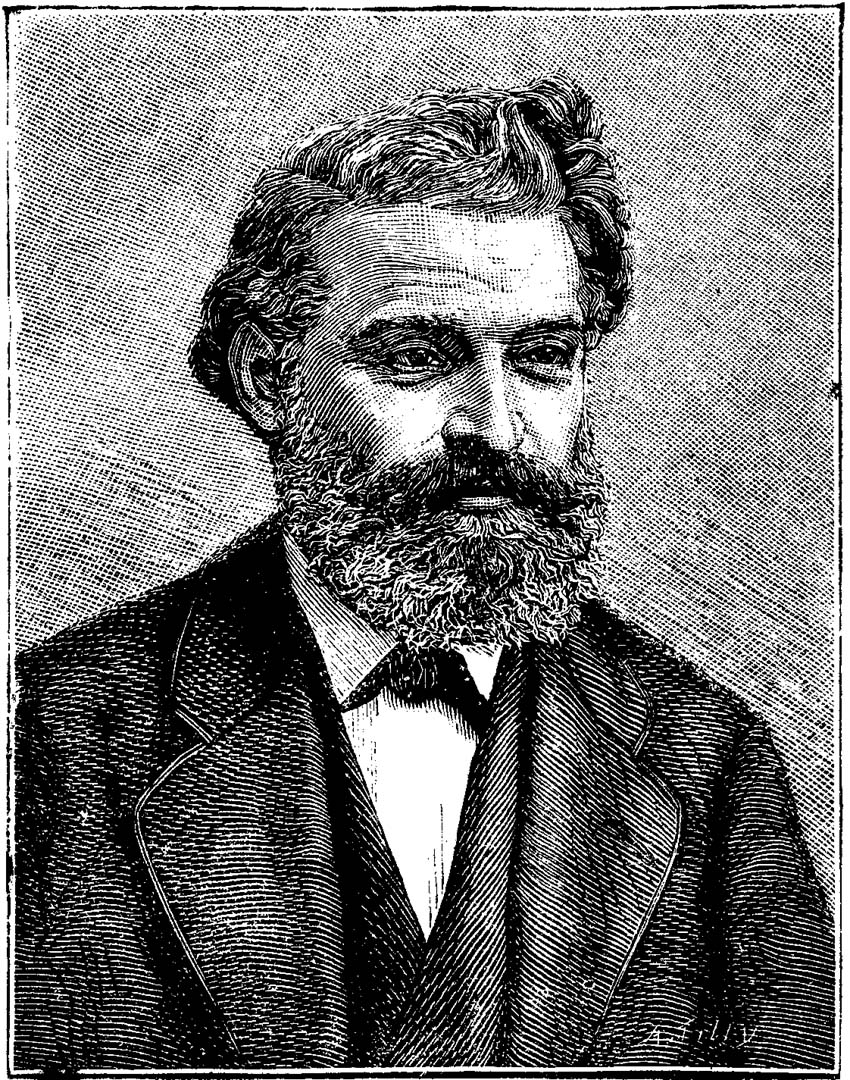
- Favre around 1860
- Born: Louis Favre; 28 January 1826; Chêne-Bourg, Switzerland
- Died: 19 July 1879 (aged 53); Göschenen, Switzerland
- Occupations: Businessman; Engineer
- Spouse: Caroline Eugénie Rondeau (m. 1846)

Louis Favre (26 January 1826 – 19 July 1879) was a Swiss businessman and self-taught engineer who is primarily notable for the construction of the Gotthard Rail Tunnel between 1872 and his death in the tunnel in 1879.

== Early life and education ==
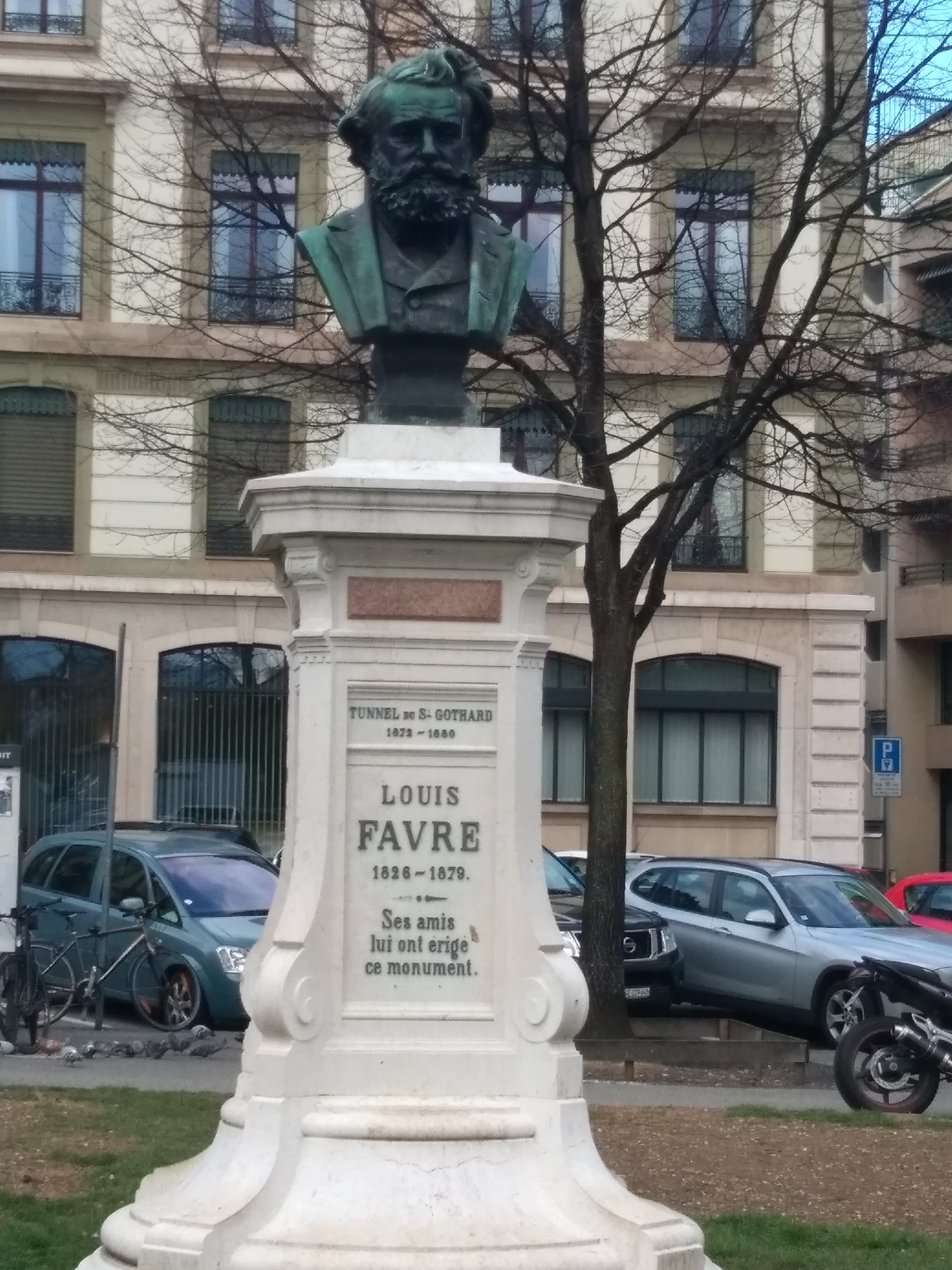
Louis Favre monument in Geneva

Favre was born 26 January 1826 in Chêne-Bourg, Switzerland (today within Geneva) to Claude and Péronne (née Chevalier). His father operated a small carpenter workshop where Favre also completed his apprenticeship. From March 1846 he also engaged in carpentry work in Neuilly-sur-Seine, Kingdom of France and self-taught himself to be an engineer.

== Career ==
At eighteen, he left to tour France and developed a career undertaking the design and direction of civil engineering works. He was not well schooled, but studied the principal bases of such sciences as were to be useful to him, and took evening classes to make up for what was lacking in his early instruction; not that he hoped to make a complete study for an engineer, but only to learn the indispensable. He was, according to a colleague "before all things, a practical man, who made up for the enforced insufficiency of his technical knowledge by a coup d'œil (glance) of surprising accuracy".

In 1872 he was invited to build a tunnel through the Gotthard massif, connecting the Canton of Ticino (South) with the rest of Switzerland (North). The project was, for the time, a vast undertaking, verging on folly according to many critics. Construction of the tunnel was accompanied by very considerable loss of life and escalation of cost, arising out of the novelty of the endeavour and the most insurmountable difficulties which presented themselves. Favre bore the brunt of continued criticism, including that deflected on to him by the board of the St. Gothard Company. In spite of this, the cost of the tunnel per running foot was a third less than that of the great Mont Cenis Tunnel.

A contemporary account of his death was written by the general secretary of the company, Maxime Helene, based on the account of M. Stockalper, the engineer in chief of the Göschenen section of the tunnel, who accompanied Favre on his fatal subterranean excursion:

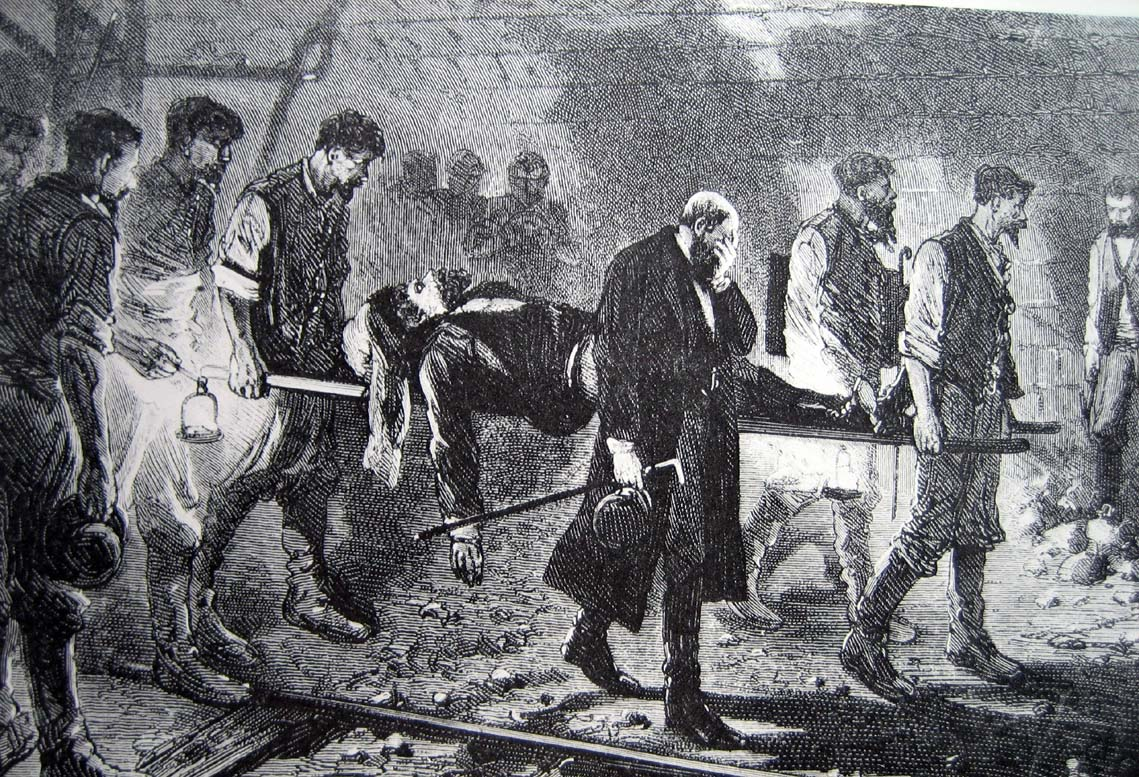
Death of Louis Favre

For months before it must be said Favre had been growing old. The man of broad shoulders and with head covered with thick hair in which here and there a few silver threads showed themselves, and who was as straight as at the age of twenty years, had begun to stoop, his hair had whitened and his face had assumed an expression of sadness that it was difficult for him to conceal. As powerful as it was this character had been subjugated. The transformation had not escaped me. Often during the days that we passed together he complained of a dizziness that became more and more frequent. We all saw him rapidly growing old. On the 19th of July, 1879, he had entered the tunnel with one of his friends, a French engineer who had come to visit the work, accompanied by M. Stockalper. Up to the end of the adit he had complained of nothing, but, according to his habit, went along examining the timbers, stopping at different points to give instructions, and making now and then a sally at his friend, who was unused to the smell of dynamite. In returning he began to complain of internal pains. "My dear Stockalper," said he, "take my lamp, I will join you." At the end of ten minutes not seeing him return, M. Stockalper exclaimed, "Well! M. Favre, are you coming?" No answer. The visitor and engineer retraced their steps, and when they reached Favre he was leaning against the rocks with his head resting upon his breast. His heart had already ceased to beat. A train loaded with excavated rock was passing and on this was laid the already stiff body of him who had struggled up to his last breath to execute a work all science and labor. A glorious end, if ever there was one!
