= Göschenen =

- Municipality
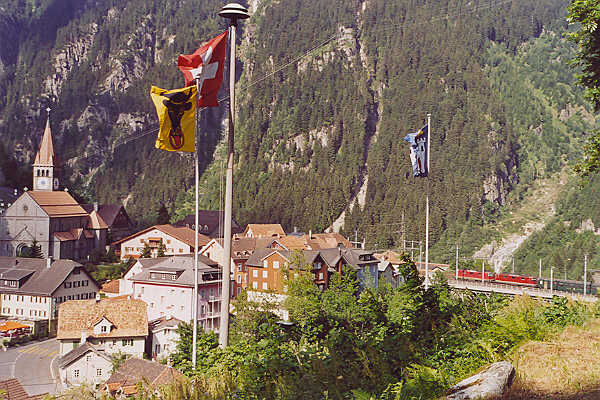

- Flag Coat of arms
- Location of Göschenen
- Location within Switzerland Location within Canton of Uri
- Coordinates: 46°40′N 8°35′E
- Country: Switzerland
- Canton: Uri
- District: n.a.

Area
  - Total: 104.31 km^{2} (40.27 sq mi)
- Elevation: 1,111 m (3,645 ft)

Population (December 2020)
  - Total: 428
  - Density: 4.10/km^{2} (10.6/sq mi)
- Time zone: UTC+01:00 (CET)
  - Summer (DST): UTC+02:00 (CEST)
- Postal code: 6487
- SFOS number: 1208
- ISO 3166 code: CH-UR
- Surrounded by: Andermatt, Gadmen (BE), Gurtnellen, Hospental, Oberwald (VS), Realp, Wassen
- Website: www.goeschenen.ch

Göschenen (Italian: Casinotta, Romansh: Caschanuttais) is a village and municipality in the canton of Uri in Switzerland. It sits at the northern end of the Gotthard tunnel. The Göschenen riots (1875) saw Urner troops opening fire on Italian miners demonstrating for better working conditions and wages on the tunnel's construction site.

== Name ==
Göschenen is first mentioned in 1280 as Gesschenden. The name is from Rumantsch *cascina (modern caschigna) "alpine hut", from Latin capsum "corral", but influenced by the word for cheese, cascio. The e in the first syllable is due to Germanic i-umlaut, changed to ö in modern spelling is a hypercorrection based on the phonology of the dialect of Uri.

== Geography ==
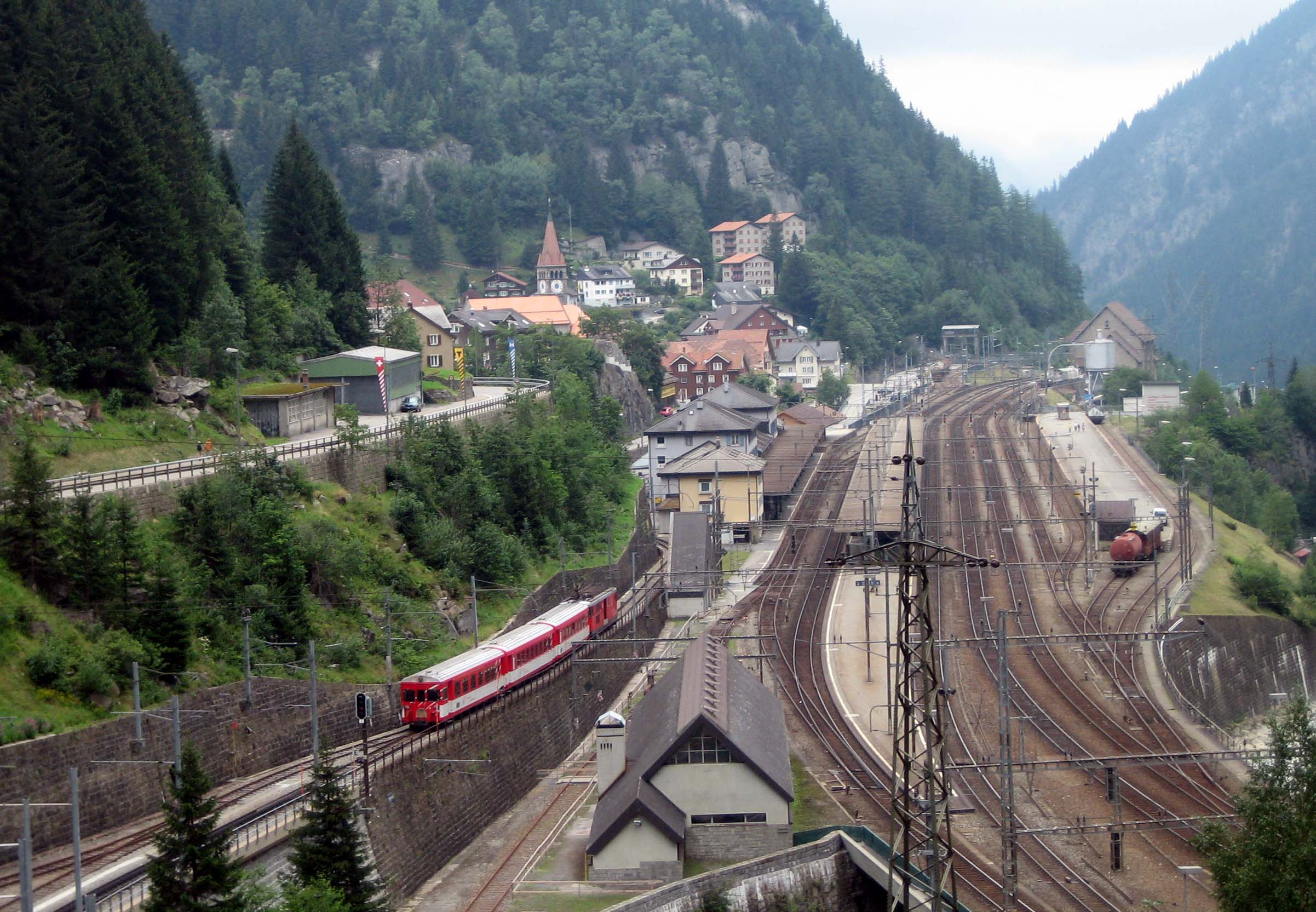
Göschenen railway station right above the entrance to the Gotthard Tunnel

Aerial view (1963)

Göschenen has an area, as of 2006, of 104.1 km^{2} (40.2 sq mi). Of this area, 7.3% is used for agricultural purposes, while 11.4% is forested. Of the rest of the land, 0.9% is settled (buildings or roads) and the remainder (80.4%) is non-productive (rivers, glaciers or mountains). In the 1993/97 land survey, 5.1% of the total land area was heavily forested, while 5.5% is covered in small trees and shrubbery. Of the agricultural land, 0.0% is used for farming or pastures, while 0.7% is used for orchards or vine crops and 6.6% is used for alpine pastures. Of the settled areas, 0.1% is covered with buildings, 0.3% is classed as special developments, and 0.5% is transportation infrastructure. Of the unproductive areas, 1.3% is unproductive standing water (ponds or lakes), 0.9% is unproductive flowing water (rivers), 62.8% is too rocky for vegetation, and 15.4% is other unproductive land.

Göschenen and its railway station are located at the northern end of the Gotthard Road Tunnel and the Gotthard Rail Tunnel. The village grew up around a bridge over the Reuss. The Schöllenen Gorge in the Reuss Valley between Andermatt and Göschenen is the location of the infamous Devil's Bridge. A very short 1,000 mm (3 ft 3 3/8 in) metre gauge railway line, the Schöllenenbahn, connects Göschenen railway station with Andermatt railway station, via the Schöllenen Gorge.

Until 1875 it was part of the municipality of Wassen. It consists of the village of Göschenen and the hamlets of Abfrutt and the Göscheneralp.

== Demographics ==
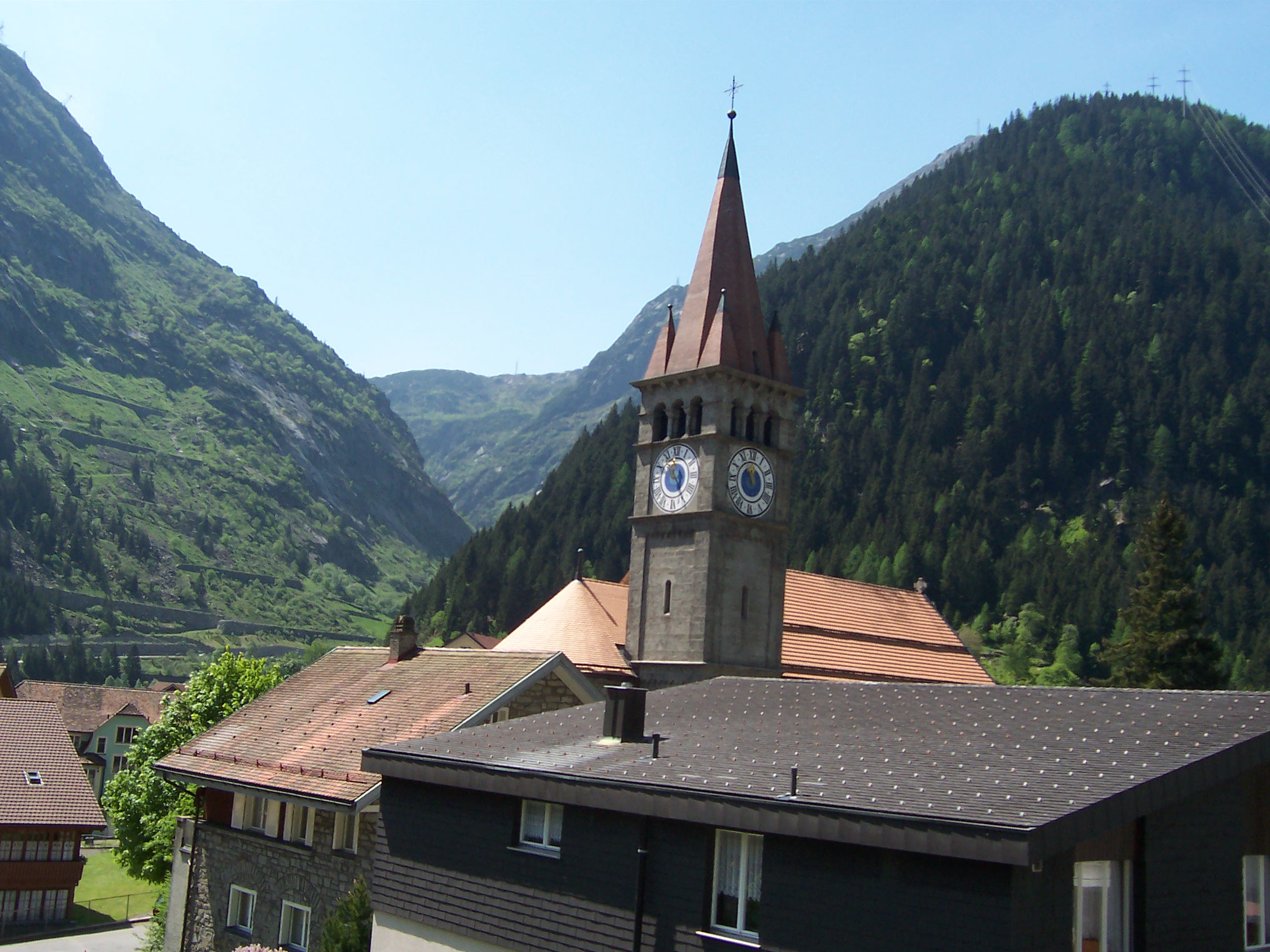
Goschenen church

Göschenen has a population (as of 31 December 2020) of 428. As of 2007, 4.2% of the population was made up of foreign nationals. Over the last 10 years the population has decreased at a rate of -26.9%. Most of the population (as of 2000) speaks German (94.9%), with Portuguese being second most common ( 2.0%) and Spanish being third ( 1.2%). As of 2007 the gender distribution of the population was 49.3% male and 50.7% female.

In the 2007 federal election the FDP party received 90.4% of the vote.

The entire Swiss population is generally well educated. In Göschenen about 58.4% of the population (between age 25-64) have completed either non-mandatory upper secondary education or additional higher education (either university or a Fachhochschule).

Göschenen has an unemployment rate of 0.81%. As of 2005, there were 34 people employed in the primary economic sector and about 10 businesses involved in this sector. 75 people are employed in the secondary sector and there are 4 businesses in this sector. 96 people are employed in the tertiary sector, with 17 businesses in this sector.

The historical population is given in the following table:

year	population
1837	344
1850	348
1880	2,992^{a}
1900	773
1920	974
1950	698
1960	1,284
1970	888
2000	511
2005	473
2007	450
2010	410

^a Population increase due to construction of the Gotthard rail tunnel.

== Weather ==
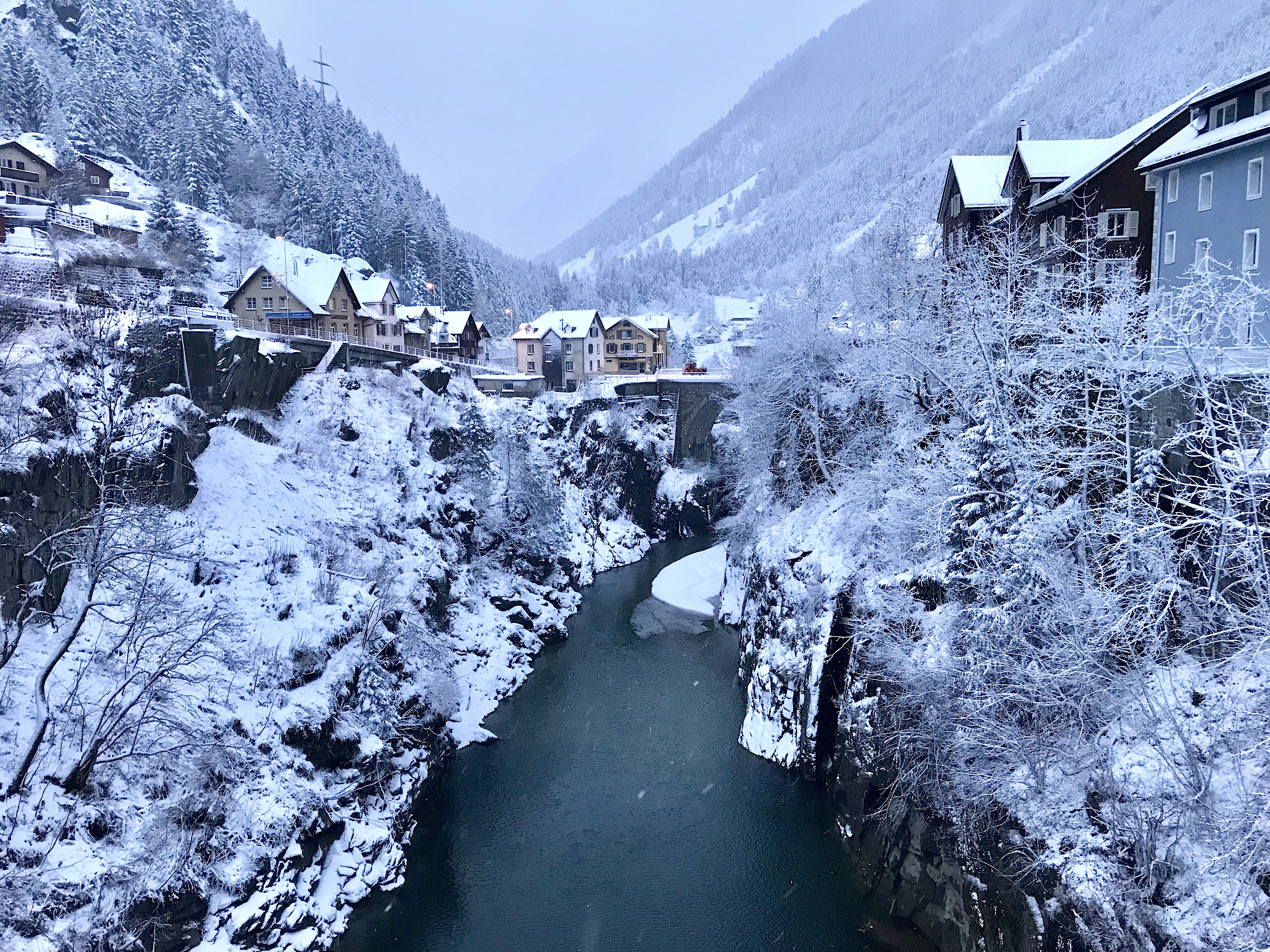
Göschenen in winter

Göschenen has an average of 151.4 days of rain per year and on average receives 1,424 mm (56.1 in) of precipitation. The wettest month is April during which time Göschenen receives an average of 139 mm (5.5 in) of precipitation. During this month there is precipitation for an average of 14.2 days. The month with the most days of precipitation is May, with an average of 15.3, but with only 139 mm (5.5 in) of precipitation. The driest month of the year is September with an average of 102 mm (4.0 in) of precipitation over 14.2 days.
