= Genève-Eaux-Vives railway station =

Railway station in Geneva, Switzerland

Genève-Eaux-Vives
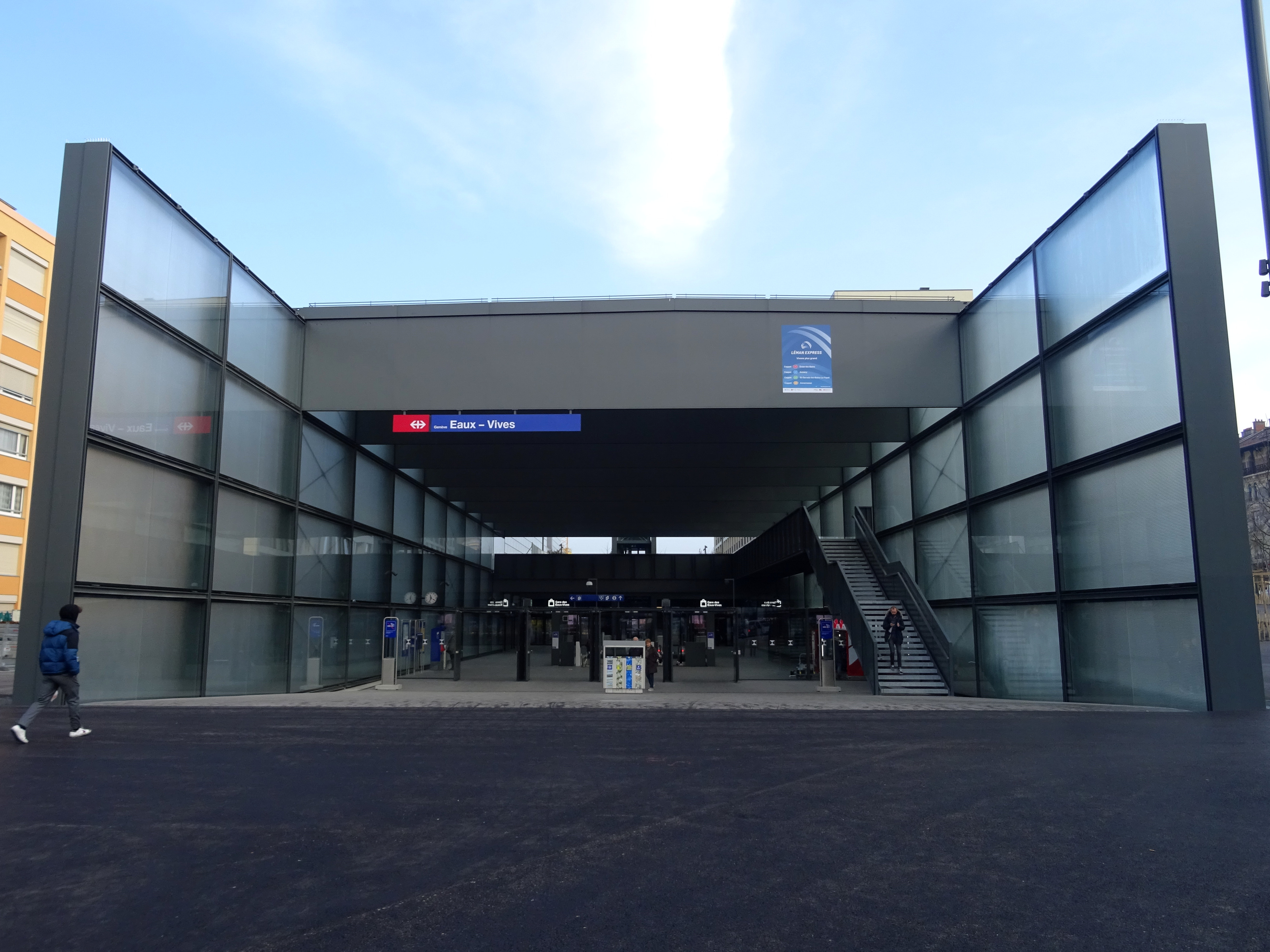
- The station entrance in 2020

General information
- Location: Geneva; Switzerland
- Coordinates: 46°12′05″N 6°10′00″E
- Elevation: 385 m (1,263 ft)
- Owner: Swiss Federal Railways
- Lines: CEVA; Annemasse-Genève-Eaux-Vives line (until 2011)
- Distance: 70.5 km (43.8 mi) from Lausanne
- Platforms: 2 (1 island platform)
- Tracks: 2
- Train operators: Swiss Federal Railways
- Connections: tpg : gare, gare/Bloch, gare/Vadier
- Tram: Tram lines and
- Bus: bus lines

Construction
- Parking: Yes (50 spaces)
- Cycle facilities: Yes (195 spaces)
- Accessible: Yes

Other information
- Station code: 8516273 (GEV)
- Fare zone: 10 (unireso)

History
- Opened: 27 May 1888
- Closed: 27 November 2011
- Rebuilt: 15 December 2019

Passengers
- 2023: 9'900 per weekday (SBB)

Services
Preceding station	SBB CFF FFS	Following station
Genève-Champel towards St-Maurice or Martigny	RE33	Chêne-Bourg towards Annemasse
Preceding station	Léman Express	Following station
Genève-Champel towards Coppet	L1	Chêne-Bourg towards Évian-les-Bains
Genève-Champel towards Coppet	L2	Chêne-Bourg towards Annecy
Genève-Champel towards Coppet	L3	Chêne-Bourg towards Saint-Gervais
Genève-Champel towards Coppet	L4	Chêne-Bourg towards Annemasse
Genève-Champel towards Geneva Airport, Vernier or Lancy-Pont-Rouge	L7	Chêne-Bourg towards Annemasse
Location
- Location within Switzerland Location within Canton of Geneva

Genève-Eaux-Vives railway station (French: Gare de Genève-Eaux-Vives) is a railway station in the municipality of Geneva, in the Swiss canton of Geneva. It is an intermediate stop on the standard gauge CEVA orbital railway line of Swiss Federal Railways.

The station originally opened on 27 May 1888 as Vollandes Station (French: Gare des Vollandes). At that time it was the western terminus of the Annemasse-Genève-Eaux-Vives line to Annemasse. This station was closed in 2011, and later demolished, to permit the construction of a new underground station on the CEVA line. The station reopened in December 2019 as part of the launch of the new Léman Express network.

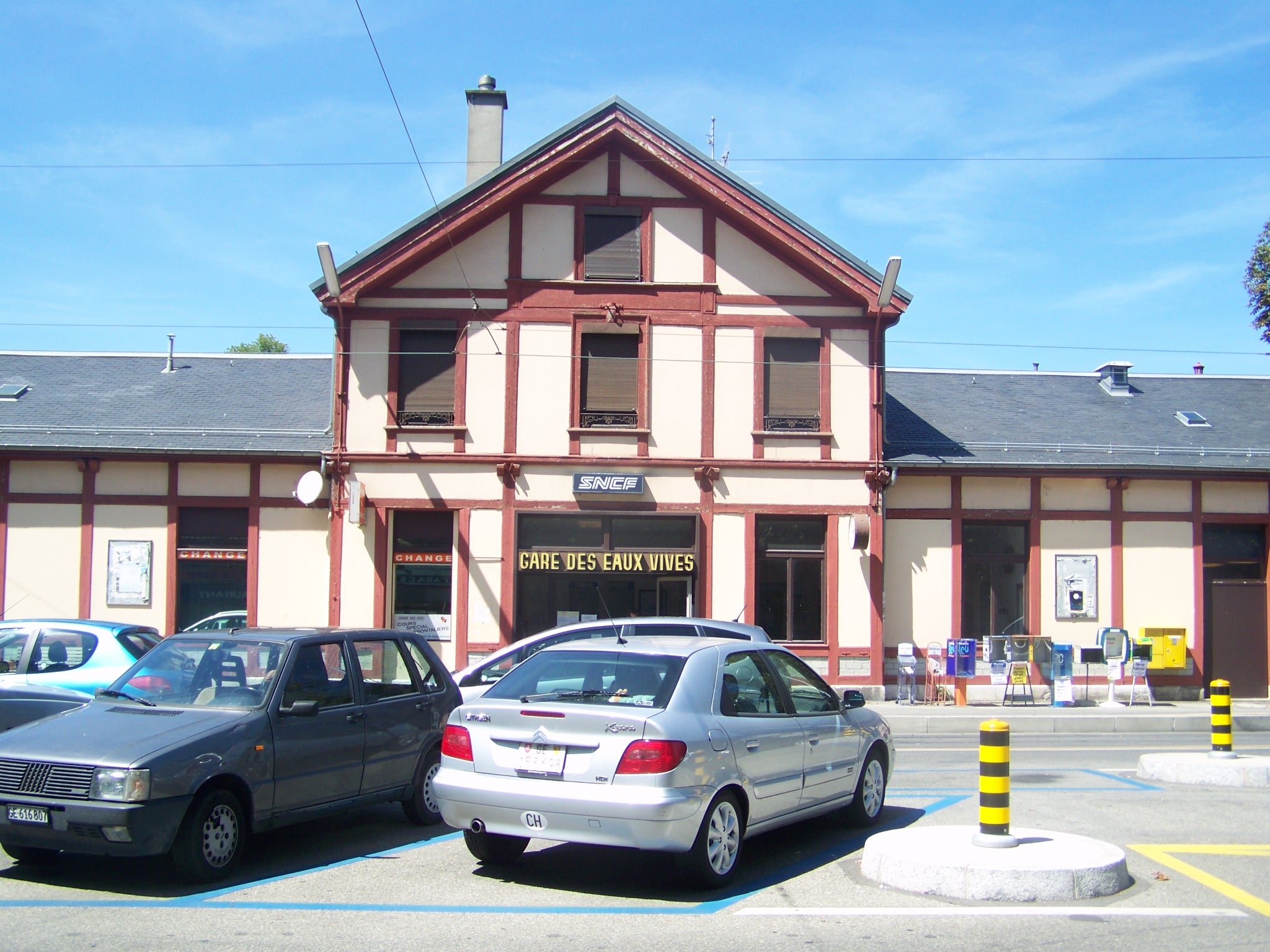
Former Vollandes station

== Services ==
As of the December 2024 timetable change, the following services stop at Genève-Eaux-Vives:

- RegioExpress: half-hourly service (hourly on weekends) between Annemasse and St-Maurice and hourly service from St-Maurice to Martigny (only on weekdays).
- Léman Express:
  - L1 / L2 / L3 / L4: service every fifteen minutes between Coppet and Annemasse; from Annemasse every hour to Annecy, half-hourly or hourly service or service every two hours to Évian-les-Bains and every two hours to Saint-Gervais-les-Bains-Le Fayet
  - L7: additional services to Annemasse and to Geneva Airport, Vernier or Lancy-Pont-Rouge
