= Gotthard Tunnel =

Railway tunnel in Switzerland

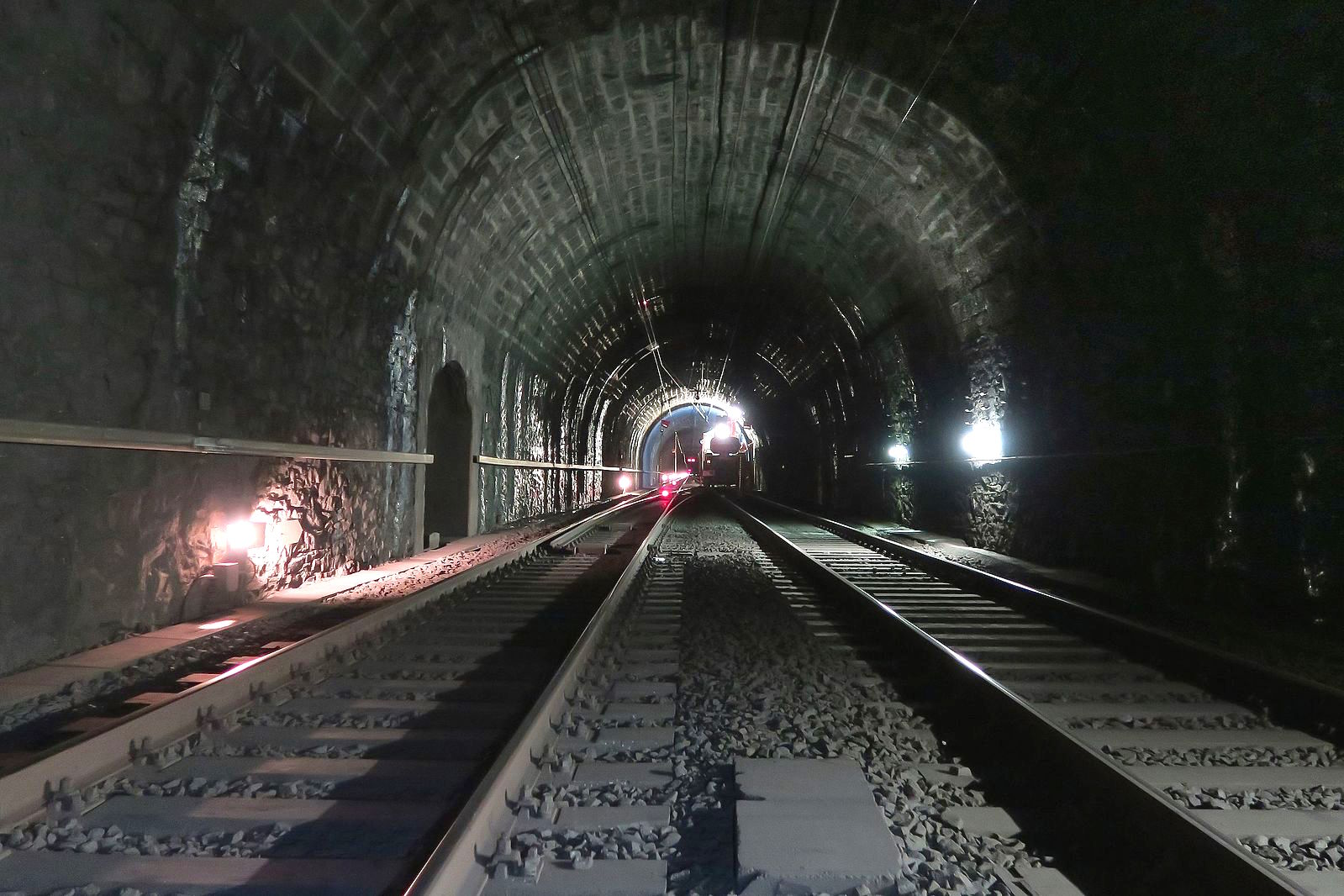
- Inside the tunnel

Overview
- Official name: German: Gotthardtunnel, Italian: Galleria del San Gottardo
- Line: Gotthard Line
- Location: Traversing the Saint-Gotthard Massif in the middle of the Swiss Alps
- Coordinates: 46°35′44″N 8°35′44″E
- System: Swiss Federal Railways (SBB CFF FFS)
- Start: Göschenen, canton of Uri (north, 1,106 m or 3,629 ft)
- End: Airolo, canton of Ticino (south, 1,145 m or 3,757 ft)

Operation
- Work began: September 13, 1872
- Opened: June 1, 1882
- Owner: SBB CFF FFS
- Operator: SBB Infrastructure
- Traffic: railway
- Character: passenger, freight

Technical
- Design engineer: Louis Favre
- Length: 15,002.64 m (9.32221 mi)
- No. of tracks: Double
- Track gauge: 1,435 mm (4 ft 8 1/2 in) (standard gauge)
- Electrified: 15 kV 16.7 Hz since September 18, 1920
- Max elevation: 1,151 m (3,776 ft) (inside the tunnel)
- Min elevation: 1,106 m (3,629 ft) (north portal)
- Tunnel clearance: 7.1 m (23 ft 4 in)
- Width: 8.0 m (26 ft 3 in)

Route map
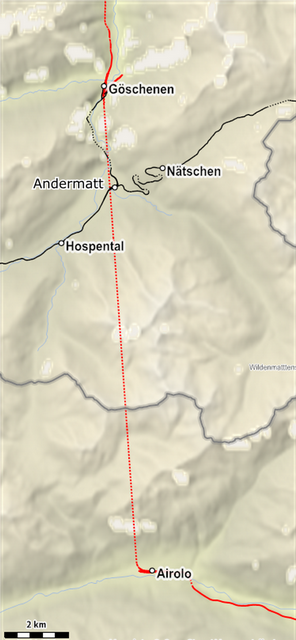
- Route map

The Gotthard Tunnel (German: Gotthardtunnel, Italian: Galleria del San Gottardo) is a 15-kilometre-long (9.3 mi) railway tunnel that forms the summit of the Gotthard Railway in Switzerland. It connects Göschenen with Airolo and was the first tunnel through the Saint-Gotthard Massif in order to bypass the St Gotthard Pass. It was built as single bore tunnel accommodating a standard gauge double-track railway throughout. When opened in 1882, the Gotthard Tunnel was the longest tunnel in the world.

The tunnel rises from the northern portal at Göschenen (1,106 m or 3,629 ft) and the highest point (1,151 m or 3,776 ft) is reached after approximately eight kilometres (5 mi). After two more kilometers, the border between the cantons of Uri and Ticino is passed; after another five kilometres (3 mi), the tunnel ends at the southern portal near to Airolo (1,142 m or 3,747 ft). The trip takes about seven to eight minutes by train. Services are operated by the Swiss Federal Railways.

== History ==
=== Background ===
The origins of the Gotthard Tunnel and its construction can be traced back to the widely-felt desire to improve interconnectivity between the European nations. Even prior to the scheme's commencement, such a tunnel had been envisioned as a necessary but singular element of a wider railway network that would connect the North Sea and the Mediterranean Sea together, opening up new commercial opportunities by facilitating the movement of goods and people between the ports of Belgium, the Netherlands, and Germany with those of Northern Italy, along with many of the major inland cities lying in between. To achieve this, it was necessary for the line to traverse the Alps around its most central point. Of all possible routes, Gotthard had historically been a favoured one for the passage of travellers by foot or packhorse.

But several other locations where the tunnel through the Alps was to be constructed were also discussed. in 1838 Zanino Volta of Como approached St.Gallen and Grisons with plans of a tunnel through the Splügen. In the 1840s, the two cantons then joined forces with the Ticino for a tunnel through the Lukmanier. The Kingdom of Sardinia then wanted a tunnel through the Grimsel, so the tunnel through the Alps would be further away from the Austrian Empire. Zurich and Tessin favored a tunnel through the Lukmanier, while Basel, Uri and Lucerne tried to prevent this at all means. In 1852, the British supported a tunnel through the Lukmanier massif, but this wasn't realized at the time. Thus in 1853, several Swiss cantons met in Lucerne for a Gotthard Conference. At the conference it was decided to request funds from the Federal Council. which declined alleging that the law prohibited the state from financially supporting private railways. But the Federal Councillor Josef Martin Knüsel supported the realization of the Gotthard Tunnel and was against the Lukmanier route. Accordingly, the Gotthard Railway Company was established in 1871 to develop such a route, the company being initially operated under the stewardship of the accomplished Swiss industrialist Alfred Escher. Prior to its formation, surveys had been conducted that determined the optimum locations for either end of the prospective tunnel to be at Göschenen and Airolo. Initially, there were difficulties encountered in securing sufficient finance for the project; accordingly the financing was distributed among a wide variety of private and public investors from Switzerland (20M CHF), Italy (45M CHF) and the German Empire (20M CHF). The confidence of both investors and engineers was bolstered by the Fréjus Rail Tunnel, the construction of which had been substantially aided by the introduction of various modern innovations that made the prospects of building long tunnels more practical than they previously had been.

It was decided that the contract to build the tunnel ought to be subject to a competitive tendering process, during which a bidding war broke out between two engineering companies, based in Geneva and Italy respectively. Ultimately, the final bid submitted by the Swiss engineer Louis Favre was selected as the best offer, receiving a contract to build the tunnel with an estimated cost of 2830 Swiss francs per meter. As a consequence of the relatively low bid, which contrasted poorly against the additional costs that were incurred during construction, Favre increasingly found himself at odds with Swiss politicians and investors alike.

Even prior to the onset of construction activity, the location of the tunnel presented challenges that exceeded those of the earlier Fréjus Rail Tunnel; due to both the steepness and height of the summits, surveys using direct observation were impossible, thus more complex indirect techniques combining triangulation and accurate cartography were performed by a team headed by M. Gelpke, and subsequently confirmed by a second team led by M. Koppe via different methodology.

=== Construction ===
During 1871, construction of the Gotthard Tunnel proper commenced. It would take ten years to complete. Boring was commenced from both sides simultaneously, being reliant upon accurate surveying to keep each bore in alignment with one another. Amongst other feats, the boring process involved the first large-scale use of dynamite, a relatively recent innovation that had only been patented in 1867. Another key innovation was the use of mechanised tunneling machines, which Favre, supervisor of the work as well as prime contractor, strongly advocated for, despite pressure to make greater use of manual boring. The engineering used to create the tunnel can be largely credited to Favre, although he was unable to see its completion, having suffered a fatal heart attack while inside the tunnel on 19 July 1879, barely six months before breakthrough would be achieved.

The tunnel's construction proved difficult on account of multiple factors technical, geological, and financial. The copious supply of water, which was necessary in order to power any heavy equipment at the time, was unreliable; the Tremola spring was one source, but would greatly change in capacity seasonally, leading to water being extracted from the more distant river Ticino instead. At the suggestion of the Geneva-based engineer M. Colladon, it was decided to use compressed air as a means of conveying energy around the worksite and along the bores. Air was compressed by water-driven pumps and stored in cooled reservoirs prior to use; as the air pipes traversed greater and greater distances, the diameter of the pipes used was increased in order to maintain pressure. To reduce the heat of the rock during drilling, water jets were routinely used to cool the rockface.

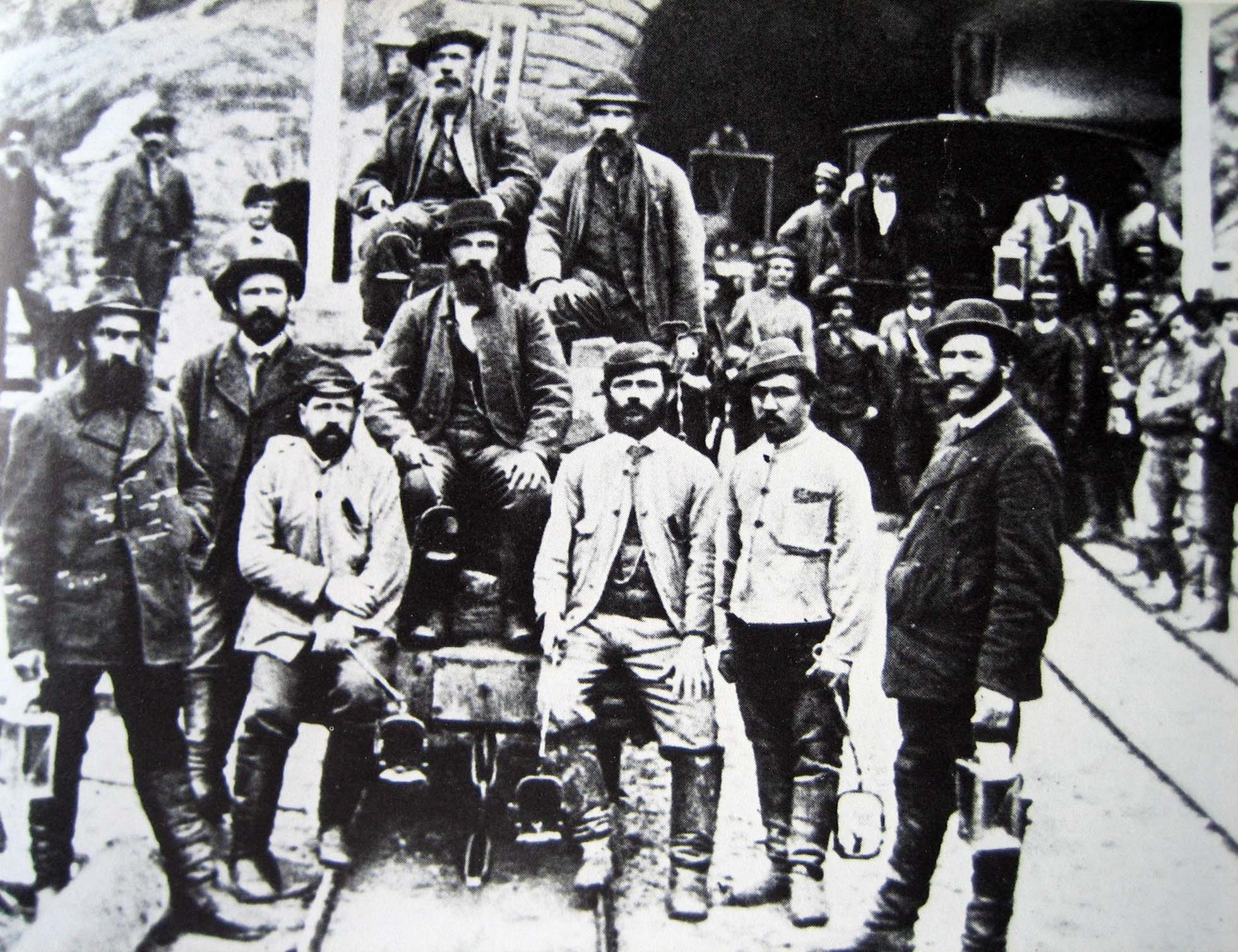
Workers in Airolo (1880)

While the geology encountered typically comprised rocks of sufficient hardness for mechanical drilling to be used, those of exceptional hardness were often encountered, resulting in even the best drills being blunted and greatly slowing the rate of advancement, sometimes to as little as one meter per day. There was also a section of entirely disaggregated bedrock encountered, which could only be cleared using traditional manual techniques, which came with the risk of potential collapse. To attain sufficient clearance for the running of trains, the ceiling was vaulted following the completion of advanced boring.

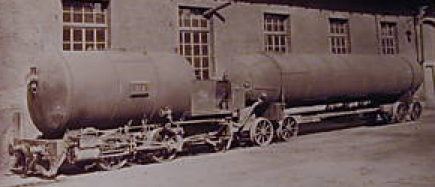
Pneumatic locomotive with attached pressure container

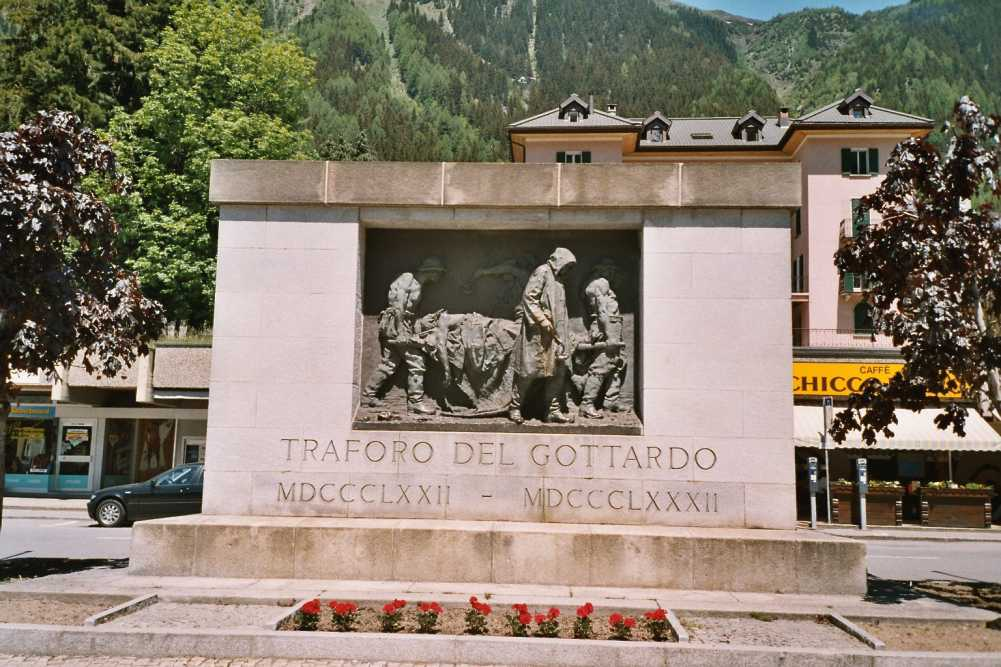
Memorial for the dead workers with a relief by Vincenzo Vela

The conditions present in either of the bores were thoroughly inhospitable during the tunnel's construction, particularly in the bore driven from Airolo, where vapours were persistently present throughout the work. They were also hazardous; in one major accident alone, around 200 workers (the exact number is not known) were killed largely by the compressed air-driven trains that were used to carry excavated material out of the tunnel; other tunnel workers were killed as a result of rock slides, dynamite explosions, and a few drowned due to water inrushes. Of those that survived, several suffered from serious health issues caused by a hookworm epidemic (Ancylostoma duodenale). Medical investigations led to "major advances in parasitology, by way of research into the aetiology, epidemiology and treatment of ancylostomiasis". During 1875, the workforce went on strike; this was promptly violently suppressed by local police force (21 men) from Altdorf, resulting in four deaths amongst the workers and the wounding of 13 others. Consequently, 80 workers left the building site.

During 29 February 1880, it was announced that both of the tunnel's advance borings had broken through into one another around the mountain's middle point. It was also observed that a high degree of accuracy had successfully been achieved, a testament to the stringent surveying and directing that had been performed throughout the construction phase. The occasion was widely publicised and hailed as a major engineering triumph; the engineer Adolphe Gautier described it at the time as being "the greatest work hitherto attempted by man".

Following this milestone, a further two years of construction work continued upon the tunnel. This period of activity largely revolved around removing the excess spoil and the completion of its masonry. These finishing works were considered to be relatively low risk compared with the preceding boring that had taken so long, and was actually easier to complete than the approach lines to meet with either end of the tunnel.

== Operation ==
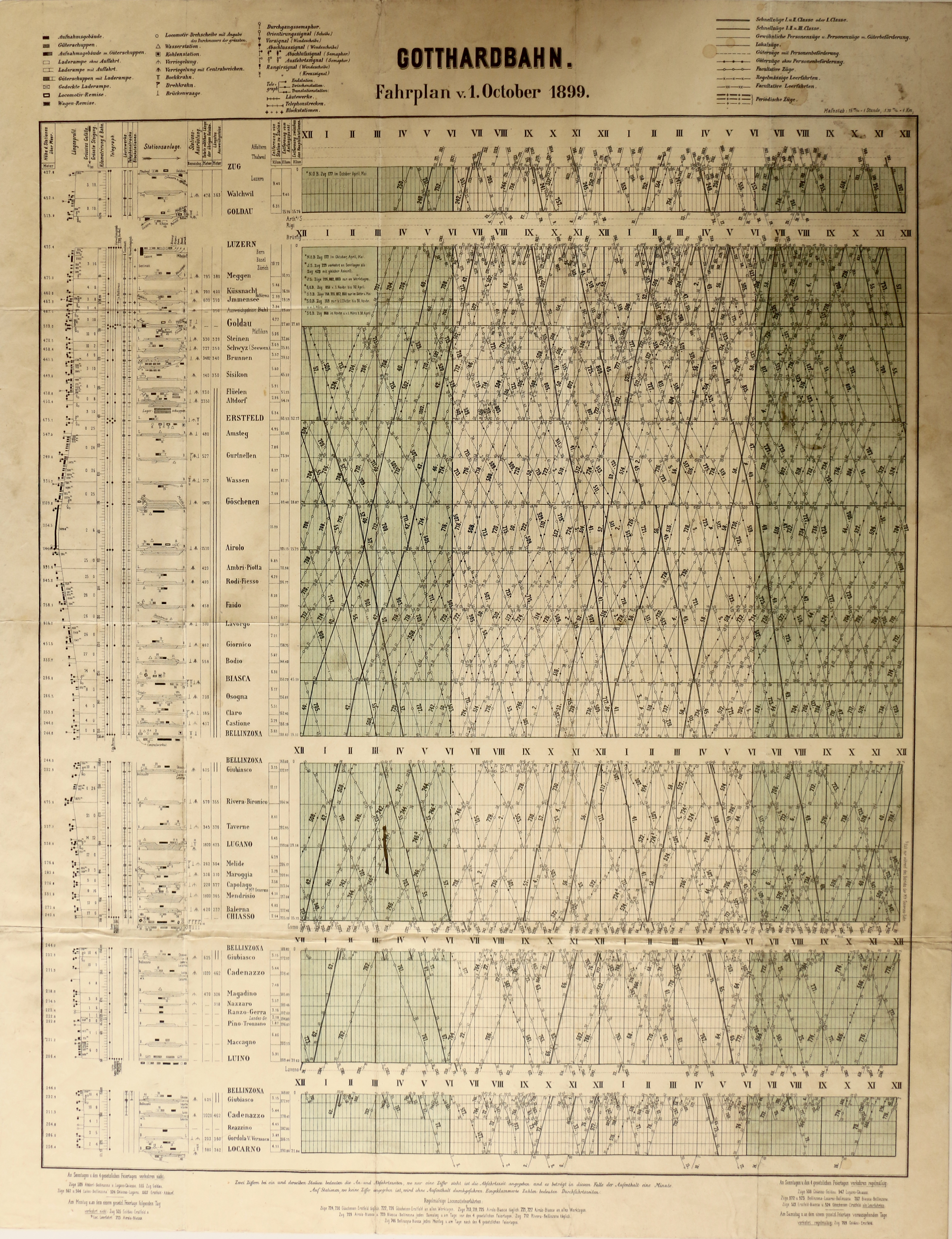
Timetable of Gotthard Railway showing the traffic leading through the tunnel in 1899

On 1 January 1882, the Gotthard Tunnel was opened for traffic for the first time. The opening drew substantial international attention; the president of Switzerland, Simeon Bavier, praised the project and declare it to be: "A triumph of art and science, a monument to work and diligence! The barrier which divided nations has fallen, the Swiss Alps have been breached. Countries have moved closer to each other, the world market is open!".

Initially, the tunnel was operated by the private railway company Gotthardbahn, which ran conventional trains drawn by steam locomotives between Lucerne and Chiasso at the Italian border. According to Gautier, at the time of the tunnel's construction, there were proposal to operate trains hauled by atmospheric locomotives through the tunnel; however, he voiced his scepticism over the value of doing so in comparison to the additional work that would need to be performed to facilitate such rolling stock being operated. There were also some concerns over the tunnel's ventilation being sufficient considering the challenging conditions encountered during construction, but it was believed that these would settle during routine operations without the need for extensive intervention.

During 1909, the Gotthardbahn was integrated into the Swiss Federal Railways. On 18 October 1920, the first electric trains were run through the Gotthard Tunnel. Initially, the voltage had to be reduced from the desired 15 kilovolts to 7.5 kV, because the grime deposited on the insulators by the steam locomotives encouraged excessive arcing. However, in May the next year, steam was replaced entirely by electric traction, and the problem of soot and grime was eliminated.

During 1932, a memorial for those workers who had died during the tunnel's construction was erected close to the station building at Airolo. The memorial contains a relief produced by Vincenzo Vela from 1882/1883, titled "Vittime del lavoro" (Victims of labour).

Until the opening of the Gotthard Road Tunnel in 1980, the Swiss Federal Railways offered car shuttle train services for cars and trucks through the Gotthard Tunnel. Today, that service exists as the rolling highway from the German to the Italian border and aims to reduce truck traffic on Swiss expressways. An improvisational piggyback service from Göschenen to Airolo was offered during the two-month closure of the Gotthard Road Tunnel following a fatal fire caused by a collision in 2001.

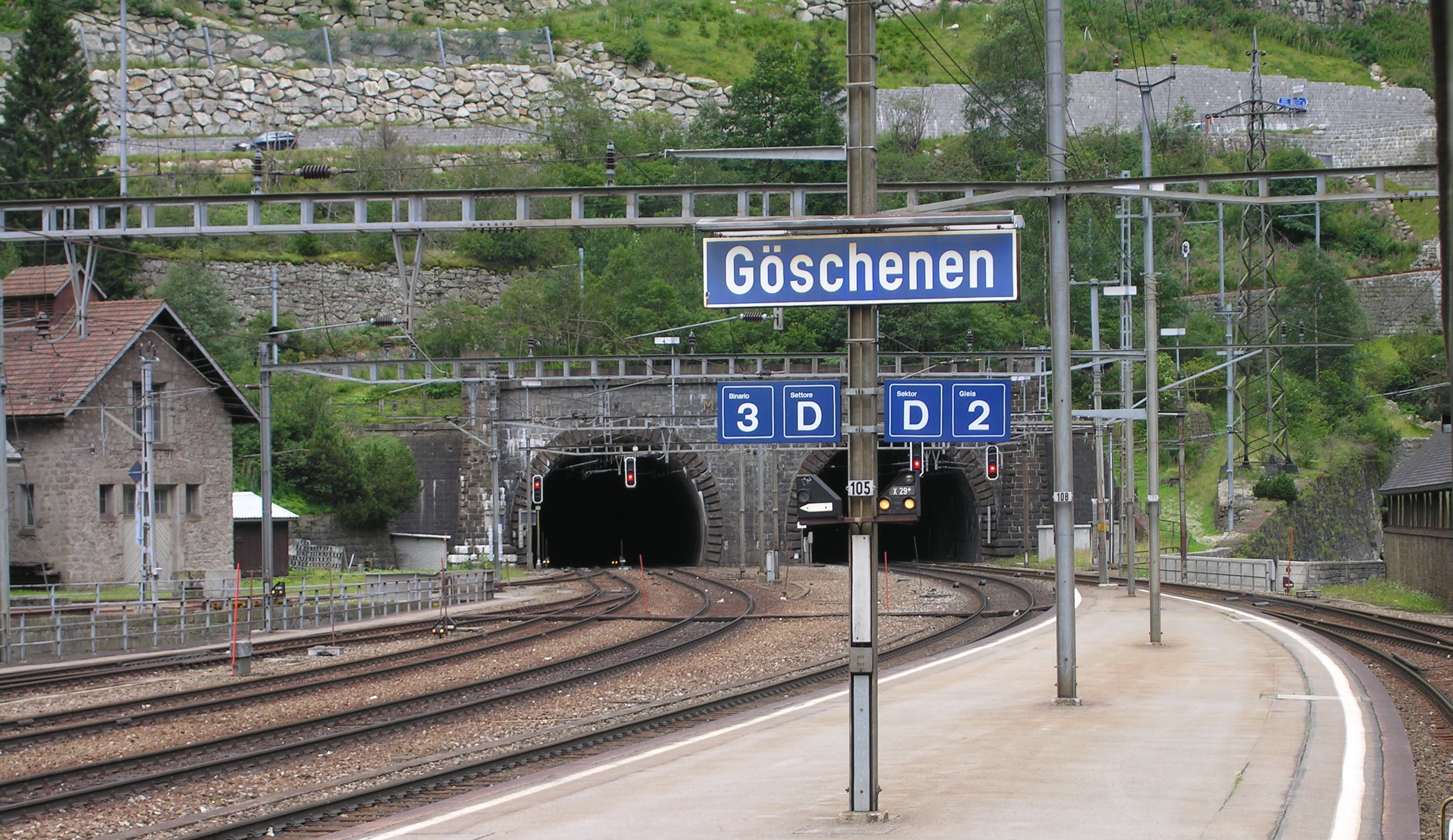
Entry to the Gotthard Tunnel at Göschenen

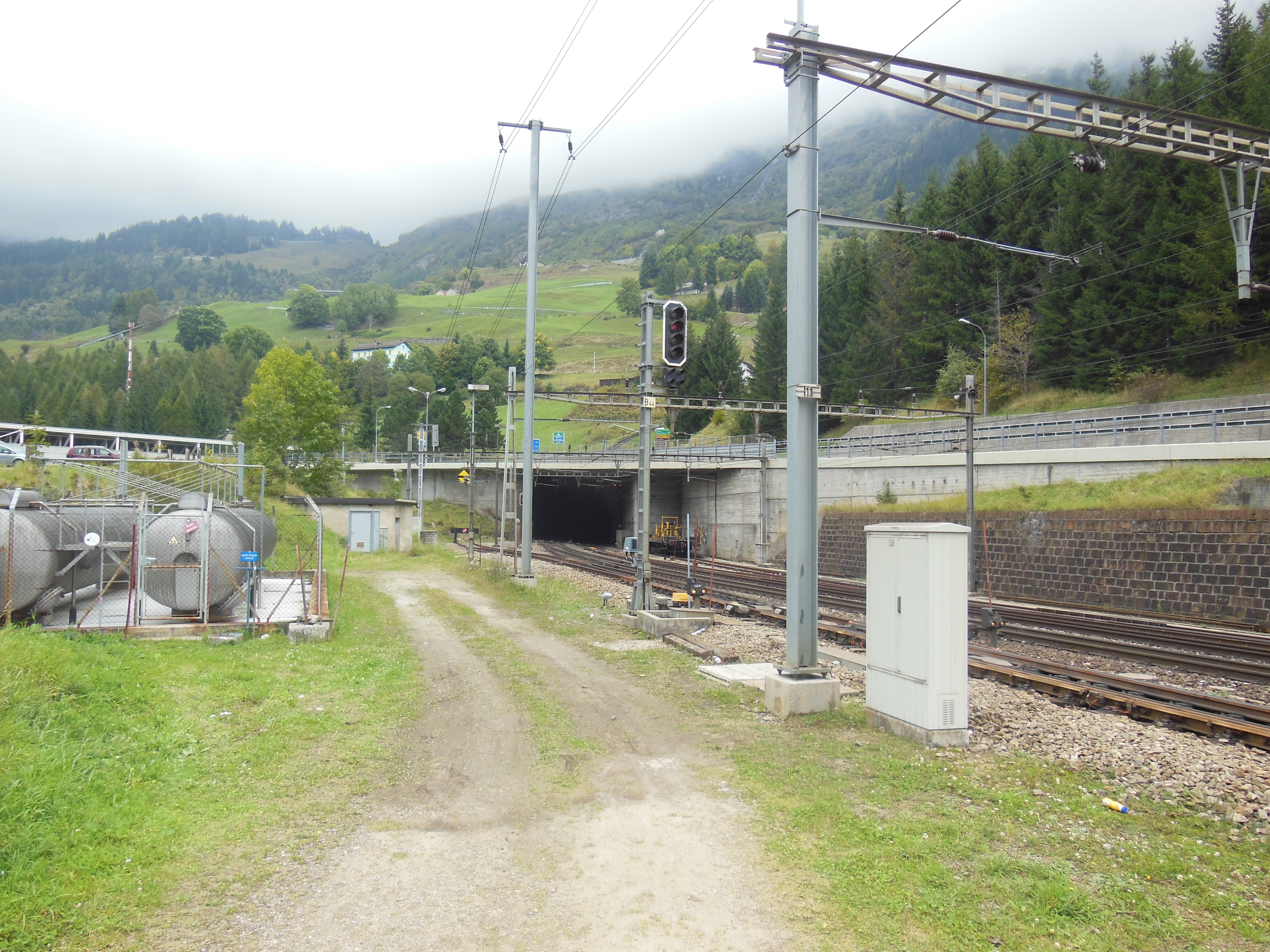
Entry to the Gotthard Tunnel at Airolo

== Neighbouring tunnels ==
The adjacent ramps include several turn tunnels (see Table of turn tunnels). While a triumph of its era and an example of pioneering engineering, the Gotthard Tunnel was considered to be relatively slow to traverse by twentieth century standards, leading to talk of building a superior successor tunnel as early as the 1940s. During 1980, the neighbouring Gotthard Road Tunnel was opened; by 2016, it was reportedly being used to convey around one million freight lorries each year. A second railway tunnel, the Gotthard Base Tunnel, was opened on 1 June 2016 after 17 years of construction; in comparison, it is considerably longer (at 57.1 km, it is the world's longest railway tunnel) and at an about 500 m lower elevation than the first Gotthard Tunnel, enabling trains to traverse the Central Alps on a flat and straight route and therefore more efficiently, at higher speeds, with much less energy consumption, and longer freight trains.

== See also ==
- Gotthard Base Tunnel
- Gotthard Road Tunnel
- Gotthard Panorama Express
- NRLA
- Saint-Gotthard Massif
- St Gotthard Pass

Records
Preceded by Fréjus Rail Tunnel	Longest tunnel 1882–1906	Succeeded by Simplon Tunnel
