= CEVA rail =

Railway line from Geneva, Switzerland to Annemasse, France

CEVA; Cornavin‒Eaux Vives‒Annemasse
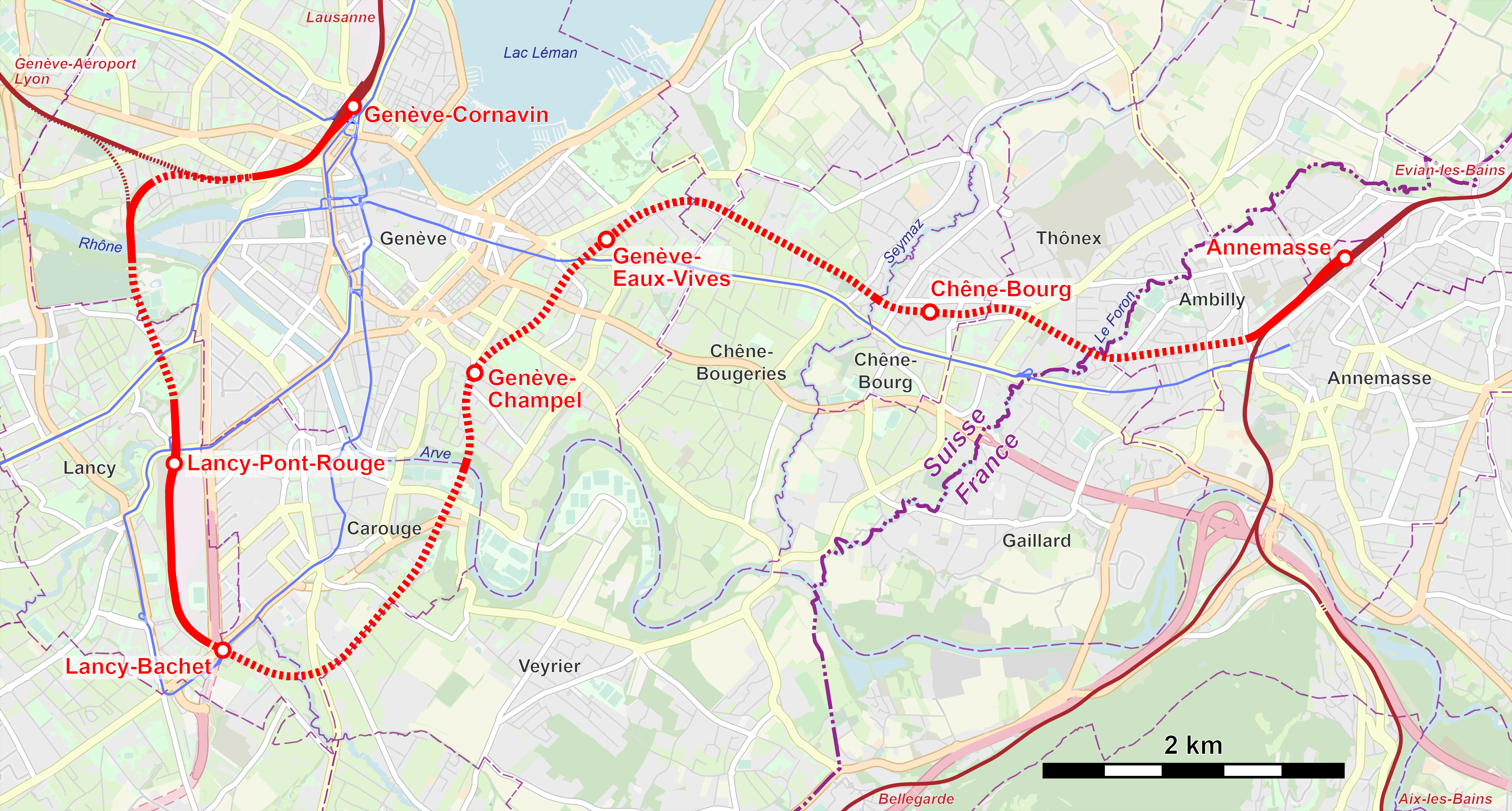
- Map of the CEVA railway line

Overview
- Status: Open
- Owner: CFF
- Locale: Switzerland (canton of Geneva) and France (Haute-Savoie)
- Termini: Genève-Cornavin railway station, Geneva; Annemasse railway station, France

Service
- Type: Commuter
- System: SNCF and CFF
- Operator(s): CFF

History
- Opened: 15 December 2019

Technical
- Line length: 14.1 km (8.8 mi)
- Number of tracks: Double track
- Track gauge: 1,435 mm (4 ft 8 1/2 in) standard gauge
- Electrification: 15 kV 16.67 Hz

CEVA (Cornavin‒Eaux-Vives‒Annemasse) is an orbital rail line designed to connect the main railway station of Geneva, Switzerland (Gare de Cornavin) on the north of Lake Geneva with the Gare d'Annemasse in Annemasse, France, to the south of Lake Geneva. The link allows through running between the main Swiss rail network and the until then isolated line east of Annemasse in Haute-Savoie, which was served until 2013 by French SNCF services. A new station was constructed on the route at Gare des Eaux-Vives and the line between this station and the border was replaced with a double track line in tunnel. Track already existed as far as Stade de Genève station; the full route opened on 15 December 2019 to Léman Express and RegioExpress services.

== Background ==
The project was to build the remaining section of an outer ring link connecting Geneva (Cornavin station) with Annemasse running through Geneva's west, south and south eastern suburbs. It was planned to enhance the public transport network of the Geneva region, which increasingly over the years has become a trans-frontier conurbation, with thousands of cross-border daily commuters travelling between the Geneva area and surrounding regions of France. It links the CFF route Lausanne – Geneva Cornavin – Geneva Airport and the SNCF route Geneva Cornavin – Bellegarde-sur-Valserine – Lyon with lines in the Haute Savoie serving Thonon-les-Bains, Évian-les-Bains, and the Arve valley to St Gervais and Chamonix as well as Annemasse to Annecy.

The origins of the project go back to 1850. In 1888 the Eaux-Vives to Annemasse line was opened. At Eaux Vives, the abutments were built for a bridge across the main road on the alignment of the proposed link round to Cornavin. This Geneva ring was part of a proposed new link to the Simplon route to Italy, using a direct route from Paris and Dijon under the Jura mountains via the Faucille tunnel to Geneva, round the 'CEVA' route and along the south side of Lake Geneva to St-Maurice. This was never realised due to competition from the Vaud canton which succeeded in keeping the Dijon – Vallorbe – Lausanne – St Maurice route as the main Simplon line to Italy.

A contract of 1912 between the Confederation and the canton said that each partner would pay one third of construction costs of CEVA and SBB a further third.

In 1949 the first section of the ring was built, connecting Cornavin station to a large new freight marshalling yard at La Praille, but was used only for freight. Until 2013 the Eaux-Vives – Annemasse line remained an isolated shuttle served by SNCF trains, although the line (infrastructure) was legally the Geneva State Railway (French: Chemin de Fer de l'Etat de Genève).

After numerous false starts over a century, the ring line project was reborn in the 1990s and a passenger service was introduced on the La Praille line as far as Lancy-Pont-Rouge station which opened on 19 December 2002 and is the present terminus for the regional trains coming from Coppet in Vaud, after passing through Geneva's Cornavin station. Pont Rouge acts as an interchange to the Geneva tram route 15.

The first official CEVA project work was undertaken in the last two years, and consisted of widening Cornavin station on its south side, to allow room for a platform for use by CEVA trains. This entailed the wholesale moving of a historic listed building by a few metres.

== Construction ==
Approval of the plans by the Federal Office of Transport was given on 5 May 2008, but opponents brought the case to court. The Federal Administrative Court rejected the plea in June 2011 but the opponents also took the last step, going to the Federal Court.

On 28 March 2012, the Federal Administrative Court rejected all remaining objections, thus concluding the legal process and allowing the works to proceed freely.

In 2012, Eaux-Vives station closed and the disused Chêne-Bourg station was reopened until 1 April 2013, when all train services stopped to allow construction to start. A substitute bus service from Annemasse to Eaux-Vives began running.

The CEVA line is electrified with the Swiss 15 kV 16.7 Hz including a track to one of the Annemasse platforms. To simplify electrification situation in the Geneva area, the portion between Genève-Cornavin and Bellegarde was changed from 1500 V DC to 25 kV 50 Hz AC in summer 2014.

The new service over the CEVA line opened in December 2019; it was branded as Léman Express and operated with new Stadler FLIRT electric multiple unit trains built in Switzerland by Stadler Rail.

== Route ==
Since completion, a continuous railway route runs from Cornavin station via La Praille, Bachet-de-Pesay, over the river Arve, in tunnel under the commune of Champel and on past Eaux-Vives, underground to Annemasse, as a financing for the French part of the new infrastructure was found.

The CEVA project consisted of four principal sectors:

1. Between Cornavin station and Bachet-de-Pesay: the CFF line (which has existed since 1949) between Cornavin and the Gare de la Praille has been refurbished.
2. Between Bachet-de-Pesay and the Gare des Eaux-Vives: a new CFF line was built, which crosses the river Arve by means of a bridge, then runs under the commune of Champel by means of a tunnel.
3. Between the Gare des Eaux-Vives and the French–Swiss border: the single-track SNCF line which has existed since 1888 was removed and a new double-track underground line was built covering the same route as the existing above ground line.
4. Between the border and Annemasse: the single-track SNCF line which has been in place since 1888 was upgraded. However, until recently, neither the owner Réseau Ferré de France (RFF, now SNCF Réseau) nor French authorities had made a step towards financing and realising this part of the line.

== See also ==
- Herzstück Basel, similar project in Basel
