= IIL =

IIL may stand for

- Indian Independence League
- Integrated injection logic
- The Insurance Institute of London
- The Institut International de Lancy
- II-L or IIL, a subtype of Type II supernova
