= Genève-Champel railway station =

Railway station in Geneva, Switzerland

Genève-Champel
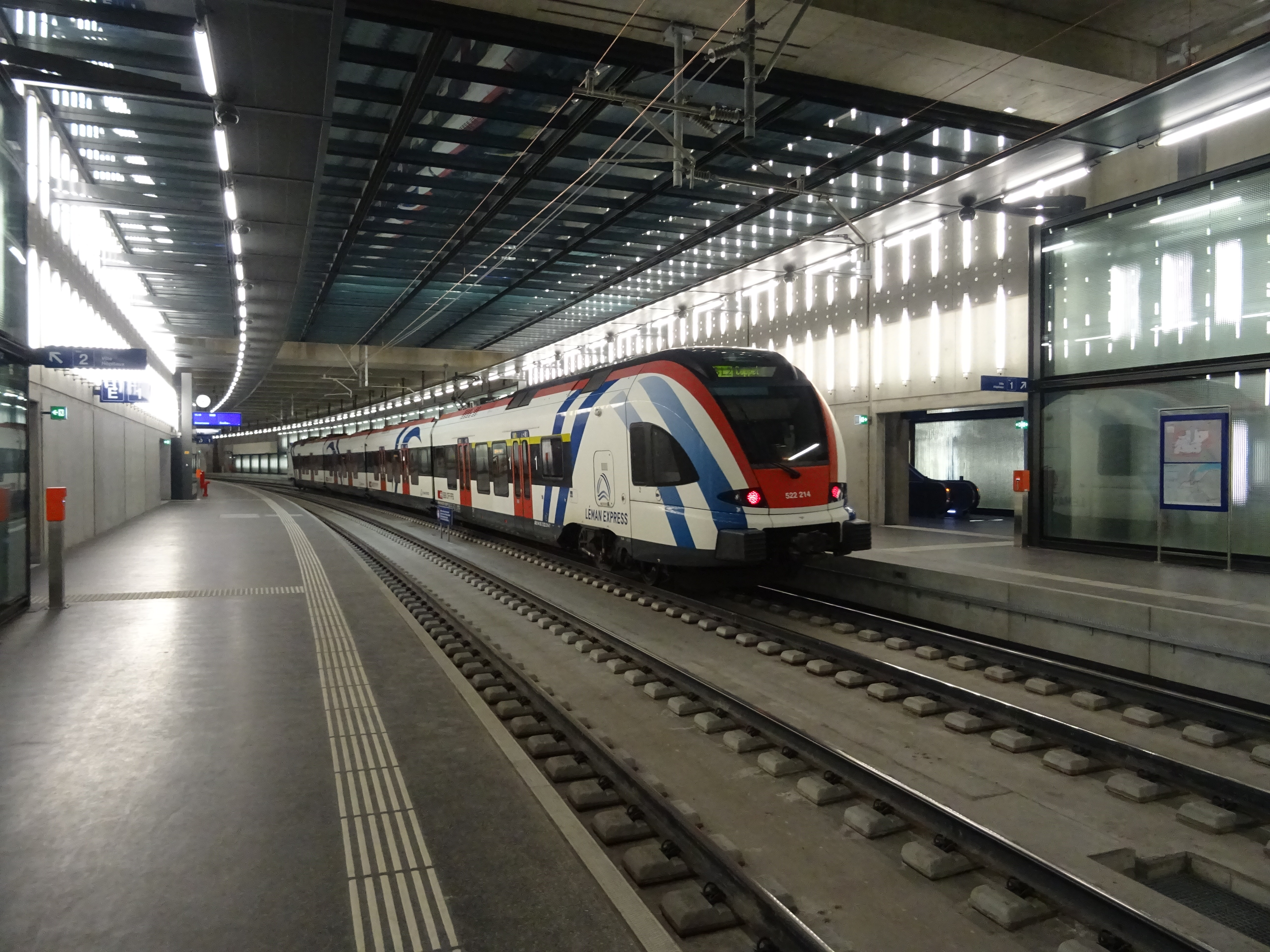
- A Léman Express train at the station in 2020

General information
- Location: Geneva; Switzerland
- Coordinates: 46°11′32″N 6°09′13″E
- Elevation: 389 m (1,276 ft)
- Owner: Swiss Federal Railways
- Line: CEVA
- Distance: 68.9 km (42.8 mi) from Lausanne
- Platforms: 2 side platforms
- Tracks: 2
- Train operators: Swiss Federal Railways
- Connections: tpg : gare, gare/Hôpital, gare/Peschier
- Trolleybus: trolleybus lines
- Bus: bus lines

Construction
- Parking: Yes
- Cycle facilities: Yes (38 spaces)
- Accessible: Yes

Other information
- Station code: 8516272 (CHHO)
- Fare zone: 10 (unireso)

History
- Opened: 15 December 2019

Passengers
- 2023: 6'400 per weekday (SBB)

Services
Preceding station	SBB CFF FFS	Following station
Lancy-Bachet towards St-Maurice or Martigny	RE33	Genève-Eaux-Vives towards Annemasse
Preceding station	Léman Express	Following station
Lancy-Bachet towards Coppet	L1	Genève-Eaux-Vives towards Évian-les-Bains
Lancy-Bachet towards Coppet	L2	Genève-Eaux-Vives towards Annecy
Lancy-Bachet towards Coppet	L3	Genève-Eaux-Vives towards Saint-Gervais
Lancy-Bachet towards Coppet	L4	Genève-Eaux-Vives towards Annemasse
Lancy-Bachet towards Geneva Airport, Vernier or Lancy-Pont-Rouge	L7	Genève-Eaux-Vives towards Annemasse
Location
- Location within Switzerland Location within Canton of Geneva

Genève-Champel railway station (French: Gare de Genève-Champel) is a railway station in the municipality of Geneva, in the Swiss canton of Geneva. It is an intermediate stop on the standard gauge CEVA orbital railway line of Swiss Federal Railways. The station opened in December 2019 as part of the launch of the new Léman Express network. During the planning and development process the station was known as Champel-Hôpital.

== Services ==
As of the December 2024 timetable change, the following services stop at Genève-Champel:

- RegioExpress: half-hourly service (hourly on weekends) between Annemasse and St-Maurice and hourly service from St-Maurice to Martigny (only on weekdays).
- Léman Express:
  - L1 / L2 / L3 / L4: service every fifteen minutes between Coppet and Annemasse; from Annemasse every hour to Annecy, half-hourly or hourly service or service every two hours to Évian-les-Bains and every two hours to Saint-Gervais-les-Bains-Le Fayet
  - L7: additional services to Annemasse and to Geneva Airport, Vernier or Lancy-Pont-Rouge
