= Lancy-Bachet railway station =

Railway station in Lancy, Switzerland

Lancy-Bachet
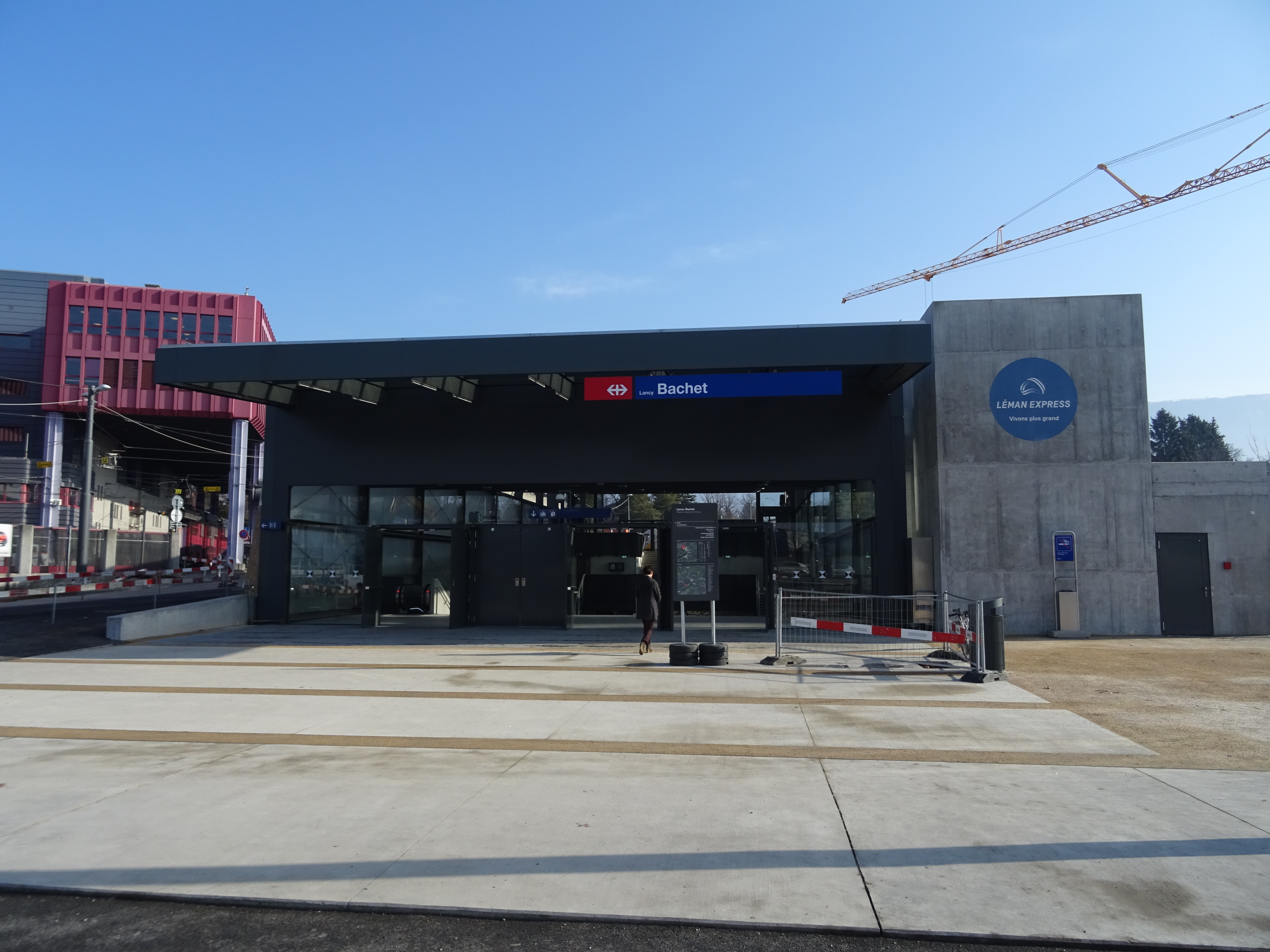
- The station entrance in 2020

General information
- Location: Lancy; Switzerland
- Coordinates: 46°10′28″N 6°07′46″E
- Elevation: 383 m (1,257 ft)
- Owner: Swiss Federal Railways
- Line: CEVA
- Distance: 65.7 km (40.8 mi) from Lausanne
- Platforms: 2 side platforms
- Tracks: 2
- Train operators: Swiss Federal Railways
- Connections: tpg
- Tram: Tram lines and
- Bus: bus lines

Construction
- Parking: Yes
- Cycle facilities: Yes (515 spaces)
- Accessible: Yes

Other information
- Station code: 8517142 (CABA)
- Fare zone: 10 (unireso)

History
- Opened: 15 December 2019

Passengers
- 2024: 8,300 per weekday (SBB)

Services
Preceding station	SBB CFF FFS	Following station
Lancy-Pont-Rouge towards St-Maurice or Martigny	RE33	Genève-Champel towards Annemasse
Preceding station	Léman Express	Following station
Lancy-Pont-Rouge towards Coppet	L1	Genève-Champel towards Évian-les-Bains
Lancy-Pont-Rouge towards Coppet	L2	Genève-Champel towards Annecy
Lancy-Pont-Rouge towards Coppet	L3	Genève-Champel towards Saint-Gervais
Lancy-Pont-Rouge towards Coppet	L4	Genève-Champel towards Annemasse
Lancy-Pont-Rouge Terminus	L7	Genève-Champel towards Annemasse
Lancy-Pont-Rouge towards Geneva Airport or Vernier	L7	Genève-Champel towards Annemasse
Location
- Location within Switzerland Location within Canton of Geneva

Lancy-Bachet railway station (French: Gare de Lancy-Bachet) is a railway station in the municipality of Lancy, in the Swiss canton of Geneva. It is an intermediate stop on the standard gauge CEVA orbital railway line of Swiss Federal Railways. The station opened in December 2019 as part of the launch of the new Léman Express network. During the planning and development process the station was also known as Carouge-Bachet and Geneva-Bachet.

== Services ==
As of the December 2025 timetable change, the following services stop at Lancy-Bachet:

- RegioExpress: half-hourly service (hourly on weekends) between Annemasse and St-Maurice and hourly service from St-Maurice to Martigny (only on weekdays)
- Léman Express:
  - L1 / L2 / L3 / L4: service every fifteen minutes between Coppet and Annemasse; from Annemasse every hour to Annecy, half-hourly or hourly service or service every two hours to Évian-les-Bains and every two hours to Saint-Gervais-les-Bains-Le Fayet
  - L7: additional services to Annemasse and to Geneva Airport, Vernier or Lancy-Pont-Rouge
