= Collège de Saussure =

Coordinates: 46.1852°N 6.1141°E

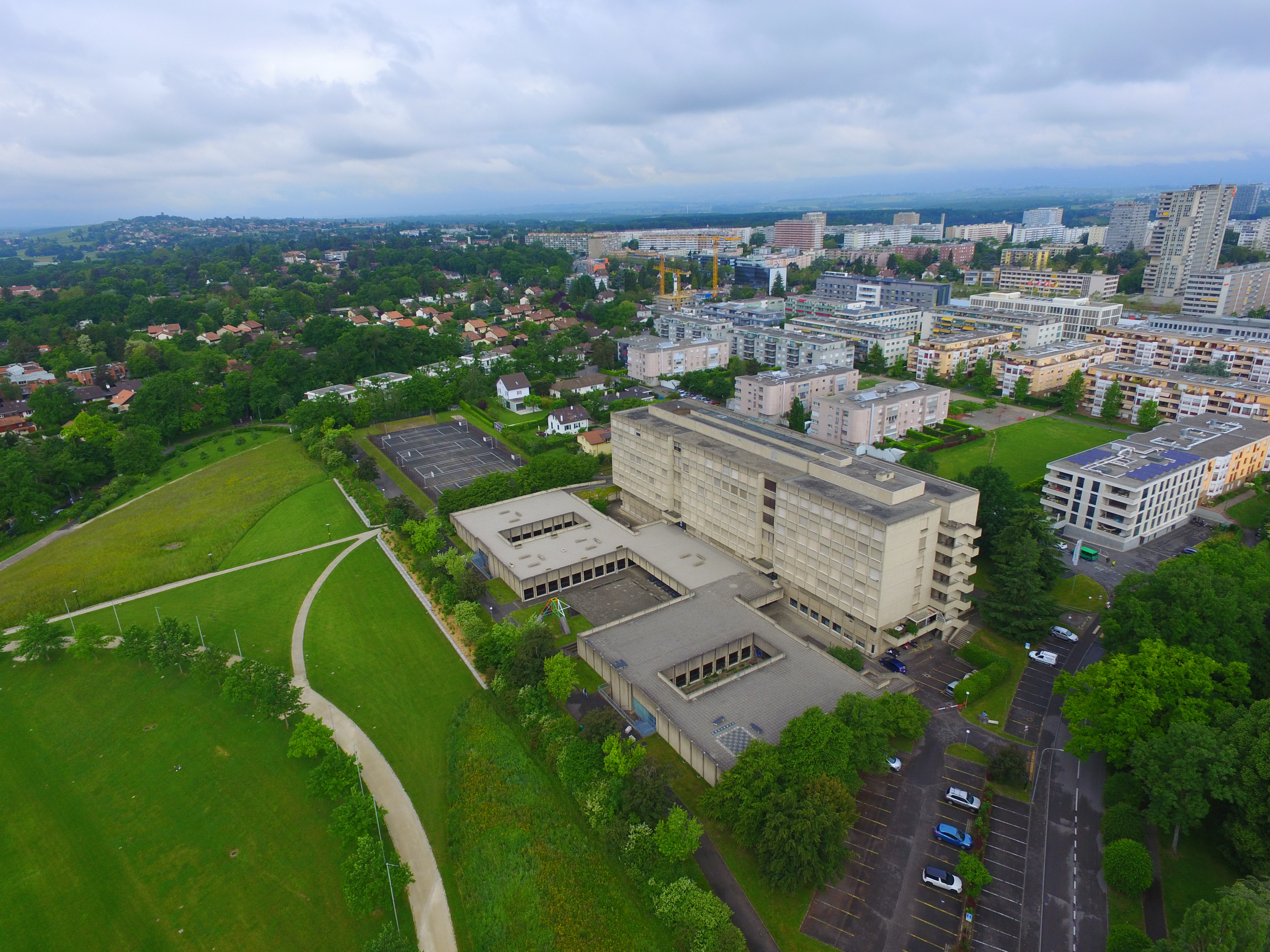

Information
- Teaching staff: c.150
- Enrollment: c.1,000 (2016)
- Website: edu.ge.ch/secondaire2/saus/accueil

Collège de Saussure is a level 2 secondary school (École de maturité) in Petit-Lancy, Lancy, Switzerland, near Geneva.

As of 2016 it has about 1,000 students and 150 teachers.

Collège de Saussure, Geneva, Switzerland

== Notable alumni ==
- Didier Queloz
- Julia Steinberger

== Notable employees ==
- Tariq Ramadan
