= Thomas Greytak =

American physicist

- Education: MIT
- Known for: Atomic physics
- Scientific career
- Fields: Physics, especially condensed matter
- Workplaces: MIT
- Doctoral students: Julia Steinberger
- Website: web.mit.edu/physics/people/faculty/greytak_thomas.html

Thomas John Greytak is the Lester Wolfe Professor of Physics, emeritus, at the Massachusetts Institute of Technology. His areas of research include experimental low temperature condensed matter physics and superfluid systems. Currently, he is working with Daniel Kleppner on research concerning ultra cooled atomic hydrogen.

All of his academic degrees are from MIT (SB and MS degrees in Electrical Engineering (1963) and a PhD in Physics (1967)).

He was married to Elizabeth Bardeen, daughter of Nobel Laureate, John Bardeen.
