= An Introduction to Mechanics =

Undergraduate textbook

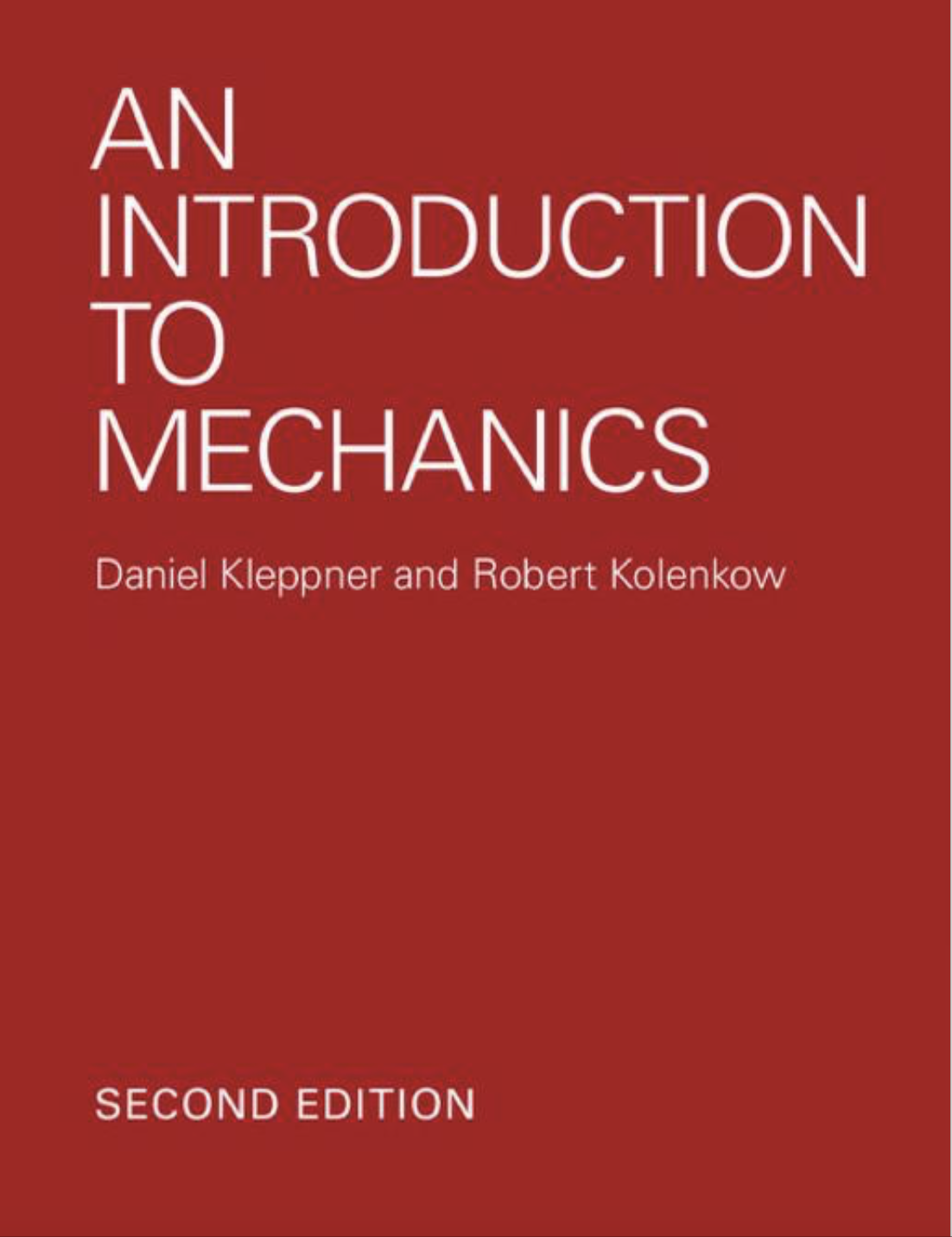
- Cover of the second edition
- Author: Daniel Kleppner; Robert J. Kolenkow
- Language: English
- Subject: Classical mechanics
- Genre: Non-fiction
- Publisher: McGraw Hill; Cambridge University Press
- Publication date: 1973, 2010, 2013
- Publication place: United States; United Kingdom
- Pages: 542
- ISBN: 9780521198219
- OCLC: 1059566786

An Introduction to Mechanics, commonly referred to as Kleppner and Kolenkow, is an undergraduate-level textbook on classical mechanics written by physicists Daniel Kleppner and Robert J. Kolenkow. It originated as the textbook for a one-semester mechanics course at the Massachusetts Institute of Technology, where both Kleppner and Kolenkow taught, intended to go deeper than an ordinary first-year course.

The first edition was published in 1973 by McGraw Hill and republished in 2010 by Cambridge University Press (CUP), which also published the second edition in 2013.

== Table of contents (2nd edition) ==
- Preface
- To the Teacher
- List of Examples
- Chapter 1: Vectors and Kinematics
- Chapter 2: Newton's Laws
- Chapter 3: Forces and Equations of Motion
- Chapter 4: Momentum
- Chapter 5: Energy
- Chapter 6: Topics in Dynamics
- Chapter 7: Angular Momentum and Fixed Axis Rotation
- Chapter 8: Rigid Body Motion
- Chapter 9: Non-Inertial Systems and Fictitious Forces
- Chapter 10: Central Force Motion
- Chapter 11: The Harmonic Oscillator
- Chapter 12: The Special Theory of Relativity
- Chapter 13: Relativistic Dynamics
- Chapter 14: Spacetime Physics
- Hints, Clues, and Answers to Selected Problems
- Appendix A: Miscellaneous Physical and Astronomical Data
- Appendix B: Greek Alphabet
- Appendix C: SI Prefixes
- Index

== Reception ==
The first edition of the book was criticized for sexism in the exercises, though this was improved in the second edition.

== See also ==
- Classical Mechanics by Herbert Goldstein
- Course of Theoretical Physics Vol. 1: Mechanics by Lev Landau and Evgeny Lifshitz
- List of textbooks on classical mechanics and quantum mechanics
