= Julia Steinberger =

Professor of Ecological Economics

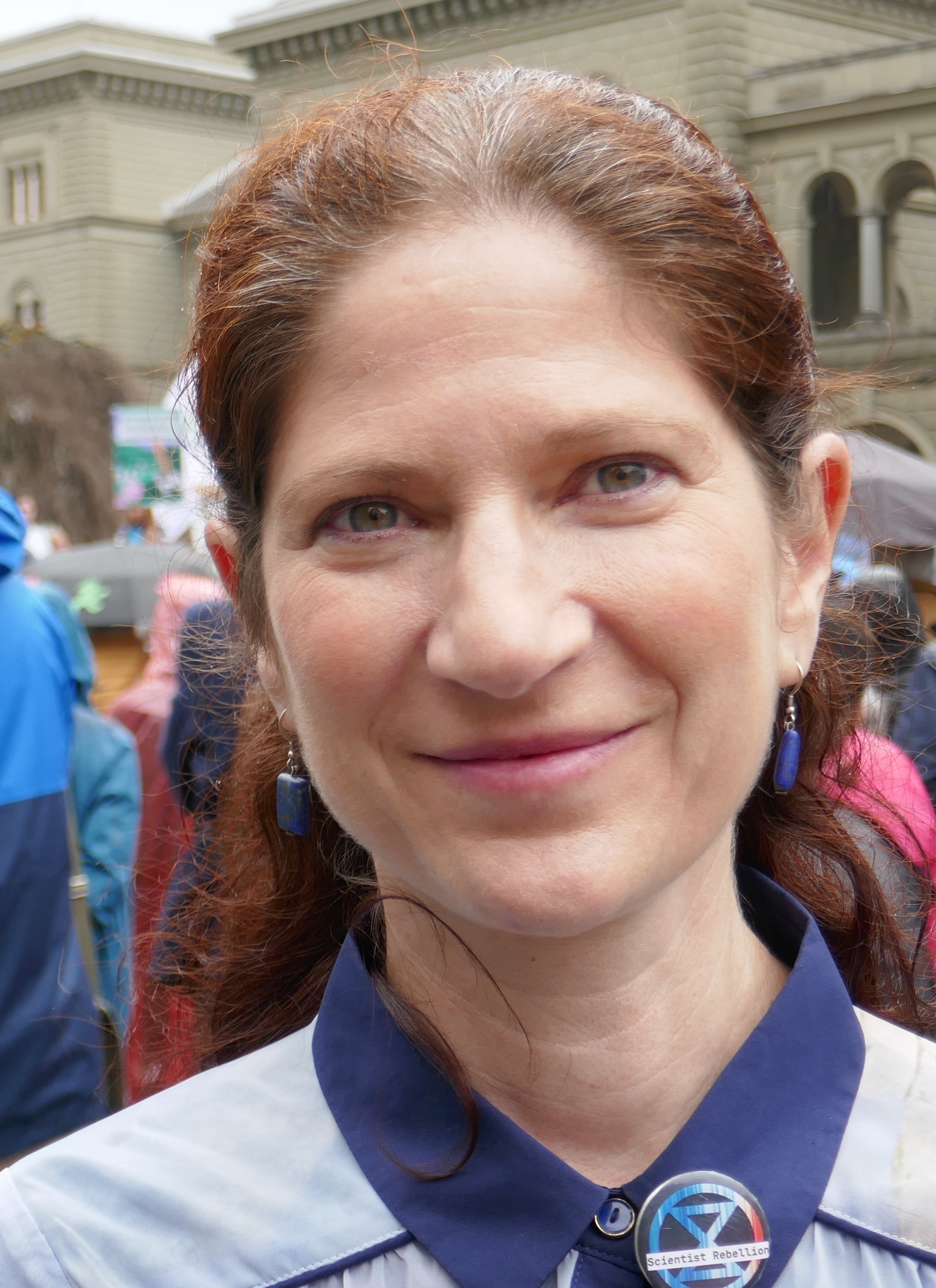
- Steinberger in 2023
- Born: Julia K. Steinberger; 1974 (age 51–52); Geneva
- Education: Collège de Saussure; Brown University (MS); Massachusetts Institute of Technology (PhD)
- Scientific career
- Fields: Social ecology Ecological economics
- Workplaces: University of Leeds; University of Lausanne; University of Zurich; University of Klagenfurt
- Thesis: Progress towards high precision measurements on ultracold metastable hydrogen and trapping deuterium (2004)
- Doctoral advisor: Thomas Greytak; Daniel Kleppner
- Website: profjuliasteinberger.wordpress.com

Julia K. Steinberger (born 1974) is a professor of societal impacts of climate change at the University of Lausanne. She studies the relationship between resource use and societal performance. She is an author of the Intergovernmental Panel on Climate Change (IPCC) Sixth Assessment Report, contributing to the report's discussion of climate change mitigation pathways.

== Education and early life ==
Steinberger is the daughter of Nobel laureate in Physics Jack Steinberger. She is the half-sister of musical instrument and industrial designer Ned Steinberger.

She studied science at the Collège de Saussure in Switzerland, where she was awarded the de Saussure prize in 1993. Steinberger moved to the United States for her graduate degree, working at Brown University on the cosmic microwave background.

She earned her PhD studying ultracold atoms at the Massachusetts Institute of Technology. She worked in the centre for ultracold atoms with Thomas Greytak and Daniel Kleppner, developing new ways to trap ultracold hydrogen and deuterium. During graduate school Steinberger was a member of the MIT Social Justice Cooperative.

== Career and research ==
Steinberger was a postdoctoral fellow in 2006-2007 at the University of Lausanne with Suren Erkman and Dominique Bourgand, then at the University of Zurich working alongside Claudia R. Binder. Steinberger was appointed Senior Researcher at the University of Klagenfurt Institute of Social Ecology in 2007.

She joined the University of Leeds as an associate professor in ecological economics in 2011. She is a member of the Centre for Climate Change Economics and Policy (CCCEP). On 1 August 2020, Steinberger joined the University of Lausanne as a full professor on the social impact of climate change.

Steinberger is a co-investigator of the Engineering and Physical Sciences Research Council (EPSRC)'s iBUILD (Infrastructure BUsiness models, valuation and Innovation for Local Delivery).

Steinberger is the leader of the Leverhulme Trust project "Living Well Within Limits". The project investigates the biophysical requirements of human well-being and the influence of social provisioning on associated resource levels. The project also looks to understand how the world's limited resources could be used to preserve human well-being. To achieve this, Steinberger believes it is necessary to understand what the requirements are for well-being and the context surrounding international inequality.

Her research considers the relationships between the use of resources (energy, materials, and emission of greenhouse gases) and performance of societies (wellbeing and economic output). She is interested in identifying new development pathways toward a low carbon society.

Steinberger has shown that the greenhouse gas emissions of global cities depend on the relation between geophysical and technical factors. She has also investigated the textile chain, food waste, and materials use.

Steinberger has studied how humanity can maintain a good quality of life without damaging the planet. She argues that to achieve the United Nations Sustainable Development Goals, the world must move away from growth and toward an economic model that promotes sustainability and equity. Steinberger and her colleagues visualise the relationship between national performance in several environmental sustainability indicators and social thresholds for a 'good life'. She was one of 238 academics who called for the European Union to limit economic growth and instead promote stability and wellbeing.

In 2020, environmental journalist Roger Harrabin reported on her research on the responsibility of the rich for climate change.

Steinberger supports the work of Greta Thunberg and the School Strike for Climate movement. She was a lead author for Working Group 3 of the Intergovernmental Panel on Climate Change Sixth Assessment Report . She was also a lead author on the urbanisation knowledge module of the International Institute for Applied Systems Analysis Global Energy Assessment. She is on the Future Earth Systems of Sustainable Consumption and Production Knowledge-Action Network's Political Economy Working Group.

In October 2022, Steinberger participated in a road blockage in Bern with the Swiss ecological movement Renovate Switzerland, gluing her hand to the pavement alongside five other people.

Ten weeks into the second Trump presidency, Steinberger wrote in The Guardian that humanity faces unprecedented threats and that "we need an appropriate name for this new era of fossil and tech bros accelerating attacks on democracy and the planet: cataclysm capitalism." She argues that this new phase builds on neoliberalism but is indifferent to a deteriorating economy. Steinberger outlines three cornerstones for a successful resistance: understanding of the destructive powers, collective organising, and strategic positive response action.
