= Robert J. Kolenkow =

American physicist and teacher (b. 1933)

Robert J. Kolenkow (born 1933) is an American physicist and teacher. He is best known for being the coauthor, along with Daniel Kleppner, of a popular undergraduate physics textbook, An Introduction to Mechanics.

Kolenkow did his undergraduate work at the Massachusetts Institute of Technology, graduating in 1955. For a time, he was an associate professor of physics at MIT. His departure in 1971 generated some controversy on campus; he was regarded as an excellent teacher by his students, however, the administration was viewed as being more concerned about research than education when making its tenure decisions.

Kolenkow became a professor at Carleton College in Northfield, Minnesota. He also co-authored a textbook on physical geography which was favorably reviewed.

== Books ==
- Kleppner, Daniel; Robert Kolenkow (1973). An Introduction to Mechanics. New York: McGraw-Hill. p. 546 pp. ISBN 0-07-035048-5. Kleppner, Daniel; Kolenkow, Robert (2014). 2014 2nd edition. Cambridge University Press. ISBN 978-0-521-19811-0.
- Muller, Robert A.; Robert J. Kolenkow; Theodore Oberlander (1978). Physical Geography Today: A Portrait of a Planet. New York: Random House. ISBN 0-394-32088-3.
