= Lancy-Pont-Rouge railway station =

Railway station in Lancy, Switzerland

Lancy-Pont-Rouge
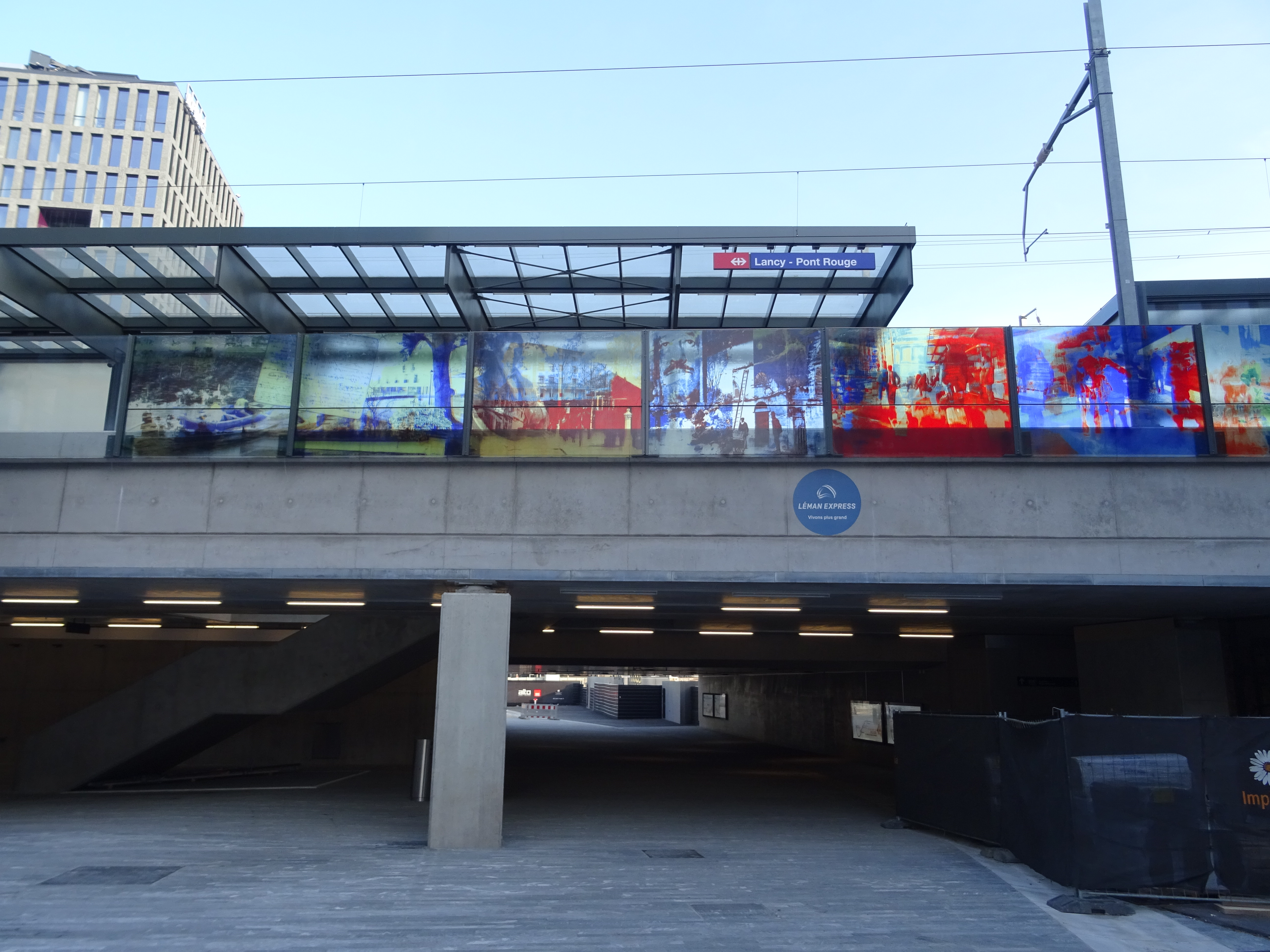
- The station platforms in 2020

General information
- Location: Lancy; Switzerland
- Coordinates: 46°11′09″N 6°07′30″E
- Elevation: 385 m (1,263 ft)
- Owner: Swiss Federal Railways
- Line: CEVA
- Distance: 63.9 km (39.7 mi) from Lausanne
- Platforms: 2 (1 island platform)
- Tracks: 2
- Train operators: Swiss Federal Railways
- Connections: tpg : gare, gare/Etoile
- Tram: Tram lines and
- Bus: bus lines

Construction
- Parking: Yes
- Cycle facilities: Yes (1284 spaces)
- Accessible: Yes

Other information
- Station code: 8516155 (LAPR)
- Fare zone: 10 (unireso)

History
- Opened: 16 December 2002
- Rebuilt: 10 December 2017

Passengers
- 2023: 9'400 per weekday (SBB)

Services
Preceding station	SBB CFF FFS	Following station
Genève-Cornavin towards St-Maurice or Martigny	RE33	Lancy-Bachet towards Annemasse
Preceding station	Léman Express	Following station
Genève-Cornavin towards Coppet	L1	Lancy-Bachet towards Évian-les-Bains
Genève-Cornavin towards Coppet	L2	Lancy-Bachet towards Annecy
Genève-Cornavin towards Coppet	L3	Lancy-Bachet towards Saint-Gervais
Genève-Cornavin towards Coppet	L4	Lancy-Bachet towards Annemasse
Terminus	L7	Lancy-Bachet towards Annemasse
Geneva Airport Terminus	L7	Lancy-Bachet towards Annemasse
Vernier Terminus	L7	Lancy-Bachet towards Annemasse
Location
- Location within Switzerland Location within Canton of Geneva

Lancy-Pont-Rouge railway station (French: Gare de Lancy-Pont-Rouge) is a railway station in the municipality of Lancy, in the Swiss canton of Geneva. It is an intermediate stop on the standard gauge CEVA orbital railway line of Swiss Federal Railways. The current station opened in 2017, replacing a temporary station that opened in 2002.

== Services ==
As of the December 2024 timetable change, the following services stop at Lancy-Pont-Rouge:

- RegioExpress: half-hourly service (hourly on weekends) between Annemasse and St-Maurice and hourly service from St-Maurice to Martigny (only on weekdays)
- Léman Express:
  - L1 / L2 / L3 / L4: service every fifteen minutes between Coppet and Annemasse; from Annemasse every hour to Annecy, half-hourly or hourly service or service every two hours to Évian-les-Bains and every two hours to Saint-Gervais-les-Bains-Le Fayet
  - L7: additional services to Annemasse, some services to Geneva Airport or Vernier
