= Institut International de Lancy =

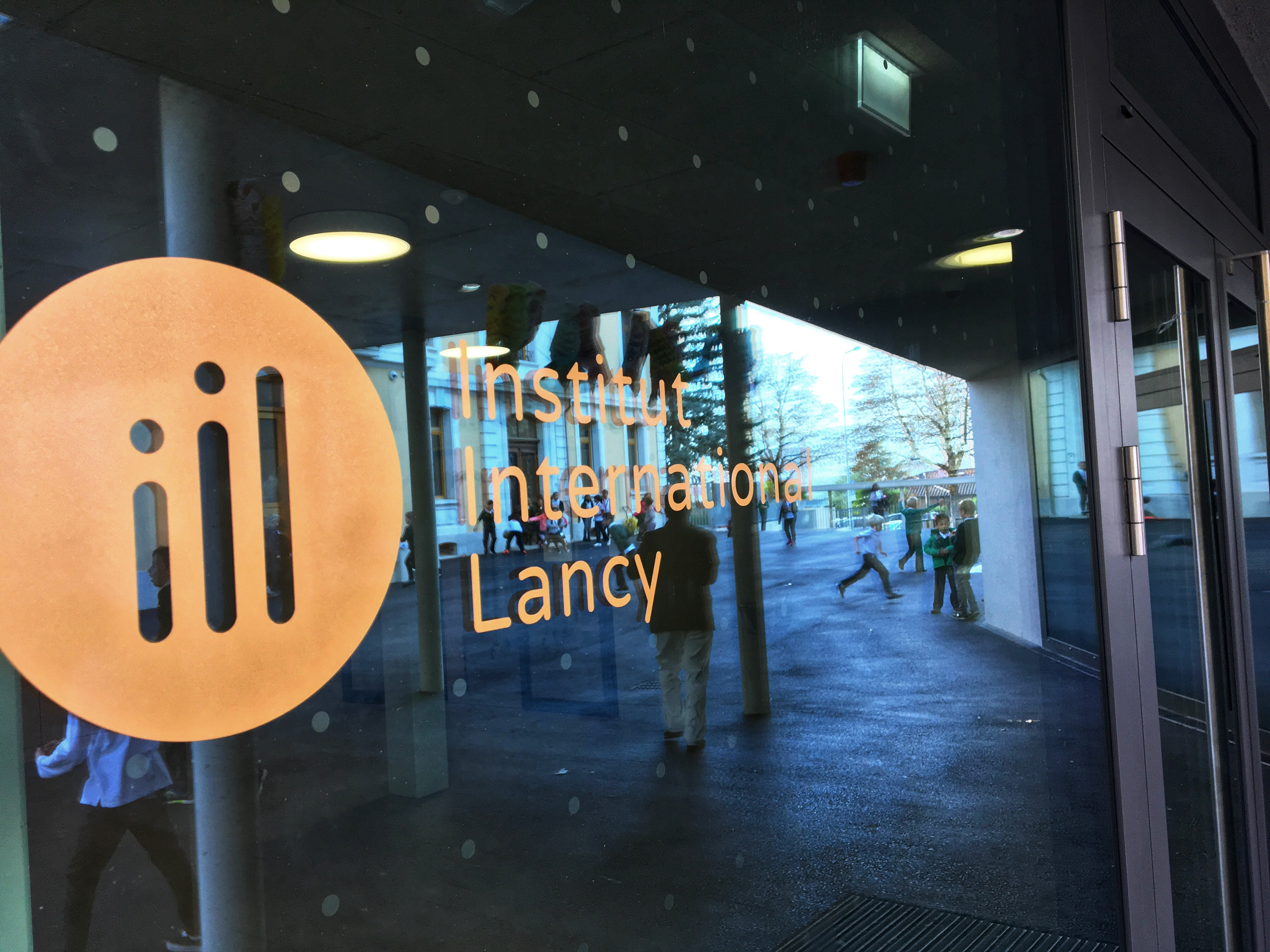

Location
- Grand-Lancy, Genève; Switzerland
- 46.1815°N 6.1228°E

Information
- Former names: Collège Marie-Thérèse
- Type: International School
- Mottoes: Work and succeed together
- Established: 1903
- Director: Monique Roiné
- Enrollment: 1,400
- Accreditations: International Baccalaureate Cambridge Assessment International Education
- Website: www.iil.ch

Institut International de Lancy (IIL) is a private international school located in Lancy, Geneva. It has Bilingual, French, and English programmes for students from 3 to 19 years old.

== History ==
Collège Marie-Thérèse was founded in 1903 soon after a law in France prohibited religious congregations of any persuasion. In its early years the Collège was attended by approximately sixty girls, mainly boarders, from across Europe. The 1950s and 1960s were a period of expansion for the school resulting in several major changes: co-education was introduced throughout the school, and the curriculum was modified in order to provide pupils with a more personal curriculum at the higher secondary level. In April 2001, the name of the school was changed to Institut International de Lancy. An English-language primary section was created the same year; an English-language secondary section followed in 2005. IIL became an IB World School in 2007. The school opened a bilingual section in 2017. Since the start of 2020–2021 school year, IIL has put in place the Kiva and anti-bullying programme for all students and staff. IIL is the first school in Switzerland to join the programme. The English Primary and Secondary sections were accredited by NEASC in 2026.

== Curriculum ==
The school follows a curriculum of core and foundation subjects within a structure that follows the English National Curriculum in the English sections and in the French sections, the Baccalauréat en France. Students in the English Secondary are prepared for IGCSE exams and the IB Diploma Programme
