= Daniel Kleppner =

American physicist (1932–2025)

Professor Daniel Kleppner
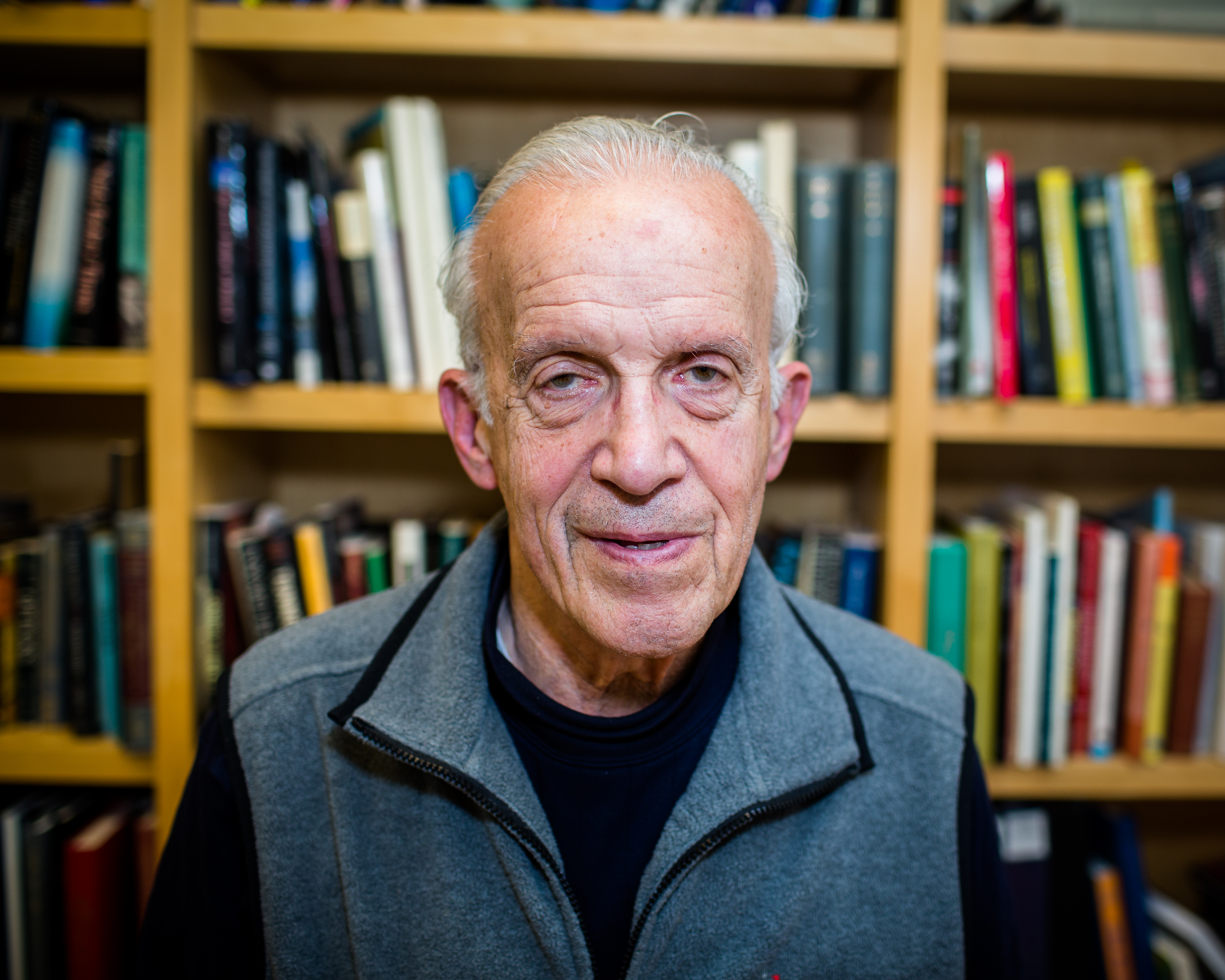
- in his MIT office October 2016
- Born: December 16, 1932; New York City, U.S.
- Died: June 16, 2025 (aged 92); Palo Alto, California, U.S.
- Education: Williams College (BA); University of Cambridge; Harvard University (PhD)
- Known for: Hydrogen maser
- Spouse: Beatrice Spencer (m. 1958)
- Children: 3
- Awards: Lilienfeld Prize (1991); MIT Killian Award (1995-96); Oersted Medal (1997); Wolf Prize in Physics (2005); National Medal of Science (2006); Frederic Ives Medal (2007); Franklin Institute Award (2014); APS Medal for Exceptional; Achievement in Research (2017)
- Scientific career
- Fields: AMO physics
- Workplaces: MIT
- Thesis: The Broken Beam Resonance Experiment (1959)
- Doctoral advisor: Norman Ramsey
- Doctoral students: David E. Pritchard; William Daniel Phillips; Julia Steinberger
- Website: physics.mit.edu/faculty/daniel-kleppner/

Daniel Kleppner (December 16, 1932 – June 16, 2025) was an American physicist who was the Lester Wolfe Professor Emeritus of Physics at Massachusetts Institute of Technology (MIT) and co-founder and co-director of the MIT-Harvard Center for Ultracold Atoms. His areas of science included atomic, molecular, and optical physics, and his research interests included experimental atomic physics, laser spectroscopy, and high precision measurements.

Working with Norman Ramsey Jr., he helped create the first hydrogen maser in 1960.

Together with Robert J. Kolenkow, he authored a popular textbook An Introduction to Mechanics for advanced students.

== Early life ==
Kleppner was born in New York City on December 16, 1932, and grew up in nearby New Rochelle, New York. His father was Otto Kleppner, founder of an advertising agency.

== Education and career ==
Kleppner graduated from Williams College with a B.A. in 1953 in Williamstown, Massachusetts. He also attended Cambridge University in England with a B.A. in 1955, and Harvard University, he attended the Harvard Graduate School of Arts and Sciences, with a Ph.D. in 1959.

In the 1950s, Kleppner became a physics doctoral student at Harvard University, where he worked under Norman Ramsey. Here, Kleppner took the concepts behind an ammonia maser and applied them to a hydrogen maser, which became his Ph.D. thesis. This enabled the development of more precise atomic clocks. Kleppner did important research into Rydberg atoms, which enabled development of the neutral atom quantum computer.

Later, he became interested in creating a hydrogen Bose–Einstein condensate (BEC). In 1995, a group of researchers, including Kleppner's former students, made a BEC using rubidium atoms. It was not until 1998 that Kleppner and Tom Greytak finally created a hydrogen BEC. The advancements in cooling technology needed to achieve this contributed to even more precise atomic clocks. Kleppner went on to become one of the founders of a MIT-Harvard joint research lab, the Center for Ultracold Atoms.

== Personal life and death ==
Kleppner married Beatrice Spencer in 1958, and they had three children. They were longtime residents of Belmont, Massachusetts. After falling ill while visiting family in California, Kleppner died at a hospital in Palo Alto on June 16, 2025, at the age of 92.

== Honors and awards ==
Kleppner was the recipient of many awards including

- 1991 Lilienfeld Prize,
- 1991 William F. Meggers Award,
- 1997 Oersted Medal,
- 2005 Wolf Prize in Physics,
- 2006 National Medal of Science
- 2007 Frederic Ives Medal,
- 2014 Benjamin Franklin Medal, and
- 2017 American Physical Society Medal for Exceptional Achievement in Research.

Within MIT he won the institute's prestigious James R. Killian, Jr. Faculty Achievement Award, conferring him the title of Killian Award Lecturer for 1995-1996.

He was elected the American Academy of Arts and Sciences in 1986, a Fellow of OSA in 1992, the French Academy of Sciences in 2004, and the American Philosophical Society in 2007.

== Books ==
Kleppner and Robert J. Kolenkow wrote An Introduction to Mechanics in 1973. 40 years later, Kleppner and Kolenkow returned to edit and publish a second edition in 2013.

- Kleppner, Daniel; Robert J. Kolenkow (1973). An Introduction to Mechanics. New York: McGraw-Hill. ISBN 978-0-07-035048-9.
- Kleppner, Daniel (2013). An Introduction to Mechanics (1st ed.). Cambridge. ISBN 9780511784118.
- Kleppner, Daniel (2013). An Introduction to Mechanics (2nd ed.). Cambridge. ISBN 9780521198110.

Kleppner and his thesis adviser (and Nobel laureate) Norman Ramsey wrote the text Quick Calculus, joined for the 3rd edition by MIT professor Peter Dourmashkin:

- Kleppner, Daniel; Ramsey, Norman (1972). Quick calculus: for self-study or classroom use (1st ed.). New York: Wiley. ISBN 9780471491125.
- Kleppner, Daniel; Ramsey, Norman (1985). Quick Calculus: a self-teaching guide (2nd ed.). New York, NY: Wiley. ISBN 0471827223.
- Kleppner, Daniel; Dourmashkin, Peter; Ramsey, Norman (April 8, 2022). Quick Calculus: A Self-Teaching Guide (3rd ed.). Jossey-Bass. ISBN 978-1-119-74319-4.

== Selected publications ==
- Thomas J. Greytak; Daniel Kleppner (2001). "Bose-Einstein Condensation". McGraw-Hill Yearbook of Science and Technology: 64–67.
- D. G. Fried; T. C. Killian; L. Willmann; D. Landhuis; S. C. Moss; D. Kleppner; T. J. Greytak (1998). "Bose-Einstein Condensation of Atomic Hydrogen". Physical Review Letters. 81 (18): 3811. arXiv:physics/9809017. Bibcode:1998PhRvL..81.3811F. doi:10.1103/PhysRevLett.81.3811. S2CID 3174641.
- T. C. Killian; D. G. Fried; L. Willmann; D. Landhuis; S. C. Moss; T. J. Greytak; D. Kleppner (1998). "Cold Collision Frequency Shift of the 1S-2S Transition in Hydrogen". Physical Review Letters. 81 (18): 3807. arXiv:physics/9809016. Bibcode:1998PhRvL..81.3807K. doi:10.1103/PhysRevLett.81.3807. S2CID 18665492.
- C. L. Cesar; D. G. Fried; T. C. Killian; A. D. Polcyn; J. C. Sandberg; I. A. Yu; T. J. Greytak; D. Kleppner (1996). "Two-Photon Spectroscopy of Trapped Atomic Hydrogen". Physical Review Letters. 77 (2): 255–258. Bibcode:1996PhRvL..77..255C. doi:10.1103/PhysRevLett.77.255. hdl:1721.1/11193. PMID 10062405.
- T. C. Killian; D. G. Fried; C. L. Cesar; A. D. Polycn; T. J. Greytak; D. Kleppner (1996). "Doppler-Free Spectroscopy of Trapped Atomic Hydrogen". Proceedings of the 15th International Conference on Atomic Physics.
