= Trams in Geneva =

Geneva suburban tram system

Coordinates: 46°12′37″N 6°8′36″E

Geneva tramway
- Logo of Geneva Public Transport

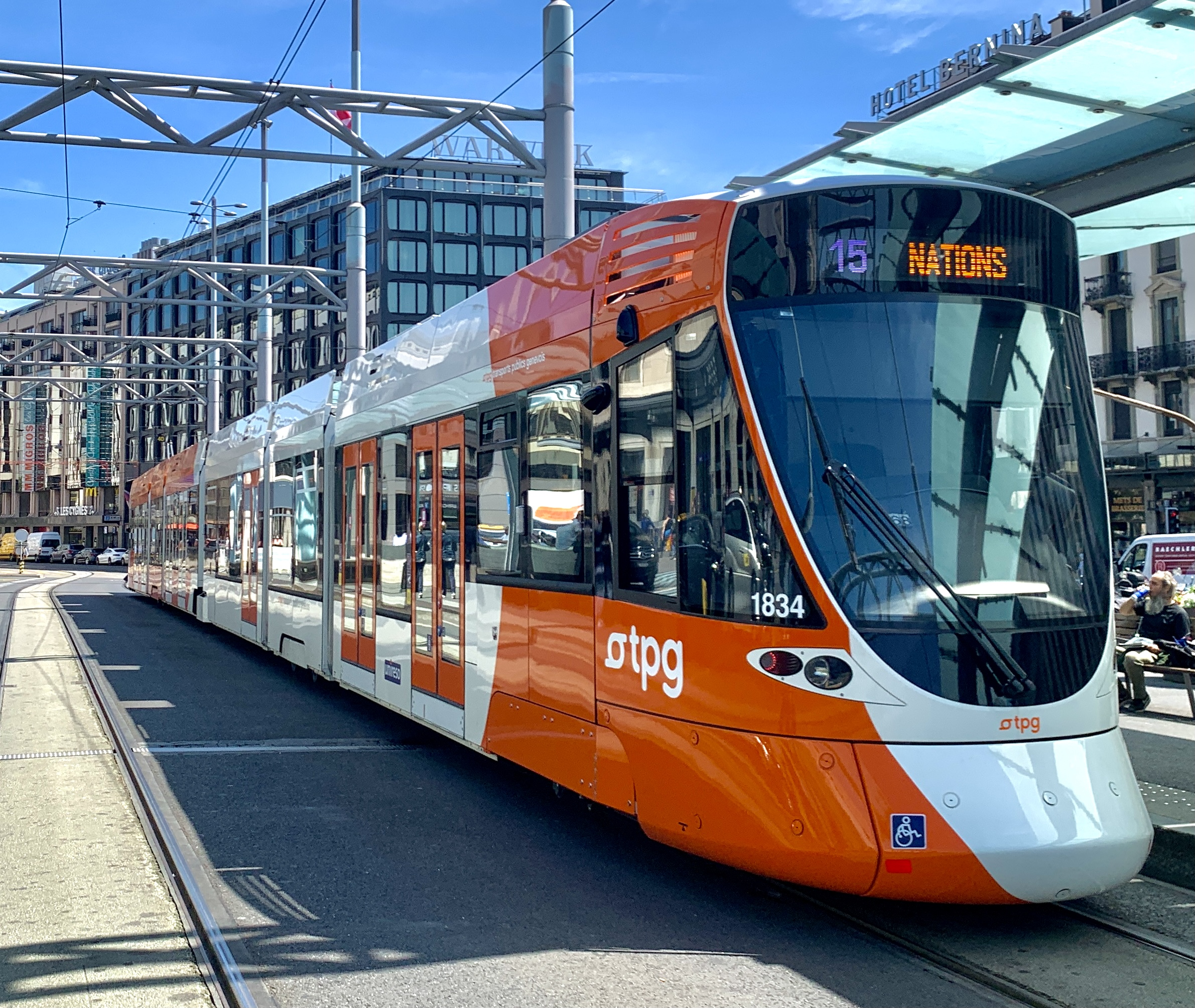
- Be 6/10 series tram at Geneva Station

Overview
- Locale: Geneva and Annemasse
- Transit type: Tram
- Number of lines: 5
- Number of stations: 135
- Annual ridership: 102.797 million (2024)

Operation
- Began operation: June 1862, 19; 164 years ago
- Operator: Geneva Public Transport

Technical
- System length: 55.91 km (34.74 mi)
- Track gauge: 1,000 mm (3 ft 3 3/8 in) metre gauge
- Electrification: Overhead line, 600 V DC
System map
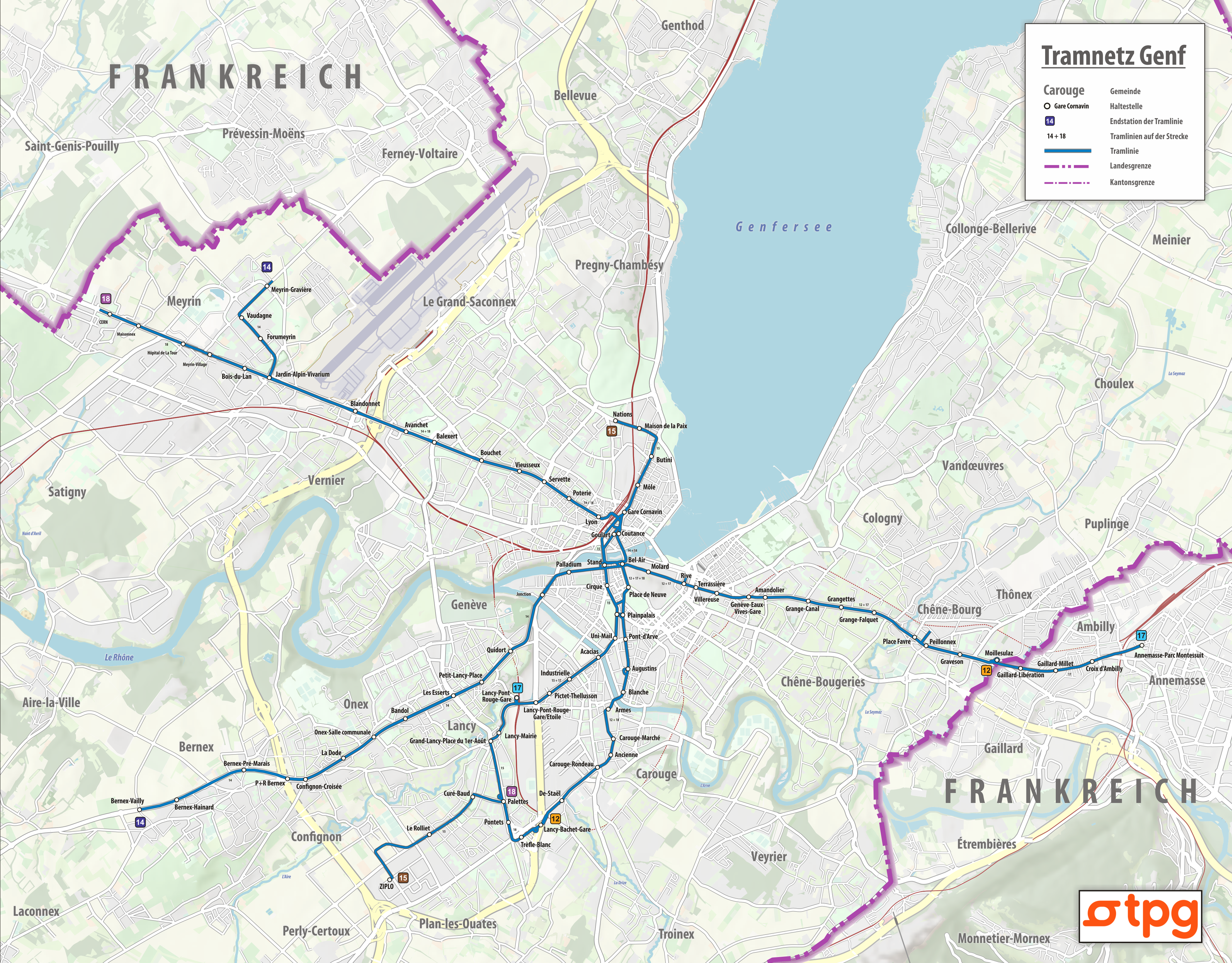
Map of the network in 2025

The Geneva tramway (French: Tramway de Genève) is a network of tramways forming the core element of the public transport system in Geneva, Switzerland. It is operated by Transports Publics Genevois (TPG), and is supplemented by the Geneva trolleybus system and the Geneva bus system.

Opened in 1862, the network had grown sufficiently by 1920 to serve large parts of the surrounding countryside. However, by 1960 it had contracted to just one line. Since 1995, it has been greatly expanded. It presently has five tram lines, and further expansions are planned. The network extends into France, with line 17 going to Annemasse, making Geneva one of the only cities in the world with a tram system that crosses an international border (the only others being Strasbourg, between France and Germany, and Basel, between France, Germany and Switzerland).

== History ==
=== Rise and fall (1862–1976) ===
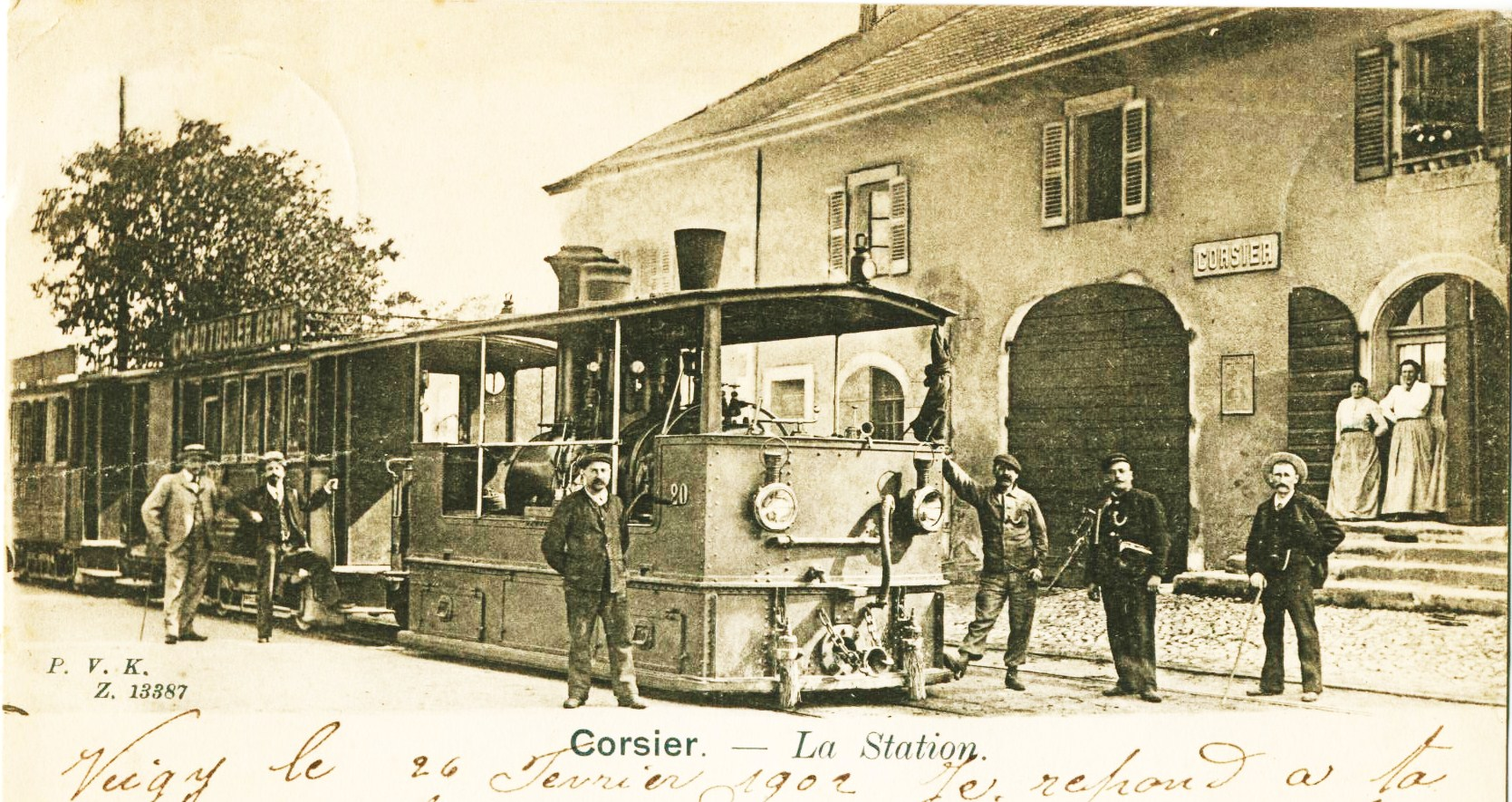
A steam tram in Corsier, ca. 1900.

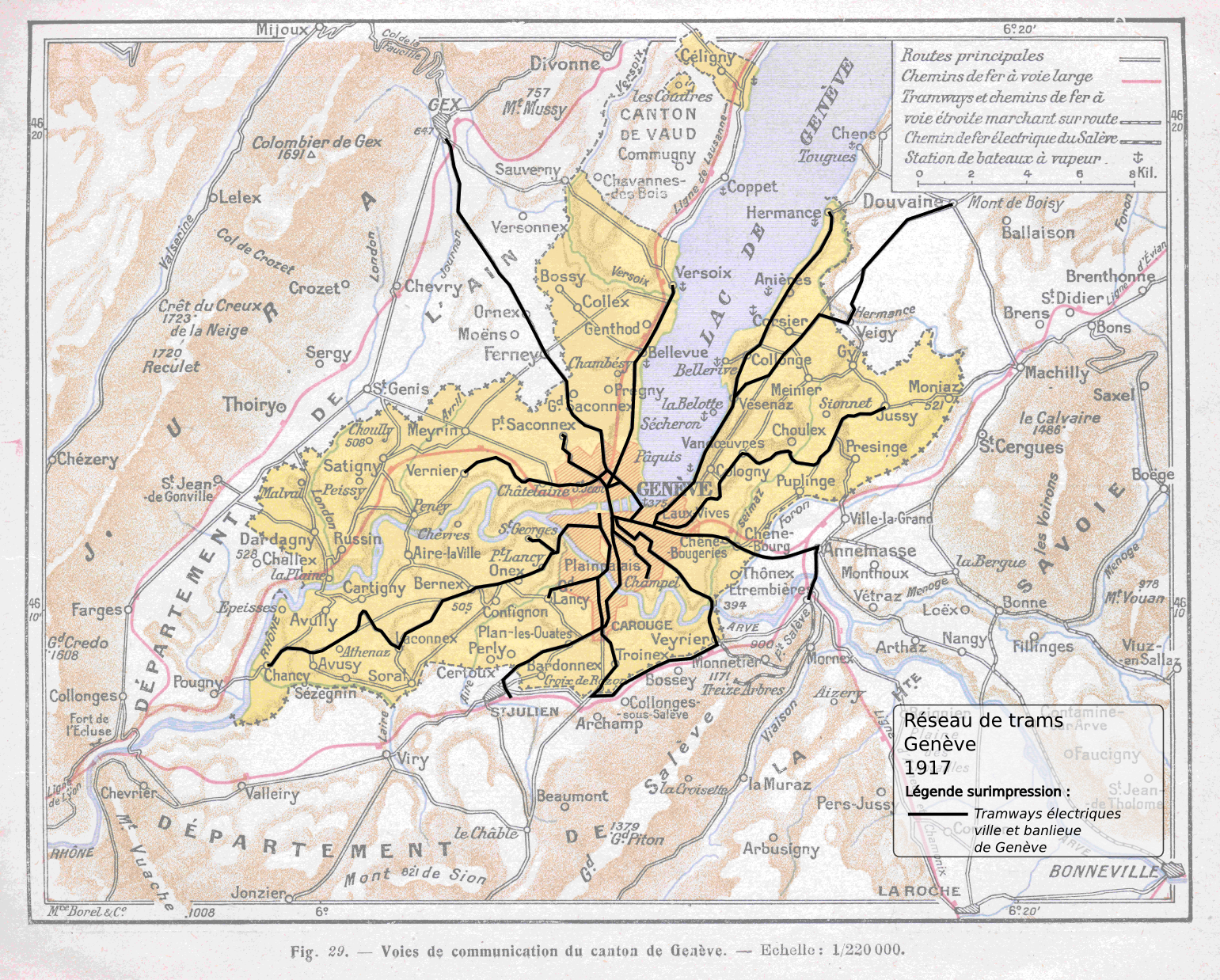
A plan of the network in 1917.

Geneva's and Switzerland's first trams ran on 19 June 1862, with the opening of a horsecar tramway between Place Neuve and Carouge. In 1889, a steam tramway was opened, and in 1894 Geneva's first electric tram entered service. Finally, in 1899, the Compagnie Genevoise des Tramways Électriques (CGTE), predecessor of the TPG, was inaugurated.

The CGTE set itself the goal of unifying the various systems. All lines were electrified and converted to a uniform metre gauge.

For nearly three months in 1904, the CGTE also operated the steepest adhesion railway in Switzerland. The incline reached 11.8%, but the dangers posed by such steep inclines brought about the swift demise of this line.

In the 1920s, the city and the canton had a large network of urban and suburban tramways. As of 1923, 120 km (75 mi) of tramways had been built. The network extended into the countryside, and even across the border into France.

In 1925, the CGTE began to convert its interurban lines to bus operation. This process continued in the city centre, where the lines were partly replaced by trolleybuses. By 1969, the network had shrunk to just one 8 km (5.0 mi) long tramway, which was served by line 12 (Moillesulaz–Carouge). The good technical condition of the tramcars and the fact that they had not yet been written off, led to the provisional retention of the last tramway.

In the 1970s, concepts were developed to connect the relatively large suburban communities of Meyrin and Onex to the remaining tramway once again, with an appropriately modern light railway. However, all of these ideas, and also the investments necessary for the maintenance of the remaining infrastructure in the medium term, exceeded the abilities of the privately owned CGTE. A popular initiative demanding the nationalization of the CGTE was then adopted, and on 1 January 1977 the CGTE was transformed into the TPG, an autonomous government agency of the canton of Geneva.

=== Renaissance (1977–1992) ===
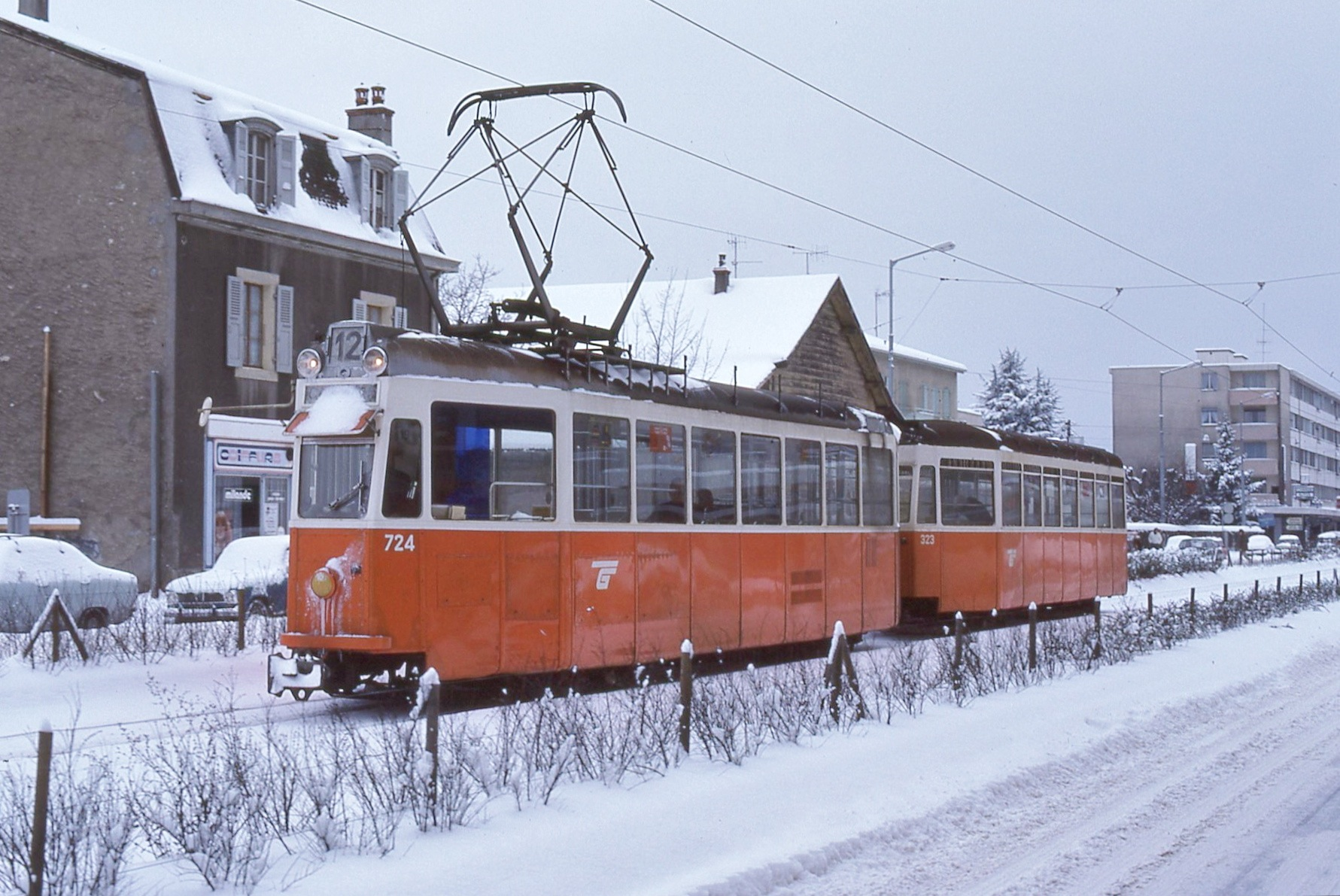
SWP motor car 724, and trailer 323, on Rue de Genève, 1980s.

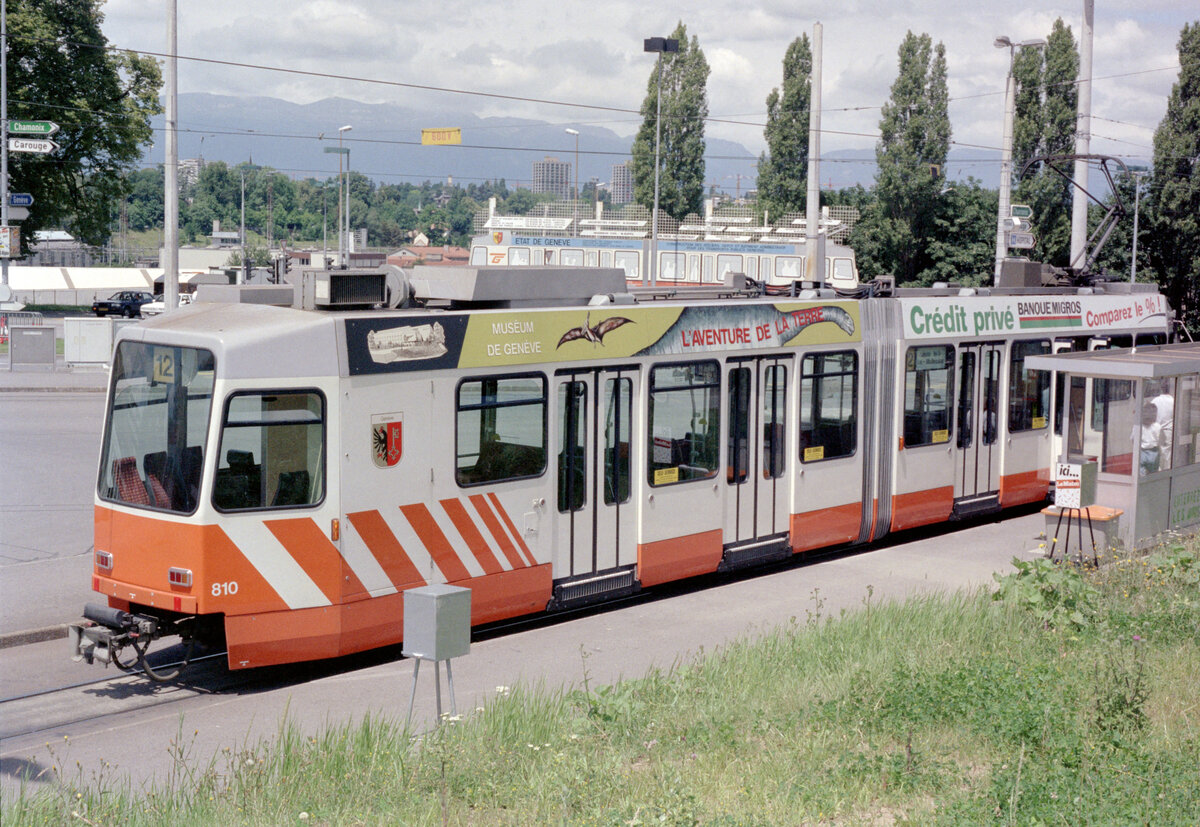
A "DAV" tram, 1990.

In 1978, the tracks of the last remaining tramway were renewed under the auspices of the "new" TPG. Planning of the proposed new lines was addressed. However, it was only on 12 June 1988, with the adoption of a new cantonal law about public transport, that the first concrete building proposals were presented. From 1995, these proposals then became the basis of larger network extensions.

By that time, the most pressing modernisation of existing operations had already occurred. In 1984, in Bachet-de-Pesay in the municipality of Lancy, construction work had begun on the new Bachet tram depot. To connect the new facility with the existing network, the route of line 12 was extended on 27 September 1987 by one kilometre (0.6 mi) from Carouge to Bachet. The sidings and maintenance facility in Bachet were opened in 1988, and in 1990 the associated tram and trackwork construction workshop was commissioned. Finally, in 1992, the new administration building was opened. Since then, it has been the headquarters of the TPG.

In 1987–1989, the TPG procured 45 new, partly low floor, articulated trams, based on the prototype Be 4/6 tram no. 741, which had joined the TPG fleet in 1984. The new trams were supplied by Ateliers de Constructions Mécaniques de Vevey (ACMV) in Villeneuve, Vaud, in collaboration with Duewag and BBC / ABB. The colloquial expression "DAV", which is used to denote these vehicles, is an acronym for Düwag - Ateliers de Vevey. These "DAV" trams have a suspended articulation. Following this new procurement, TPG's existing fleet of old trams could be completely withdrawn, as future network expansion, including the introduction of new lines 13 and 16, had already been taken into account when the order for the new trams was placed.

=== Network expansion (1992–2006) ===
Development of the tramway network between 1992 and 2012.

In 1988, a referendum on the proposed new network expansion projects was unsuccessful. The first phase of development of the network therefore became the construction of a central Plainpalais–Carouge–Bachet–Palettes–Acacias–Plainpalais ring link, and the crossing of the Rhône to the Genève-Cornavin railway station, with a continuation to the Place des Nations and United Nations Office at Geneva.

On 28 May 1995, line 13 (Cornavin–Bachet) was opened, and trams returned to the other side of the Rhône. On 28 June 1997, line 13 was extended from Bachet to Palettes and on 28 March 1998, line 16 (Moillesulaz–Cornavin) was put into operation. On 14 December 2003, line 13 was extended from Cornavin to Nations.

The following year, on 11 December 2004, line 15 entered service; it ran on a new route from Lancy-Pont-Rouge via Acacias to Plainpalais, and continued from there via Cornavin station to Nations. From 10 December 2005, this new section was also served by line 17, which ran from Plainpalais to Eaux-Vives station.

Due to the increased need for rolling stock resulting from the network expansions after 2000, more trams were procured. Initially, the TPG ordered 21 Flexity Outlook Cityrunners from Bombardier Transportation for delivery in 2004-2005, with an option on another 17 vehicles; the option was exercised at the end of 2007.

On 13 May 2006, upon the entry into service of a new section between Palettes and Lancy-Pont-Rouge, the ring link was completed, and with it the first phase of the network's expansion. The new ring link section facilitated the extension of line 15 and line 17 to Palettes and Bachet, respectively. From the day the ring link was completed, the four tram lines operating on it, lines 12, 13, 15 and 17, no longer terminated there, but changed their numbers at designated stops: line 12 became line 17 at the Bachet stop, and line 13 became line 15 at the Palettes stop. In 2009, there was another alteration in the way the lines serviced the ring link: line 12 began switching to line 15 at the Palettes stop, line 13 started to reverse at the Palettes loop and line 17 was redirected to turn around at the Lancy-Pont-Rouge loop.

=== TCMC and TCOB construction (2007–2011) ===
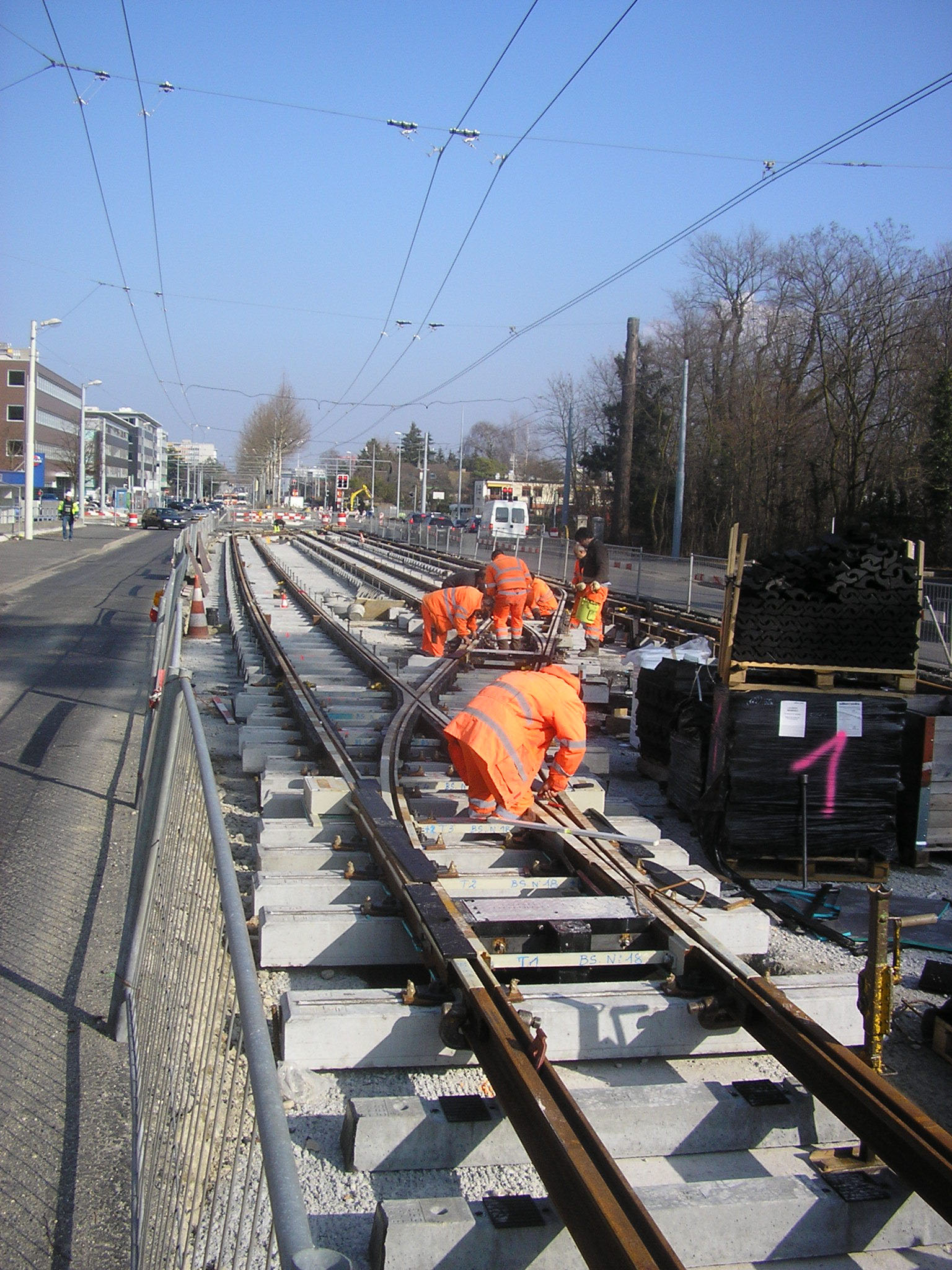
TCOB track construction site in Onex, February 2011.

The next network expansion phases included the Tram Cornavin–Meyrin–CERN (TCMC) project, the construction of which began in early 2006, and the Tram Cornavin–Onex–Bernex (TCOB), for which the Swiss Federal Council awarded the concession in January 2007.

The first section of the TCMC, between Cornavin and Avanchet, was opened on 8 December 2007. Initially, it formed part of the extended line 16 (Moillesulaz–Avanchet) and the new line 14 (Bachet–Avanchet). On same date, line 17 was extended, from Eaux-Vives station to the disused Chêne-Bourg station, and thus revived scheduled services on the short local branch line, including its terminal loop, after a long absence.

The first TCMC section was built in a double track configuration. However, the absence of any balloon loop at the provisional terminus at Avanchet, or at the permanent termini at Meyrin–Gravière and CERN, as well as the inclusion on this section of several stations with island platforms, made necessary the exclusive use of bidirectional vehicles to run services on the section. As the numbers of the Flexity Outlook trams in the fleet were then rather limited, the TPG exercised its existing option for 17 more vehicles, while in the meantime the previous through-connection of line 12 with line 16 at the Moillesulaz terminus had to be suspended.

According to various sources, the opening of the second stage of the TCMC (Avanchet–Meyrin) took place on 12 December 2009, with the entry into service of the section to Meyrin (Gravière). On 30 April 2011, operations commenced on the section to CERN.

The TCOB route to Bernex P+R, which includes, amongst other things, a second crossing of the Rhône, went into service at the end of 2011. The first – very short – section of this route, between Coutance and Genève-Cornavin station, had already commenced operations at the timetable change in December 2010. A new line 18 ran on the route, and was extended to CERN in May 2011.

For the inauguration of the TCOB route, the TPG ordered 32 Tango trams, made by the Swiss company Stadler Rail. Like the Cityrunners, the Tango trams are bidirectional.

After the new route to Bernex P+R was commissioned, the network was simplified. There are now only four tram lines, nos. 12, 14, 15 and 18. The use of the previous lines 13, 16 and 17 were discontinued, and only one line now operates on most section of track. Although these changes simplify tram operations, they also mean that points on the inner city sections, and in particular Genève-Cornavin station, can no longer be reached from all parts of the network (e.g. Genève-Cornavin is no longer directly served by line 12) without the need to change trams en route.

=== Annemasse extensions (2019-2026) ===
On 15 December 2019, the network once again became cross-border with the opening of tracks connecting the terminus of line 12, at Moillesulaz, to Annemasse. To mark this, line 17 was launched, running between Lancy-Pont-Rouge station and Annemasse and largely following the same route as line 12. The line had four stops within Annemasse beyond the border stop at Moillesulaz. At that time, the line terminated at Parc Montessuit in Annemasse. Its introduction coincided with the launch of the Léman Express, a cross-border rapid transit network.

On 17 October 2026, service started on an extension of the international line 17 within Annemasse, France. The 1.2 km (0.75 mi) extension gave the line three new stops at Place Deffaugt, Henri-Barbusse and Perrier-Aubrac. The new terminus, Perrier-Aubrac, would be near a planned Park & Ride facility to hold 200 cars and 70 bicycles. Both France and Switzerland financed the €63 million cost of the extension.

== Lines ==
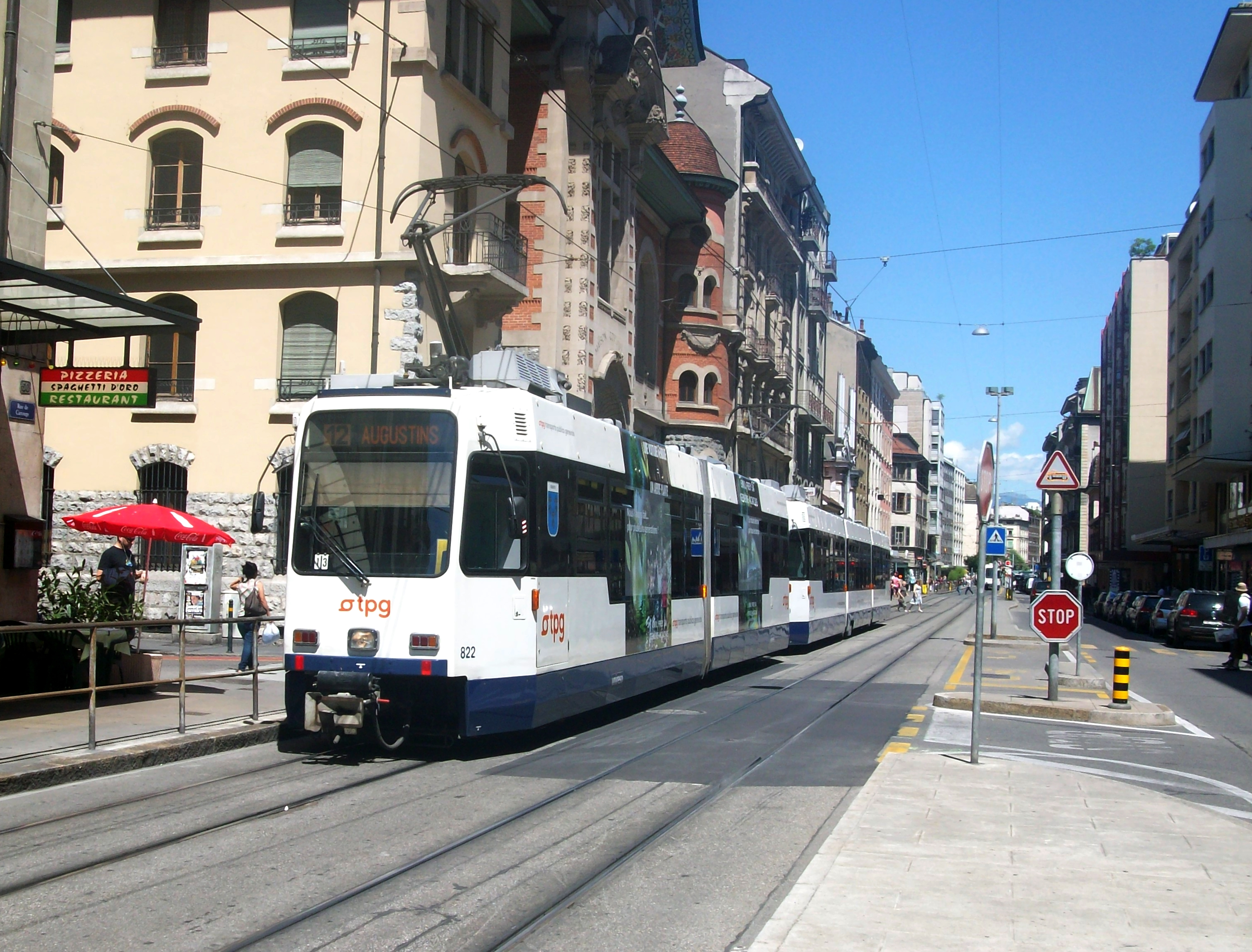
Duewag-Vevey Be 4/6 tram no. 822 operating line 12, July 2012.

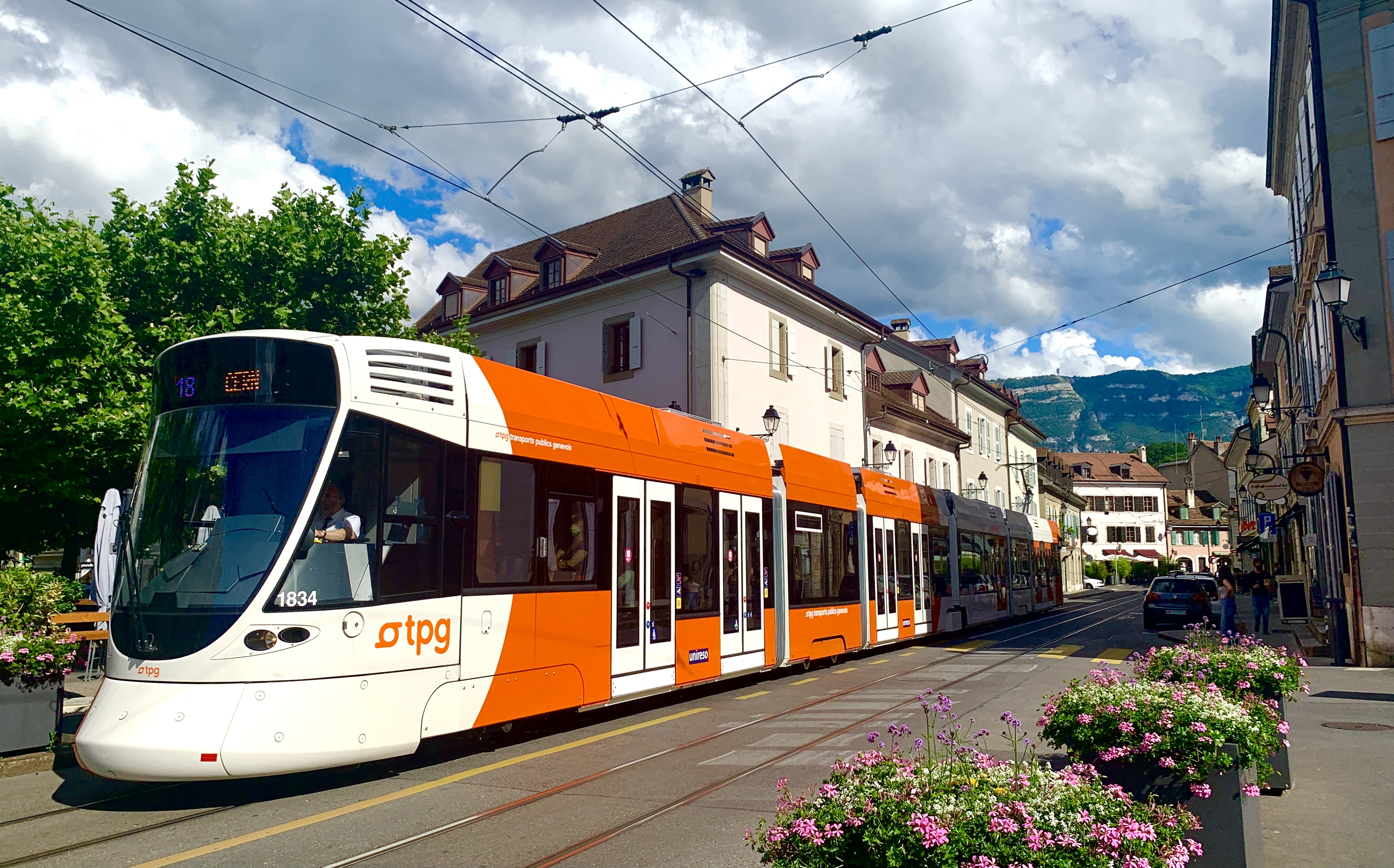
The Stadler "Tango" tram in Carouge

Line	Route	Year opened	Present route since	Places served	Stops
Trams in Geneva	Lancy-Bachet, gare ↔ Thônex, Moillesulaz	1862 (Note: Line 12: opened on 19 June 1862 as a line from Place Neuve to Rondeau de Carouge.)	2018	Lancy-Bachet, gare – Carouge – Plainpalais – Bel-Air – Rive – Moillesulaz	25
Trams in Geneva	Bernex, Vailly ↔ Meyrin, Gravière	2007	2021	Bernex – Confignon – Onex – Petit-Lancy – Stand – Gare Cornavin – Avanchets – Meyrin	30
Trams in Geneva	Plan-les-Ouates, ZIPLO ↔ Genève, Nations	2003	2023	ZIPLO – Palettes – Grand-Lancy – Acacias – Plainpalais – Stand – Gare Cornavin – Nations	23
Trams in Geneva	Lancy-Pont-Rouge, gare ↔ Annemasse, Perrier-Aubrac	2019	2026	Lancy-Pont-Rouge, gare – Acacias – Plainpalais – Bel-Air – Rive – Moillesulaz – Annemasse	29
Trams in Geneva	Grand-Lancy, Palettes ↔ Meyrin, CERN	2012	2022	Palettes – Lancy-Bachet, gare – Carouge – Plainpalais – Bel-Air – Gare Cornavin – Avanchets – CERN	31

Interchange stations, which enable transfers between the lines, are located at the following stops:

- Genève-Cornavin railway station
- Genève, Bel-Air
- Genève, Stand
- Genève, Plainpalais

== Projects ==
One extension is currently under construction:

- Line 15 (future line 13) between Place des Nations and Ferney-Voltaire via Le Grand-Saconnex. Commissioning of this line is planned for 2028.

A cross-border extension of line 15 towards Saint-Julien-en-Genevois via Plan-les-Ouates started construction and has been finished up to Plan-les-Ouates. Construction from Plan-les-Ouates to Saint-Julien was supposed to start in 2023, but has been halted due to appeals and political opposition.

== Fleet ==
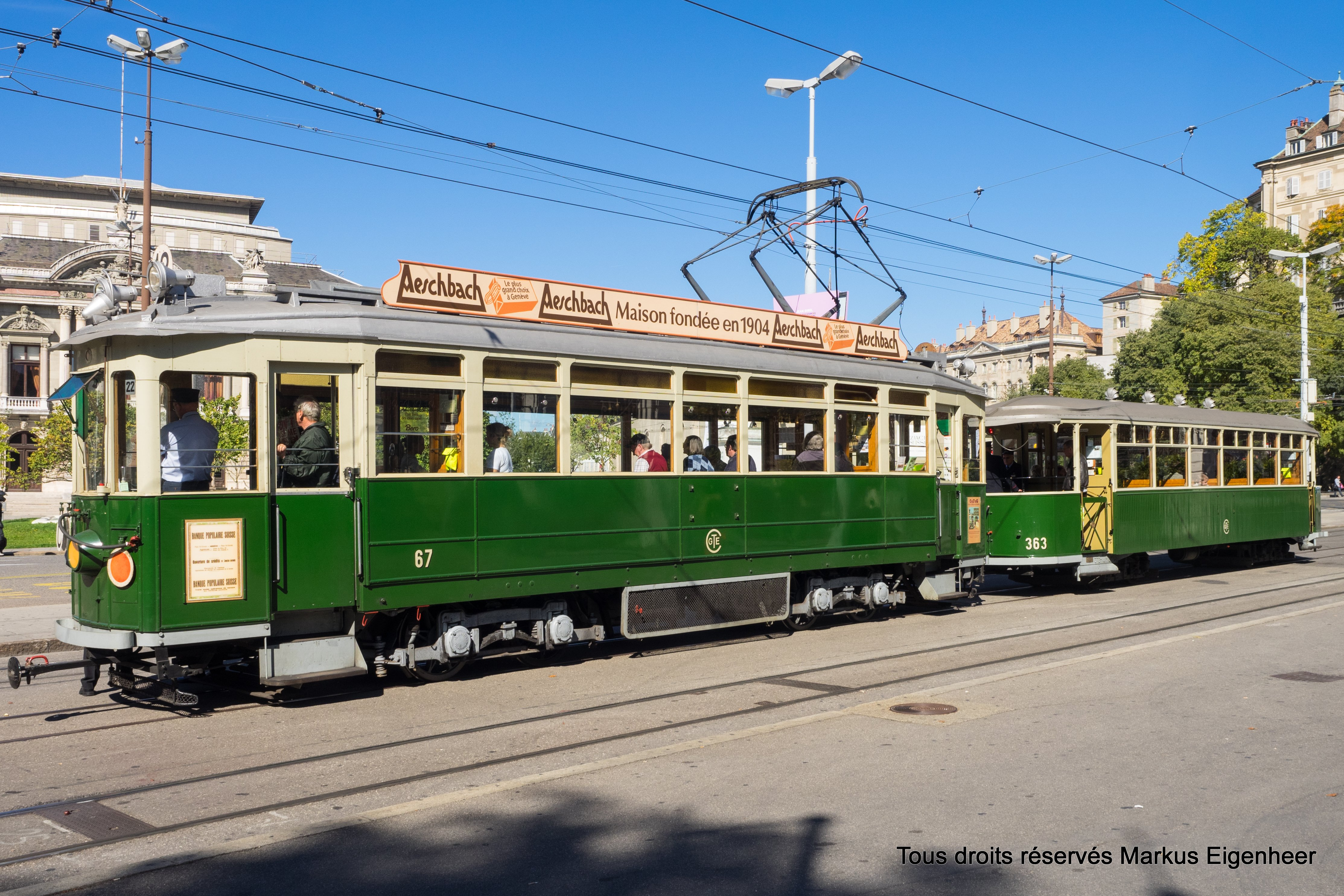
Heritage tram set with motor car 67 and trailer 363

=== Heritage motor cars ===
- Ce 4/4 66 (1901/1936) CGTE/SAAS, returned from AMITRAM (Lille), currently in restoration
- Ce 4/4 67 (1901/1936) CGTE/SAAS
- Ce 2/2 80 (1901) Herbrandt, on loan from AMTUIR (Paris), not operational
- Ce 2/2 125 (1920) SIG/SAAS, on loan from Blonay–Chamby Museum Railway (BC)
- Ce 4/4 729 (1952) SWP/SAAS (Swiss Standard Tram)

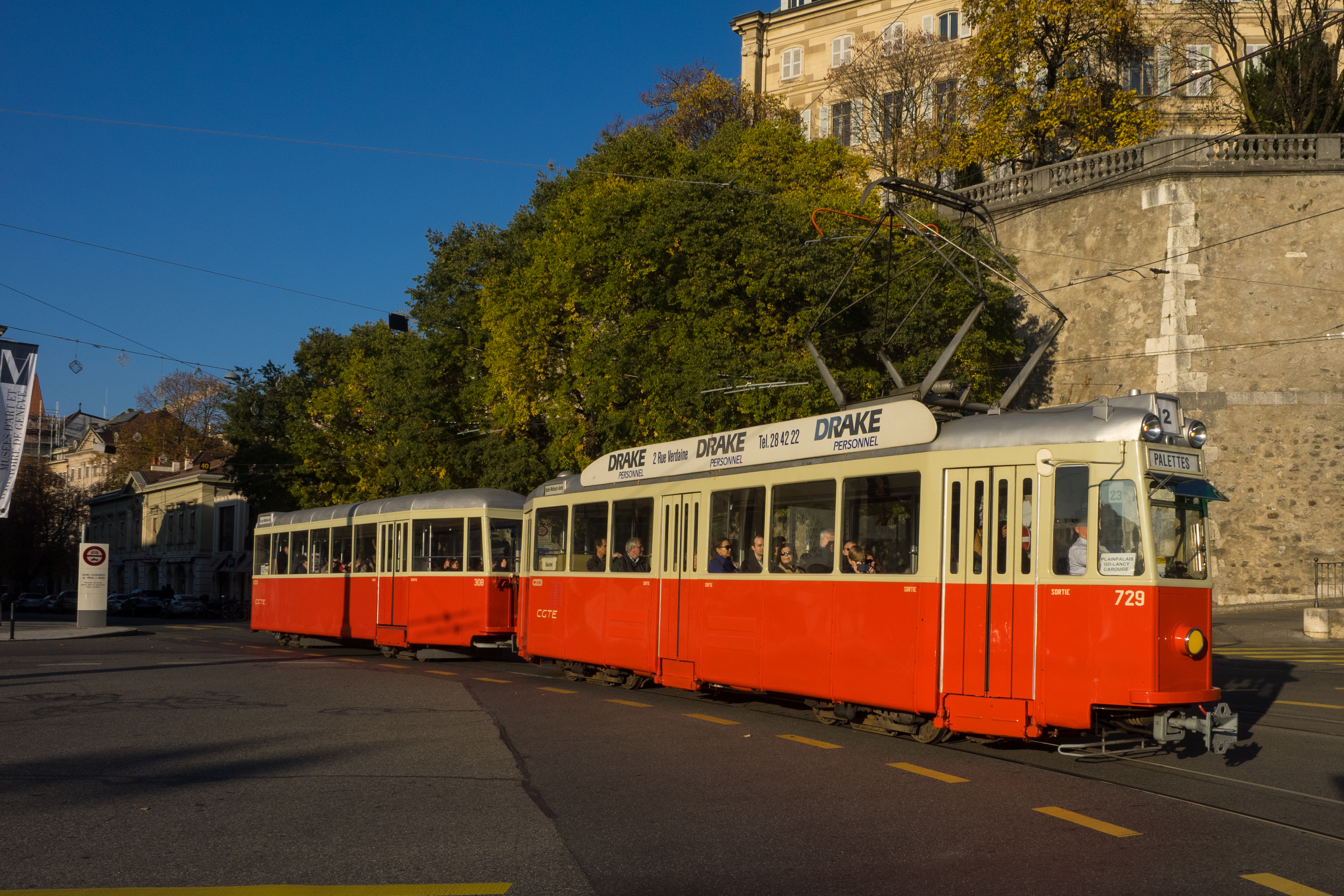
Heritage tram set with motor car 729 and trailer 308

=== Heritage trailer cars ===
- Bi 363 (1919) SIG
- Bi 369 (1919) SIG, returned from AMTUIR (Paris)
- B 308 (1951) FFA
- M 410 (1913) SWS, box car bought from BVB with No. 204, currently in restoration as a CGTE freight car
- X 603, snow plough, not operational, stored outside the network

=== Current fleet ===
Image	Model	Manufacturer	Entered service	Quantity	Fleet nos.	Length
	Be 4/6	Duewag	1984 and 1987 – 1989	24	801, 802 – 822, 825, 826	21.9 m (71 ft 10 1/4 in)
	Be 4/8	Duewag	2004 – 2005 and 2009 – 2010	21	831 – 852	30.9 m (101 ft 4 1/2 in)
	Flexity Outlook Cityrunner	Bombardier	2004 – 2005 and 2009 – 2010	39	861 – 899	42 m (137 ft 9 1/2 in)
	Tango	Stadler Rail	2011 – 2014 and 2016 – 2018	32	1801 – 1832	44 m (144 ft 4 1/4 in)

== See also ==
- List of town tramway systems in Switzerland
- Trolleybuses in Geneva
