= Lancy =

- Municipality
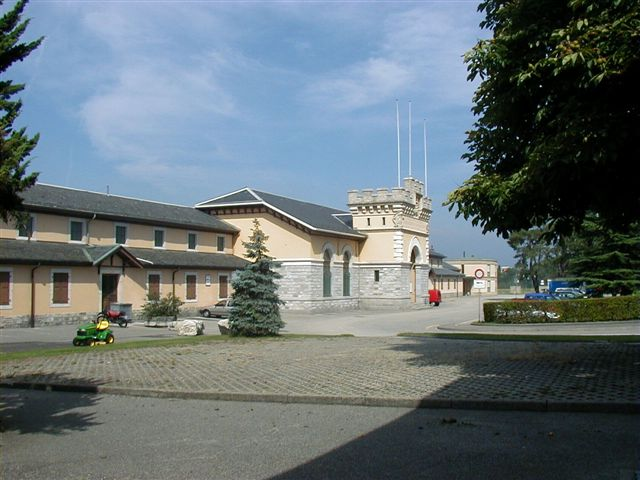

- Flag Coat of arms
- Location of Lancy
- Location within Switzerland Location within Canton of Geneva
- Coordinates: 46.183353°N 6.11665°E
- Country: Switzerland
- Canton: Geneva
- District: n.a.

Government
  - Mayor: Maire; Salima Moyard

Area
  - Total: 4.77 km^{2} (1.84 sq mi)
- Elevation: 307 m (1,007 ft)

Population (December 2020)
  - Total: 33,989
  - Density: 7,130/km^{2} (18,500/sq mi)
- Time zone: UTC+01:00 (CET)
  - Summer (DST): UTC+02:00 (CEST)
- Postal code: 1212, 1213, 1227
- SFOS number: 6628
- ISO 3166 code: CH-GE
- Surrounded by: Carouge, Geneva (Genève), Onex, Plan-les-Ouates, Vernier
- Website: lancy.ch

Lancy (French pronunciation: [lɑ̃si]) is a municipality of the Canton of Geneva, Switzerland.

== History ==
Lancy is first mentioned in 1097 as Lanciaco.

== Geography ==
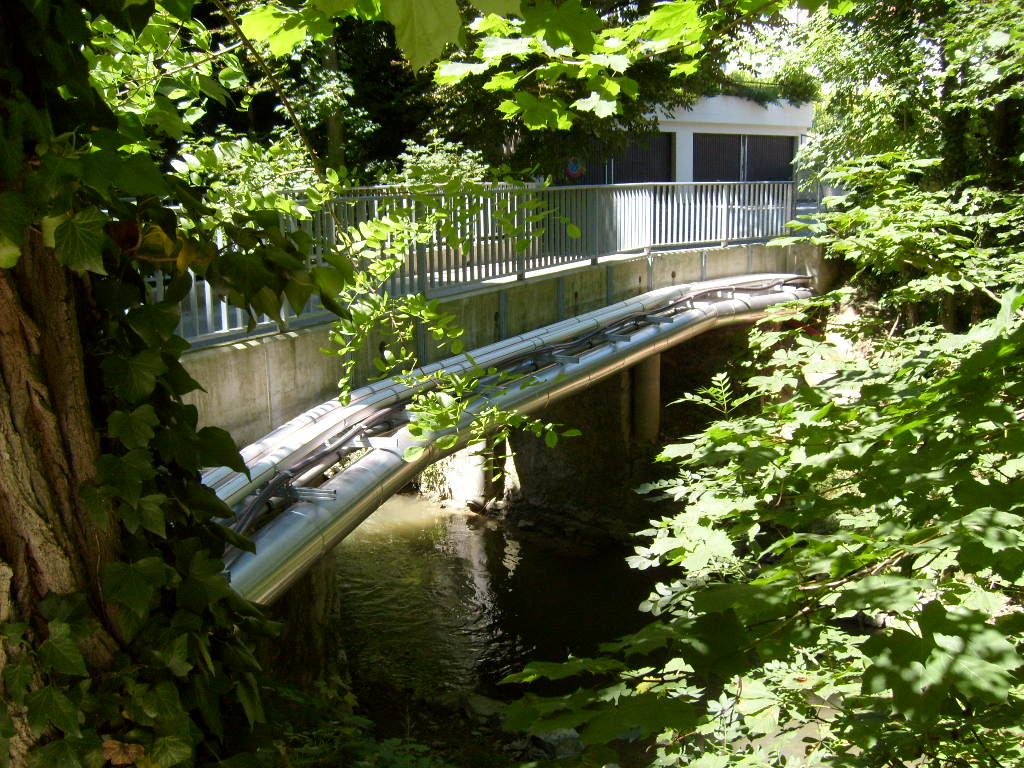
Bridge and river in Lancy

Aerial view (1964)

Lancy has an area, as of 2009, of 4.77 square kilometers (1.84 sq mi). Of this area, 0.25 km^{2} (0.097 sq mi) or 5.2% is used for agricultural purposes, while 0.31 km^{2} (0.12 sq mi) or 6.5% is forested. Of the rest of the land, 4.26 km^{2} (1.64 sq mi) or 89.3% is settled (buildings or roads), 0.02 km^{2} (4.9 acres) or 0.4% is either rivers or lakes.

Of the built up area, industrial buildings made up 8.2% of the total area while housing and buildings made up 45.7% and transportation infrastructure made up 26.4%. Power and water infrastructure as well as other special developed areas made up 2.7% of the area while parks, green belts and sports fields made up 6.3%. Out of the forested land, 5.0% of the total land area is heavily forested and 1.5% is covered with orchards or small clusters of trees. Of the agricultural land, 3.4% is used for growing crops and 1.5% is pastures. All the water in the municipality is flowing water.

The municipality is located on the left bank of the Rhone river. It consists of the villages of Grand-Lancy and Petit-Lancy (which are separated from each other by the Aire valley) as well as the hamlets of Pesay, Saint-Georges, La Tour, La Vendée, Le Pont Rouge.

The municipality of Lancy consists of the sub-sections or villages of Les Grandes-Communes, Lancy - Saint-Georges, Petit-Lancy - Tivoli, Surville, La Praille - Pont-Rouge, La Praille - Marchandises, La Praille - Rte des Jeunes, La Praille - stade, Lancy - La Chapelle, Le Bachet, Les Palettes.

== Demographics ==
Largest groups of foreign residents 2013
Nationality	Amount	% total (population)
Portugal	3,074	10.5
Italy	1,363	4.6
France	1,034	3.5
Spain	1,031	3.5
Kosovo	350	1.1
Brazil	214	0.7
China	213	0.7
Germany	205	0.7
UK	161	0.5
Serbia	161	0.5
Morocco	135	0.5
USA	117	0.4
Turkey	109	0.4
Cameroon	102	0.3
Colombia	97	0.3
Russia	91	0.3
Bolivia	80	0.3
Tunisia	78	0.3
Bosnia and Herzegovina	73	0.2
Poland	71	0.2

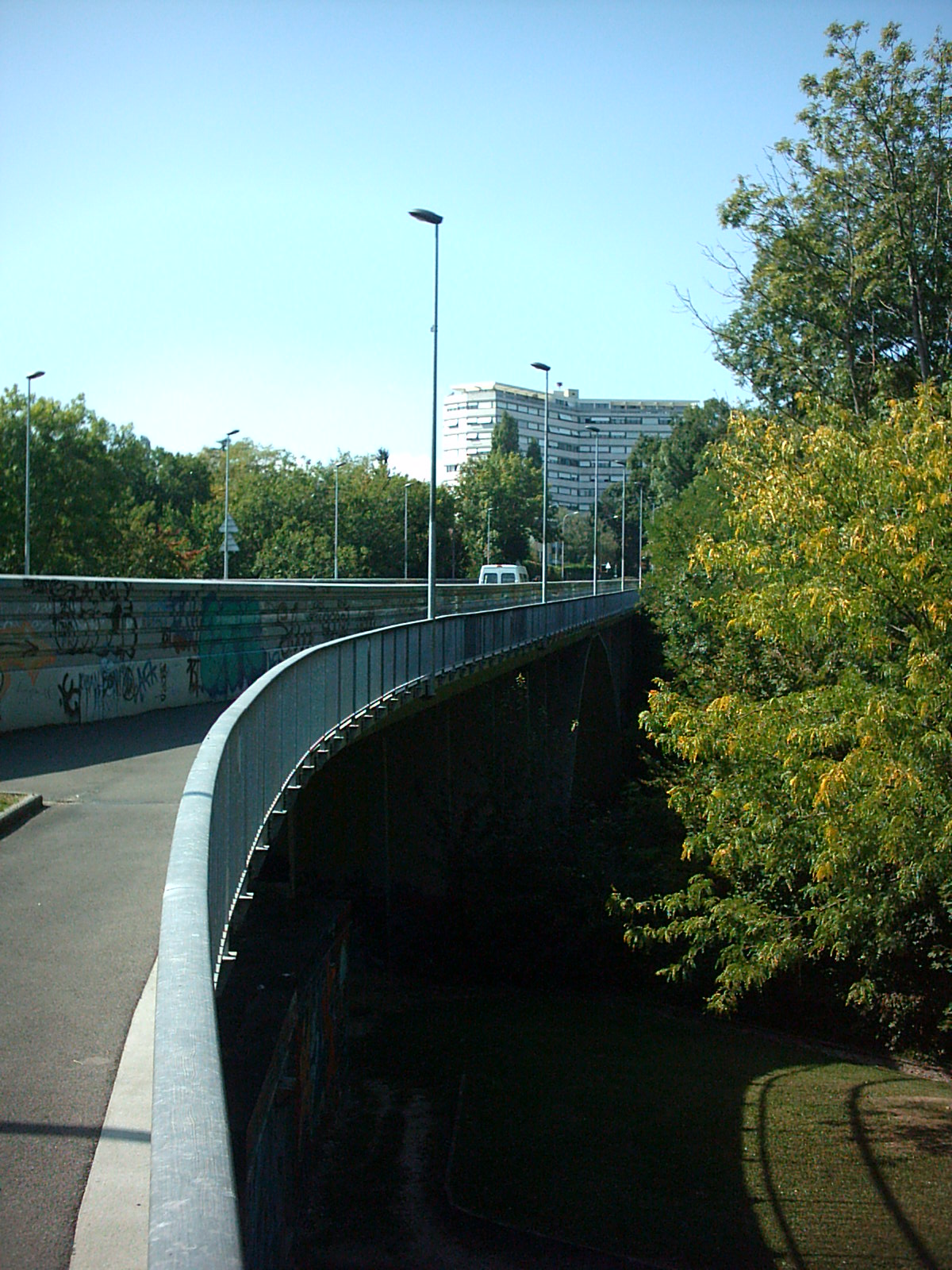
Lancy Bridge

Lancy has a population (as of December 2020) of 33,989. As of 2008, 35.0% of the population are resident foreign nationals. From 1999 to 2009, the population changed at a rate of 12%. It changed at a rate of 6.2% due to migration and at a rate of 6.2% due to births and deaths.

Most of the population (as of 2000) speaks French (20,422 or 79.5%), with Portuguese being second most common (1,031 or 4.0%) and Italian being third (1,029 or 4.0%). There are 883 people who speak German and 10 people who speak Romansh.

As of 2008, the gender distribution of the population was 48.2% male and 51.8% female. The population was made up of 8,568 Swiss men (29.7% of the population) and 5,311 (18.4%) non-Swiss men. There were 9,994 Swiss women (34.7%) and 4,938 (17.1%) non-Swiss women. Of the population in the municipality 4,565 or about 17.8% were born in Lancy and lived there in 2000. There were 6,166 or 24.0% who were born in the same canton, while 4,305 or 16.8% were born somewhere else in Switzerland, and 9,294 or 36.2% were born outside of Switzerland.

In 2008 there were 200 live births to Swiss citizens and 119 births to non-Swiss citizens. In same time span there were 132 deaths of Swiss citizens and 31 non-Swiss citizen deaths. Ignoring immigration and emigration, the population of Swiss citizens increased by 68 while the foreign population increased by 88. There were 93 Swiss men and 78 Swiss women who emigrated from Switzerland. At the same time, there were 263 non-Swiss men and 246 non-Swiss women who immigrated from another country to Switzerland. The total Swiss population change in 2008 (from all sources, including moves across municipal borders) was an increase of 179 and the non-Swiss population increased by 383 people. This represents a population growth rate of 2.1%.

The age distribution of the population (as of 2000) is children and teenagers (0–19 years old) make up 22.6% of the population, while adults (20–64 years old) make up 62.7% and seniors (over 64 years old) make up 14.7%.

As of 2000, there were 10,070 people who were single and never married in the municipality. There were 12,343 married individuals, 1,327 widows or widowers and 1,948 individuals who are divorced.

As of 2000, there were 11,205 private households in the municipality and an average of 2.2 persons per household. There were 4,092 households that consist of only one person and 511 households with five or more people. Out of a total of 11,466 households that answered this question, 35.7% were made up of just one person and there were 52 adults who lived with their parents. Of the rest of the households, there are 2,908 married couples without children, 3,173 married couples with children. There were 834 single parents with a child or children. There were 146 households that were made up of unrelated people and 261 households that were made up of some sort of institution or another collective housing.

In 2000 there were 866 single family homes (or 51.7% of the total) out of a total of 1,676 inhabited buildings. There were 467 multi-family buildings (27.9%), along with 263 multi-purpose buildings that were mostly used for housing (15.7%) and 80 other-use buildings (commercial or industrial) that also had some housing (4.8%). Of the single family homes 179 were built before 1919, while 76 were built between 1990 and 2000. The greatest number of single family homes (216) were built between 1919 and 1945.

In 2000 there were 11,915 apartments in the municipality. The most common apartment size was three rooms of which there were 3,899. There were 911 single-room apartments and 1,868 apartments with five or more rooms. Of these apartments, 10,895 apartments (91.4% of the total) were permanently occupied, while 895 apartments (7.5%) were seasonally occupied and 125 apartments (1.0%) were empty. As of 2009, the construction rate of new housing units was 4.3 new units per 1000 residents. The vacancy rate for the municipality, in 2010, was 0.21%.

The historical population is given in the following chart:

== Politics ==
In the 2007 federal election the most popular party was the SVP which received 23.87% of the vote. The next three most popular parties were the SP (21.8%), the Green Party (14.47%) and the CVP (11.59%). In the federal election, a total of 6,431 votes were cast, and the voter turnout was 45.7%.

In the 2009 Grand Conseil election, there were a total of 14,212 registered voters of which 5,390 (37.9%) voted. The most popular party in the municipality for this election was the MCG with 20.7% of the ballots. In the canton-wide election they received the third highest proportion of votes. The second most popular party was the Les Socialistes (with 13.3%), they were fourth in the canton-wide election, while the third most popular party was the Les Verts (with 12.9%), they were second in the canton-wide election.

For the 2009 Conseil d'Etat election, there were a total of 14,236 registered voters of which 6,558 (46.1%) voted.

In 2011, all the municipalities held local elections, and in Lancy there were 35 spots open on the municipal council. There were a total of 19,698 registered voters of which 7,004 (35.6%) voted. Out of the 7,004 votes, there were 29 blank votes, 39 null or unreadable votes and 306 votes with a name that was not on the list.

== Transport ==
The commune has the head office of Geneva Public Transport. There are two railway stations, Lancy-Pont-Rouge and Lancy-Bachet. Both are located on the CEVA orbital railway with frequent service by trains of the Léman Express.

== Economy ==
As of 2010, Lancy had an unemployment rate of 6.9%. As of 2008, there were 12 people employed in the primary economic sector and about 3 businesses involved in this sector. 1,785 people were employed in the secondary sector and there were 227 businesses in this sector. 15,091 people were employed in the tertiary sector, with 887 businesses in this sector. There were 12,713 residents of the municipality who were employed in some capacity, of which females made up 45.6% of the workforce.

In 2008 the total number of full-time equivalent jobs was 14,725. The number of jobs in the primary sector was 9, all of which were in agriculture. The number of jobs in the secondary sector was 1,717 of which 526 or (30.6%) were in manufacturing and 1,127 (65.6%) were in construction. The number of jobs in the tertiary sector was 12,999. In the tertiary sector; 4,014 or 30.9% were in wholesale or retail sales or the repair of motor vehicles, 2,451 or 18.9% were in the movement and storage of goods, 417 or 3.2% were in a hotel or restaurant, 329 or 2.5% were in the information industry, 1,292 or 9.9% were the insurance or financial industry, 1,031 or 7.9% were technical professionals or scientists, 1,012 or 7.8% were in education and 767 or 5.9% were in health care.

In 2000, there were 10,930 workers who commuted into the municipality and 10,351 workers who commuted away. The municipality is a net importer of workers, with about 1.1 workers entering the municipality for every one leaving. About 15.1% of the workforce coming into Lancy are coming from outside Switzerland, while 0.1% of the locals commute out of Switzerland for work. Of the working population, 32.5% used public transportation to get to work, and 48.3% used a private car.

== Religion ==
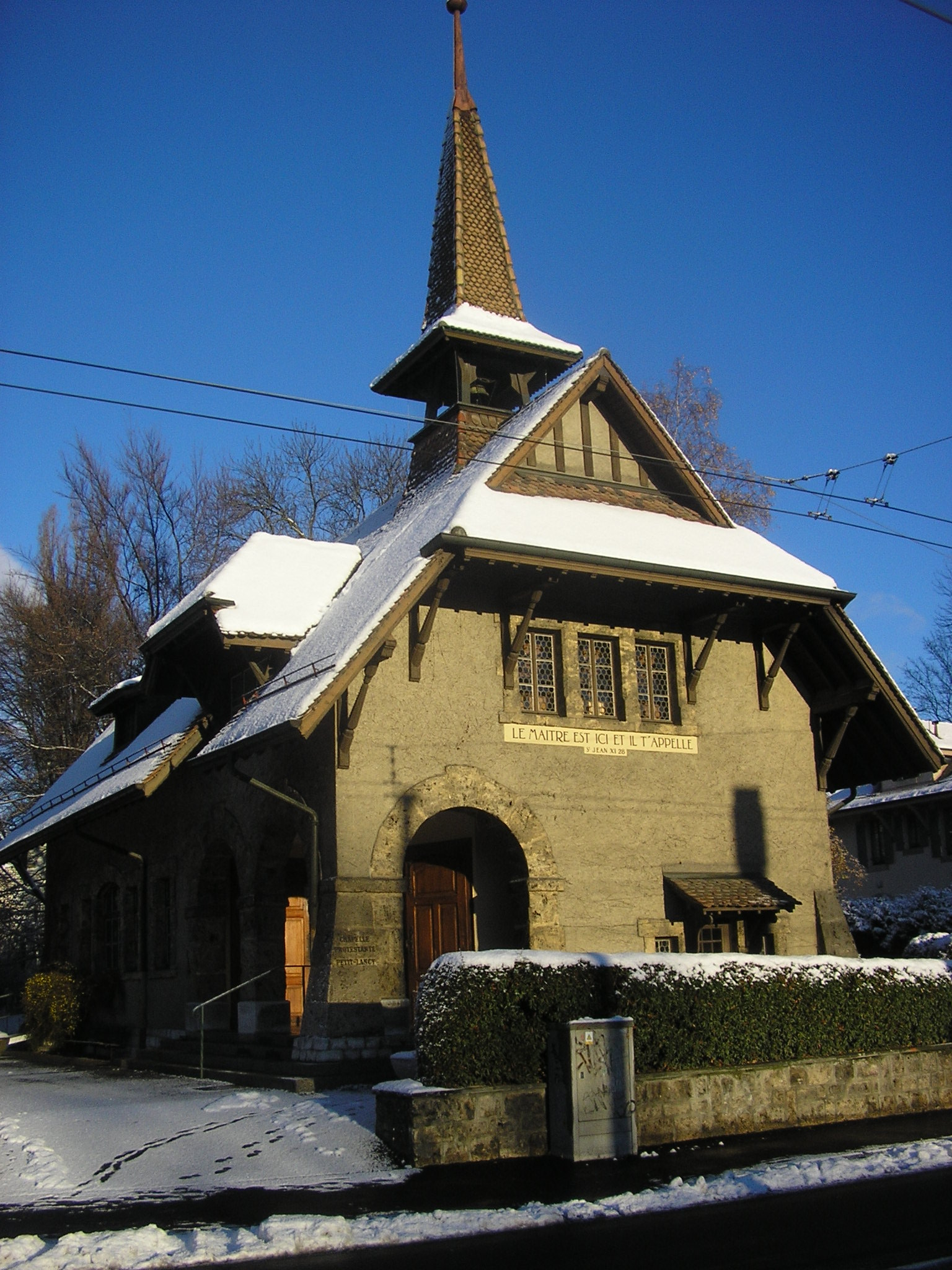
Protestant Chapel in Lancy

From the 2000 census, 11,624 or 45.3% were Roman Catholic, while 4,046 or 15.8% belonged to the Swiss Reformed Church. Of the rest of the population, there were 333 members of an Orthodox church (or about 1.30% of the population), there were 53 individuals (or about 0.21% of the population) who belonged to the Christian Catholic Church, and there were 509 individuals (or about 1.98% of the population) who belonged to another Christian church. There were 94 individuals (or about 0.37% of the population) who were Jewish, and 1,004 (or about 3.91% of the population) who were Islamic. There were 68 individuals who were Buddhist, 42 individuals who were Hindu and 46 individuals who belonged to another church. 5,455 (or about 21.24% of the population) belonged to no church, are agnostic or atheist, and 2,414 individuals (or about 9.40% of the population) did not answer the question.

== Education ==
In Lancy about 8,219 or (32.0%) of the population have completed non-mandatory upper secondary education, and 3,799 or (14.8%) have completed additional higher education (either university or a Fachhochschule). Of the 3,799 who completed tertiary schooling, 40.4% were Swiss men, 32.1% were Swiss women, 16.5% were non-Swiss men and 11.0% were non-Swiss women.

During the 2009–2010 school year there were a total of 5,817 students in the Lancy school system. The education system in the Canton of Geneva allows young children to attend two years of non-obligatory Kindergarten. During that school year, there were 494 children who were in a pre-kindergarten class. The canton's school system provides two years of non-mandatory kindergarten and requires students to attend six years of primary school, with some of the children attending smaller, specialized classes. In Lancy there were 889 students in kindergarten or primary school and 150 students were in the special, smaller classes. The secondary school program consists of three lower, obligatory years of schooling, followed by three to five years of optional, advanced schools. There were 889 lower secondary students who attended school in Lancy. There were 1,356 upper secondary students from the municipality along with 232 students who were in a professional, non-university track program. An additional 305 students attended a private school.

As of 2000, there were 2,671 students in Lancy who came from another municipality, while 1,297 residents attended schools outside the municipality.

Collège de Saussure is located in Lancy.

== Notable people ==
- Jean Dunand (1877–1942) a French lacquer, sculptor, dinandier (copper manufacturer) and interior designer; a lacquer artist of the Art Deco period
- Nicolas Bouvier (1929–1998) a Swiss traveller, writer, picture editor and photographer
