= Susanne Stephenson =

American ceramicist (born 1935)

Susanne Stephenson (born 1935, in Canton, Ohio) is an American sculptor and ceramics artist.

She earned her BFA from Carnegie Mellon University and her MFA (in 1960) from the Cranbrook Academy of Art. She taught briefly at the University of Michigan (1960–61), and then went on to Eastern Michigan University, where she has been a professor of art since 1963.

Stephenson's work is held in the permanent collections of many museums, including Los Angeles County Museum of Art, the Carnegie Museum of Art, Museum of Decorative Arts in Prague, the Everson Museum of Art, the Victoria & Albert Museum, the Detroit Institute of Arts, the Crocker Art Museum, the Cranbrook Museum of Art, the Downey Museum of Art, the Mint Museum, the Musee Ariana, the Gardiner Museum, the Foshan/Nanfeng Museum and San Bao Collection, the International Ceramic Center, the Benaki Museum, the American Ceramic Museum, and the University of Michigan Museum of Art.

In 2010, she was elected a Fellow of the American Craft Council.

Stephenson's work is known for its "[s]weeping curves, twisting curlicues, and swirling whiplashes . . . [s]imultaneously sculpture, vessel, and/or abstract form."
