= Kouji Ochiai (painter) =

Japanese painter and printmaker (1948–2024)

- 落合皎児
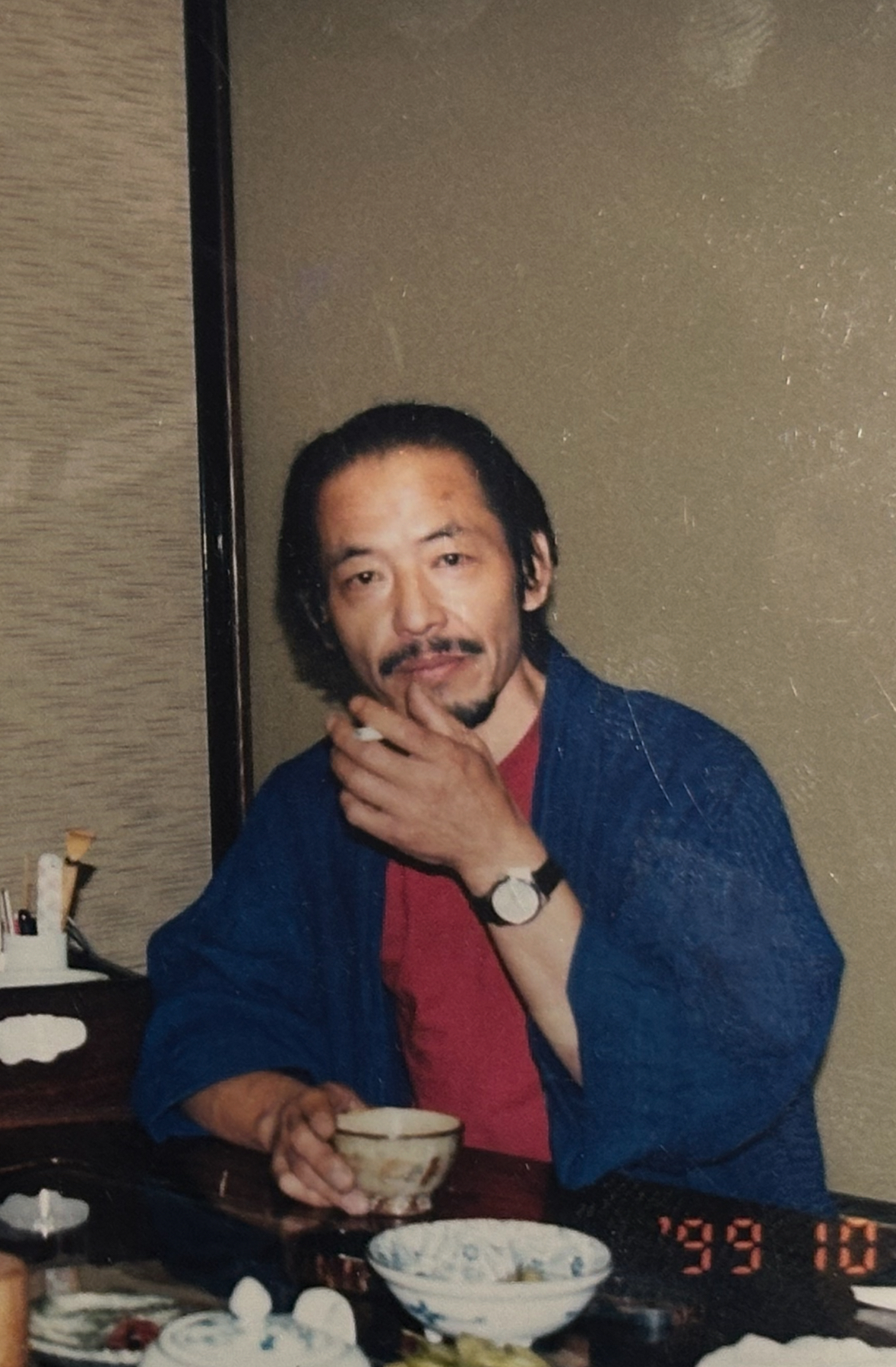
- Kouji Ochiai, painter and printmaker
- Born: 落合皎児; February 27, 1948; Nagano Prefecture, Japan
- Died: April 11, 2024 (aged 76); Matsushiro, Nagano, Japan
- Known for: Painting, Printmaking (lithography, etching)
- Notable work: Lluvia de la tarde nº 5 (1982); Viento en espejo (1983); Water mirror series (1988); Lueurs sur le cœur (2010)
- Movement: Abstract art

Kouji Ochiai (落合皎児, also known as Kōji Ochiai; February 27, 1948 – April 11, 2024) was a Japanese painter and printmaker who developed his career primarily in Barcelona, Spain, from 1978 onward. His work is held in the permanent collections of the Biblioteca Nacional de España, the usée d'Art et d'Histoire in Geneva, and the Library of Congress in Washington, D.C. In 1984 he received the Primera Mención (first commendation) at the 23rd Premio Internacional de Dibuix Joan Miró,and in 1989 he was included in the official catalogue La estampa contemporánea en España (150 artistas gráficos), published by Madrid City Hall and the Real Academia de Bellas Artes de San Fernando.

== Biography ==
=== Early life and education ===
Kouji Ochiai was born on February 27, 1948, in Nagano Prefecture, Japan. After completing high school, he travelled to Spain in 1968 and enrolled at the Escola de la Llotja in Barcelona, where he studied painting, sculpture and printmaking. After his visa expired, he travelled to Paris and subsequently returned to Japan, where he worked in commercial design before enrolling in the printmaking research department of Sokei Art School in Tokyo, from which he graduated.

=== Barcelona: printmaker and artist (1978–1990s) ===
Recognised for his printmaking skills, Ochiai returned to Barcelona in 1978 and joined Studio 46 (Taller 46) of Joan Barbará, one of Barcelona's foremost master printers, where he worked as a printer on editions by Joan Miró and Antoni Tàpies, among others. From 1979 to 1983, he served as a lecturer in lithography at the Real Academia de Artes Aplicadas de España in Barcelona.

Following the birth of his son, Ochiai turned his full attention to his own artistic practice. In 1981 he signed an exclusive contract with Galería Estiarte, one of Barcelona's leading contemporary print galleries.

In 1983, the Biblioteca Nacional de España (BNE) acquired two of his works for its permanent collection: Lluvia de la tarde nº 5 (1982, etching, INVENT/68692) and Viento en espejo (1983, etching, INVENT/68696), both purchased through Galería Estiarte. According to BNE conservator Raquel Arroyo, Ochiai is the only Japanese artist represented in the institution's modern art holdings.

That same year he received second prize at the 10th Premio Abril de Grabado in Madrid. In 1984, he received the Primera Mención (first commendation) at the 23rd Premio Internacional de Dibuix Joan Miró, organised by the Fundació Joan Miró in Barcelona, for his work Wind's Memory (1984, 48×38 cm). The prize exhibition ran at the Fundació from 24 July to 16 September 1984.

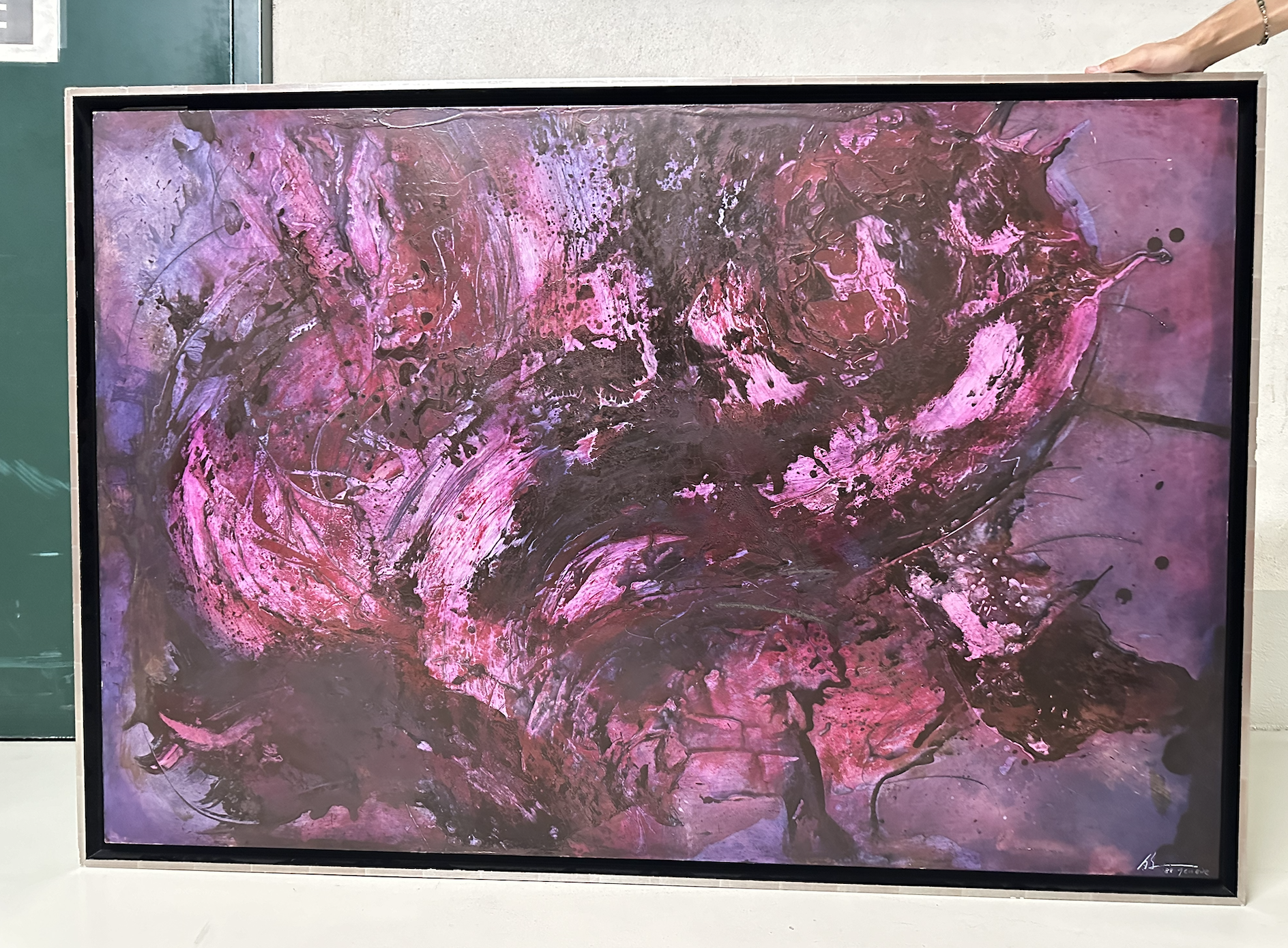
Water mirror I, 1988, mixed media, 80×110 cm, Geneva

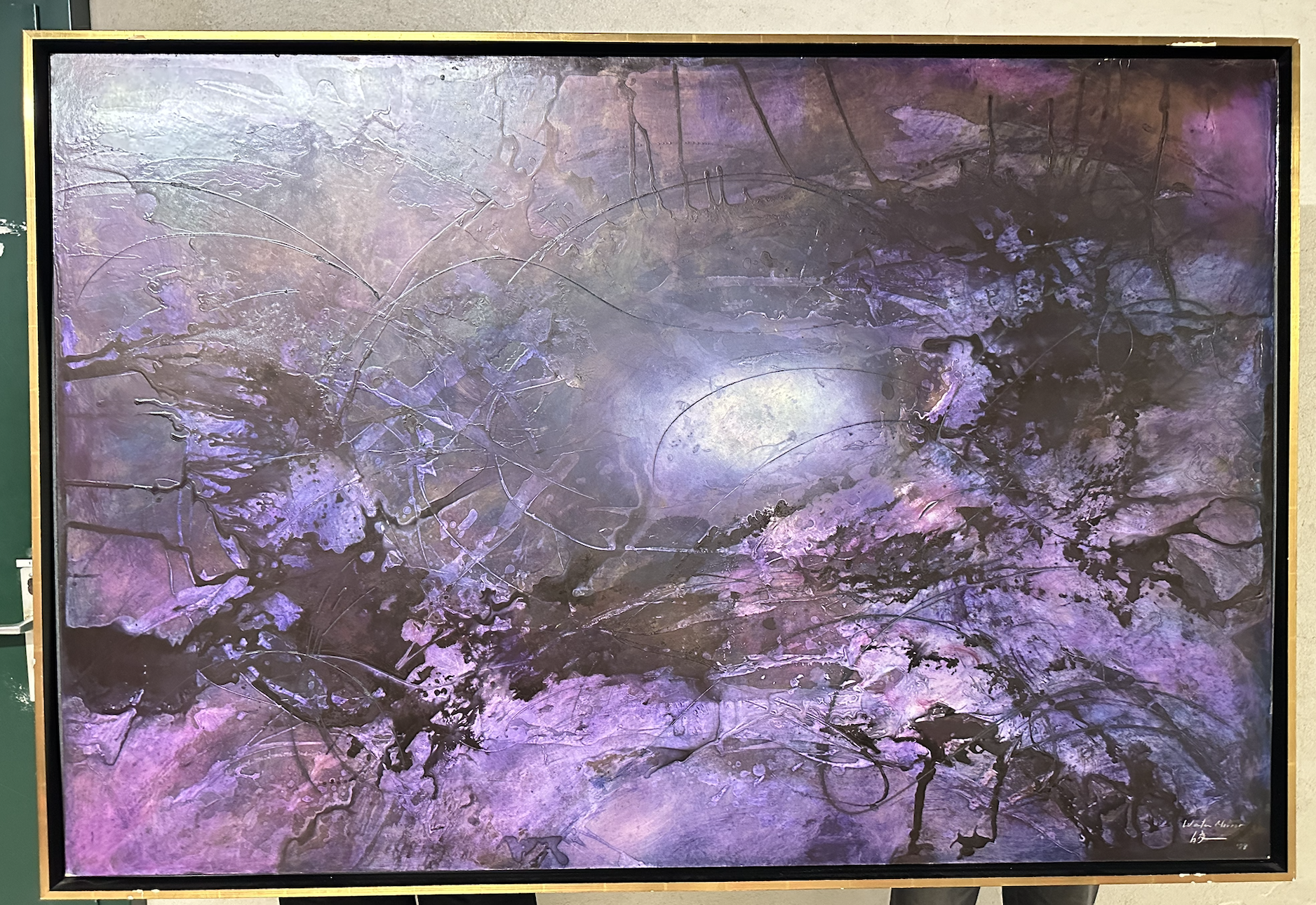
Water mirror II, 1988, mixed media, 80×110 cm, Geneva

In 1989, Madrid City Hall and the Real Academia de Bellas Artes de San Fernando (Calcografía Nacional) co-published La estampa contemporánea en España (150 artistas gráficos), a three-volume official catalogue documenting the history of Spanish printmaking from Dürer to the twentieth-century avant-garde. Ochiai was among the artists included, alongside Pablo Picasso, Joan Miró, Salvador Dalí, and Antoni Tàpies.

In May 1991, he held a solo exhibition, "KOUJI OCHIAI: Pinturas y dibujos", at Galería Gamarra y Garrigues (Almagro 44, Madrid), whose annual programme that year also featured Barceló, Chillida, Miró, Picasso, and Tàpies. In 1995, he received an award at the 12th Premio Internacional de Grabado Máximo Ramos in Ferrol.

=== Switzerland and collaboration with Michel Butor ===
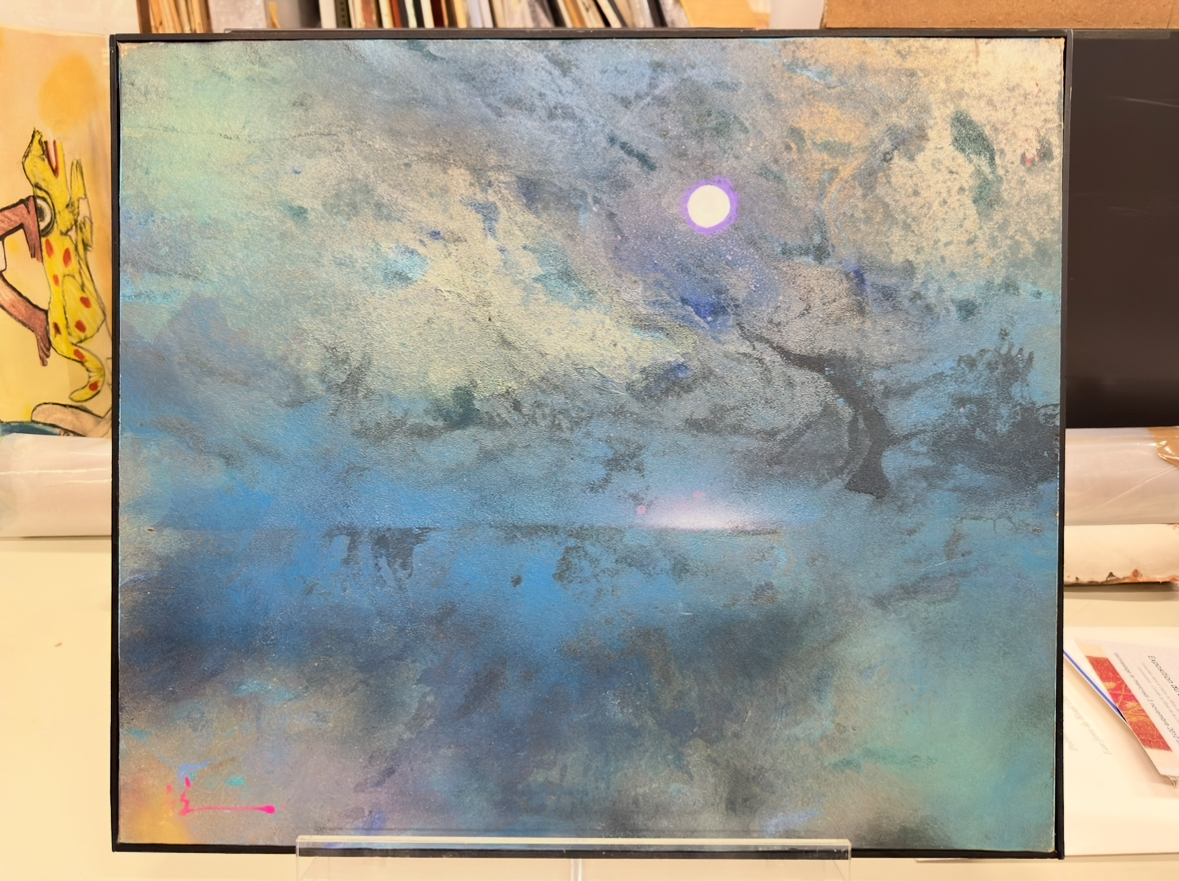
Watermoon, mixed media, Geneva

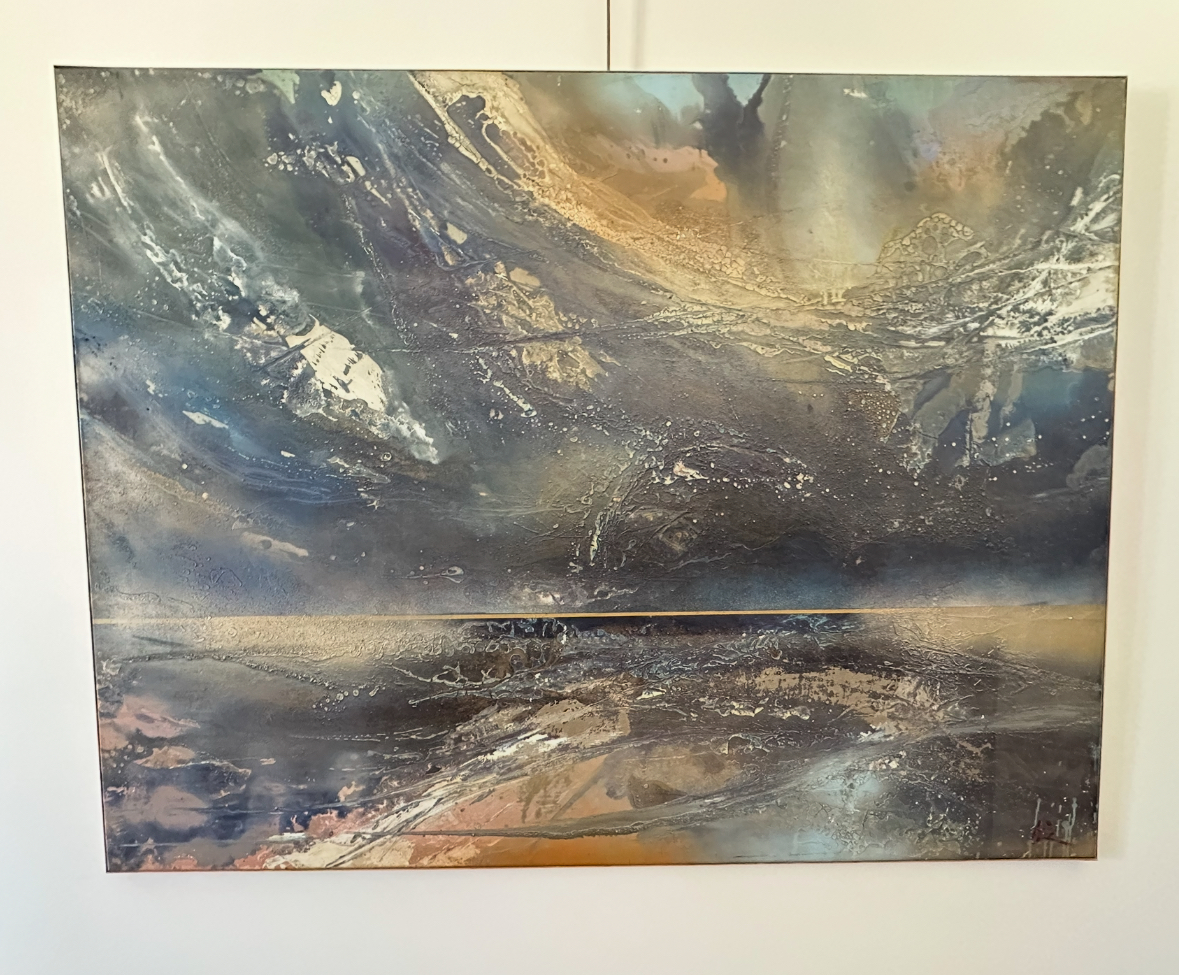
Battleground (after Emily Dickinson), owned by the Municipality of Chêne-Bougeries, Switzerland

In Geneva, Ochiai collaborated with Editart publisher Orlando Blanco on a series of livres d'artiste. His 1983 work Les Cambres was a collaboration with Barcelona-based novelist and poet Gloria Montero; as noted in Montero's official biography on the IAFOR (International Academic Forum) website, "Her poem Les Cambres was printed with a portfolio of prints by artist Kouji Ochiai (Contratalla 1983)."

In 2010 he co-produced Lueurs sur le cœur with French writer Michel Butor — a limited-edition artist's book featuring Butor's unpublished poetry alongside Ochiai's drawings. The Archipel Butor research centre in Lucinges documents Ochiai alongside Pierre Alechinsky and Zao Wou-Ki as one of Butor's most trusted artistic collaborators.

The Musée d'Art et d'Histoire (MAH) in Geneva holds his 1983 etching Les yeux fermés in its permanent collection (accession no. MM-391643). The Swiss National Library holds a copy of Lueurs sur le cœur (call no. BN 001615567). In 2010 he held an official solo exhibition as part of the "Mois de la culture japonaise", sponsored by the Consulate General of Japan in Geneva.

=== Return to Japan and later life ===
Ochiai returned to Japan and established an atelier in the Matsushiro district of Nagano City, while continuing to travel between Japan and Europe for exhibitions and collaborations. On April 11, 2024, he died in a fire at his home in Matsushiro at the age of 76. His atelier, which survived the fire, contained approximately 1,000 works.

== Awards and recognition ==
- Second prize, 10th Premio Abril de Grabado (1983, Madrid)
- Primera Mención (first commendation), 23rd Premio Internacional de Dibuix Joan Miró (1984, Fundació Joan Miró, Barcelona); awarded work: Wind's Memory (1984, 48×38 cm). The prize exhibition was held at the Fundació Joan Miró from 24 July to 16 September 1984, followed by a touring exhibition in Japan (Okinawa, Tokyo, Sendai) from October 1984 to March 1985.
- Award, 12th Premio Internacional de Grabado Máximo Ramos (1995, Ferrol)
- Included in La estampa contemporánea en España (150 artistas gráficos) (1989, Madrid City Hall / Real Academia de Bellas Artes de San Fernando)
- Permanent collection, Biblioteca Nacional de España (INVENT/68692, INVENT/68696, ER/5821)
- Permanent collection, Musée d'Art et d'Histoire, Geneva (MM-391643)
- Collection, Swiss National Library (BN 001615567)
- Collection, Library of Congress, Prints and Photographs Division, Washington, D.C. (Memory in Water, 2004)
- Exclusive contract, Galería Estiarte, Barcelona (1981)
- Suzaka Woodblock Print Museum / Hiratsuka Un'ichi Print Museum (Nagano Prefecture, Japan); two works: Mizukagami (Water Mirror) (1990), collagraph, 700×950 mm

== Selected works ==
- 1984–85: 23rd Premio Internacional de Dibuix Joan Miró — Japan touring exhibition (Okinawa: Urazoe City Cultural Hall; Tokyo: Tokyo Central Museum, Ginza; Sendai: Miyagi Prefectural Museum), October 1984 – March 1985

=== In public collections ===
- Lluvia de la tarde nº 5 (1982), etching, Biblioteca Nacional de España (INVENT/68692)
- Viento en espejo (1983), etching, Biblioteca Nacional de España (INVENT/68696)
- Les yeux fermés (1983), etching, Musée d'Art et d'Histoire, Geneva (MM-391643)
- Sans titre (1982), etching, Musée d'Art et d'Histoire, Geneva (MM-393459)
- Colophon (1991), artist's book with Borja de Pedro, Biblioteca Nacional de España (ER/5821)
- Memory in Water (2004), etching/collage, Library of Congress, Washington, D.C.
- Permanent collection, Museu de Belles Arts de Castelló, Spain (Espejo del Agua, 1997, six-panel folding screen, etching and calligraphy with calligraphers Kawamura Ryushu and Kimi Nishiyama; reg. no. 3603)
- Mizukagami (Water Mirror) (1990), collagraph, 700×950 mm, Suzaka Woodblock Print Museum / Hiratsuka Un'ichi Print Museum, Nagano Prefecture, Japan (two works)

=== Artist's books and publications ===
- Haiku (1981–82), six original etchings in collaboration with poets Keith Patterson and José María Sancho Fortich, Barcelona. Limited edition of 99 copies.
- Les Cambres (1983), with Gloria Montero, Barcelona
- Lueurs sur le cœur (Editart, Geneva, 2010), with Michel Butor
- Neko neko neko ga ippai (大日本図書, 1993)
- Mori ni wa ippai (架空社, 1998)
- Mabushii higeki: hikari kaze mizu (架空社, 2003)

== Legacy ==
Following Ochiai's death, his son Yosuke Gifre Ochiai founded Project Kou (一般社団法人プロジェクト皎), a nonprofit organisation dedicated to preserving and promoting his legacy. A retrospective exhibition, "Kouji Ochiai LIFE AFTER LIFE", was held at the Ueno no Mori Museum in Tokyo in July 2025 (free admission; organised by Project Kou, with the support of Fuji Television).

Fuji Television's documentary series The Nonfiction (ザ・ノンフィクション) devoted a three-part special, The Nonfiction: The Father I Never Knew – Lost to the Flames (炎の中で死んだ父を僕は知らない 〜遺された絵画と借金と〜), broadcast from November 17 to December 1, 2024, to the story of Yosuke Gifre Ochiai's journey to discover the life and work of his father following his death. It was the first installment in the program's over 30-year history to air across three consecutive weeks. In May 2026, the program received the Intermedia-Globe Gold Award in the Documentary: History & Biography category at the WorldMediaFestival 2026 in Berlin, Germany — Fuji Television's first-ever Gold at the festival. In 2025, a doctoral dissertation submitted to the University of Zaragoza (Alejandra Rodríguez Cunchillos, Coleccionismo privado y coleccionistas de arte contemporáneo japonés en España) formally situated Ochiai as a significant figure in the reception of Japanese contemporary art in Spain, with his works listed in a scholarly catalogue of works held in Spanish private collections.

== See also ==
- Joan Miró
- Antoni Tàpies
- Michel Butor
- Biblioteca Nacional de España
- Library of Congress
- Galería Estiarte
- Sokei Art School
