= List of museums in Geneva =

This is a list of museums in Geneva, Switzerland. Geneva is one of the country's densest museum cities and home to institutions of international standing. Also included are university and non-profit art galleries, arts centres, and cultural centres with galleries.

== List of Museums ==
| Name | Image | Quartier | Type | Focus | Summary |
|---|---|---|---|---|---|
| Archaeological Site of St. Pierre Cathedral | | Cité | Archaeology | Roman and early medieval Geneva | Underground remains of four successive cathedrals from the 4th century, mosaics and an Allobrogian chieftain's tomb |
| Bibliothèque de Genève | | Plainpalais | Library | Books and manuscripts | Rotating exhibitions from the library's collections of manuscripts, early printed books, posters and photographs, in the Couloir des coups d'œil and the Art Nouveau Espace Ami Lullin |
| Cast Collection of the University of Geneva | | Plainpalais | Art | Ancient sculpture | Plaster casts of Greek and Roman sculpture assembled from 1779 |
| Centre d'Art Contemporain Genève | | Plainpalais | Art | Contemporary art | First contemporary art institution in Suisse romande; organiser of the Biennale de l'Image en Mouvement |
| Centre de la photographie Genève | | Plainpalais | Art | Photography | Non-collecting venue exhibiting new commissions, media art, and film |
| FMAC | | Jonction | Art | Contemporary art | Temporary exhibitions |
| Fondation Baur | | Champel | Art | East-Asian art | Late 19th-century town house holding the some 9,000 Chinese and Japanese works collected by Alfred Baur |
| Galerie Forde | | Cité | Art | Contemporary art | Non-profit, artist-run space located in an alternative cultural center |
| Geneva Botanical Garden | | Sécheron | Natural history | Botany | Includes an interpretation space, temporary botanical exhibitions, and the listed houses La Console and Le Chêne |
| Geneva Fire Brigade Museum | | Jonction | History | Firefighting | History of the Geneva Fire Brigade, equipment, apparatus |
| Halle Nord | | Cité | Art | Contemporary art | Exhibitions, open studios, and window displays showcasing local and emerging artists |
| International Museum of the Reformation | | Cité | History | Reformation and Protestantism | Books, manuscripts, paintings and engravings |
| International Red Cross and Red Crescent Museum | | Sécheron | History | Humanitarian action | History of the Red Cross Movement, with the UNESCO-listed archives of the International Prisoners of War Agency and Henry Dunant's Nobel Peace Prize medal |
| Maison Tavel | | Cité | History | Geneva history | Operated by the MAH, 14th-century townhouse exhibiting Geneva urban history, daily life and the Relief Magnin model |
| Musée Ariana | | Sécheron | Art | Ceramics and glass | Bequeathed to the city in 1890 by Gustave Revilliod; Switzerland's only museum of ceramics and glass |
| Musée Barbier-Mueller | | Cité | Art | Non-Western and ancient art | Private museum showing the Barbier-Mueller family collection of African, Oceanic, Asian, pre-Columbian and classical works |
| Musée d'art et d'histoire | | Les Tranchées | Art | Encyclopedic | Fine arts, Egyptian, Greek and Roman archaeology, arms and armour, textiles, silverware, Geneva watchmaking and enamelling |
| Musée d'ethnographie de Genève | | Plainpalais | Art | Encyclopedic | African, American, Asian, European and Oceanian collections, ethnomusicology and visual anthropology |
| Musée d'histoire des sciences | | Sécheron | Science | History of science | Astronomy, microscopy, meteorology, navigation, surveying, medicine, sundials |
| Musée Rath | | Cité | Art | Temporary exhibitions | Switzerland's oldest purpose-built art museum and among the first in Europe; now the MAH's temporary exhibition venue |
| Musée Tatiana Zoubov | | Cité | Art | Decorative arts | 18th-century townhouse exhibiting paintings, period seat furniture, mantel clocks, Qing objects and a cabinet devoted to Catherine II |
| Musée Voltaire | | Saint-Jean | Literature | Voltaire and the Enlightenment | Voltaire's home Les Délices; the world's largest collection of his manuscripts, with paintings and prints of the writer and his circle |
| Muséum d'histoire naturelle | | Les Eaux-Vives | Natural history | Zoology, geology, palaeontology | Largest natural history museum in Switzerland |
| Museum of Modern and Contemporary Art (MAMCO) | | Plainpalais | Art | Modern and contemporary | Switzerland's largest contemporary art museum, in a former factory |
| Patek Philippe Museum | | Plainpalais | Horology | Watches and enamels | Corporate museum of the watchmaker Patek Philippe, showing its production and a collection of Genevan, Swiss and European watches, automata and enamels |
| Saint-Antoine Archaeological Site | | Cité | Archaeology | Geneva from antiquity to the modern era | Beneath esplanade Théodelinde |
| United Nations Museum | | Sécheron | History | Multilateral diplomacy | Documents from the United Nations archives on a century of multilateralism in Geneva, in the Palace of Nations |
| Villa Dutoit | | Petit-Saconnex | Art | Contemporary art | Contemporary art exhibitions by local and visiting artists in a listed villa, with concerts, talks and readings |

== See also ==
- Musée d'art et d'histoire
- Category:Tourist attractions in Geneva
