= Musée d'Art et d'Histoire (Geneva) =

Art museum in Geneva (Switzerland)

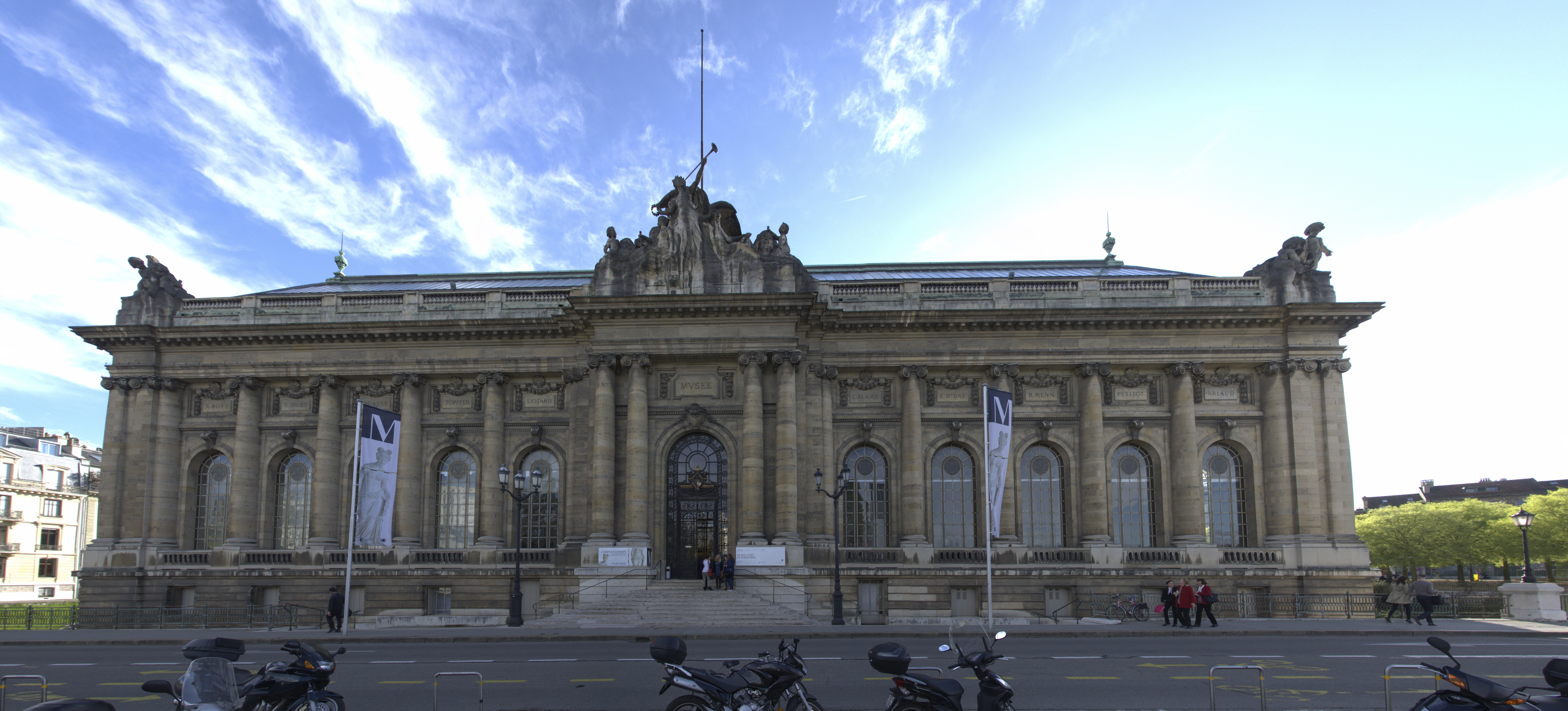
- The Musée d'Art et d'Histoire from the Promenade de l'Observatoire
- Established: 15 October 1910; 115 years ago
- Location: Rue Charles-Galland 2 Geneva 1206; Switzerland
- Coordinates: 46°11′57″N 6°09′06″E
- Type: Art museum
- Collection size: 650'000+ objects
- Visitors: 246'837 (2024)
- Director: Marc-Olivier Wahler
- Public transit access: Geneva City Bus: Lines 3 and 5 stop Athénée; line 7 stop Musée d'art et d'histoire; line 92 stop Saint-Antoine; lines 1 and 8 stop Florissant; Geneva City Tramway: stop Rive; Léman Express: L1 L2 L3 L4 L7 trains at Genève-Champel
- Website: mah.ch

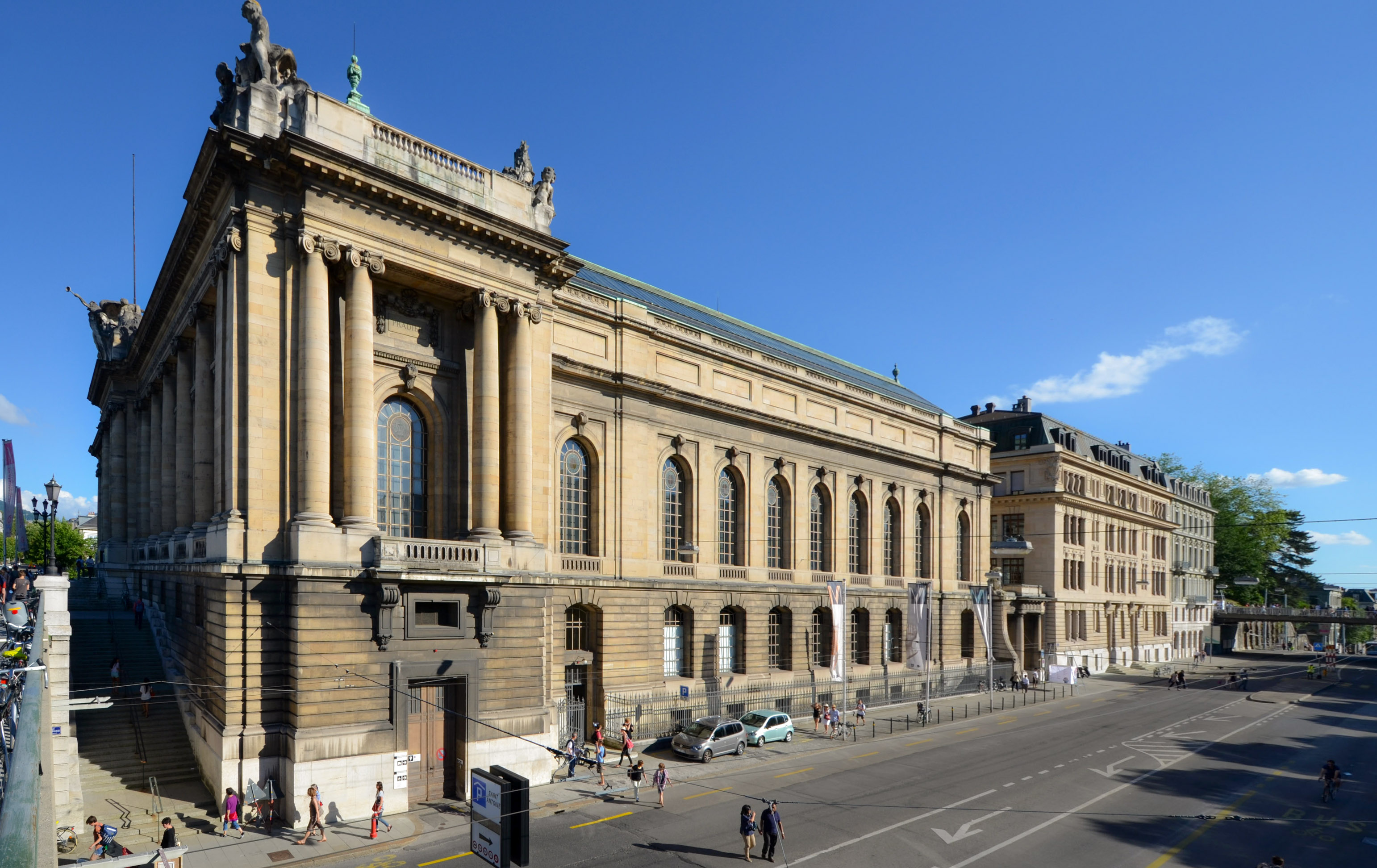
North-West Façade of the Musée d'Art et d'Histoire

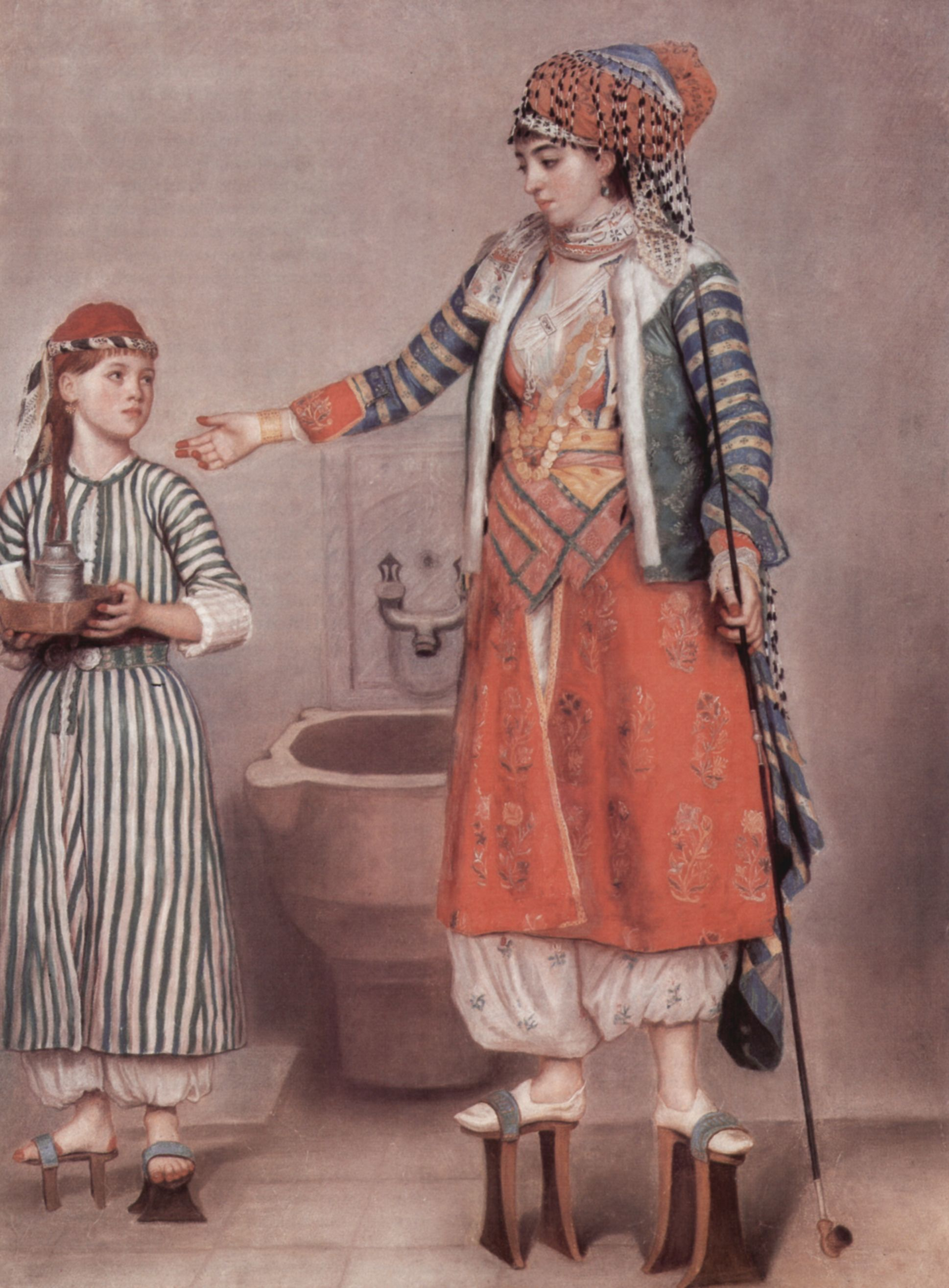
Turkish Lady with Maid by Jean-Étienne Liotard.

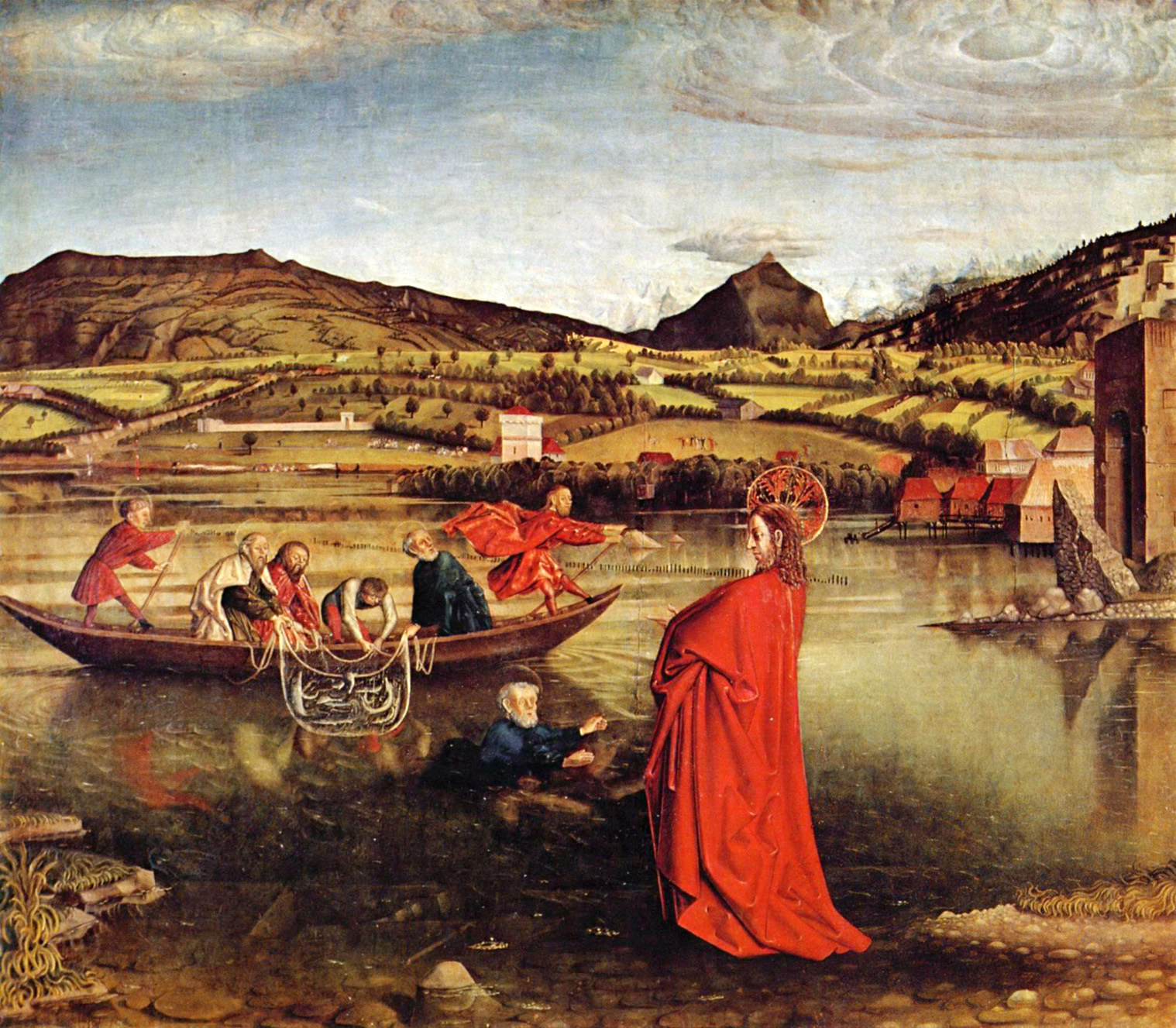
The Miraculous Draught of Fishes by Konrad Witz.

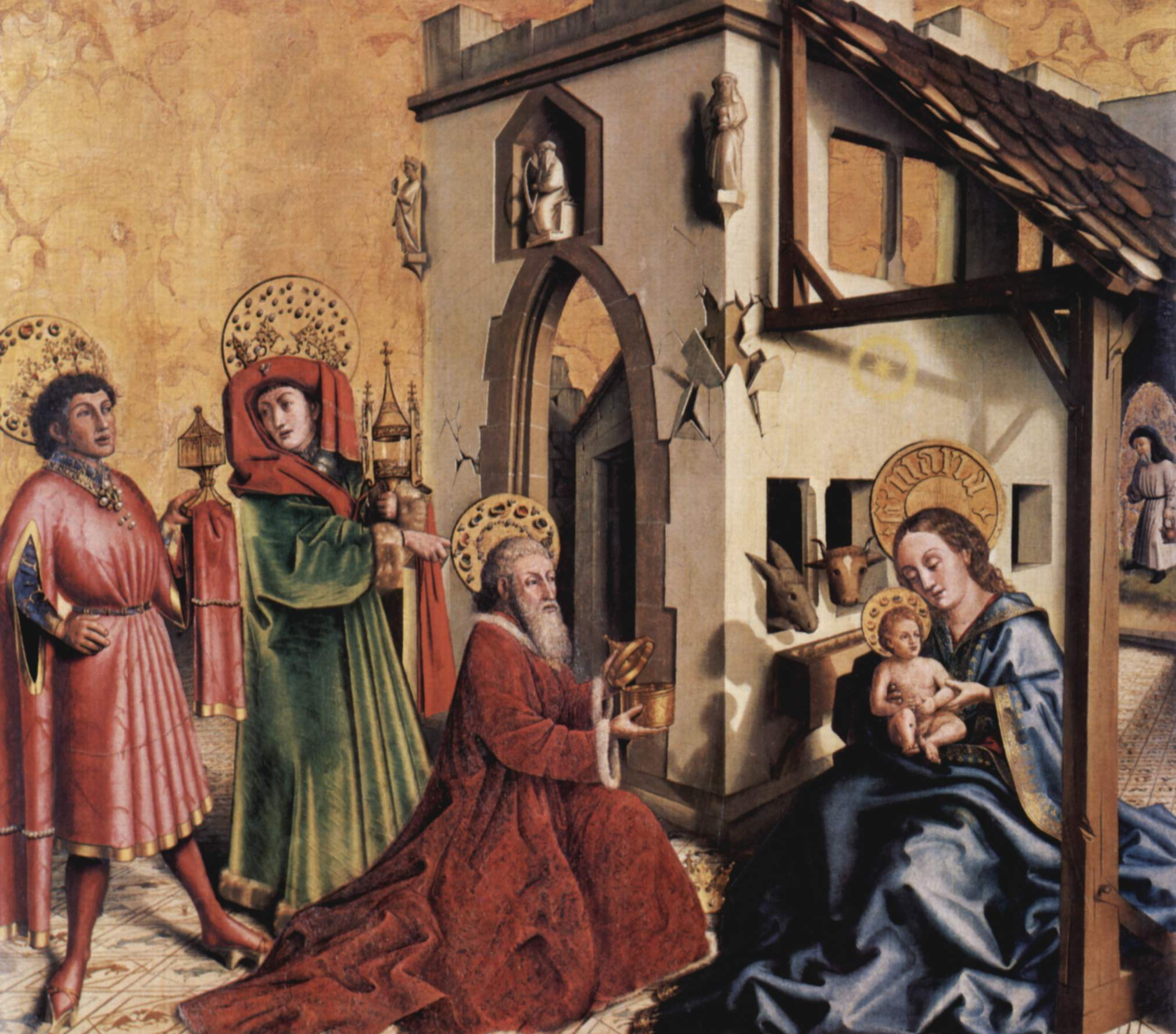
The Adoration of the Magi by Konrad Witz.

The Musée d'art et d'histoire (French: [myze daʁ e distwaʁ də ʒənɛv]; Museum of Art and History; MAH) is an encyclopedic art museum located in Geneva, Switzerland. Its collection comprises more than 650,000 objects spanning archaeology, applied arts, horology, the holdings of the Art and Archaeology Library, and fine and graphic arts, making it one of the largest museum collections in Switzerland.

The museum heads the association for all art and historical museums in the city of Geneva, the Musées d'Art et d'Histoire. The other museums in this group are the Cabinet des Estampes (graphics), the Musée Ariana (porcelain), the Musée Rath (special exhibitions), the Maison Tavel (history of Geneva), and the Musée de l'Horlogerie et de l'Émaillerie (timepieces and enamels). The group also includes an art restoration studio, research laboratories, and an art and archaeology library with 400,000 books.

== History ==
The museum as an institution dates back to 1826 and the Musée des Beaux-Arts, which opened in what is now the Musée Rath. The Musée Académique, whose exhibits covered natural history and archaeology, had also been recently founded (in 1818). The Musée des Beaux-Arts was acquired by the city of Geneva in 1851, which also received the State of Geneva's weapons collection and historical artefacts in 1870.

In the second half of the 19th century these various collections were enlarged through donations, making new exhibition rooms necessary. In 1897 the Société Auxiliaire du Musée de Genève was founded with the aim of creating a new museum. In 1900 the city of Geneva held an architecture competition to design a new building. The Musée d’Art et d’Histoire was finally built from 1903 to 1910 thanks to the bequest from Charles Galland. However, parts of the collection soon had to be sent out to new museums due to a lack of space.

== The building ==
The museum is located in Les Tranchées, in the city centre, on the site of the former fortification ring. It was built by the architect Marc Camoletti between 1903 and 1910, and financed by a bequest from the banker Charles Galland (1816–1901). The building is square, with 60 m (200 ft) sides surrounding an inner courtyard. It has four storeys, with roof lanterns on the top floor, and a total exhibition space of 7,000 m² (75,000 square feet).

The façade is decorated with sculptures by Paul Amlehn: an allegory of the arts, depicting painting, sculpture, drawing and architecture, is mounted on the triangular gable above the entrance, and two more allegories, of archaeology and applied art, can be seen in the left- and right-hand corners of the building respectively. The upper frieze includes the names of Genevan artists: Dassier, Baud-Bovy, Saint-Ours, Agasse, Töpffer, Liotard, Calame, Diday, Menn, Petitot, Arlaud and Pradier.

== Departments ==
=== Department of Fine Art ===
The fine art section has paintings from the Middle Ages to the 20th century, with works by the Italian, Dutch, French, English, Genevan and Swiss Schools. The best-known painting is "The Miraculous Draft of Fishes" (1444) by Konrad Witz, contained in Witz's St. Peter Altarpiece. Other major artists include Rembrandt, Cézanne, Modigliani, and the sculptor Rodin. The museum also has numerous works by Jean-Étienne Liotard, Ferdinand Hodler, Félix Vallotton, Edmond Jean de Pury, and Jean-Baptiste-Camille Corot. The collection of works by the Genevan Neoclassical painter Jean-Pierre Saint-Ours (d. 1809) is much the best of any museum.

=== Department of Works on Paper ===
The Department of Works on Paper is one of the museum's major holdings and covers drawings, prints and illustrated books from the 15th century onward. It includes the world's largest collection of works by Jean-Étienne Liotard and a major group of works by Ferdinand Hodler, whose 241 sketchbooks in the MAH represent almost the entire known corpus. The department also holds an important collection of Japanese prints, including a set of 300 sheets acquired in 1937, with works by artists including Katsushika Hokusai, Utagawa Hiroshige, Kitagawa Utamaro, Utagawa Kunisada and Kōshirō Onchi.

=== Department of Applied Arts ===
The applied art section has collections of Byzantine art, icons, weapons from the Middle Ages and Renaissance, silverware and tinware, musical instruments and textiles. The complete interior furnishing and wood panelling from several rooms of the Lower Castle Zizers (late 17th century) have been built into the museum.

=== Department of Archeology ===
The archaeology section displays findings from European prehistory, ancient Egypt (with a mummy from the 9th century BC), the Kerma culture of Sudan, the Near East, ancient Greece, and Roman and pre-Roman Italy, as well as a numismatic cabinet.

=== Department of Watchmaking, Enamelling, Jewellery, Miniatures ===
The department of watchmaking, enamelling, jewellery and miniatures preserves more than 20,000 objects, forming a heritage tied to Geneva's international image. Covering Genevan production as well as works made elsewhere in Switzerland and Europe since the 16th century, the collection places watchmaking and related crafts in their economic, social, cultural and historical context. Notable holdings include painted enamel miniatures by Jean Petitot and Jean-Étienne Liotard

== Selected paintings ==
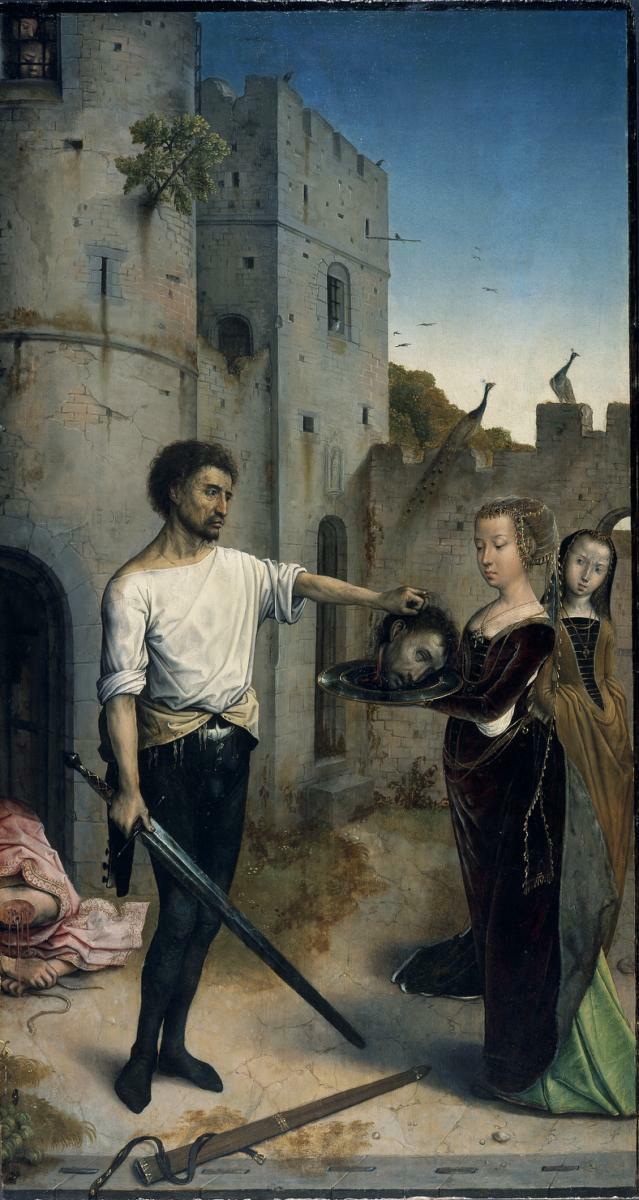
Juan de Flandes, Decollation of Saint John the Baptist, c. 1496–1499

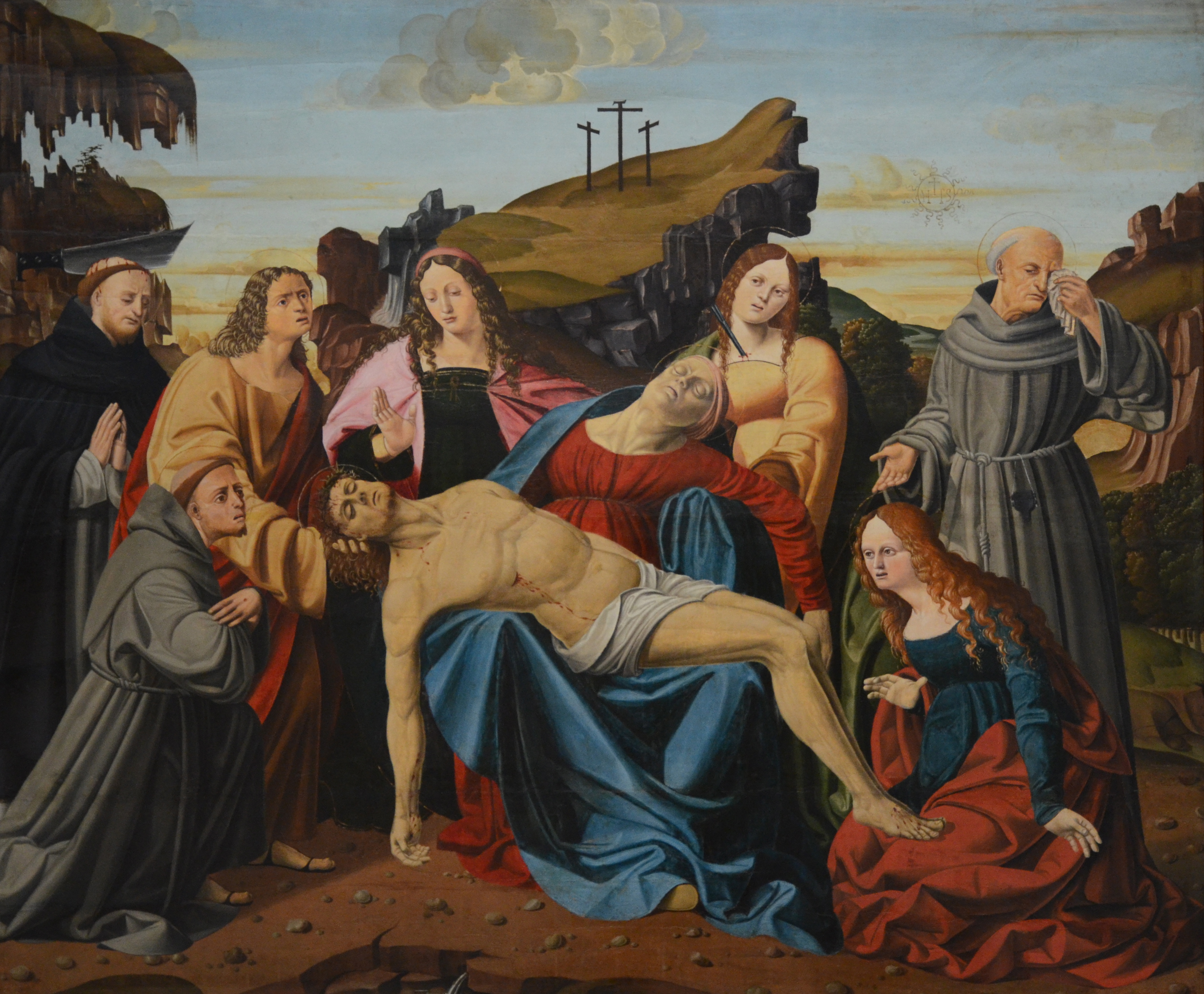
Alvise Donati, Deploration of Christ, c. 1515

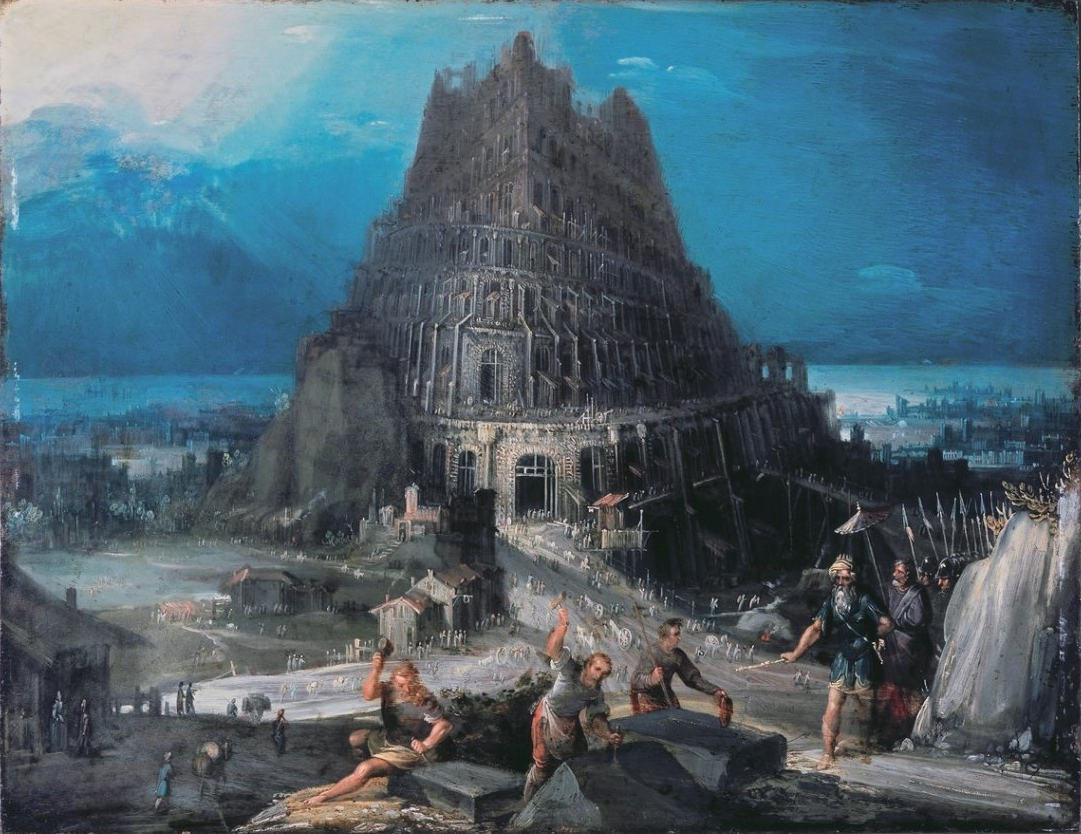
Circle of Lucas van Valckenborch, The Tower of Babel, 1620

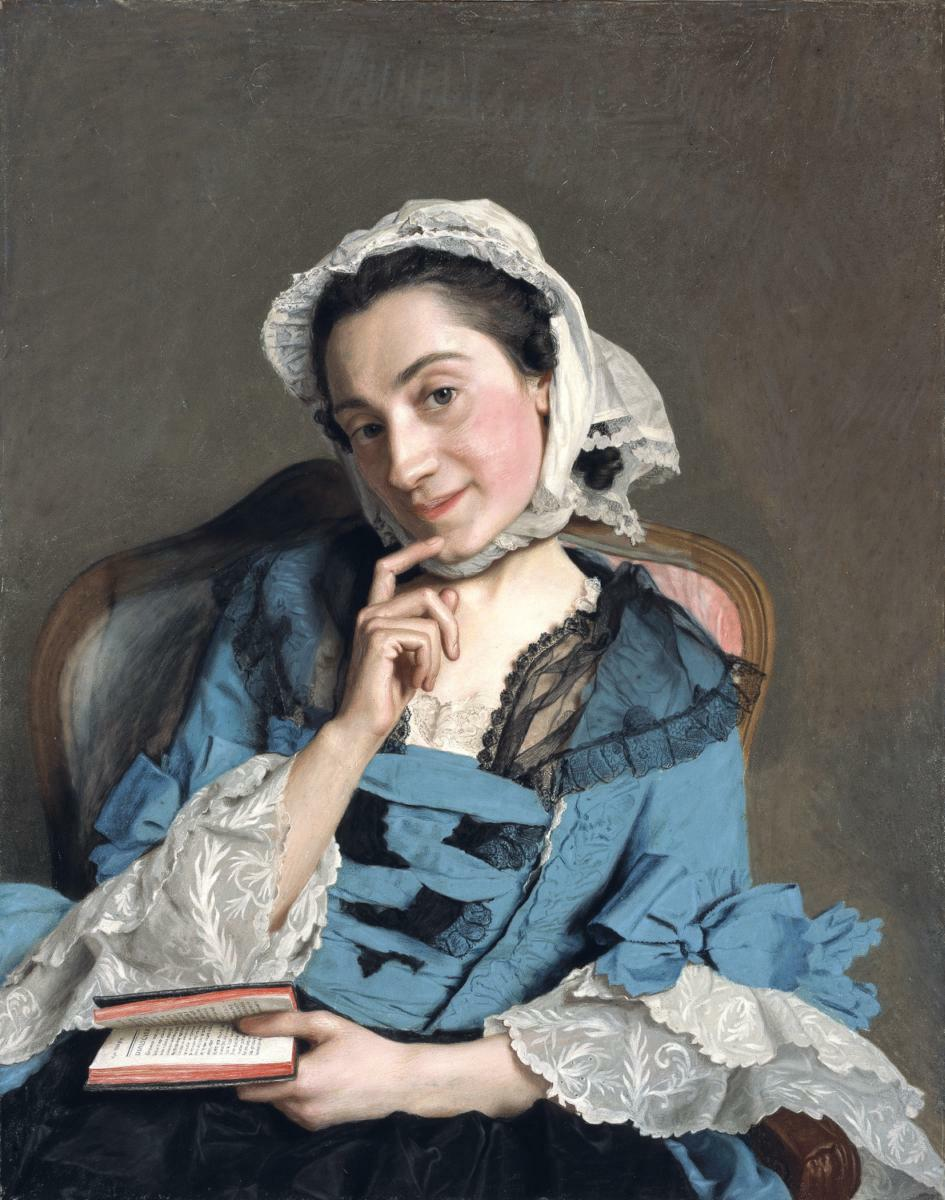
Jean-Étienne Liotard, Portrait of Mme d'Epinay, c. 1759

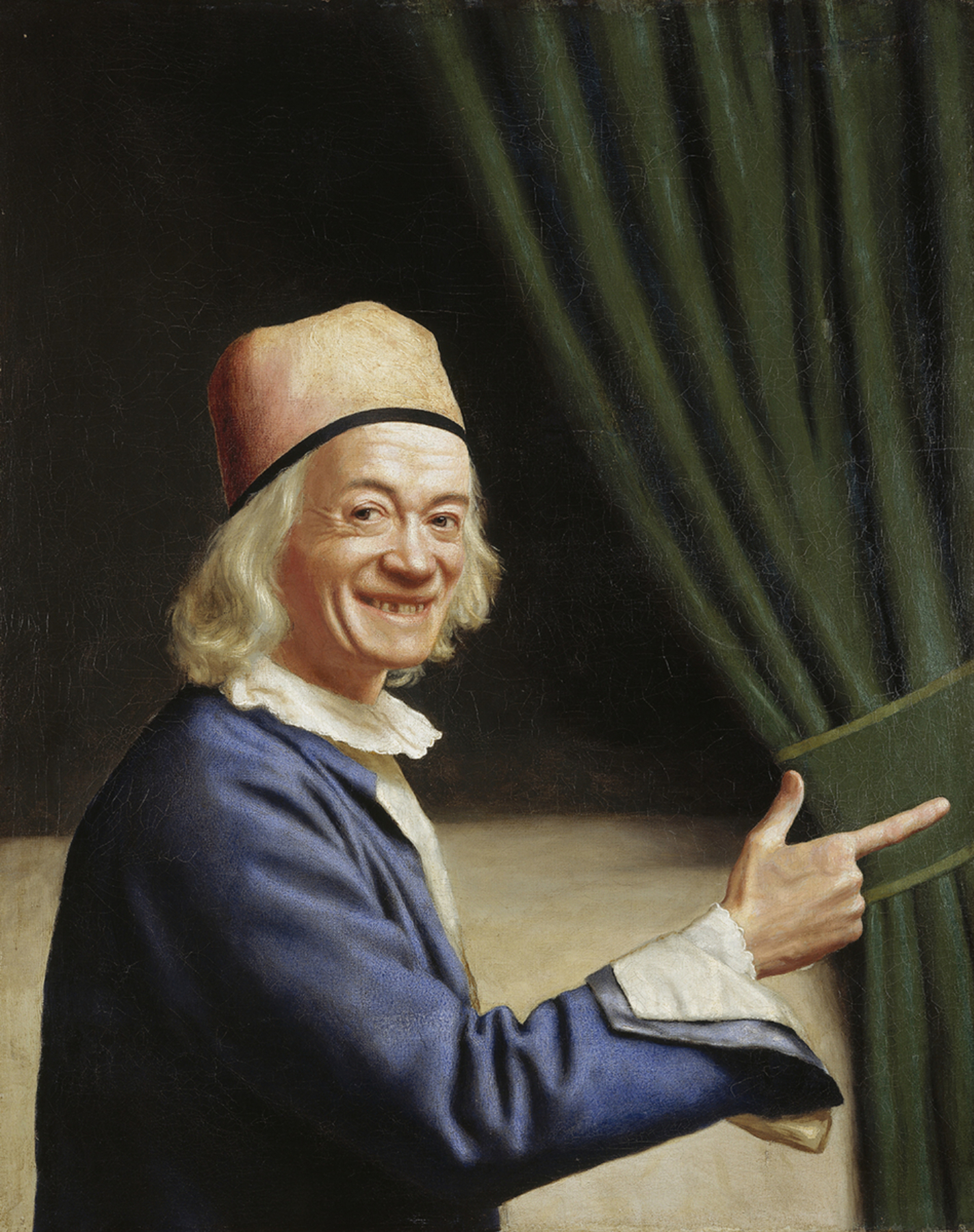
Jean-Étienne Liotard, Self-portrait of Liotard Laughing, c. 1770

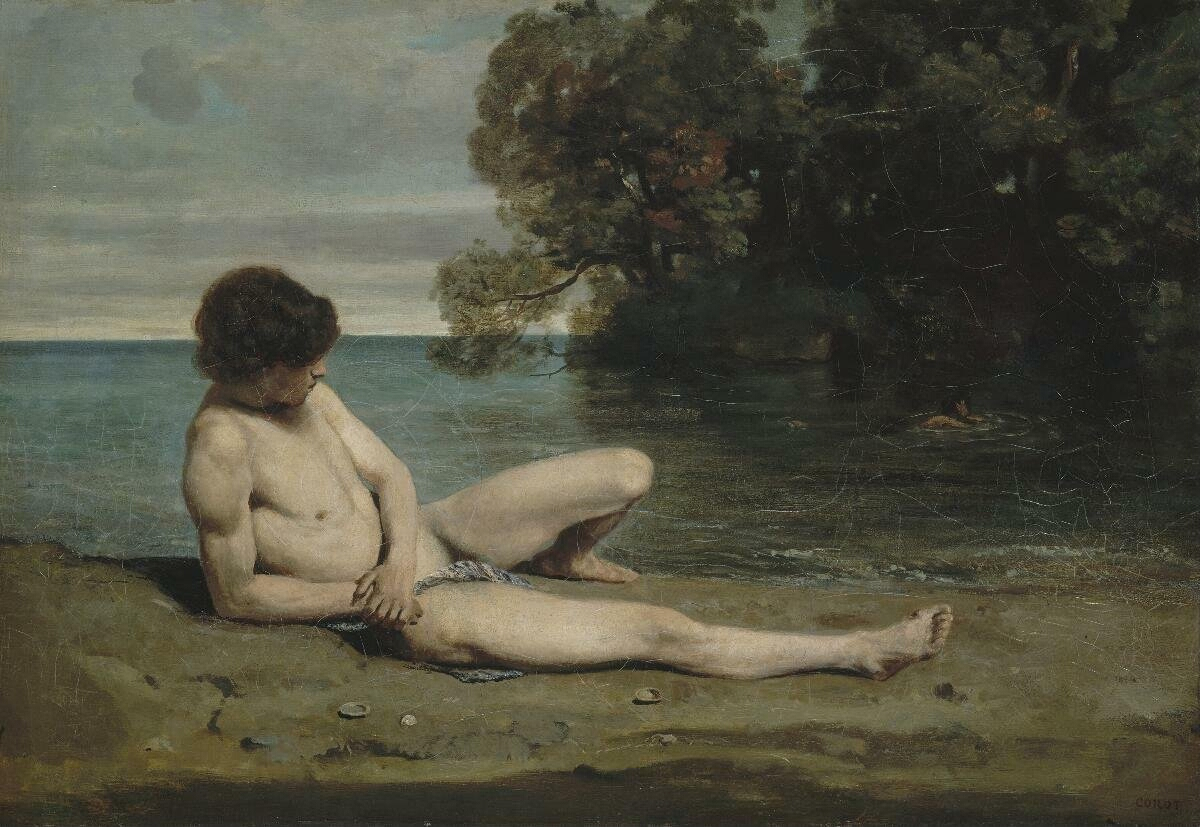
Barthélemy Menn, Young Bather Lying on the Shore, c. 1860

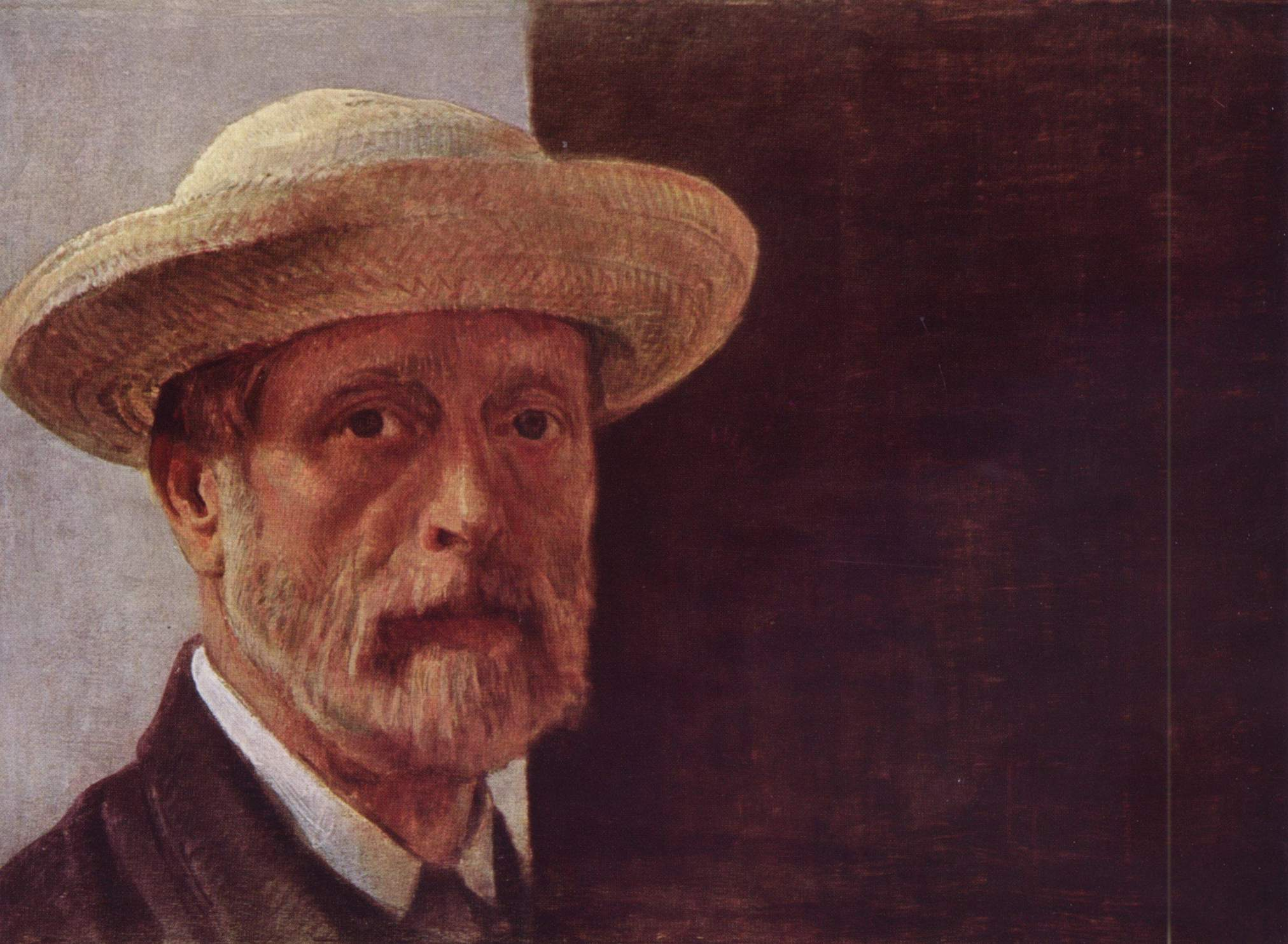
Barthélemy Menn, Self-Portrait with Straw Hat, c. 1867

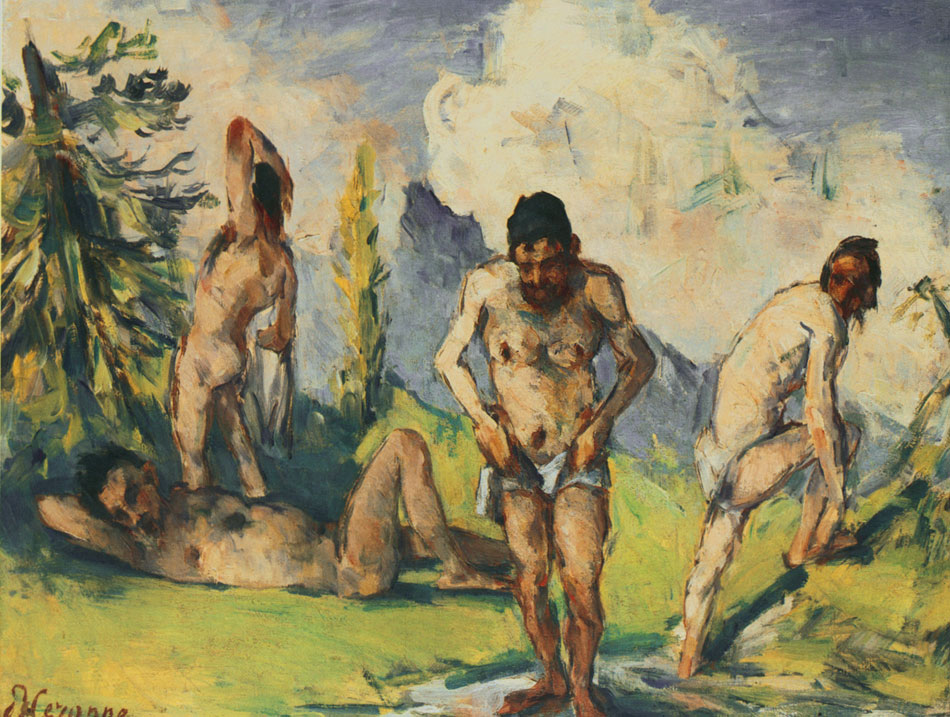
Paul Cézanne, Bathers at Rest, 1875

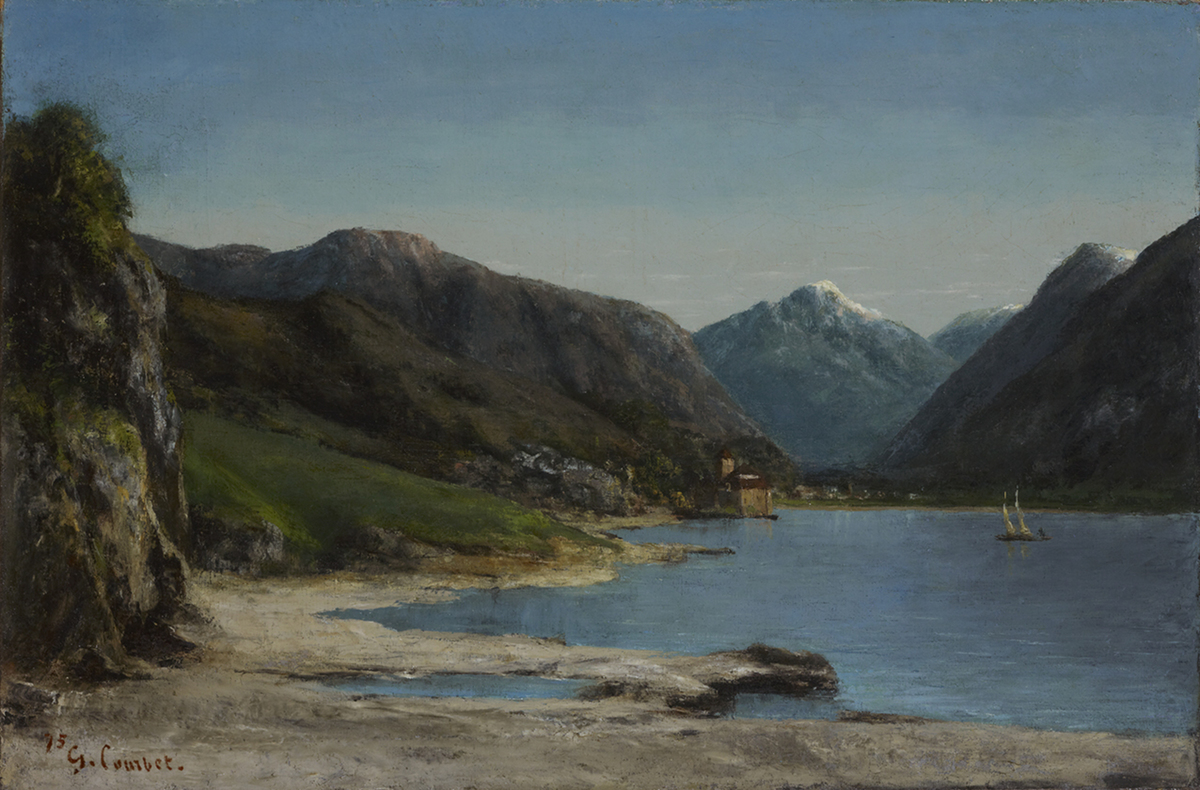
Gustave Courbet, Chillon, View from Afar, 1875

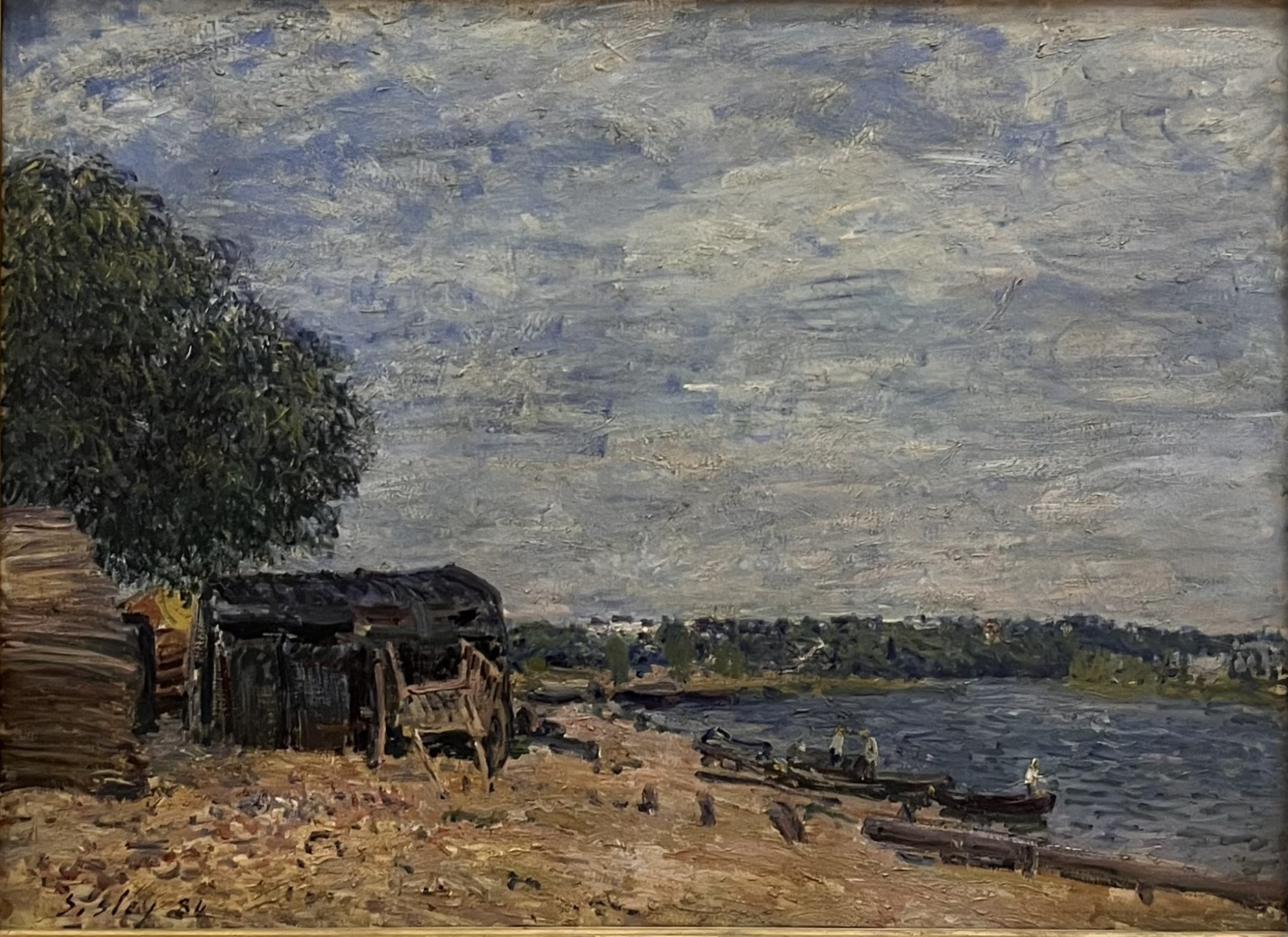
Alfred Sisley, Saint-Mammès. Landscape, 1884

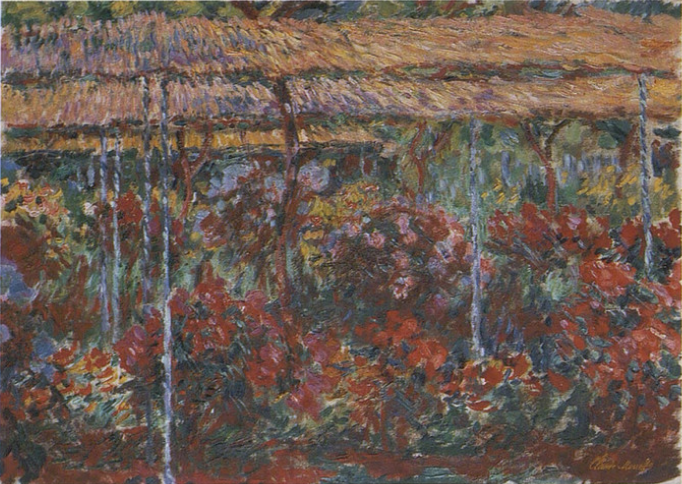
Claude Monet, Peonies, 1887

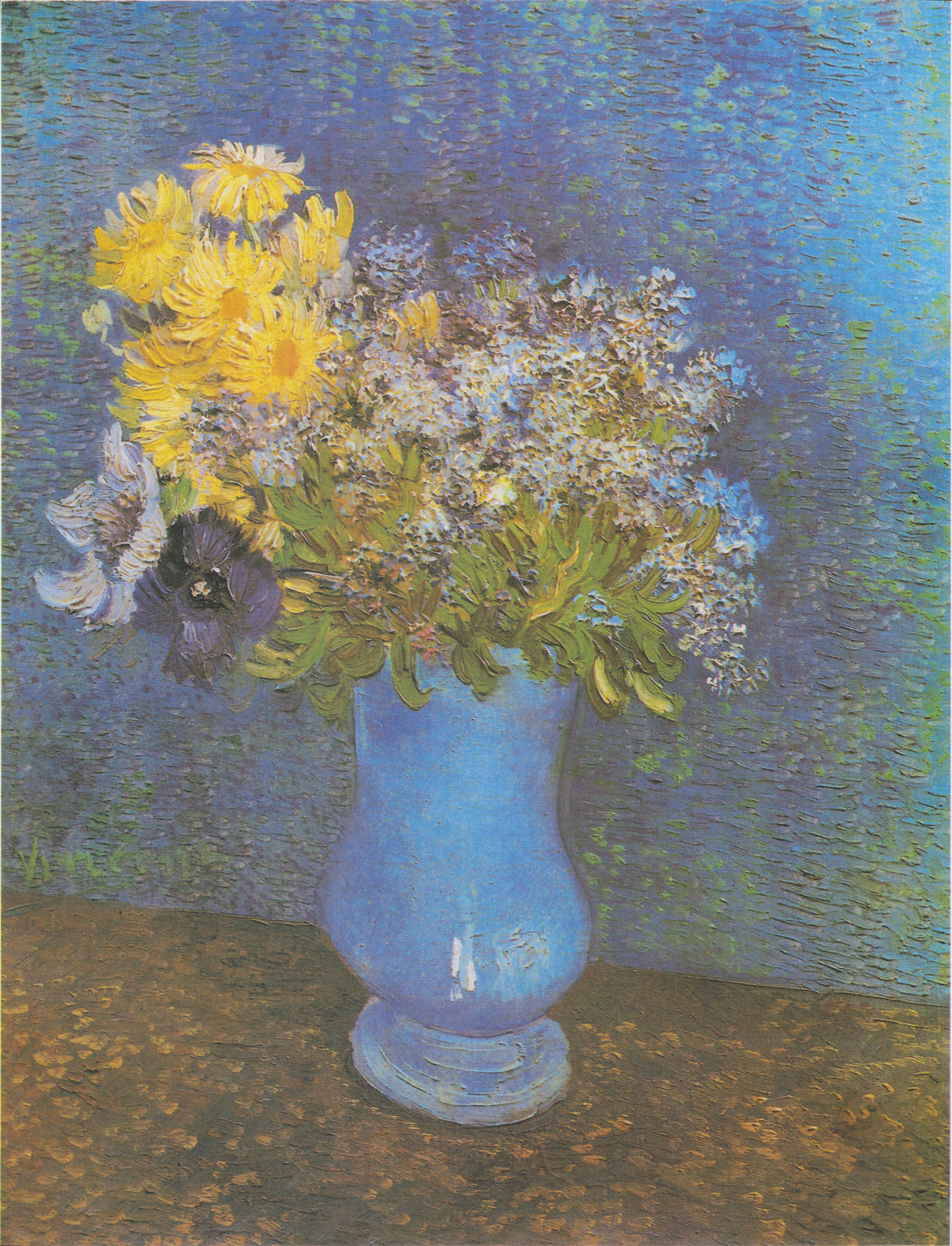
Vincent van Gogh, Vase with Lilacs, Daisies and Anemones, 1887

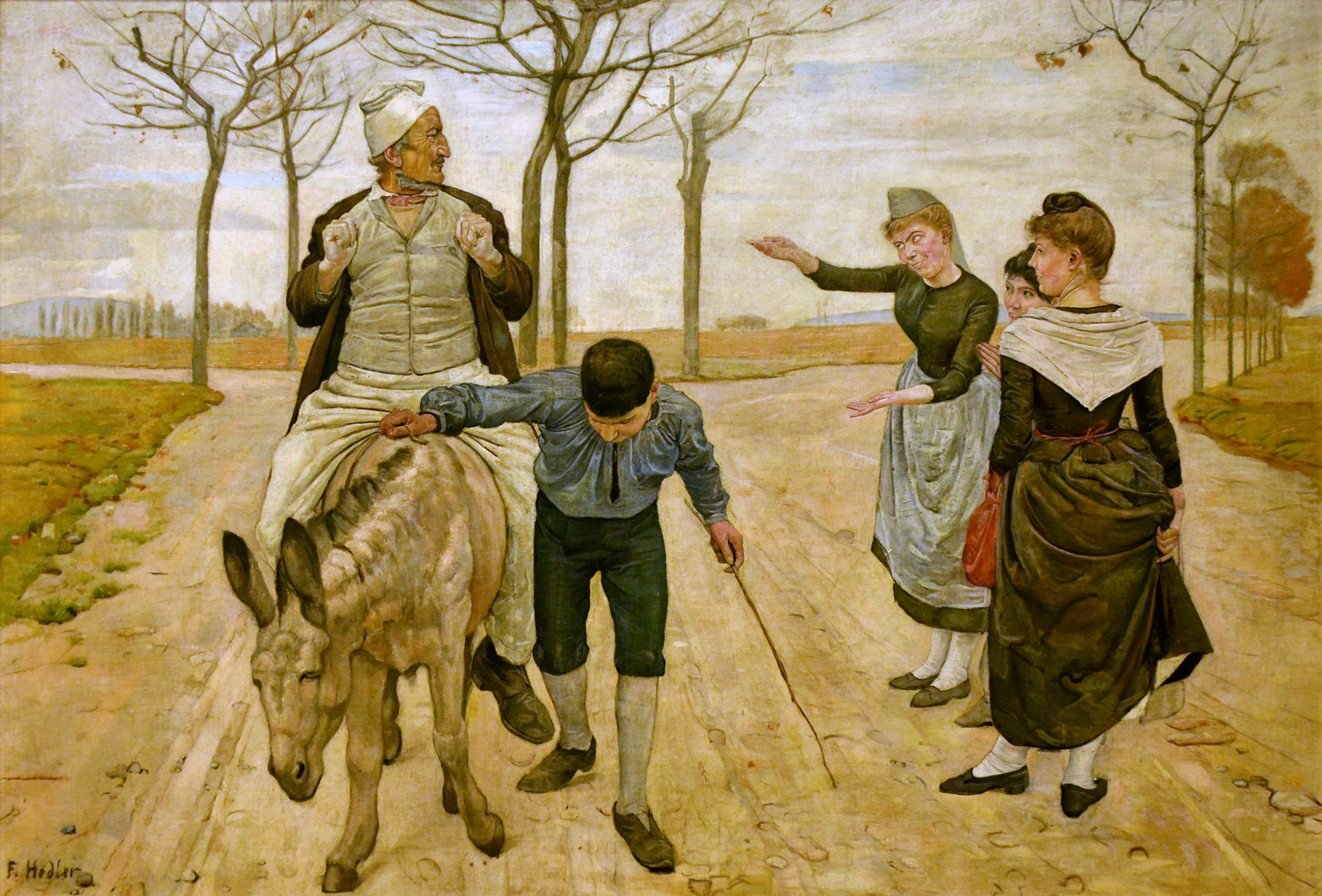
Ferdinand Hodler, The Miller, his Son and the Donkey, 1888

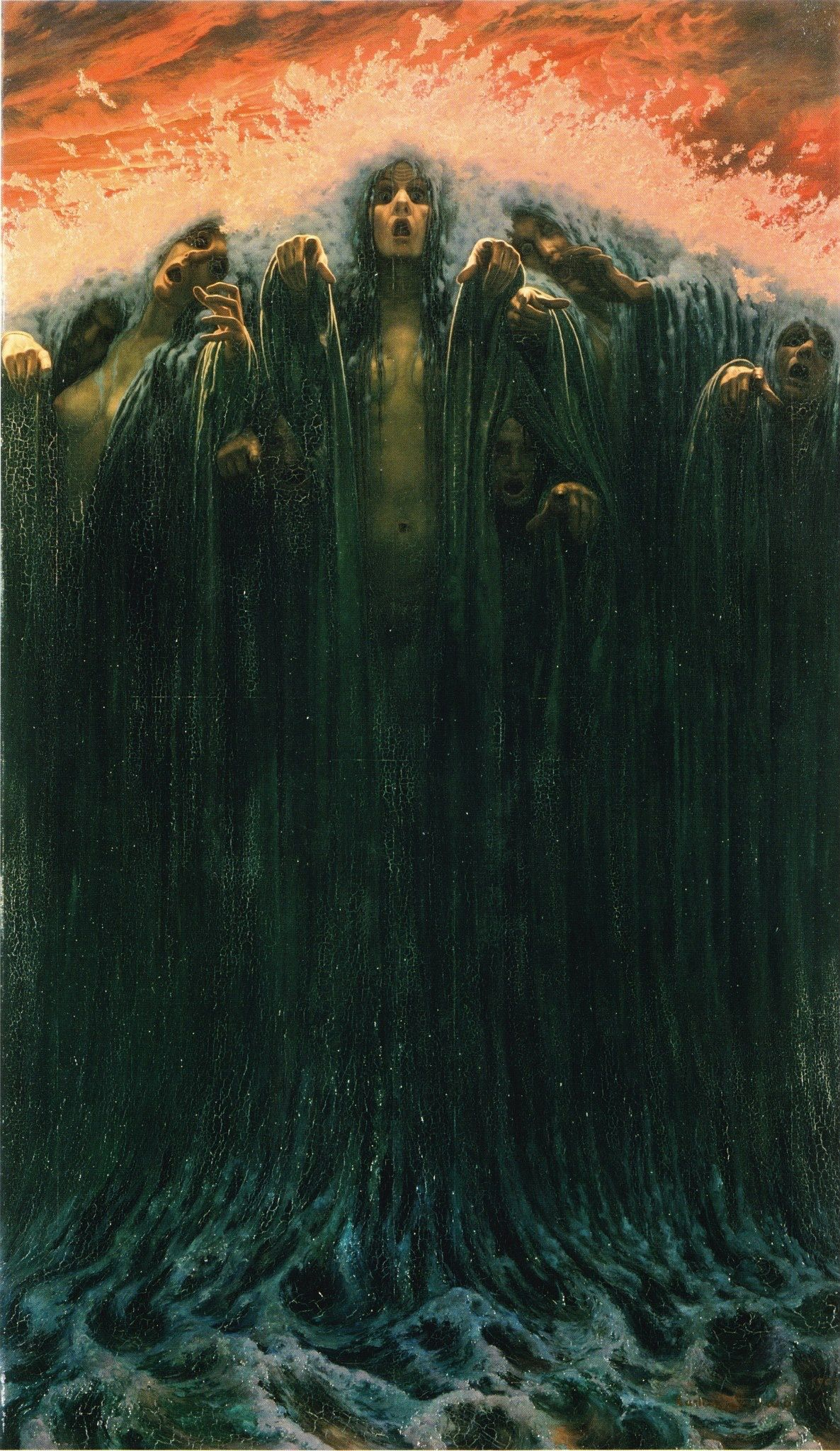
Carlos Schwabe, The Wave, 1907

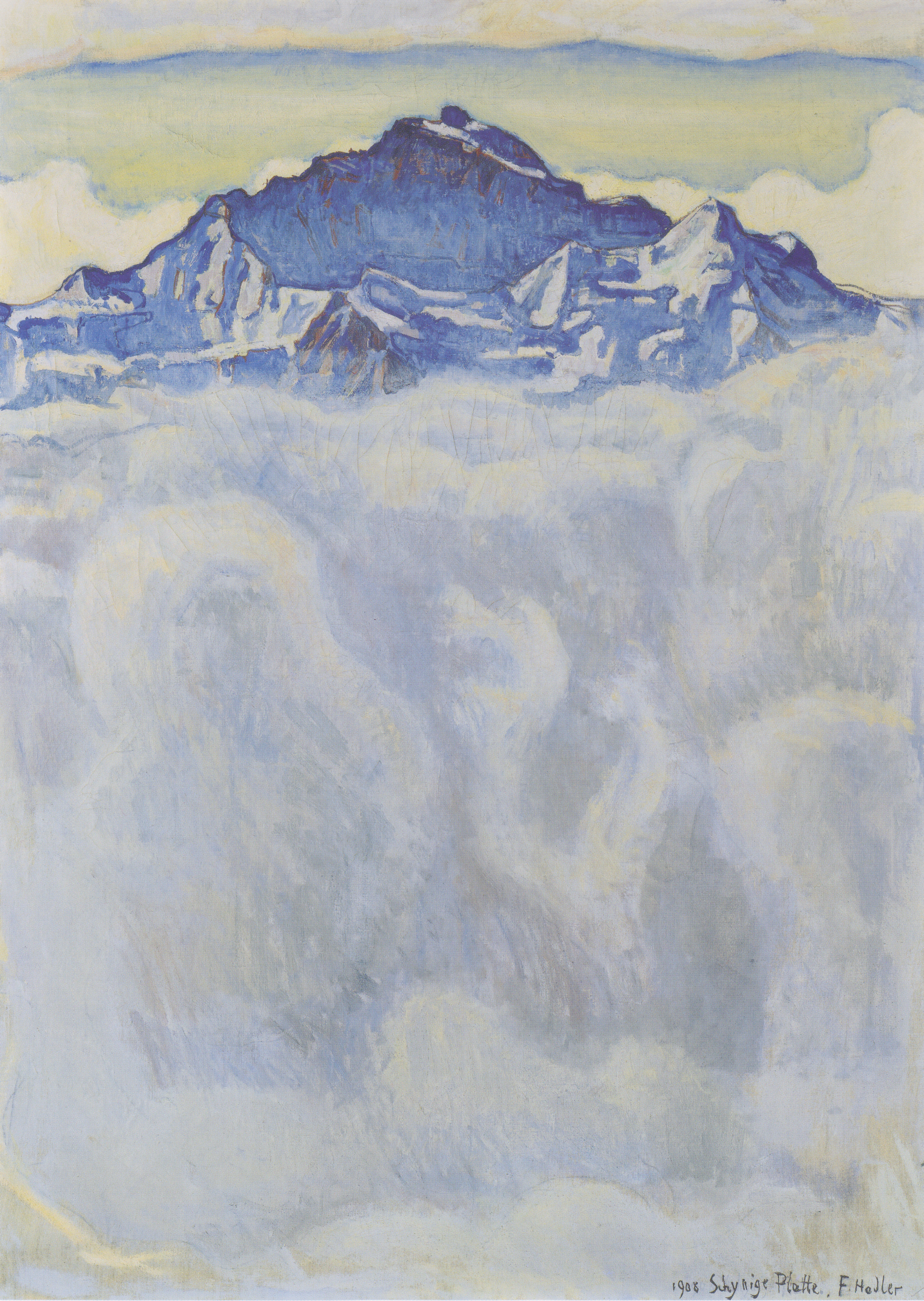
Ferdinand Hodler, The Jungfrau above the Sea of Mist, 1908

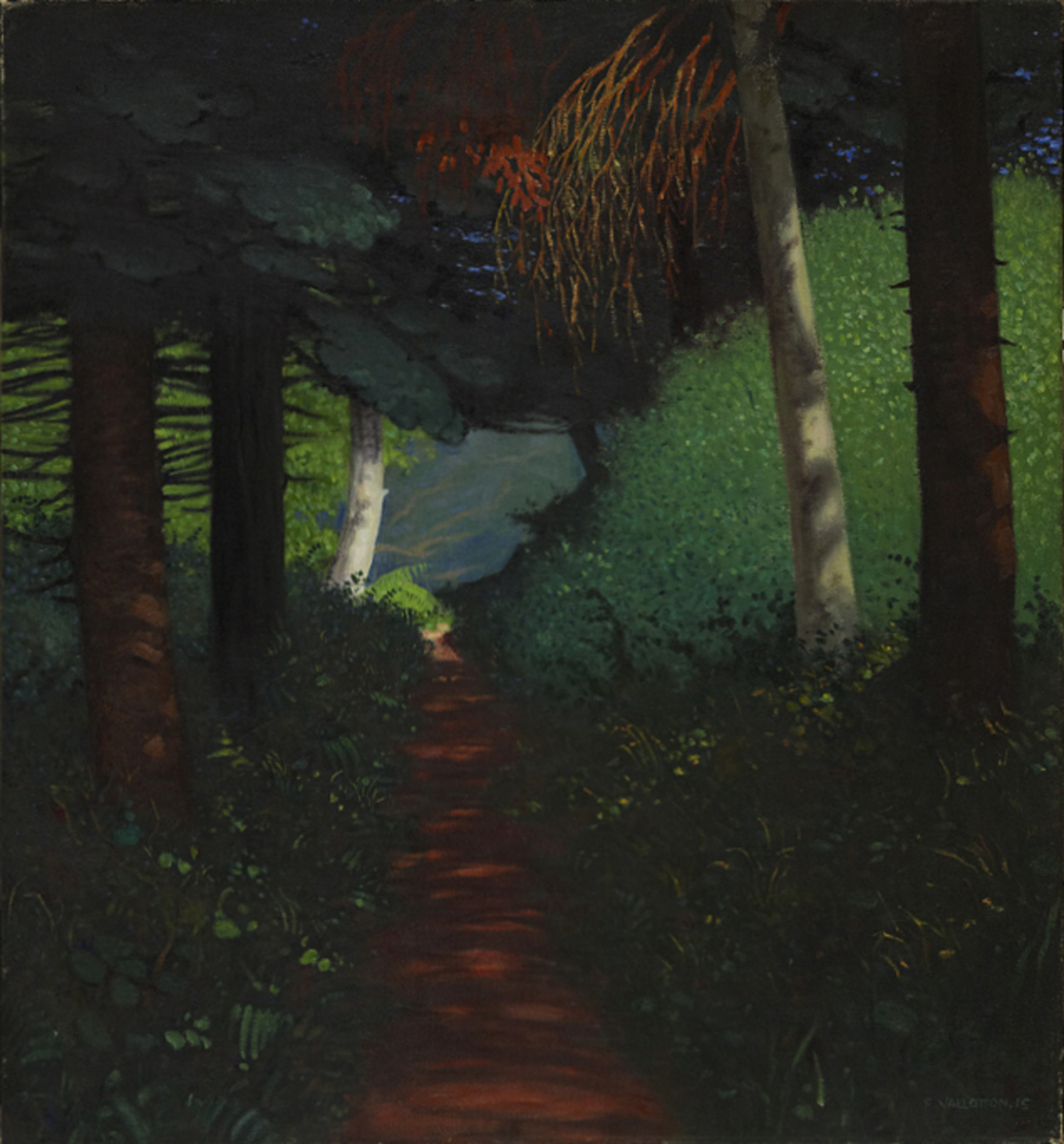
Félix Vallotton, Undergrowth, 1915

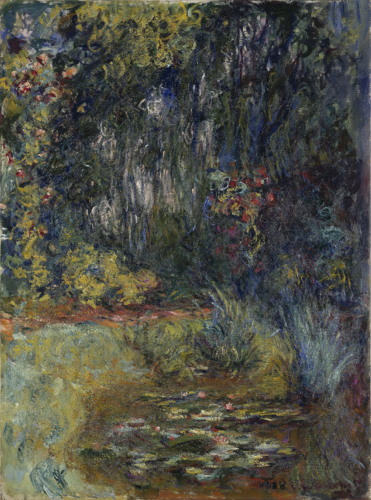
Claude Monet, Corner of the Water Lily Pond, 1918

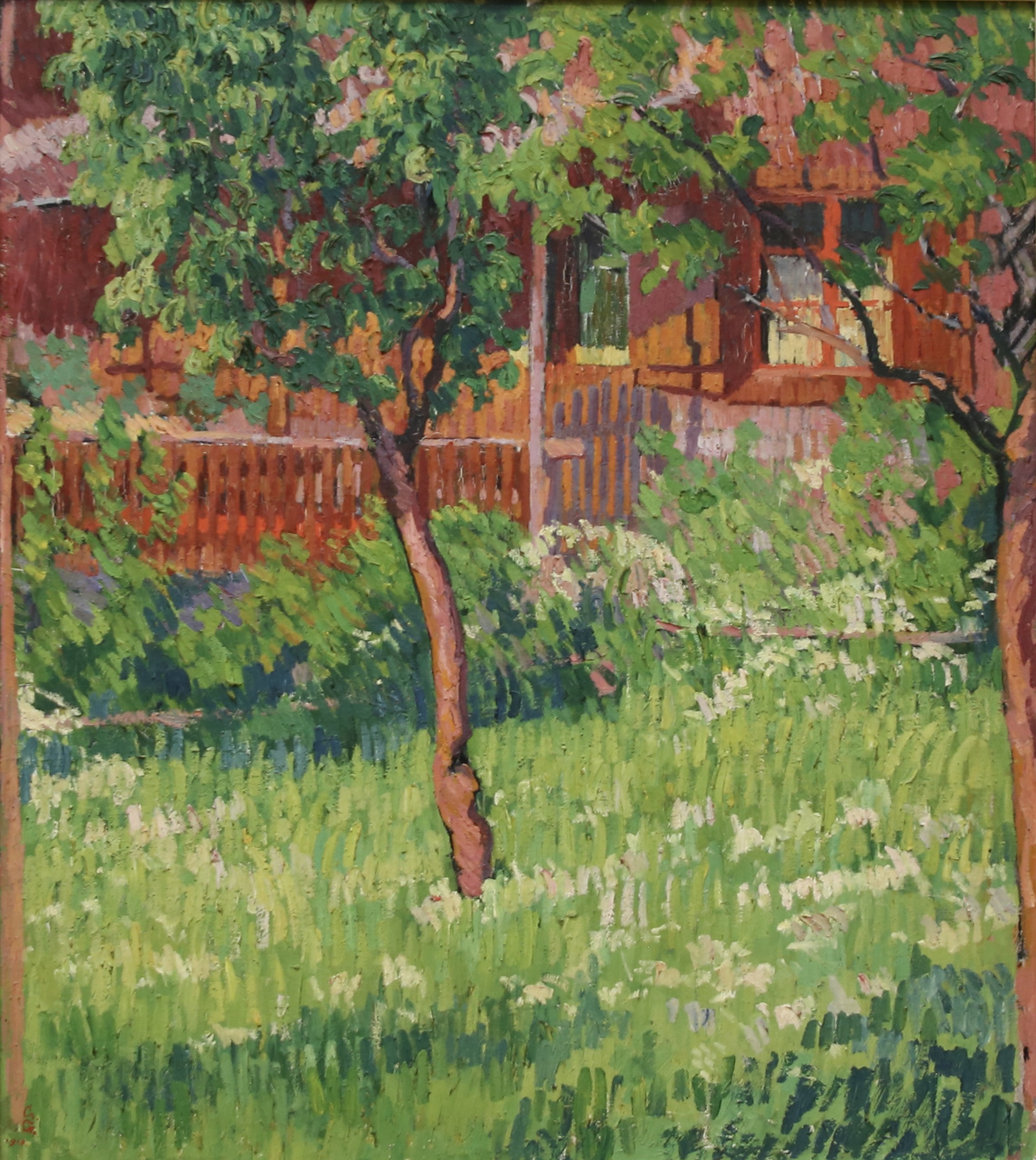
Giovanni Giacometti,The Stampa orchard, 1910

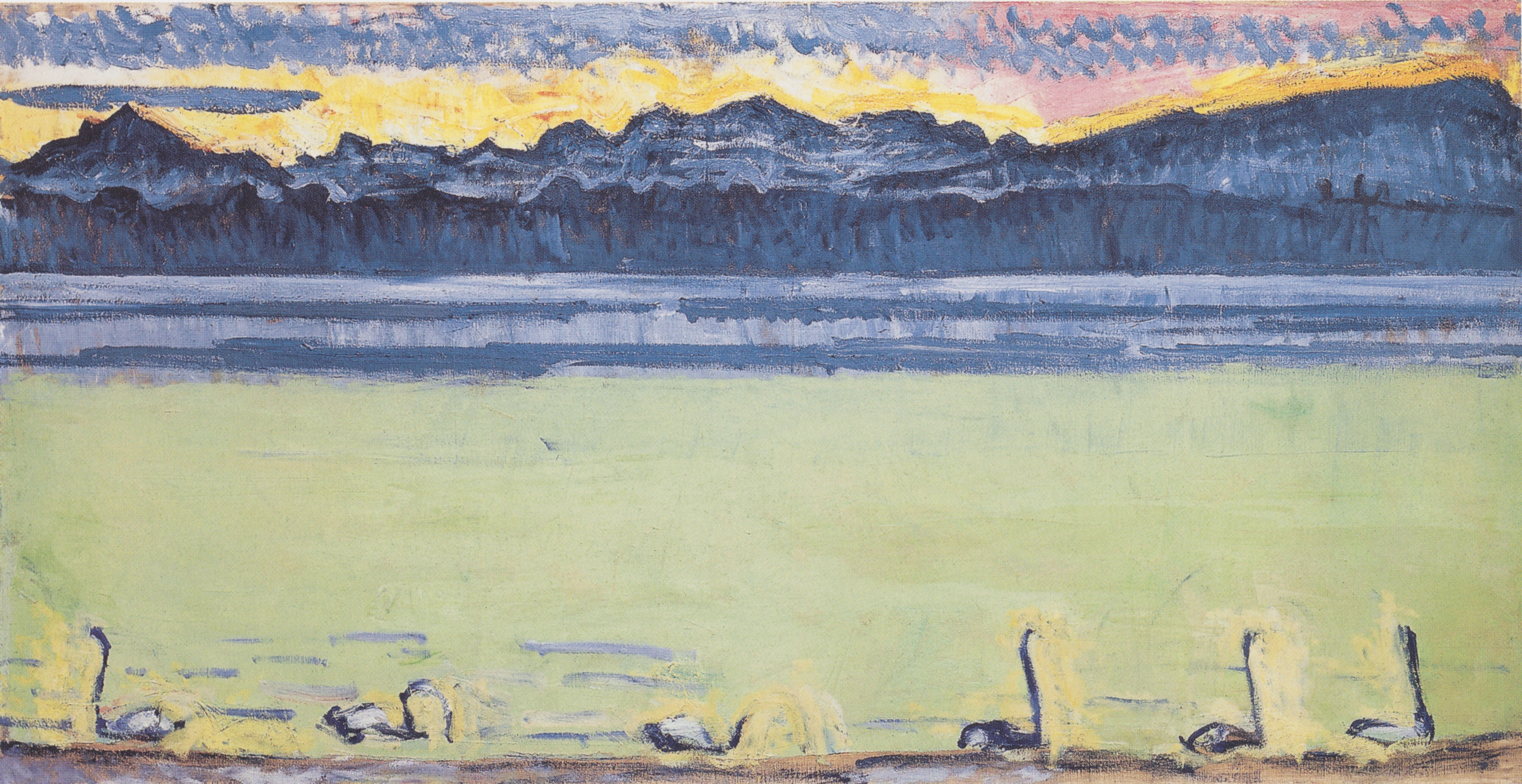
Ferdinand Hodler, Lake Geneva with Mont Blanc at Dawn, 1918

== See also ==
- List of art museums
- List of museums in Geneva
- List of museums in Switzerland
- Plainpalais
