= Musée Ariana =

Museum in Geneva (Switzerland)

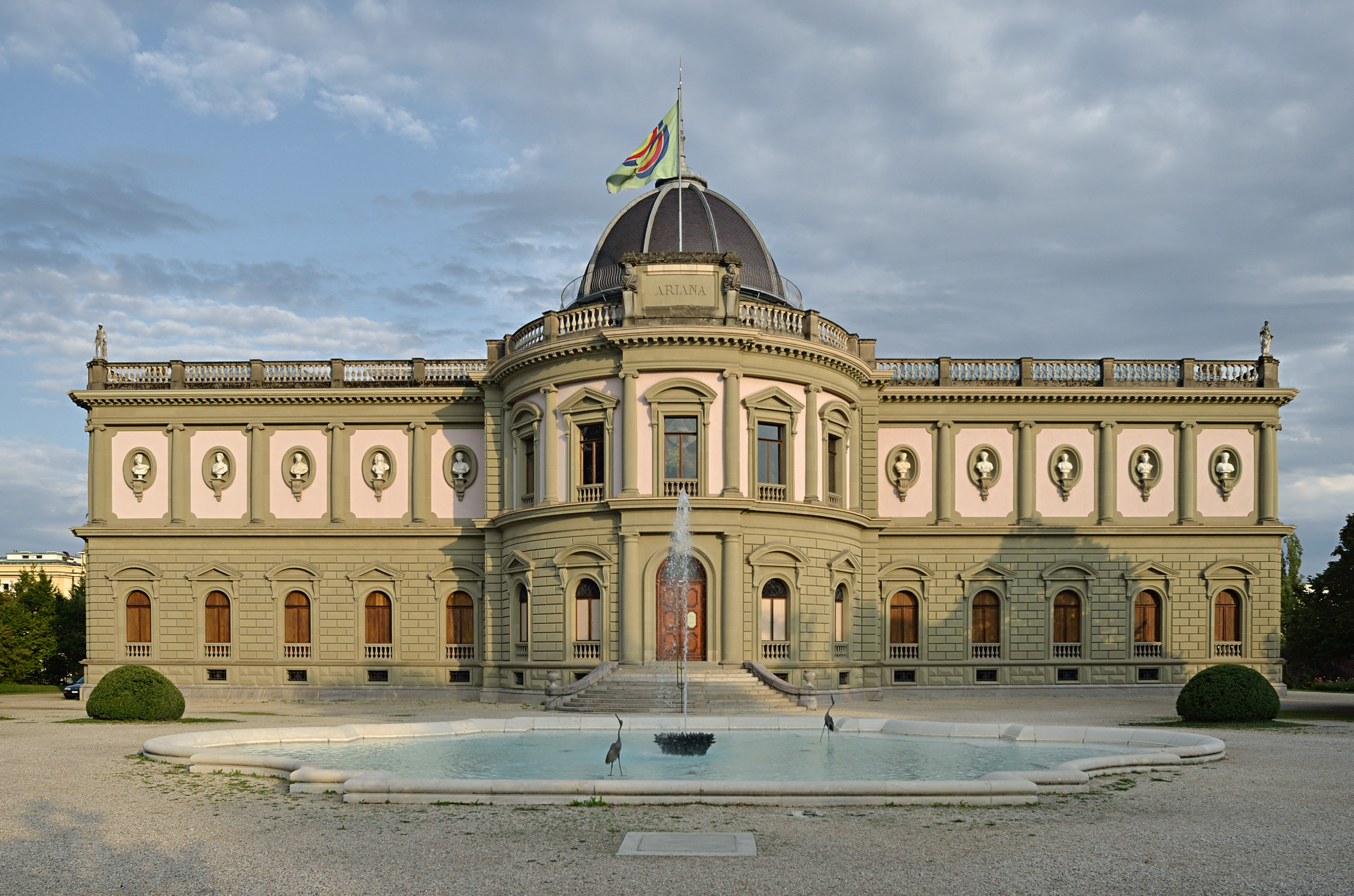
- Front view of the Musée Ariana
- Established: 8 March 1884; 142 years ago
- Location: Avenue de la Paix 10; Geneva, GE 1202; Switzerland
- Coordinates: 46°13′31″N 6°08′20″E
- Type: Art museum
- Collections: Art glass and ceramic art
- Collection size: 28'000+ objects
- Visitors: 67'008 (2024)
- Director: Bertrand Mazeirat
- Public transit access: Bus: Line 51 stop Ariana; lines 8, 20, 22, 60 and 61 stops Appia and Nations; Tramway: stop Nations; Léman Express: L1 L2 L3 L4 trains at Genève-Sécheron
- Website: www.musee-ariana.ch

The Musée Ariana, also known as the Musée suisse de la céramique et du verre (Swiss Museum of Ceramics and Glass), is a museum in Geneva, Switzerland. It is devoted to ceramic and glass artwork, and contains around 20,000 objects from the last 1,200 years, representing the historic, geographic, artistic and technological breadth of glass and ceramic manufacture during this time. The collection is the only one of its kind in Switzerland.

Built between 1877 and 1884, the museum is shaped by Neo-Classical and Neo-Baroque elements and is situated on Avenue de la Paix, near the Palace of Nations. It was built to house the private collection of the Swiss art collector and patron Gustave Revilliod, who named it after his mother, Ariane de la Rive, and later bequeathed it to the city of Geneva. Since 1934 the museum has been a member of Geneva's association of art and history museums, Les Musées d'art et d'histoire Geneve, led by the Musée d'Art et d'Histoire. Subsequently, parts of the collection have been dispatched to other museums while the Musée Ariana has acquired new exhibits in exchange, in order to focus the collection on glass and ceramics.

In 1993 the museum was reopened after 12 years of building work.

== See also ==
- List of museums in Switzerland
