= Politics in the canton of Geneva =

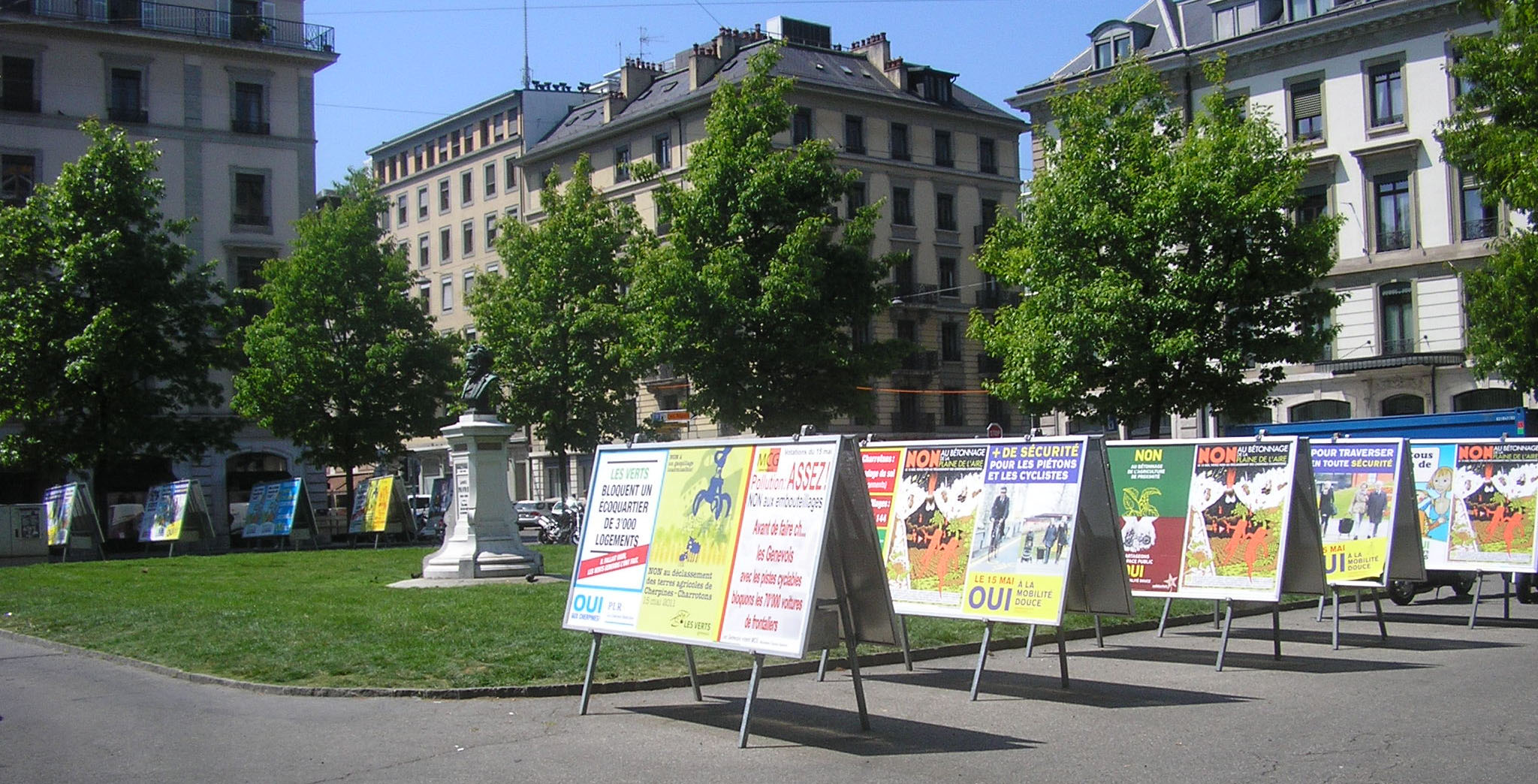
Election posters in Geneva in 2011, Place des Alpes.

Swiss federalism gives Swiss cantons a great deal of autonomy. As such, each canton has its own constitution. Political rights in particular can vary quite significantly from one canton to another, and even from one municipality to another (e.g., voting rights for foreigners).

The cantons also levy taxes. The cantons have broad powers in the areas of education and training, health, social welfare, the organization of the justice system, policing, and transportation. The cantons also levy taxes and duties.

The constitution of the canton of Geneva differs from other cantons in that it can be amended in part. In contrast, the constitutions of other cantons generally have to be revised in their entirety. Thanks to this difference, modern legal principles (e.g., the right to housing) have been incorporated into a structure dating back almost a century and a half, namely the 1847 constitution. However, for the sake of clarity and readability, a complete revision of the text was put to a popular vote in February 2008. The principle was accepted, and on October 19, 2008, the Geneva Constituent Assembly was elected to draft a new constitution for the canton. Accepted in a referendum on October 14, 2012, by 54.1% of voters, the new constitution came into force on June 1, 2013.

== Authorities ==
=== Legislative power ===
Legislative power is exercised by the Grand Council. It is composed of 100 deputies elected directly by the electorate using a proportional representation system tempered by a 7% quorum. Their term of office has been five years since the new constitution came into force in 2013. It was previously four years (three years until 1957) and is renewable indefinitely. Nevertheless, internal rules within several political parties limit the number of consecutive terms that may be served.

The Grand Council is responsible for passing laws in all areas of cantonal jurisdiction and for approving the state budget and accounts. Furthermore, it exercises supreme oversight over the administration of the executive branch. Geneva is one of the few cantons in which each representative has the right to initiate legislation. Thus, each representative may submit a fully drafted bill to the legislature.

The Grand Council is assisted by a sergeant-at-arms.

==== Elections ====
2 April 2023

In the first round, the population renewed its parliament, among other things. Following the elections of 2 April 2023, the Genevan Grand Council for the second legislature (2023–2028) is composed as follows:

Results of the first round (turnout 37.14%, 99,742 valid votes out of 275,893 registered electors, 7% quorum, 100 seats to be filled):

Parties	Votes	Percentage of votes	+/-	Seats	+/-
Liberal-Radical Party (PLR)	17,281	19.02%	▼6.16	22 / 100	▼6
Socialist Party (PS)	13,257	14.65%	▼0.65	18 / 100	▲1
The Greens (PES)	11,798	12.93%	▼0.22	15 / 100	0
Geneva Citizens' Movement (MCG)	10,603	11.72%	▲2.29	14 / 100	▲3
Swiss People's Party (UDC)	9,677	10.69%	▲3.37	12 / 100	▲4
Liberté et Justice Sociale (LJS)	7,823	8.45%	▲8.45	10 / 100	▲10
The Centre (LC)	7,057	7.88%	▼2.83	9 / 100	▼3

Initial composition (legislature 2018–2023)

Initial composition (legislature 2013–2018)

Initial composition (legislature 2009–2013)

Initial composition (legislature 2005–2009)

Initial composition (legislature 2001–2005)

Initial composition (legislature 1997–2001)

=== Executive power ===
It is exercised by the Council of State, which is a college of seven members elected directly and separately by the Geneva electorate by majority vote. It is always a coalition.

Since the 2012 Constitution, the President of the Council of State, breaking with the tradition of annual rotation among its members, is appointed by the Council of State for the entire term of office (five years). The President is responsible for preparing the meetings of the Council of State, setting the agenda in collaboration with the other members of the government and the Chancellor. The president convenes any extraordinary meetings. The president also has provisional power, meaning that they can take exceptional decisions if the situation requires it, which are then formally ratified by the State Council. This presidency for the entire legislative term is uncommon in other cantonal governments; only the cantons of Basel-Stadt and Vaud have the same system.

Following the Maudet affair, on November 21, 2019, the Grand Council adopted two bills to return to the annual rotation of the presidency of the cantonal government. These bills, which affect the Geneva Constitution, must be submitted to a popular vote. Both texts were approved by voters in the September 27, 2020, referendum and are now in effect. The rotating presidency was officially reinstated on October 17, 2020.

The composition of the government for the 2023-2028 term is as follows:

Composition and evolution of the Council of State since June 1, 2023.
Identity	Party	Function	Department
Nathalie Fontanet	PLR	President since June 1, 2024	Department of Finance and Human Resources (DF)
Thierry Apothéloz	PS	Vice-President since June 1, 2024	Department of Social Cohesion (DCS)
Antonio Hodgers	The Greens	Councillor of State President from June 1, 2023 to May 31, 2024	Department of Territory (DT)
Anne Hiltpold	PLR	Councillor of State	Department of Public Instruction, Training and Youth (DIP)
Carole-Anne Kast	PS	Councillor of State	Department of Institutions and Digital Affairs (DIN)
Pierre Maudet	LJS	Councillor of State	Department of Health and Mobility (DSM)
Delphine Bachmann	The Centre	Councillor of State	Department of Economy and Employment (DEE)
Michèle Righetti-El Zayadi	Independent	State Chancellor	State Chancellery (CHA)

The Council of State is assisted by a chancellor. Michèle Righetti has held this position since May 14, 2018. Her predecessor, Anja Wyden Guelpa

(PSS), was chancellor from 2009 to 2018.

The seven departments and the chancellery make up the Geneva cantonal administration. As of December 31, 2005, the administration had 15,729 employees for a total of 13,522.18 positions.

==== Elections ====
28 March 2021

Results of the second round of the by-election for the Council of State on March 28, 2021
Candidate name	Votes	Party	Status
Fabienne Fischer	47,507	The Greens	Elected
Pierre Maudet	38,184	Independent	Not elected
Delphine Bachmann	15,408	PDC	Not elected
Yves Nidegger	12,485	UDC	Not elected
Turnout	42.74%		

7 March 2021

In October 2020, following numerous twists and turns in the Maudet affair, the Council of State further exacerbated the situation that the canton has been experiencing since the affair began in May 2018. It temporarily dismissed Pierre Maudet from his Department of Economic Development (DDE) and delegated his duties to his colleague, Finance Minister Nathalie Fontanet. This decision was taken on the basis of an initial damning internal report on the State Councilor's working methods with his colleagues. He resigned a few days later and announced that he would be running for re-election.

Results of the first round of the by-election for the Council of State on March 7, 2021
Candidate name	Votes	Party	Status
Fabienne Fischer	38,626	The Greens	Not elected
Pierre Maudet	29,275	Independent	Not elected
Cyril Aellen	20,129	PLR	Not elected
Yves Nidegger	17,045	UDC	Not elected
Michel Matter	12,322	PVL	Not elected
Morten Gisselbaek	6,407	PdT	Not elected
Olivier Pahud	1,562	Évolution suisse	Not elected
Yann Testa	777	PBD	Not elected
Absolute majority	64,734		
Turnout	48.15%		

15 April and 6 May 2018
In the 2018 elections, 31 candidates competed for the top seven seats on the State Council. With the exception of François Longchamp (PLR), all the other incumbents stood for re-election. On April 15, Pierre Maudet obtained more than 50,000 votes, securing his re-election in the first round. During the second round, all the outgoing candidates were re-elected, except for Luc Barthassat (PDC), who lost his seat to the socialist Thierry Apothéloz, who beat him by more than 10,000 votes and, at the same time, entered the government. Nathalie Fontanet of the PLR succeeded the PLR magistrate François Longchamp.

=== The Judiciary ===
The canton – sovereign insofar as its sovereignty is not limited by the Federal Constitution (Art. 3 FC) – is responsible for enforcing certain federal and cantonal laws within its territory. For this purpose, it has courts in all areas of law (civil law, criminal law, administrative law).

The canton of Geneva is unique in that it forms a single judicial district. This means that there is only one court of first instance for civil matters (the Civil Court) and one court of first instance for criminal matters (the Criminal Court) for the entire canton. The court of second instance is the Court of Justice, which consists of a civil court, a criminal court, and an administrative court. The Court of Justice is therefore the equivalent of what most cantons call the “Cantonal Court” (Kantonsgericht).

Therefore, in Geneva, judicial power is exercised by:

- the Public Prosecutor's Office,
- the Civil Court, including the Court of First Instance, the Rent Tribunal, and the Rent Conciliation Commission,
- the Criminal Court, comprising the Compulsory Measures Court, the Police Court, the Correctional Court, the Criminal Court, and the Court of Enforcement of Sentences and Measures,
- the Guardianship Court and Justice of the Peace,
- the Labor Court,
- the Juvenile Court,
- the Administrative Court of First Instance,
- the Court of Justice, comprising the Civil Court, i.e., the Civil Chamber, the Rent Tribunal, the Labor Chamber, and the Supervisory Chamber; the Criminal Court, i.e., the Criminal Appeals Chamber and the Criminal Appeals and Review Chamber; the Public Law Court, comprising the Administrative Chamber and the Social Insurance Chamber,
- the Court of Appeal of the Judiciary.

Under the conditions defined by the Federal Act on the Federal Supreme Court, judgments and rulings of the Geneva courts may be brought before the Federal Supreme Court.

Magistrates, who are very often tacitly elected via the Inter-Party Commission, are subject to supervision by the High Council of the Judiciary during their term of office. A list of Geneva magistrates (by jurisdiction, seniority, and political affiliation) can be found on the institution's website.

The judiciary is governed by a body called the Management Committee. This committee is composed of the Attorney General, who chairs it, a judge from a civil court or tribunal, a judge from a criminal court or tribunal, a judge from an administrative court or tribunal, and a member of the judiciary staff. In addition, the Secretary General attends the meetings of the Management Commission in an advisory capacity. The members of the Management Commission are elected for a term of three years and may be re-elected once.

==== Attorney General ====
In Geneva, the Attorney General is considered – honorarily – to be the chief magistrate of the Republic, even though protocol regulations place him third in line. In fact, the office of this magistrate is very old, dating back to 1534.

The Attorney General is elected by the electorate using the majority system for a 6-year term. He organizes and directs the Public Prosecutor's Office, chairs the Judicial Power Management Committee, and exercises other civil and administrative powers conferred by law. This position is currently held by Olivier Jornot, who was elected by the Grand Council of Geneva on December 1, 2011 to complete the term of Daniel Zappelli, who resigned. On April 13, 2014, Olivier Jornot was re-elected for a new 6-year term. On February 3, 2020, he was tacitly re-elected for a third 6-year term.

=== Court of Auditors ===
On 27 November 2005, Genevan voters approved the creation of a Court of Auditors based on the French model, with 85.9% of votes.

This new entity is elected by the electorate for a 6-year term, in a single college and by majority vote. The Genevan Court of Auditors has three magistrates and three deputies. As an external, independent, and autonomous body, it is responsible for auditing the cantonal administration, cantonal public law institutions, and various subsidized organizations. The audits it carries out are at its discretion and are the subject of public reports, which may include recommendations, which are communicated to the State Council, the Grand Council and the audited entity. This institution is the first of its kind in Switzerland. Its magistrates were elected for the first time on 24 September 2006:

- Magistrates:
  - Stanislas Zuin
  - Antoinette Stalder – Resigned, replaced by Daniel Devaud in a by-election on September 18, 2011.
  - Stéphane Geiger
- Alternates:
  - Michel Ducommun
  - Marco Ziegler
  - Myriam Nicolazzi

Two magistrates, Daniel Devaud and Stéphane Geiger, did not run again in the election of 4 November 2012. Voter turnout was 27.80%.

- Magistrates:
  - François Paychère
  - Isabelle Terrier
  - Stanislas Zuin (2nd term)
- Alternates:
  - Hans Isler
  - Myriam Nicolazzi (2nd term)
  - Marco Ziegler (2nd term)

As the only list submitted, the latter, composed of a ticket (PLR-PS-PDC-GREENS), was tacitly elected and the election scheduled for 23 September 2018 was canceled. Isabelle Terrier and François Paychère ran again as magistrates while the outgoing Myriam Nicolazzi was again a candidate for the position of deputy magistrate.

- Magistrates:
  - Isabelle Terrier (2nd term)
  - François Paychère (2nd term)
  - Sophie Forster Carbonnier
- Alternates:
  - Frédéric Varone
  - Dominik Spiess
  - Myriam Nicolazzi (3rd term)

== Political parties ==
=== Parties represented in the Grand Council ===
Here is the list of parliamentary parties, ranked from right to left, that will be present for the 2023–2028 legislative term:

- Democratic Union of the Center: Although it arrived late on the Geneva political scene (1988) compared to its establishment in other Swiss cantons (from 1971 ), the party nevertheless quickly found its place on the right of the political spectrum. In the 2023 elections, the party won 10.69% of the vote, giving it 12 seats.
- The Liberals (PLR): The party was formed in 2011 from the merger of the Liberal Party of Switzerland and the Free Democratic Party, following their union at the national level in 2009. In 2009, the two parties formed the canton's leading force with 31 deputies, but they lost seven seats in the 2013 elections. In 2023, the party lost 6.16% of the vote but remained the leading political force in the canton, winning 22 seats in parliament and retaining two magistrates in the government: Nathalie Fontanet and Anne Hiltpold.
- Geneva Citizens' Movement (MCG): Founded in 2005, its populist rhetoric and ideas of “priority for Geneva residents,” often directed against cross-border workers, enabled the MCG to quickly find an audience in Geneva, becoming the canton's second largest party in the 2009 cantonal elections and again in 2013. In the 2023 elections, the party won three seats in parliament (14 seats compared to 11 in 2018). The party became the fourth largest force in the canton.
- The Center: The party advocating moderate policies was formed in January 2022 through the merger of the Christian Democratic Party and the Bourgeois Democratic Party. It saw its number of elected representatives fall in 2023 from 12 seats to 9. However, it still managed to achieve a quorum with a score of 7.88%, positioning itself as the canton's last political force. It still managed to win a seat on the State Council with the election of Delphine Bachmann.
- Libertés et justice sociale (LJS): Pierre Maudet's party, which split from the Geneva PLR in November 2021, entered the political arena in the 2023 elections. It scored 8.45% and won 10 seats, placing it as the second-to-last force in the canton. As this new party is not structured, it is difficult to place it on the political spectrum. Nevertheless, LJS remains a centrist party. It succeeded in getting its illustrious founder, Pierre Maudet, elected to the State Council.
- Green Party: Founded in 1983, the Greens saw a steady increase in the number of their elected representatives at the cantonal level in the 2000s. However, in the 2023 elections, the number of elected representatives stagnated, obtaining 15 seats and thus becoming the third largest force in the canton.
- Social Democratic Party: Positioned between social democracy and the radical left, it is the second political force in the canton. During the last elections, it managed to gain an additional seat (18 in total) despite losing 0.65% of the vote. The party succeeded in getting two representatives elected to the government in the persons of Thierry Apothéloz and Carole-Anne Kast.

=== Other parties ===
- Green Liberal: Geneva branch of the Swiss Green Liberal Party, founded in 2010. Still young, the party has not yet found its electorate, having benefited little from the party's breakthrough at the federal level. However, it has around ten municipal councilors in suburban communities. In 2013, with 3.16% of the vote, it failed to reach the quorum in the Grand Council election.
- Pirate Party: Geneva branch of the Swiss Pirate Party, founded in early 2011. The party, which is difficult to place on the political spectrum, has not yet managed to get a candidate elected in the canton. It received 1.61% of the vote in the 2013 elections. Branch inactive since 2016.
- Evangelical People's Party: Geneva branch of the Swiss Evangelical Party, founded in 2007. Although officially still active, the party has not taken part in an election in the canton for several years and has very little visibility. Branch inactive since 2021.
- Defense of Seniors, Tenants, Employment, and Social Issues: founded in 2009. Radical left-wing party.
- Labor Party: founded in 1943 (initially under the name Workers' Party), from the Communist Party banned by the Federal Council in 1940. This radical left-wing party, formerly Stalinist, is Marxist-Leninist in orientation.
- SolidarityS: founded in 1992. Radical anti-capitalist left-wing party.
- The People's Union: founded in 2023. Radical left-wing party, split from Solidarity.
- Revolutionary Communist Party: founded in 2024, Trotskyist.

=== Former parties ===
Ranked by most recent date of disappearance.

- Christian Democratic People's Party (PDC): Geneva branch of the Swiss PDC. Founded in 1892 under the name Independent Party. Historically a right-wing Catholic party. This party merged with the Bourgeois Democratic Party to form The Center in January 2022.
- Conservative Democratic Party (PBD): Geneva branch of the Swiss Bourgeois Democratic Party. Founded in 2013, the Geneva branch of the PBD took part in the 2013 cantonal elections, winning 0.56% of the vote. Its positioning in an already crowded center-right niche made its chances of success uncertain. This party merged with the Christian Democratic Party to form The Center in January 2022.
- Geneva People's Party: After more than twelve years in politics, former MP Pascal Spuhler founded the Geneva People's Party with MCG splinter groups supporting Éric Stauffer, who had come together under the banner of Genève en marche. This new party was formed on May 1, 2018, and fights to defend the “middle class,” which is more broadly recognized by the term “working class ." Its main objectives are to fight against incivility and defend the middle class, private sector workers, small business owners, retired tenants, young people in training, and all Genevans and residents who are struggling to make ends meet. The party disappeared in 2020.
- Genève en marche: founded in 2017 by Éric Stauffer and dissolved in 2018.
- Libertarian Party: founded in Geneva in 2014, it brings together classical liberals, minarchists, and anarcho-capitalists. It disappeared in 2016.
- Liberal Party: founded in Geneva in 1875 under the name Democratic Party. It disappeared when it merged with the Radical Party in 2011.
- Free Democratic Party: founded in Geneva in 1842. A revolutionary party that challenged the old order when it was founded. Over time, it gradually became a center-right party. It disappeared when it merged with the Radical Party in 2011.
- Freedom Party: the Geneva branch was founded in 1989. Anti-environmentalist party. Disappeared in the 1990s.
- National Action Against Foreign Overpopulation: the Geneva branch was active from the 1970s, but subsequently ceased to exist.
- Marxist Revolutionary League / Socialist Workers' Party: founded in 1969, dissolved in 1991.
- Vigilance: founded in 1965 in Geneva. Nationalist party. It disappeared in 1991.
- Civic Awakening: critical split from the Democratic Party (predecessor of the Liberals Party) over immigration. Party active in the second half of the 1950s.
- Progressive Party: founded by Léon Nicole after his break with the Labor Party. Active during the 1950s.
- Alliance of Independents: active in Geneva in the 1940s.
- National Union: founded in Geneva in 1932. Nationalist, frontist, and corporatist party. It disappeared in 1945.
- Communist Party: the Geneva section was founded in 1921. The party was banned by the Federal Council in 1944.
- Economic Defense Union: founded in Geneva in 1923. Anti-statist party. It merged in 1932 with the National Political Order to form the National Union.

== Civic rights ==
Citizens are eligible to vote and stand for election provided they are Swiss nationals and reside in the canton of Geneva. Foreigners who have been resident in Switzerland for at least eight years (including three months in the canton) were granted the right to vote at municipal level on April 24, 2005, following the submission of a double popular initiative. On the other hand, the initiative granting the right to stand for election was rejected. In this way, Geneva is following the example of most of the French-speaking cantons, which are more liberal than the German-speaking cantons when it comes to allowing foreigners to participate in local politics.

The citizens of the canton of Geneva have the right of referendum and the right of popular initiative. These rights also exist at the federal level. For all laws concerning a new tax or the modification of an existing tax, a facilitated referendum is provided for. Laws amending the constitution are subject to a mandatory referendum. The right of referendum also allows a law passed by the Grand Council to be submitted to the electorate. This requires the signatures of at least 2% of those eligible to vote within 40 days of the publication of a law. If the signatures are collected, the electorate must be called to the polls for a vote. The right of initiative allows any citizen of the canton to propose a new law or the amendment of an existing law. It is necessary to collect signatures from at least 2% of those eligible to vote for the proposal to be put to a popular vote. For partial or total amendments to the constitution, 4% of those eligible to vote must submit the proposal. Parliaments may decide to support the initiative or oppose it with a counter-proposal. If this happens, the original proposal is put to a vote alongside the counter-proposal. The electorate then votes on one or the other text.

Civil rights for citizens of Geneva and confederates (i.e., people from other cantons who are established in Geneva and have cantonal citizenship) are as follows:

- Optional referendum: laws passed by the Grand Council may be subject to a referendum if 2% of those eligible to vote request it within 40 days of the law's publication.
- Facilitated referendum: laws passed by the Grand Council that introduce a new tax or change an existing tax, or amend legislation on housing, tenant protection, and dwellings, may be subject to a referendum if 500 political rights holders request it.
- Municipal referendum: The conditions vary according to the size of the municipality, from 30% of the electorate for municipalities with fewer than 500 inhabitants to 4,000 voters in the City of Geneva.
- Cantonal legislative initiative: 2% of those eligible to vote can submit a proposal, with or without wording, to the Grand Council. If it is rejected, it is put to a cantonal vote.
- Cantonal constitutional initiative: 4% of those eligible to vote can submit a proposal for a total or partial revision of the constitution.
- Municipal initiative: The conditions vary according to the size of the municipality, from 30% of the electorate for municipalities with fewer than 500 inhabitants to 4,000 voters in the City of Geneva.

== Federal representatives ==
=== Federal Council ===
Over the course of its history, Geneva has sent five federal councilors to Bern: Jean-Jacques Challet-Venel, Adrien Lachenal, Gustave Ador, Ruth Dreifuss, and Micheline Calmy-Rey (originally from Valais).

=== Federal Assembly (parliament) ===
Following the federal elections on October 20, 2019, the canton is represented in the National Council for the 2019–2023 legislative period by:

- Laurence Fehlmann Rielle and Christian Dandrès (PSS)
- Nicolas Walder, Delphine Klopfenstein Broggini, and Isabelle Pasquier (Green Party)
- Michel Matter (PVL)
- Christian Lüscher and Simone de Montmollin (PLR)
- Céline Amaudruz and Yves Nidegger (UDC)
- Vincent Maitre (PDC)
- Stéfanie Prezioso (EàG)

Similarly, following the federal elections on October 20, 2019, the canton is represented in the Council of States for the 2019-2023 legislative term by:

- Lisa Mazzone (Green Party)
- Carlo Sommaruga (PSS)

== Municipal level ==
Genevan citizens have the right to referendum and popular initiative.

For more information on the politics of a Genevan municipality, select it from the list of municipalities of the canton of Geneva.

== Bibliography ==
- Mario Togni (2020-12-31). Institutions politiques genevoises [Geneva’s political institutions]. Comprendre (in French). Chavannes-près-Renens: Éditions Loisirs et Pédagogie. p. 104. ISBN 978-2-606-01848-1.
