= 2023 Geneva cantonal election =

2023 Geneva cantonal elections
- 2 April 2023 (first round); 30 April 2023 (second round)
- Registered: 275,893 (first round); 276,170 (second round)
- Council of State

All 7 seats in the Council of State of Geneva
- Turnout: 37.02% (▼1.75pp) (first round); 42.05% (▲7.05pp) (second round)
	First party	Second party	Third party
Party	Liberal Radicals	Social Democrats	Greens
Elected	Nathalie Fontanet; 70,628, 61.51%	Thierry Apothéloz; 57,369, 49.96%	Antonio Hodgers; 52,950, 46.11%
	Anne Hiltpold; 58,487, 50.93%	Carole-Anne Kast; 47,956, 41.76%
	Fourth party	Fifth party
Party	The Centre	LJS
Elected	Delphine Bachmann; 51,379, 44.74%	Pierre Maudet; 48,345, 42.10%
- Grand Council
- All 100 seats in the Grand Council of Geneva; 51 seats needed for a majority
- Turnout: 37.14% (▼1.63pp)
Party	Vote %	Seats	+/–
Liberal Radicals	19.02	22	−6
Socialist	14.65	18	+1
Greens	12.93	15	0
Geneva Citizens'	11.72	14	+3
Democratic Centre	10.69	12	+4
LJS	8.45	10	New
The Centre	7.88	9	−3
This lists parties that won seats. See the complete results below.
Leading party by electoral arrondissement
PLR PS PES MCG LJS LC

Cantonal elections were held in Geneva on 3 April 2023, with a second round on 30 April, to elect all 100 members of the legislative Grand Council and 7 members of the executive Council of State of the canton.

== Election system ==
=== Grand Council ===
The Grand Council holds the legislative power in the Canton of Geneva. It is composed of 100 deputies directly elected via universal suffrage by the electorate using a canton-wide open-list proportional representation system and a 7% threshold. Members are elected for five years instead of four after a reform of the canton's constitution in 2013.

=== Council of State ===
The Council of State holds the executive power in the Canton of Geneva. It is composed of 7 members directly elected via universal suffrage by the electorate using a two-round majoritarian system, with candidates requiring an absolute majority in the first round to be elected. Members are elected for five years instead of four after a reform of the canton's constitution in 2013.

This constitutional reform also led to members not being elected on a list of candidates, but on a single ballot with check boxes. This system reduces the impact of alliances and encourages voters to vote for seven candidates instead of the only candidates who would be on their preferred list.

== Contesting parties ==
The table below lists contesting parties represented in the Grand Council after the 2018 election.

Name		Ideology	2018 result	
Name		Ideology	Votes (%)	Seats
PLR	The Liberal-Radicals; Les Libéraux-Radicaux	Classical liberalism Conservative liberalism	25.2%	28 / 100
PS	Socialist Party; Parti socialiste	Social democracy Democratic socialism	15.3%	17 / 100
PES	The Greens; Les Vert-e-s	Green politics Progressivism	13.2%	15 / 100
LC	The Centre (Note: Merger of the Christian Democratic Party and of the Conservative Democratic Party.); Le Centre	Christian democracy Social conservatism	11.2%	12 / 100
MCG	Geneva Citizens' Movement; Mouvement Citoyens Genevois	Right-wing populism Regionalism	9.4%	11 / 100
EàG	Together on the Left Ensemble à Gauche: Solidarity solidaritéS; Swiss Party of Labour – Workers' and People's Party Parti Suisse du Travail – Parti Ouvrier et Populaire; Defence of Seniors, Tenants, Housing and Social Défense des aînés, des locataires, du logement et du social	Anticapitalism; Eco-socialism	7.8%	9 / 100
UDC	Democratic Union of the Centre; Union démocratique du centre	National conservatism Right-wing populism	7.3%	8 / 100

== Results ==
=== Grand Council ===
Party	Votes	%	Seats	+/–
The Liberal-Radicals	17,281	18.04	22	-6
Socialist Party	13,257	13.84	18	+1
The Greens	11,798	12.32	15	0
Geneva Citizens' Movement	10,603	11.07	14	+3
Democratic Union of the Centre	9,677	10.10	12	+4
Freedom and Social Justice	7,823	8.17	10	New
The Centre	7,057	7.37	9	−3
Green Liberal Party	6,017	6.28	0	0
Together on the Left	3,200	3.34	0	−9
List of Popular Unity	2,680	2.80	0	0
Civis - All concerned	976	1.02	0	0
Radical Momentum	256	0.27	0	0
Individual candidates votes	5,154	5.38	–	–
**Total**	**95,779**	**100.00**	**100**	–
Valid votes	95,779	96.03		
Invalid votes	2,954	2.96		
Blank votes	1,009	1.01		
Total votes	**99,742**	**100.00**		
Registered voters/turnout	275,893	36.15		
Source: Canton of Geneva

=== Council of State ===
Blank votes are only considered as valid in the first round to determine if a candidate has crossed the majority threshold.
Elected candidates are highlighted in bold font.

Candidate	Party	First round		Second round	
Candidate	Party	Votes	%	Votes	%
**Nathalie Fontanet**	The Liberal-Radicals	49,218	49.27	70,628	61.51
**Thierry Apothéloz**	Socialist Party	38,232	38.27	57,369	49.96
**Antonio Hodgers**	The Greens	35,490	35.53	52,950	46.11
**Anne Hiltpold**	The Liberal-Radicals	35,147	35.18	58,487	50.93
Fabienne Fischer	The Greens	31,403	31.44	47,104	41.02
**Pierre Maudet**	Freedom and Social Justice	31,315	31.35	48,345	42.10
**Carole-Anne Kast**	Socialist Party	31,289	31.32	47,956	41.76
Philippe Morel	Geneva Citizens' Movement	29,575	29.61	42,006	36.58
**Delphine Bachmann**	The Centre	27,566	27.60	51,379	44.74
Xavier Magnin	The Centre	23,656	23.68		
Lionel Dugerdil	Democratic Union of the Centre	23,263	23.29	39,281	34.21
Michael Andersen	Democratic Union of the Centre	20,904	20.93		
Marie-Claude Sawerschel	Green Liberal Party	17,493	17.51		
Marc Wuarin	Green Liberal Party	16,663	16.68		
Luc Barthassat	Civis - All concerned	14,732	14.75		
Françoise Nyffeler Batou	Together on the Left	12,651	12.66		
Stéfanie Prezioso Batou	List of Popular Unity	11,350	11.36		
Jean Burgermeister	List of Popular Unity	11,187	11.20		
Teo Frei	Together on the Left	9,507	9.52		
Alexander Eniline	Together on the Left	7,699	7.71		
Roland-Daniel Schneebeli	Radical Momentum	4,943	4.95		
Philippe Oberson	Popular Resistance	4,348	4.35	12,988	11.31
Olivier Pahud	Swiss Evolution	3,338	3.34	11,202	9.76
**Total**		**490,969**	**100.00**	**539,695**	**100.00**
Valid votes		99,983	97.90	114,832	98.89
Invalid votes		852	0.83	291	0.25
Blank votes		1,292	1.27	996	0.86
Total votes		**102,127**	**100.00**	**116,119**	**100.00**
Registered voters/turnout		275,893	37.02	276,170	42.05
Source: Canton of Geneva (first round, second round)
