= Yves Nidegger =

Swiss politician (born 1957)

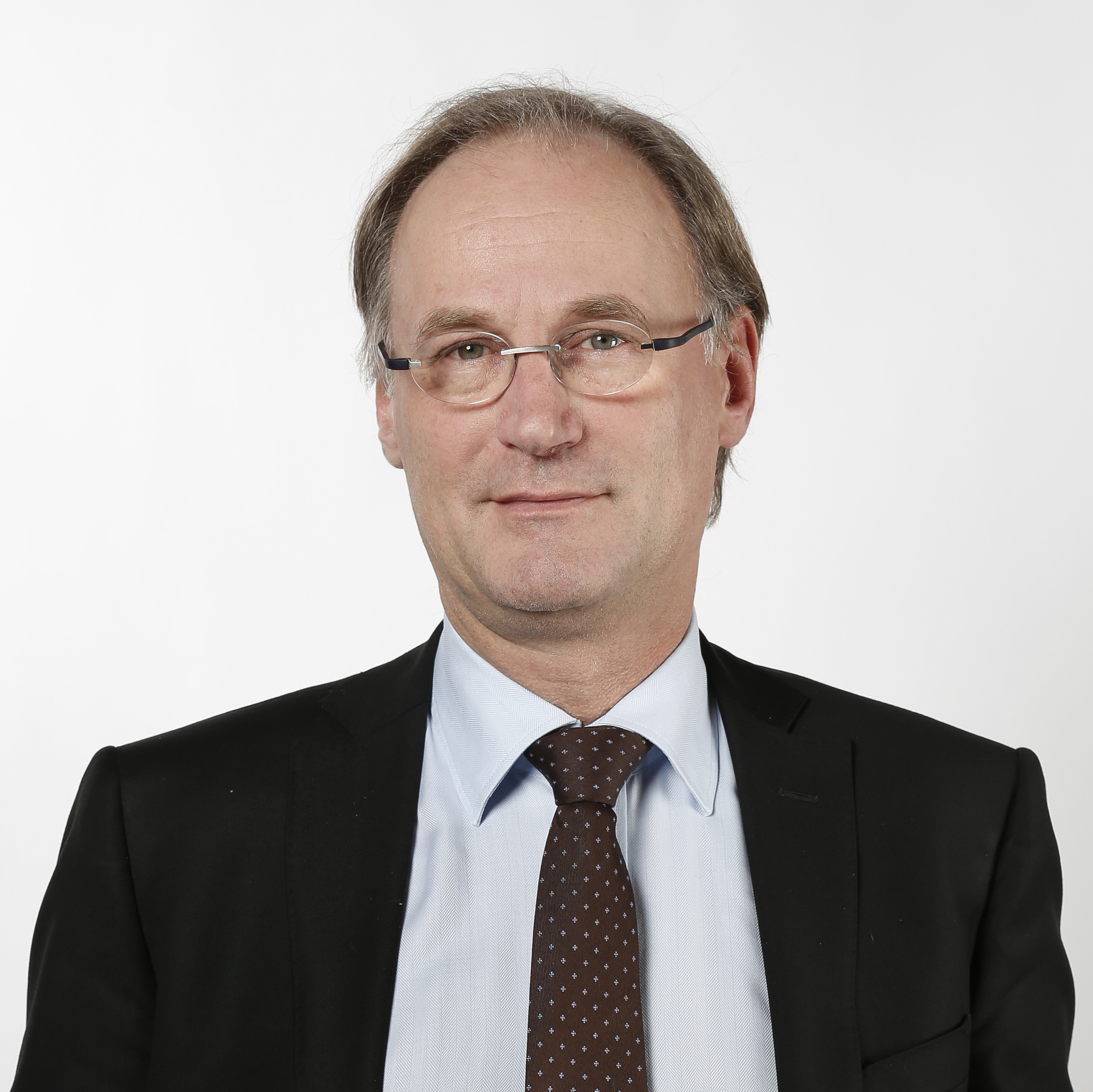
- Yves Nidegger (2015)

Member of the National Council (Switzerland)
- In office 3 December 2007 – 11 May 2023
- Succeeded by: Thomas Bläsi
- Constituency: Canton of Geneva

Personal details
- Born: Yves Robert Nidegger; May 7, 1957 (age 69) Zürich, Zürich, Switzerland
- Party: Swiss People's Party
- Education: University of Geneva (Licentiate)
- Profession: Attorney, politician
- Website: nideggerlaw.ch (in French)

Military service
- Branch/service: Swiss Armed Forces
- Rank: Soldier

Yves Robert Nidegger (/nɪdɛkɛr/; born 17 May 1957) is a Swiss attorney and politician who formerly served as a member of the National Council (Switzerland) for the Swiss People's Party between 2007 and 2023 being succeeded by Thomas Bläsi. Previously, he was a member of the Grand Council of Geneva from 2005 to 2009, respectively congressional vice president of the Swiss People's Party Geneva from 2004 to 2006 and 2009 to 2010.

== Early life and education ==
Nidegger was born on 17 May 1957 in Zürich, Switzerland. His father was an official of the Federal government and his mother a French-born banking executive, originally from Paris. His family moved to Geneva in 1959 where he was raised. Nidegger holds dual-citizenship of Switzerland and France by the virtue of birth. He was raised in a Catholic family.

He attended schools in Geneva, most notably the École supérieur de commerce, where he completed his Maturité (History, English and History of Christianity). He then studied law at the University of Geneva, where he graduated with a Licentiate degree.

== Career ==
Initially, Nidegger engaged in journalism, during his studies. In the early 1980s, he became a stringer, for the New York Tribune as well as The Washington Times. He also worked in finance for the Unification Church, of which he was a member until 1994 and spokesperson in Geneva. According to his own statements, this membership was not about faith, but for admiration of the anti-communist movement. He later also wrote for Vigilance Genève.

Following his stint in journalism he worked eight years in the private sector, eight and a half months as lawyer for L'Association des commis de Genève (today part of Unia), led by Charles Beer, who'd later become a cantonal councilor. In 1992, he volunteered as a professor at the University of Tirana in Tirana, Albania. He was president of Tribunal prud'hommes in Geneva between 1993 and 2005. In 1998, Nidegger has been admitted to the Bar of Geneva. Currently, he is an independent attorney and partner in NideggerLaw Sàrl.

Nidegger is currently a member of the board of directors of Geneva International Airport, a director of SSR Genève (television and radio broadcast), member of Groupement suisse des conseils en gestion indépendants, member of Fondation communale pour le développement des emplois et du tissu économique en ville de Genève – Fondetec, Genève (economic development) and he is a member of the Bar Commission of Geneva.

== Politics ==
He served on the Grand Council of Geneva from 2005 to 2009. In the 2007 Swiss federal election, he was elected into National Council (Switzerland) for the Swiss People's Party and assumed office on 3 December 2007. In March 2021, he was a candidate for Council of State of Geneva, but lost election to Fabienne Fischer. He resigned from National Council (Switzerland) on 11 May 2023 and was subsequently succeeded by Thomas Bläsi.

== Personal life ==
Nidegger is married and has five children. His wife is originally from Brazil.

He resides in the Le Petit-Saconnex section of Geneva and has a secondary residence in Thoiry (Savoie), France.
