= Geneva official chestnut tree =

Monitored tree in Geneva, Switzerland

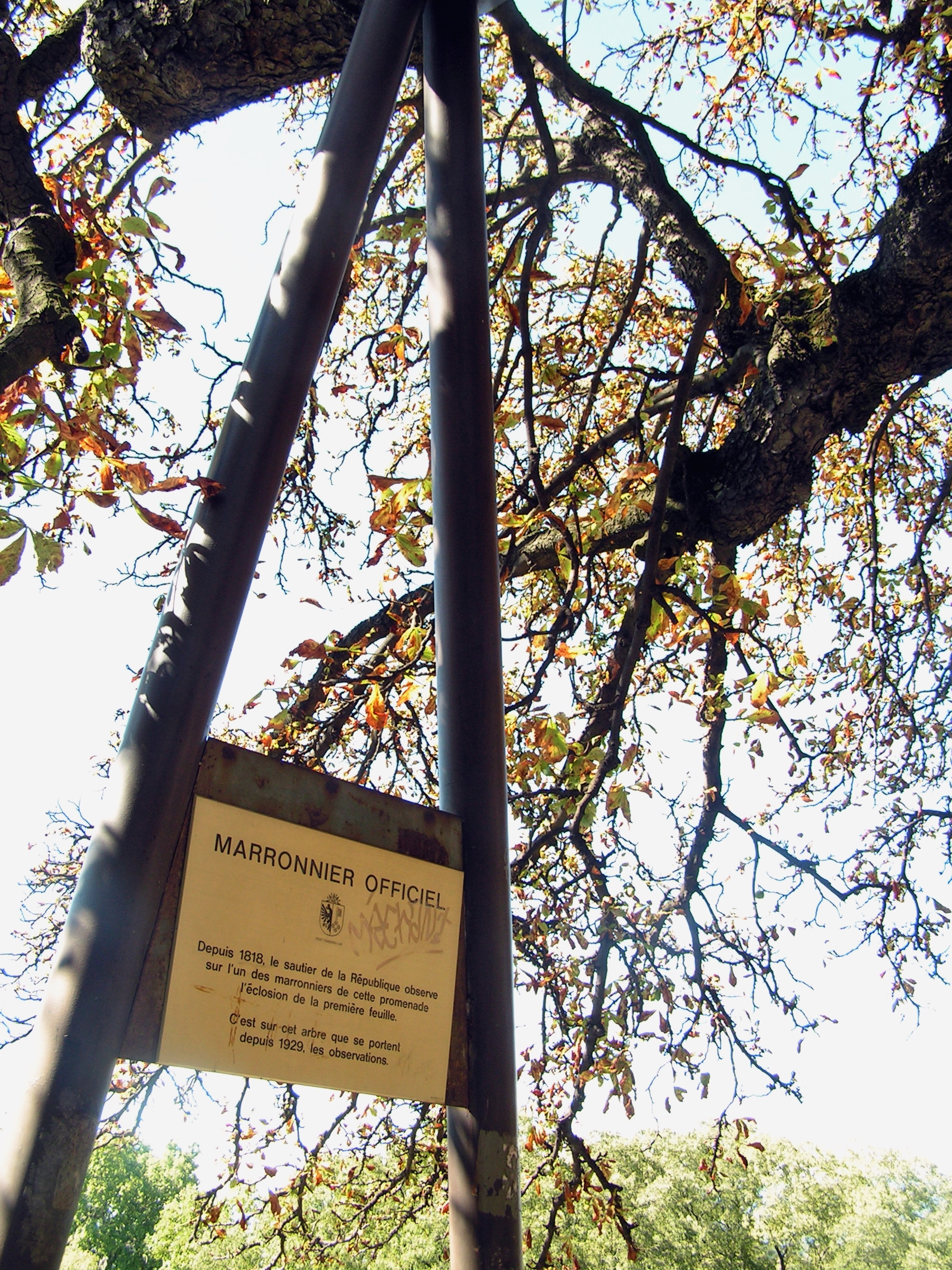
- The Geneva official chestnut tree in 2011

- Location within Canton of Geneva
- Species: Horse chestnut (Aesculus hippocastanum)
- Location: Geneva, Switzerland
- Coordinates: 46°12′02″N 06°08′47″E

The Geneva official chestnut tree is a horse chestnut tree planted in Geneva, Switzerland. Every year, the tree is observed by the secretary of the Grand Council of Geneva (the local parliament), and the opening of the first leaf is recorded and announced publicly as indicating the beginning of the spring.

The series of records started in 1818; it forms the oldest set of records of phenological events in Switzerland and is one of the living traditions in Switzerland. In 2023, the first leaf was observed on 3 March, slightly earlier than the observations made in recent years (in 2022, it was observed on 10 March)

== History ==
Between 1808 and 1831, Marc-Louis Rigaud regularly observed a chestnut tree located on the Promenade de la Treille in Geneva, and recorded the date of opening of the first bud on the tree. In 1818, an official tree was chosen, and the sautier (the secretary of the Grand Council of Geneva, the Parliament of the Canton of Geneva) is in charge of regularly observing the tree, and of recording the date of the opening on an official register. This event is then announced to the press and to the general public, indicating the beginning of the spring.

The tree chosen in 1818 died at the beginning of the 20th century, and a new tree was chosen in 1905. After its death in 1929, a third tree was chosen, which died due to a fungus infection shortly after the last record, on 13 March 2015. A fourth tree was chosen in September 2015, just across the Tour Baudet de l’Hôtel de Ville, the seat of government in Geneva since 1488.

== Climate ==
Dates of opening of the first bud of the official chestnut tree, between 1818 and 2026.

The dates of opening of the first bud of these chestnut trees, collected since 1808, form the oldest series of phenological records in Switzerland, and one of the oldest in the world. Researchers have thus been interested in it, as a witness to how a plant reacts to changing climatic conditions.

Despite the large year-to-year variability of the data, data show a trend during the 20th century towards an opening that happens earlier and earlier, with a record in "spring 2003," during which the opening took place on 29 December 2002. According to MeteoSwiss, the Swiss Federal Office of Meteorology and Climatology, global warming plays a role in this change, and so do other factors linked to the urban environment which increase the quantity of heat in the city. As of 2022, however, an inversion of this trend had been observed, with an opening occurring later over the previous few years. The reason for this inversion is not known, although it may be linked to the new tree that is used for the observations.

== Images ==
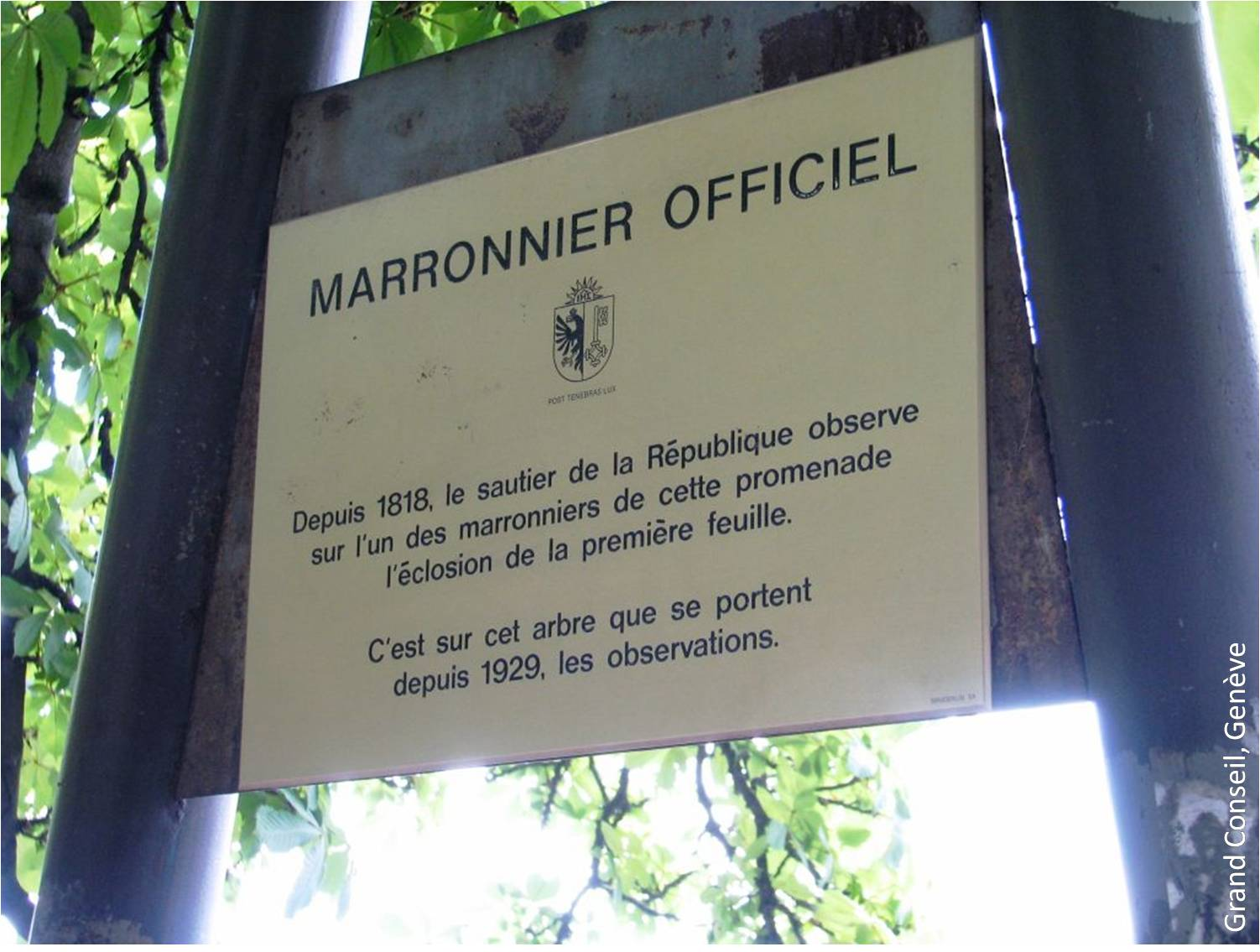
The plate indicating the third official tree in 2009

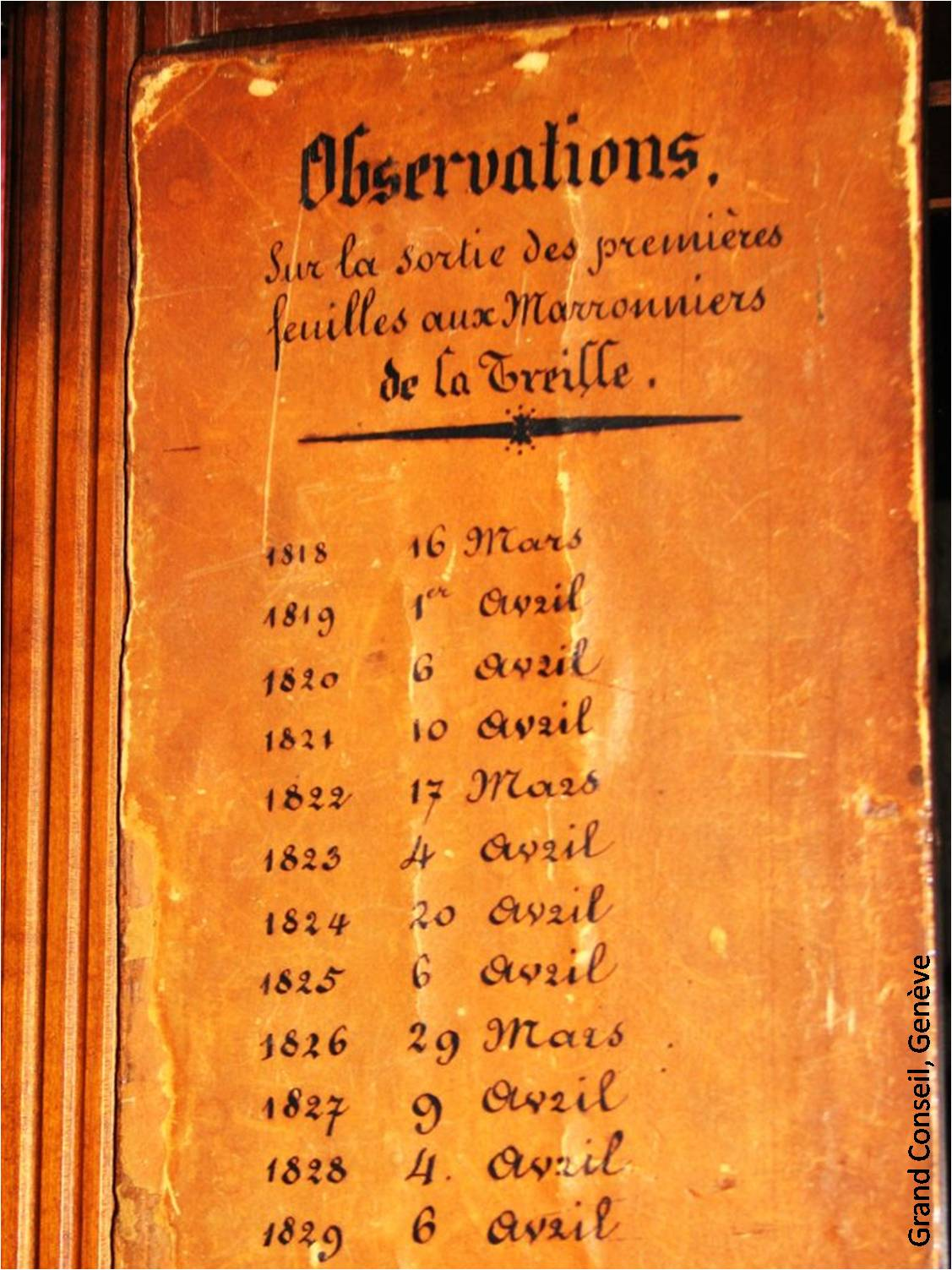
Register recording the opening of the first bud, between 1818 and 1829

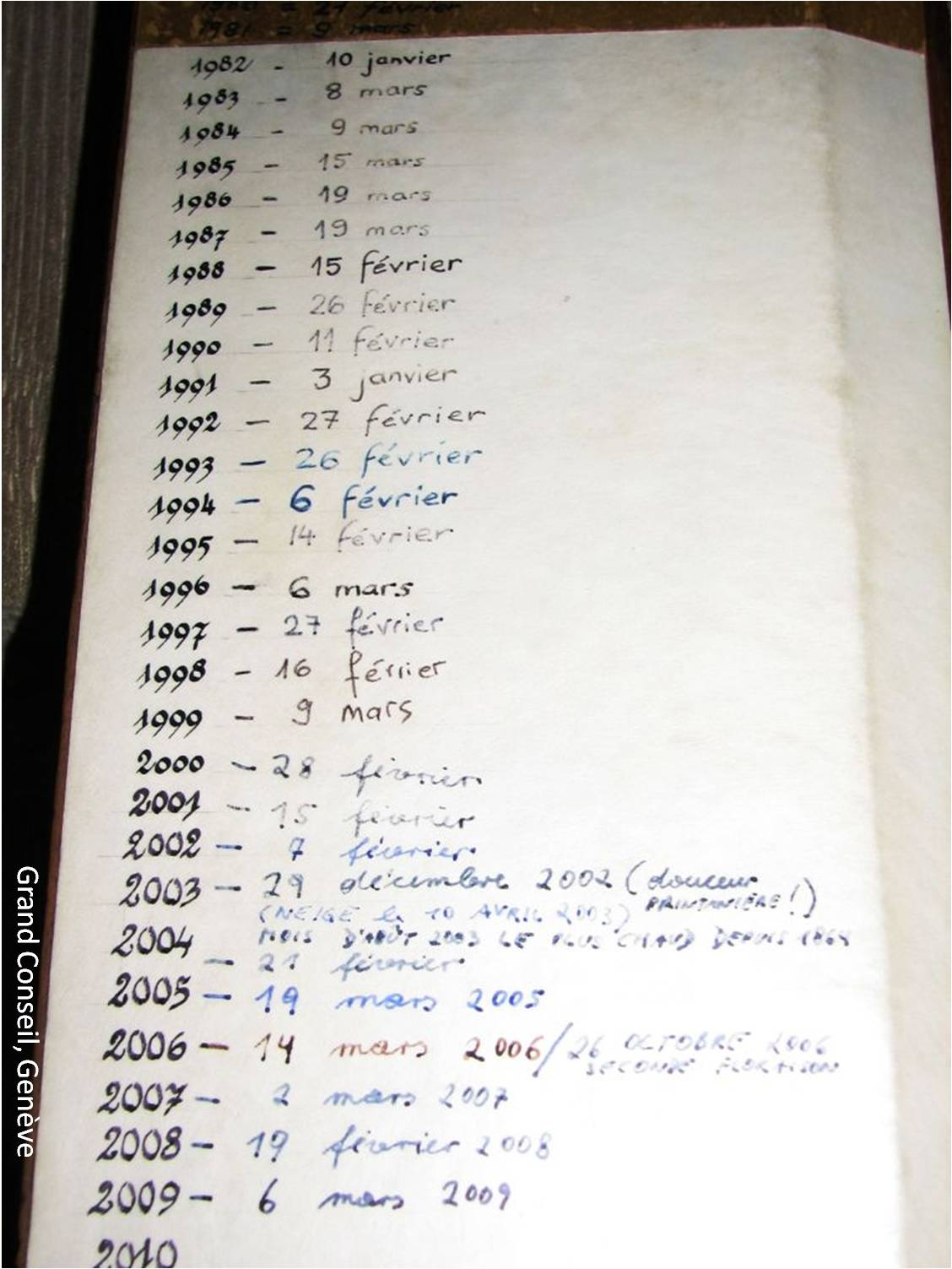
Register recording the opening of the first bud, between 1982 and 2009

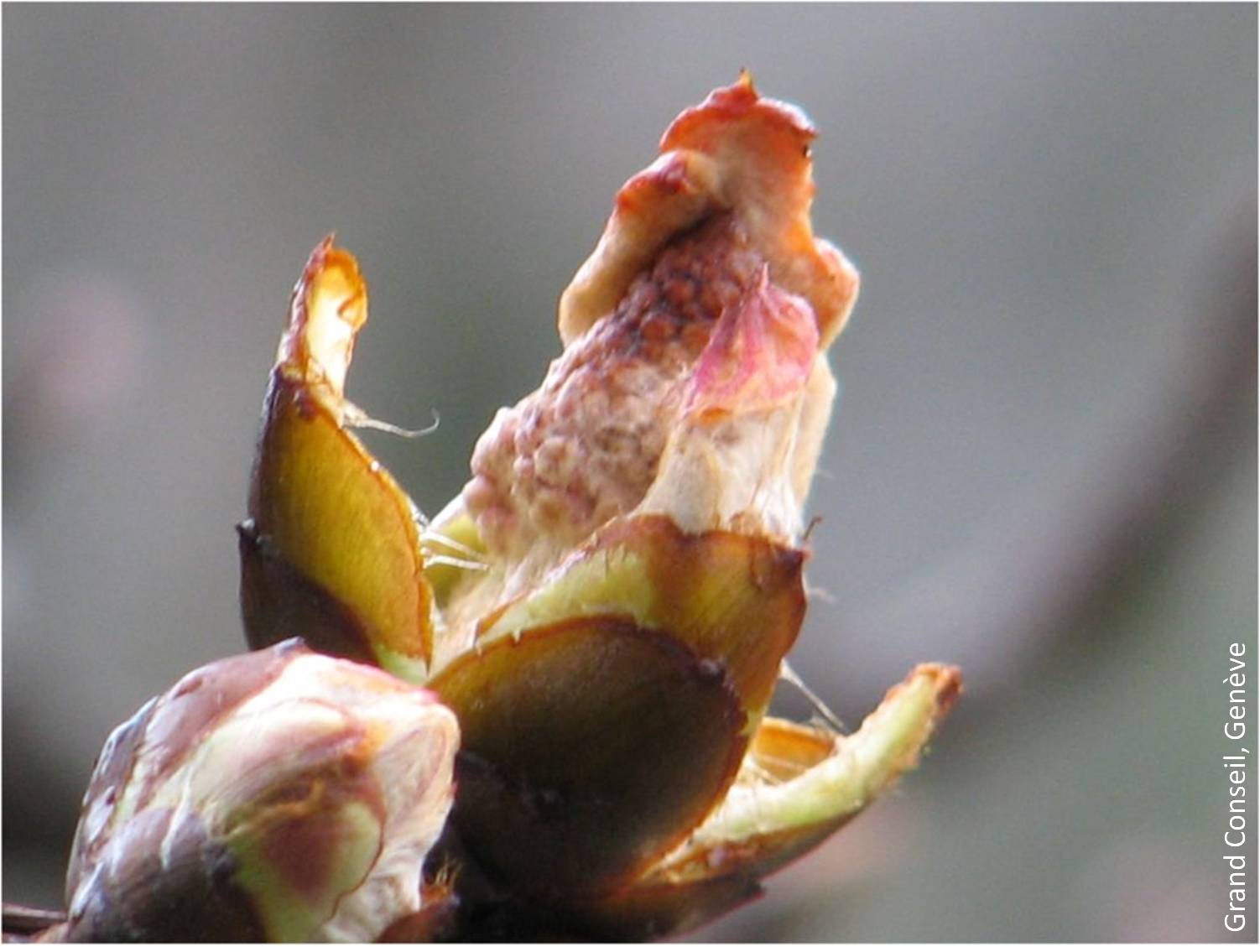
Opening of the first bud on 6 March 2009

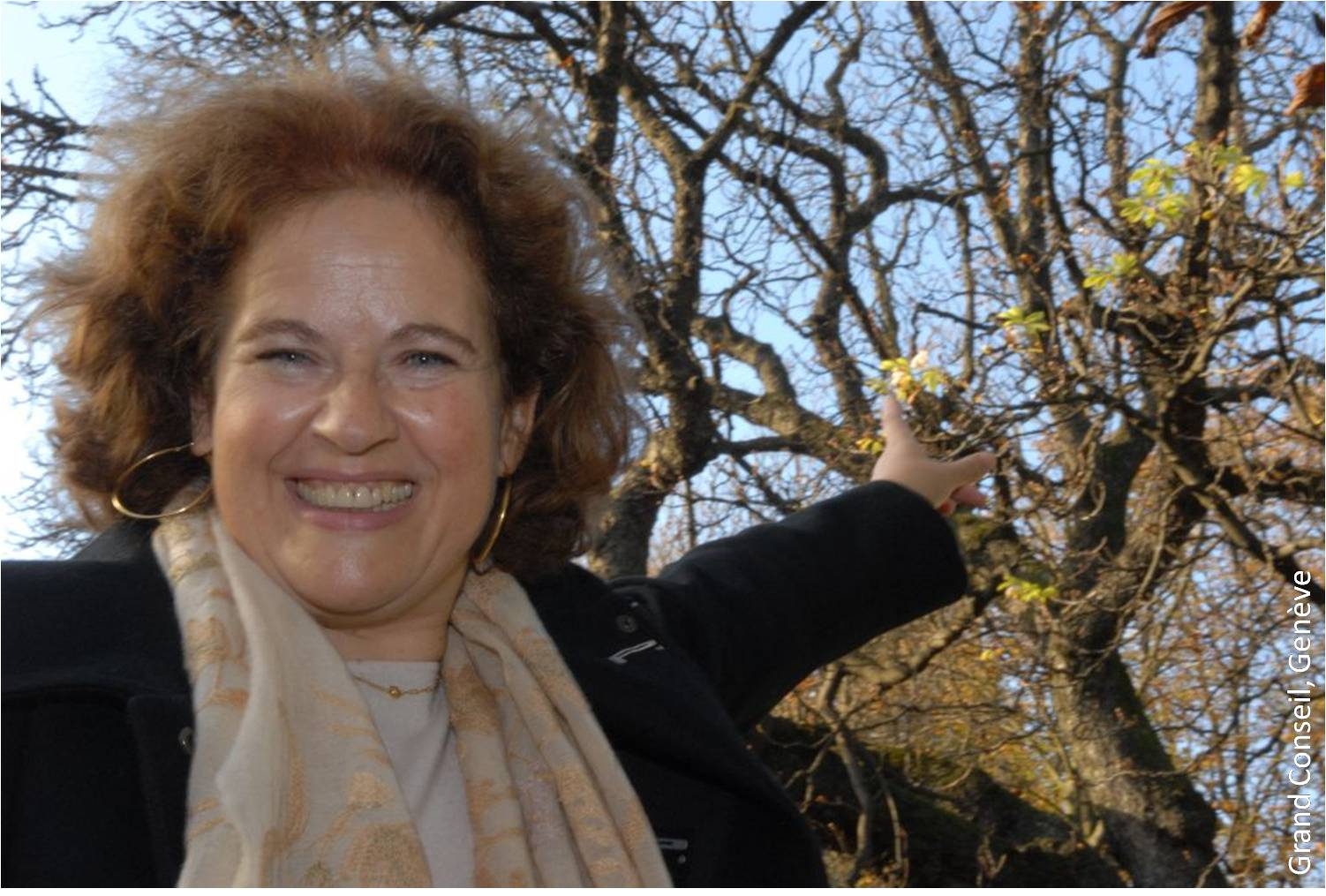
Maria Anna Hutter, the sautière, showing the official tree in 2009

== See also ==
- List of individual trees

== Sources ==
- Jacques Miège; Pierre Hainard (1967). "Un témoin genevois de l'évolution climatique récente". Archives des sciences. 20 (1). Société de physique et d'histoire naturelle de Genève: 109–121. doi:10.5169/seals-739384.
- Jacques Miège; Marie-Claude Wuest (1983). "Le marronnier de la Treille: Un indicateur de l'évolution du climat genevois depuis 175 ans". Archives des sciences. 36 (1). Société de physique et d'histoire naturelle de Genève: 147–161. doi:10.5169/seals-740211.
- Pierre Stoller; Roger Beer (1994). Service des espaces verts et de l’environnement (SEVE) (ed.). La première feuille du marronnier de la Treille. Geneva. OCLC 715717865.
