= Grand Genève =

Grand Genève Agglomération franco-valdo-genevoise
- Local Grouping of Transnational Cooperation (GLCT)
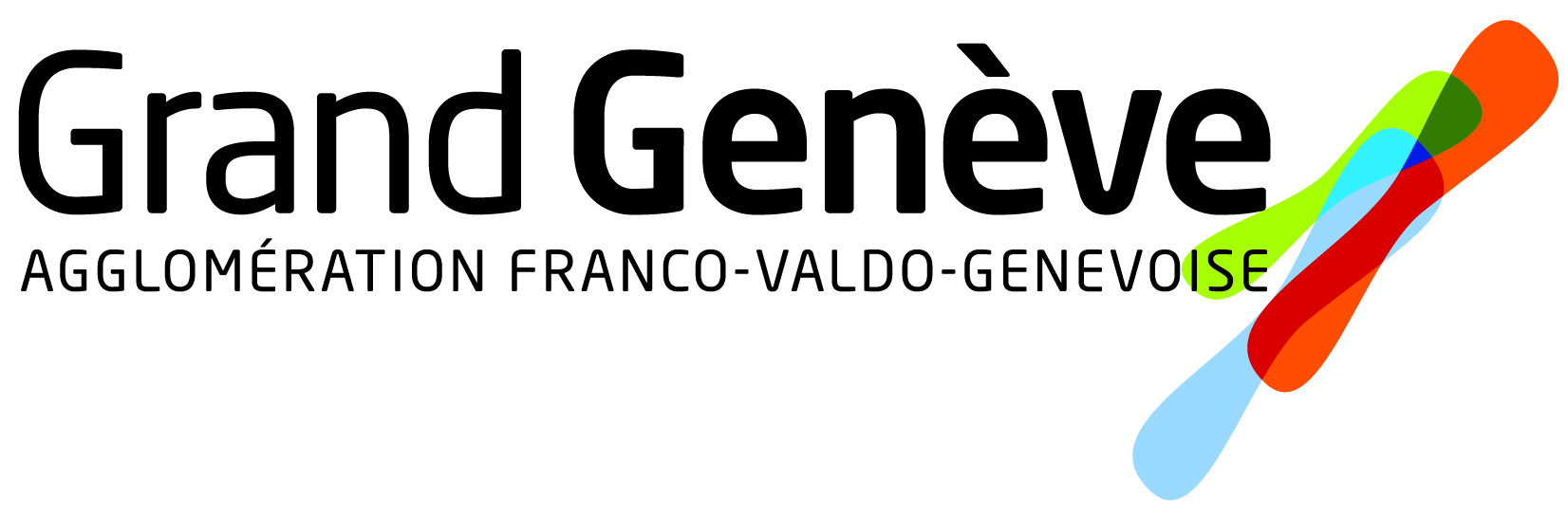

- Map of the Grand Genève GLCT, showing national and subnational boundaries. (Canton de Geneve and District de Nyon are in Switzerland, while the 8 other councils (CC & CA) are in France)
- Seat: Geneva
- Subdivisions: Canton of Geneva, Nyon District, 8 French intercommunal councils

Government
  - President: Antonio Hodgers (2018–present)

Area
  - Land: 1,996.4 km^{2} (770.8 sq mi)

Population (Jan. 2021)
  - Total: 1,046,168
  - Density: 524/km^{2} (1,360/sq mi)
- Established: 1 January 2013
- Language: French
- Website: www.grand-geneve.org

Grand Genève (English: Greater Geneva) is a local grouping of transnational cooperation (French: groupement local de coopération transfrontalière or GLCT), a public entity under Swiss law, in charge of organizing cooperation within the cross-border metropolitan area of Geneva (in particular metropolitan transports). The Grand Genève GLCT extends over Switzerland (entire Canton of Geneva and the canton of Vaud's entire Nyon District) and France (Pôle métropolitain du Genevois français, literally "Metropolitan hub of the French Genevan territory", a federation of eight French intercommunal councils in the departments of Ain and Haute-Savoie).

The Grand Genève GLCT covers a land area of 1,996 km^{2} (771 sq mi) (27.7% Swiss territory, 72.3% French territory) and had a population of 1,046,168 in Jan. 2021 (Swiss estimates and French census), 58.3% of them living on Swiss territory, and 41.7% on French territory.

== History ==
The city centre of Geneva is located only 1.9 km (1.2 mi) from the border of France. As a result, the urban area and the metropolitan area largely extend across the border on French territory. Due to the small size of the municipality of Geneva (16 km^{2} (6 sq mi)) and extension of the urban area over an international border, official bodies of transnational cooperation were developed as early as the 1970s to manage the cross-border Greater Geneva area at a metropolitan level.

In 1973, a Franco-Swiss agreement created the Comité régional franco-genevois ('Franco-Genevan Regional Committee', CRFG in French). In 1997 an 'Urban planning charter' of the CRFG defined for the first time a planning territory called agglomération franco-valdo-genevoise ('Franco-Vaud-Genevan urban area'). 2001 saw the creation of a Comité stratégique de développement des transports publics régionaux ('Strategic Committee for the Development of Regional Public Transports', DTPR in French), a committee which adopted in 2003 a 'Charter for Public Transports', first step in the development of a metropolitan, cross-border commuter rail network (see Léman Express).

In 2004, a public transnational body called Projet d’agglomération franco-valdo-genevois ('Franco-Vaud-Genevan urban area project') was created to serve as the main body of metropolitan cooperation for the planning territory defined in 1997, with more local French councils taking part in this new public body than in the CRFG created in 1973. Finally in 2012 the Projet d’agglomération franco-valdo-genevois was renamed Grand Genève ('Greater Geneva'), and the following year it was transformed into a Local Grouping of Transnational Cooperation (French: GLCT), a public entity under Swiss law, which now serves as the executive body of the Grand Genève.

== Organisation ==
=== Membership ===
The Grand Genève GLCT comprises 8 members and 2 associate members.

8 members:

- Canton of Geneva
- City of Geneva
- Canton of Vaud
- Region of Nyon (a federation of all the communes in the Nyon District to coordinate regional planning; note: the Nyon District is only a deconcentrated subdivision of the Canton of Vaud, and as such is not a legal person and is not member of Grand Genève, whereas the coterminous Region of Nyon is a legal person member of the Grand Genève GLCT)
- Pôle métropolitain du Genevois français (literally "Metropolitan hub of the French Genevan territory"), a syndicat mixte (federation) of six French intercommunal councils in the department of Haute-Savoie and two French intercommunal councils in the department of Ain
- Departmental council of Haute-Savoie
- Departmental council of Ain
- Regional council of Auvergne-Rhône-Alpes

2 associate members:

- French State
- Swiss Confederation

=== Territory ===
The territory over which the Grand Genève GLCT exercises cross-border cooperation and metropolitan planning, formerly known as agglomération franco-valdo-genevoise ('Franco-Vaud-Genevan urban area'), and now simply Grand Genève (although the former name is still used as a subtitle), is made up of the following areas:

- in Switzerland (553.2 km^{2})
  - entire Canton of Geneva (245.8 km^{2})
  - Canton of Vaud's entire Nyon District (307.4 km^{2})
- in France (1443.2 km^{2}):
  - Pôle métropolitain du Genevois français (literally 'Metropolitan hub of the French Genevan territory'), made up of:
    - six intercommunal councils in Haute-Savoie (812.5 km^{2}):
      - CA Thonon Agglomération (238.9 km^{2})
      - CA Annemasse - Les Voirons Agglomération (78.2 km^{2})
      - CC Arve et Salève (99.3 km^{2})
      - CC du Pays Rochois (93.9 km^{2})
      - CC Faucigny-Glières (150.7 km^{2})
      - CC du Genevois (151.5 km^{2})
    - two intercommunal councils in Ain (630.7 km^{2}):
      - CA du Pays de Gex (404.9 km^{2})
      - CC Terre Valserhône (formerly 'CC du Pays Bellegardien) (225.8 km^{2})

Abbreviations:

- CA: communauté d'agglomération ('agglomeration community')
- CC: communauté de communes ('community of communes')

=== Governance ===
The Grand Genève GLCT is governed by an assembly (assemblée du GLCT) made up of 24 members (12 Swiss members and 12 French members), appointed by the local Swiss and French councils making up the Grand Genève, and an executive board (bureau de l'assemblée) made up of 8 members chosen among the 24 assembly members. The 8 members of the executive board each represent one of the 8 public entities which form the Grand Genève GLCT (4 Swiss entities: Canton of Geneva, City of Geneva, Canton of Vaud, Region of Nyon; 4 French entities: Pôle métropolitain du Genevois français, departmental councils of Haute-Savoie and Ain, regional council of Auvergne-Rhône-Alpes).

One member of the executive board, since 2018 Antonio Hodgers, representative of the Canton of Geneva, is the president of the board and of the Grand Genève GLCT, while the 7 other board members are all vice-president of the board and Grand Genève GLCT.

The assembly of the GLCT meets three times a year, and is co-chaired by the Canton of Geneva, the Canton of Vaud and the Pôle métropolitain du Genevois français. The executive board meets three to four times a year, and is in charge of overseeing the various initiatives of the GLCT and of preparing the assembly meetings.

== Transportation ==
Map of the Léman Express rail network, as of 2019.

The territory of Grand Genève is served by various forms of public transport, including the Transports Publics Genevois network within the Canton of Geneva, the Léman Express commuter rail system, and the Compagnie Générale de Navigation sur le lac Léman boat network.

The Léman Express, a cross-border metropolitan rail network which links the suburbs of Geneva in France and in the canton of Vaud via tunnels under the city of Geneva (see CEVA rail), entered service in 2019 after more than 7 years of work and is a symbol of transnational urban cooperation in the Grand Genève territory.

The territory is served by Geneva Airport, which provides most domestic and international travel for the territory.
