= André Reymond =

Swiss politician (born 1940)

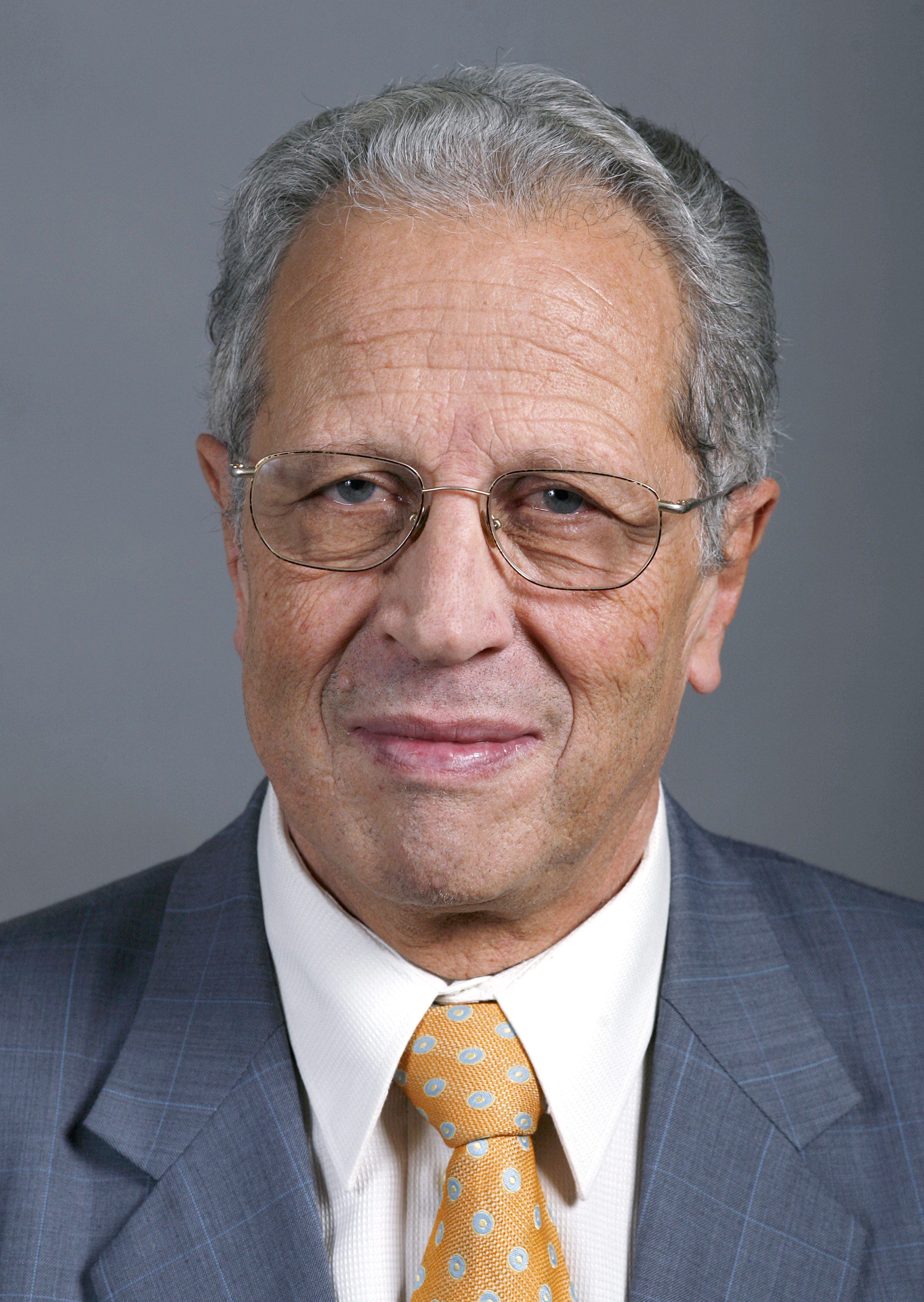
- Official portrait, 2007

Member of the National Council (Switzerland)
- In office 1 December 2003 – 4 December 2011
- Constituency: Canton of Geneva
- Succeeded by: Céline Amaudruz

Member of the Grand Council of Geneva
- In office 1 November 2001 – 13 November 2003

Personal details
- Born: André Reymond; 7 January 1940 (age 85) Bern, Switzerland
- Children: 2
- Occupation: Pension advisor
- Website: Official website (inactive); Parliament website

André Reymond (born 7 January 1940 in Bern) is a Swiss politician who served on the National Council (Switzerland) for the Swiss People's Party from 2003 to 2011, before being succeeded by Céline Amaudruz. He previously served on the Grand Council of Geneva from 2001 to 2003 and presided the Geneva chapter of the Swiss People's Party from 2005 to 2007.
