= Amaudruz =

Amaudruz is a surname. Notable people with the surname include:

- Céline Amaudruz (born 1979), Swiss banker, attorney and politician
- Gaston-Armand Amaudruz (1920–2018), Swiss neo-fascist political philosopher and Holocaust denier
