= Daniel Zappelli =

Daniel Zappelli is a Swiss juror, who served as Attorney General of the State and Canton of Geneva from 2002 to 2011.

== Early career ==
Zappelli studied law at the University of Fribourg, graduating in 1986 with the Swiss equivalent of a bachelor's degree in law. In 1989, he earned a seat at the Geneva Bar. He served as Deputy Attorney General in Geneva from 1996, and in January 2000 he became a judge at the Court of First Instance of the Geneva State Court of Justice.

== Geneva Attorney General: 2002-2011 ==
On 21 April 2002 Zappelli was elected Attorney General of the State and Canton of Geneva for the Parti radical, defeating the candidate of the left-alliance, Jean-Bernard Schmid. He assumed the post replacing Bernard Bertossa.

On 20 April 2008 Zappelli was re-elected, defeating the socialist candidate François Paychère. Zappelli announced his resignation as Attorney General on 7 November 2011, effective 31 March 2012. In an emergency appointment, on 1 December 2011, the Grand Council of Geneva chose Olivier Jornot to succeed Zappelli.
