= Grand Council of Appenzell Innerrhoden =

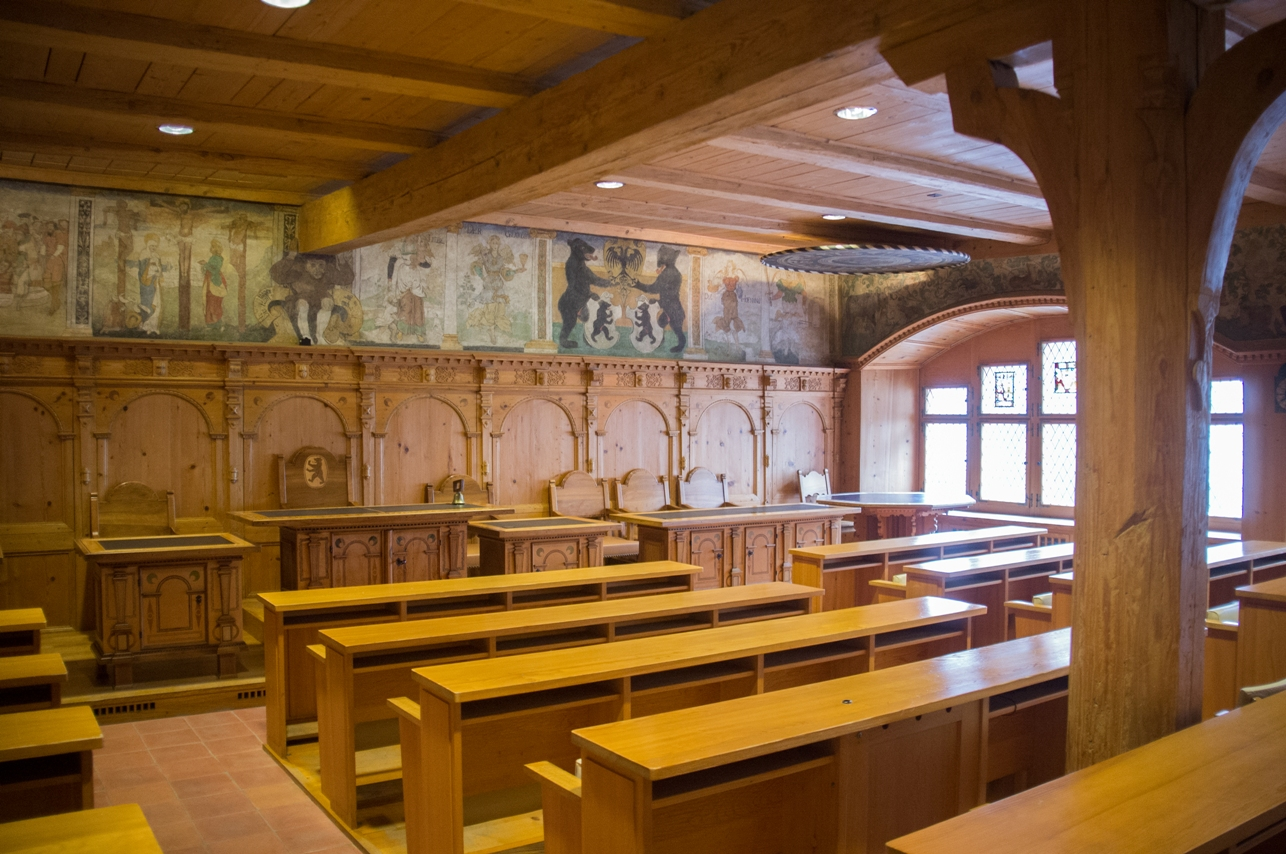
Grand Council Chamber in Appenzell

The Grand Council of the Canton of Appenzell Innerrhoden (German: Grosse Rat des Kantons Appenzell Innerrhoden) is the cantonal parliament of the Swiss canton of Appenzell Innerrhoden. Its seat is located at Marktgasse 2 in Appenzell, and meets five times a year. The number of its members has remained unchanged at 50 since 2015.

Albert Sutter is the President of the Grand Council.

== Role ==
According to the cantonal constitution, the Landsgemeinde (cantonal assembly) is the supreme authority in the canton of Appenzell Innerrhoden (Art. 19 of the cantonal constitution). It is responsible, usually once a year, for deciding on draft laws (mandatory referendum) and for electing the members of the cantonal government and the cantonal court (Art. 20 of the cantonal constitution).

The Grand Council drafts bills and constitutional amendments, which are then submitted to the Landsgemeinde (cantonal assembly) for a vote, and examines motions submitted by the cantonal government, other authorities, or individual voters for consideration by the Grand Council or the Landsgemeinde (Art. 26 of the Cantonal Constitution). It also determines the rules of procedure for the Landsgemeinde.

Since passing laws is a correspondingly complex process, the Grand Council is generally authorized by law to enact ordinances and regulations for their implementation, as these are not subject to a mandatory vote (Art. 27 of the Cantonal Constitution). The Grand Council also decides on joining or terminating intercantonal agreements, establishes the boundaries of districts and municipalities, decides on petitions for pardons within the scope of the law, and grants probate (Art. 28 of the Cantonal Constitution). Furthermore, it is responsible for overseeing the cantonal authorities. For example, it reviews and approves the state accounts (Art. 29 of the Cantonal Constitution).

According to Article 7 of the cantonal constitution, every eligible voter has the right to submit a popular initiative. Such an initiative must be submitted to the Grand Council by October 1st of each year in order to be presented at the next Landsgemeinde (cantonal assembly).

One-time expenditure decisions exceeding CHF 1,000,000 require popular approval, as do recurring expenditures exceeding CHF 200,000 over a period of at least five years (financial referendum). One-time expenditures exceeding CHF 250,000 or recurring expenditures exceeding CHF 50,000 over a period of at least five years are subject to an optional referendum. Such a referendum must be signed by 200 registered voters within thirty days. However, expenditures for the salaries of state employees are exempt from the optional referendum (Article 7 of the Cantonal Constitution).

The Grand Council elects the members of the Juvenile Court as the electoral authority (Article 6 of the Court Organization Act).

== Rules of Procedure ==
The constitution stipulates five sessions per year. At the June session, the Grand Council elects its president, vice-president, and three tellers for a one-year term (Article 29). Re-election is possible if one moves up in the hierarchy; the president is not eligible for re-election (Article 8 of the Grand Council's Rules of Procedure). Following a new election, the inaugural session is chaired by the oldest member of the Grand Council present (Article 6 GGR). The Grand Council is considered to have a quorum when a majority of its members are present (Article 14 GGR).

For the adoption of a motion or proposal, a relative majority is required, unless the constitution stipulates otherwise. Voting in the Grand Council is by show of hands, unless a secret ballot has been decided upon. The counting of votes may be waived in the case of an obvious majority, unless expressly requested by a member or the result is required for the Landsgemeinde mandate (Article 28 GGR). In the election of representatives to commissions and other offices, however, the candidate who receives an absolute majority is considered elected (Article 29 GGR).

The Grand Council of Appenzell Innerrhoden has the unique feature that, unlike almost all other cantonal parliaments, it does not require a formal swearing-in or induction ceremony for new members. Only the canton of Basel-Stadt also forgoes such a pledge.

The compensation of public employees in the canton of Appenzell Innerrhoden is governed by the Ordinance on Public Authorities. The President of the Grand Council initially receives a fixed annual compensation of 3,100 francs. All members of the Council receive a meeting allowance of 80 francs for a half day and 160 francs for a full day. The President receives a supplement of 20 francs for each half day.

Until 1995, the Landammann (Government President) also served as President of the Grand Council.

== Members ==
A constitutional amendment passed in 2011 fixed the number of members of the Grand Council at 50; this regulation was first applied in the 2015 elections. The new rule stipulates that each district is entitled to at least four seats, based on 4/50 of its population. The remaining 26 seats are allocated proportionally to the remaining population shares, rounding down any fractions. Residual seats are then 4/50 is the population figure recorded by the cantonal population register on the last day of the year preceding the election (Article 22 of the Cantonal Constitution).

Until the 2011–2015 legislative period, the rule was that each district (political municipality) elected one representative to the Grand Council for every 300 inhabitants. If more than 150 inhabitants remained, an additional member was elected. The decisive factor under the old rule was the result of the most recent census; therefore, the number of representatives could change after each new census.

Until 1995, the nine members of the Standeskommission (cantonal government) were voting members of the Grand Council.

== Constituencies ==
The constituency boundaries correspond to the boundaries of the five districts in the canton. As of 2023, the seats were distributed among the districts as follows:

District	Population (2022)	Mandates
Appenzell	5,864	18
Schwende-Rüte	6,050	18
Oberegg	1,928	6
Gonten	1,466	4
Schlatt-Haslen	1,108	4
