= Thomas Bläsi =

Swiss politician (born 1971)

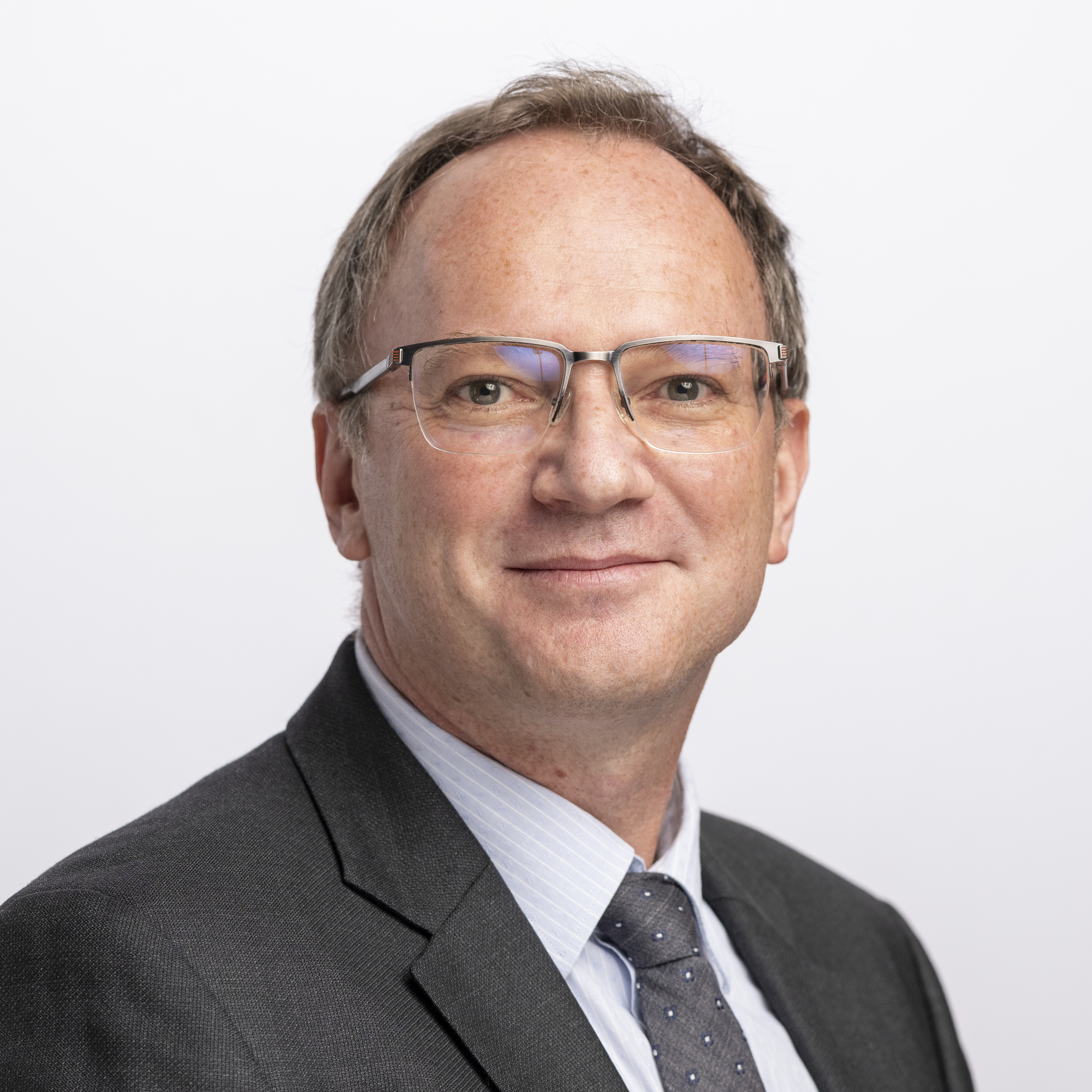

Member of the National Council (Switzerland)
- Incumbent
- Assumed office 30 May 2023
- Preceded by: Yves Nidegger
- Constituency: Canton of Geneva

Personal details
- Born: Thomas Bläsi; 17 April 1971 (age 54) Bourges, France
- Citizenship: Switzerland; France
- Party: Swiss People's Party
- Occupation: Pharmacist, politician
- Website: Parliament website

Thomas Bläsi also spelled Blaesi (born 17 April 1971) is a Swiss pharmacist and politician who currently serves as member of the National Council (Switzerland) for the Swiss People's Party since 2023. He entered the parliament as a replacement of Yves Nidegger on 30 May 2023, who resigned from parliament. This is a common procedure in many political systems to ensure that representation across different levels of the legislature is maintained.
