= Cantonal legislatures of Switzerland =

Parliament of a canton in Switzerland

Cantons shaded by the largest party in the cantonal parliament:
The Centre (DM/LC)
Swiss People's Party (SVP/UDC)
FDP.The Liberals (FDP/PLR)
Social Democratic Party (SP/PS)

The cantonal legislatures of Switzerland are the elected legislative bodies of the 26 Swiss cantons. Each canton has its own legislature, which operates alongside a cantonal executive and functions independently from the federal Federal Assembly. Legislatures are generally elected for four-year terms, except in the cantons of Fribourg, Vaud, Geneva, and Jura, where terms last five years.

The size and structure of cantonal legislatures vary. The largest is in the canton of Zürich with 180 members, while the smallest, in Appenzell Innerrhoden, has 49 members. Appenzell Innerrhoden is also the only canton with a formally non-partisan legislature; all others are organized along party political lines.

Party strength varies by canton. As of the most recent elections, the Swiss People's Party (SVP/UDC) holds the largest number of seats in nine legislatures, followed by The Centre (DM/LC) in eight, FDP.The Liberals (FDP/PLR) in seven, and the Social Democratic Party (SP/PS) in one.

Two cantons, Appenzell Innerrhoden and Glarus, use the traditional Landsgemeinde system of direct democracy, where eligible citizens vote by open assembly once a year. Although these assemblies are formally the highest legislative authorities, both cantons also maintain permanent representative legislatures, which are listed in this article.

== Terminology ==
The legislatures of the cantons have various names in different cantons and in the four official languages of Switzerland:

- Grand Council (German: Grosser Rat, French: Grand Conseil, Italian: Gran Consiglio, Romansh: Cussegl grond ) is the name in the cantons of Aargau, Appenzell Innerrhoden, Basel-Stadt, Bern, Fribourg, Geneva, Grisons, Neuchâtel, Ticino, Thurgau, Vaud and Valais. In German-speaking Switzerland, the members of the Grand Council are called Grand Councilor (Grossrat (m) or Grossrätin (f)), except for Thurgau where they are called Cantonal Councilor (Kantonsrat/rätin). In French-speaking Switzerland, the title is Député (Member of Parliament).
- Cantonal Council (German: Kantonsrat) in the cantons of Appenzell Ausserrhoden, Lucerne, Obwalden, Schaffhausen, Schwyz, Solothurn, St. Gallen, Zug and Zürich. The term arose in the 19th century; the older names were Grand Council: renamed in Solothurn 1840, in Zurich 1869, in Zug 1873, in Appenzell Ausserrhoden 1876, in Schaffhausen 2002, in St. Gallen 2003, in Lucerne 2008) and District Administrator (renaming in Schwyz 1833, in Obwalden 1867 ).
- State Council (German: Landrat) in the cantons of Basel-Landschaft, Glarus, Nidwalden and Uri.
- Parliament (French: Parlement) in the canton of Jura (since the canton was founded).

== List ==
Canton			Legislature Official name(s)	Members	Largest party	Last election	Next election
Aargau	AG	Aargau	Grand Council; Grosser Rat (German)	140	SVP (48)	2024	2028
Appenzell Ausserrhoden	AR	Appenzell Ausserrhoden	Cantonal Council; Kantonsrat (German)	65	FDP (22)	2023	2027
Appenzell Innerrhoden	AI	Appenzell Innerrhoden	Grand Council (Note: The ultimate legislative body is the annual Landsgemeinde.); Grosser Rat (German)	49	Non-partisan	2023	2027
Basel-City	BS	Basel-Stadt	Grand Council; Grosser Rat (German)	100	SP (31)	2024	2028
Basel-Country	BL	Basel-Landschaft	Landrat (German)	90	SVP (21)	2023	2027
Berne	BE	Bern	Grand Council; Grosser Rat (German); Grand Conseil (French)	160	SVP (44)	2022	2026
Fribourg	FR	Fribourg	Grand Council; Grand Conseil (French); Grosser Rat (German)	110	DM (26)	2021	2026
Geneva	GE	Geneva	Grand Council; Grand Conseil (French)	100	FDP (22)	2023	2028
Glarus	GL	Glarus	Landrat (German)	60	SVP (18)	2022	2026
Grisons	GR	Grisons	Grand Council; Grosser Rat (German); Cusegl grond (Romansh); Gran Consiglio (Italian)	120	DM (34)	2022	2026
Jura	JU	Jura	Parliament; Parlement (French)	60	DM (15)	2020	2025
Lucerne	LU	Lucerne	Cantonal Council; Kantonsrat (German)	120	DM (34)	2023	2027
Neuchâtel	NE	Neuchâtel	Grand Council; Grand Conseil (French)	115	FDP (32)	2021	2025
Nidwalden	NW	Nidwalden	Landrat (German)	60	FDP (16)	2022	2026
Obwalden	OW	Obwalden	Cantonal Council; Kantonsrat (German)	55	DM (19)	2022	2026
Schaffhausen	SH	Schaffhausen	Cantonal Council; Kantonsrat (German)	60	SVP (21)	2024	2028
Schwyz	SZ	Schwyz	Cantonal Council; Kantonsrat (German)	100	SVP (38)	2024	2028
Solothurn	SO	Solothurn	Cantonal Council; Kantonsrat (German)	100	FDP (22)	2021	2025
St. Gallen	SG	St. Gallen	Cantonal Council; Kantonsrat (German)	120	SVP (42)	2024	2028
Thurgau	TG	Thurgau	Grand Council; Grosser Rat (German)	130	SVP (42)	2024	2028
Ticino	TI	Ticino	Grand Council; Gran Consiglio (Italian)	90	FDP (23)	2023	2027
Uri	UR	Uri	Landrat (German)	64	DM (22)	2024	2028
Valais	VS	Valais	Grand Council; Grand Conseil (French); Grosser Rat (German)	130	DM (48)	2021	2025
Vaud	VD	Vaud	Grand Council; Grand Conseil (French)	150	FDP (50)	2022	2027
Zug	ZG	Zug	Cantonal Council; Kantonsrat (German)	80	DM (21)	2022	2026
Zurich	ZH	Zürich	Cantonal Council; Kantonsrat (German)	180	SVP (45)	2023	2027

== See also ==
- List of cantonal executives of Switzerland
- Municipal executive in Switzerland
