= Laurence Fehlmann Rielle =

Swiss politician (born 1955)

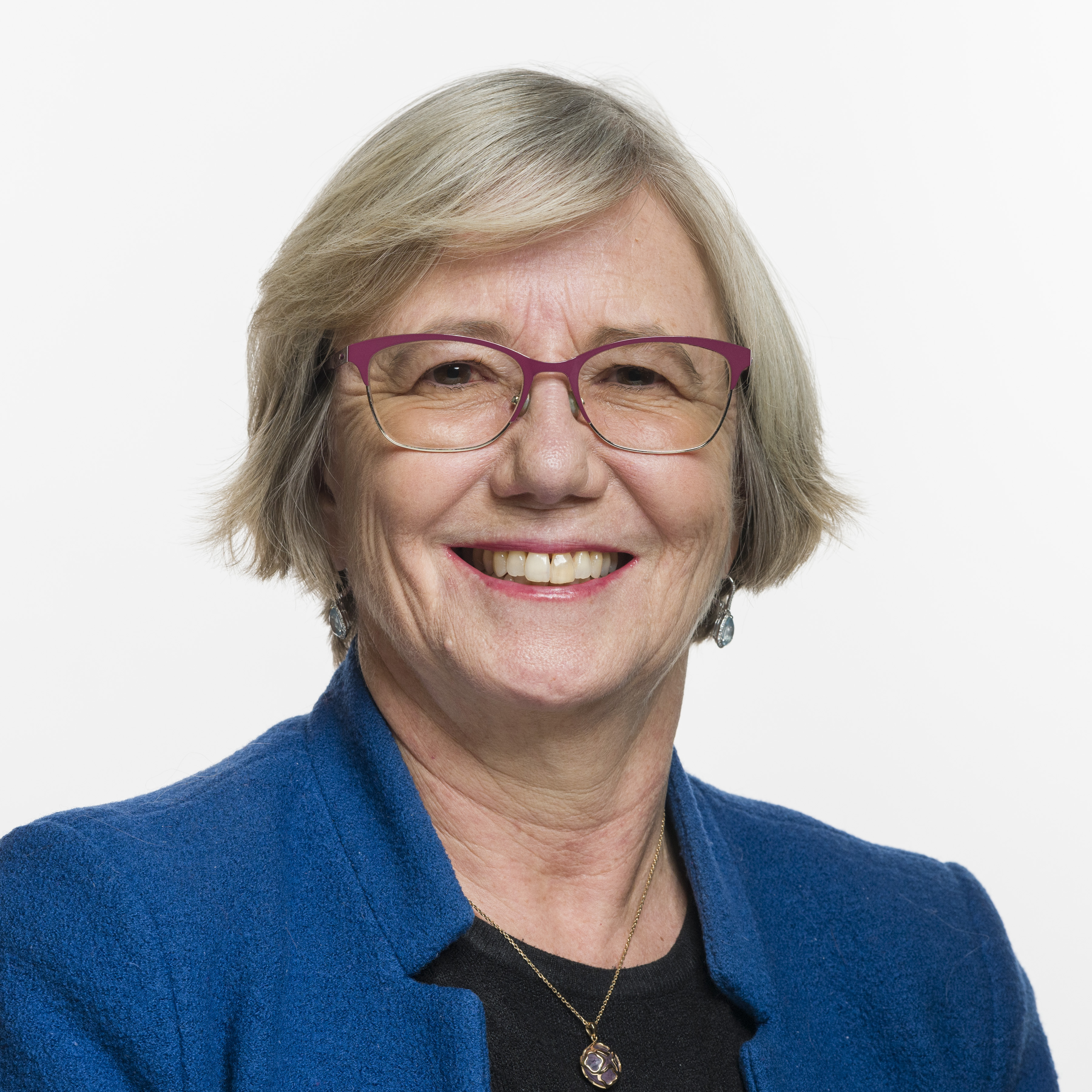
- Official portrait, 2019

Member of National Council (Switzerland)
- Incumbent
- Assumed office 30 November 2015
- Constituency: Canton of Geneva

Member of Grand Council of Geneva
- In office 6 November 1997 – 5 November 2009

Personal details
- Born: Laurence Marcelle Fehlmann; 11 September 1955 (age 71) Chêne-Bougeries
- Citizenship: Switzerland; Turkey (by marriage)
- Spouse: Jean-Charles Rielle (m. 1992)
- Education: IDHEAP (Diploma); University of Geneva (MAS)
- Website: Official website

Laurence Marcelle Fehlmann Rielle (née Fehlmann; born 11 September 1955) is a Swiss politician who currently serves on the National Council (Switzerland) for the Social Democratic Party since 2015. She previously served on the Grand Council of Geneva from 1997 to 2009.
