= Fabienne Fischer =

Swiss lawyer and politician

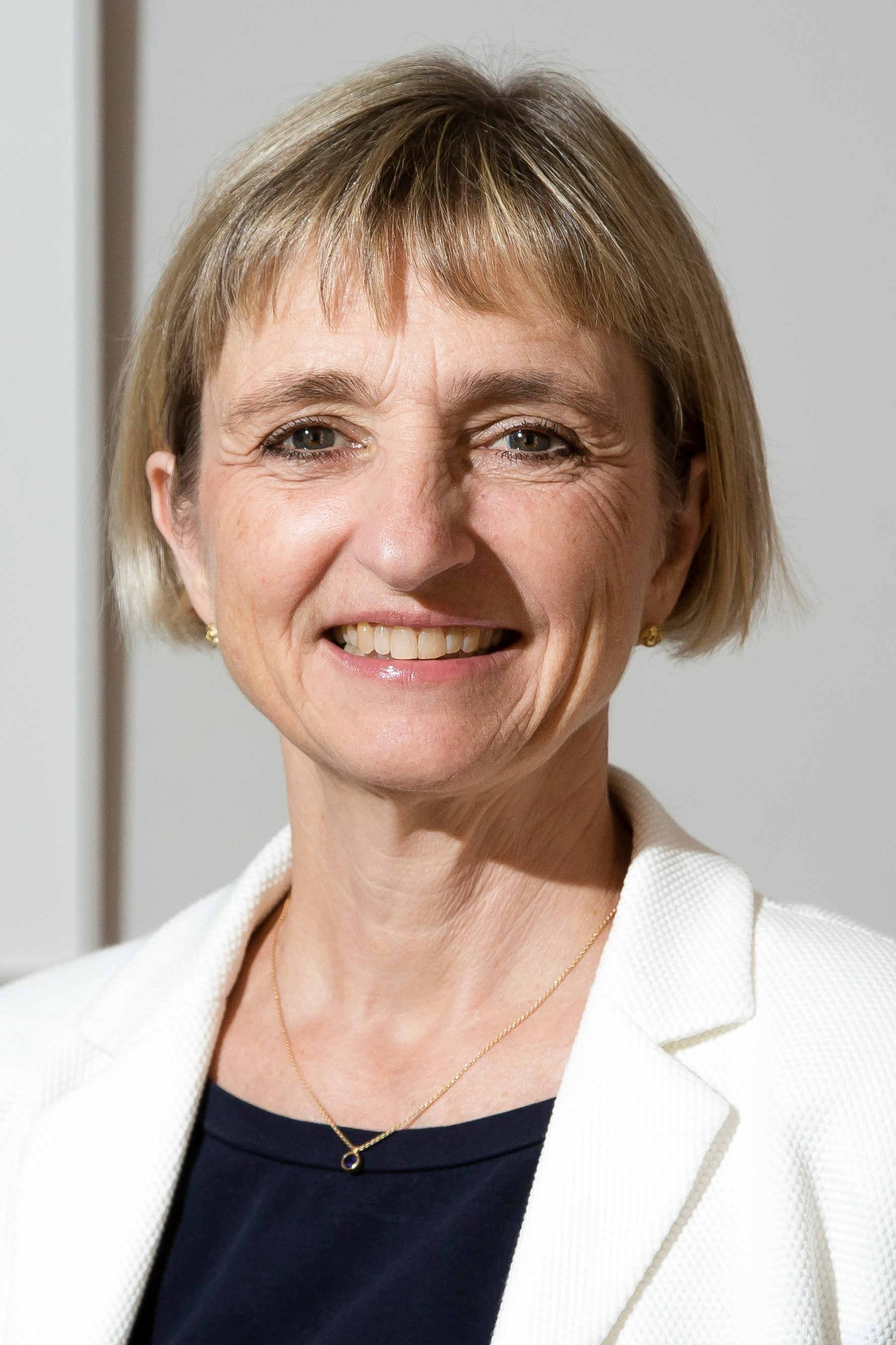
- Born: 1961 (age 64–65); Zambia
- Education: University of Geneva; Master's degrees in History and Law
- Title: State Councillor

Fabienne Fischer, born in 1961 in Zambia, is a lawyer and Swiss politician, a member of the Green Party of Switzerland, elected at the Council of State by-elections for the canton of Geneva on 21 March 2021. In charge of the Department of Economy and Employment, she lost her seat in the election in 2023 to Social-Democratic candidate Carol-Anne Kast.

== Early life and education ==
Fischer was born in Zambia (at that point a British colony), where she spent the first two years of her life, with her parents and two brothers. Her parents were committed Protestants. Her mother, Nicole, was president of the Protestant Church of Geneva (the first woman to take this post) and her father, Jean, was Secretary general for the Conference of European Churches. The family then travelled back to Geneva where Fabienne Fischer went to school in Grand-Saconnex.

In 1985, Fischer was a student at the University of Geneva, where she chaired the Scholarship Board for the National Students’ Union of Switzerland. After a graduate degree in History, she taught humanities from 1987 to 2003 at a local school. She earned second master's degree in law in 2002 and the Geneva bar in 2005. Her work as a lawyer consisted of administrative and employment law, as well as family law and amicable settlements of disputes.

== Political career ==
Fischer has been a member of the Green Party of Switzerland since 2007. She was elected municipal councillor for the city of Geneva in 2011, but stepped down in 2012 for professional reasons. In 2021, she became a member of the cantonal office for the Green Party of Switzerland and co-president for the Lancy area. She sat on the board of directors of the Geneva International Airport from 2012 to 2018, followed by the same role for the Hospice général (welfare office).

Fischer won the by-election held on 28 March 2021 for the Council of State of Geneva (41.82%), against the resigning Councillor of State Pierre Maudet (33.6%). She was sworn in on 29 April 2021. Running again for the 2023 regular election, she finished eighth and lost her seat to Carole-Anne Kast.

== Other ==
Fischer has three children.
