= Compulsory Measures Court =

Institution of Swiss criminal law

The Compulsory Measures Court (German: Zwangsmassnahmengericht, French: Tribunal des mesures de contrainte, Italian: Tribunale delle misure coercitive) is an institution of Swiss Criminal law. It rules on the provisional detention ("pre-trial detention") of an accused person, as well as on other compulsory measures.

== Competences ==
A decision of the Compulsory Measures Court is required to order the following measures:

- Provisional detention;
- Detention for security reasons;
- Other compulsory measures;
- DNA sampling;
- Surveillance of correspondence;
- Technical surveillance measures;
- Surveillance of banking relationships;
- Mission of an undercover agent;

Other compulsory measures do not need to be referred to the Compulsory Measures Court, such as the Swiss criminal law mandate.

Compulsory measures infringe fundamental rights and must comply with a number of conditions, including the principle of proportionality.
