= Céline Amaudruz =

Swiss politician (born 1979)

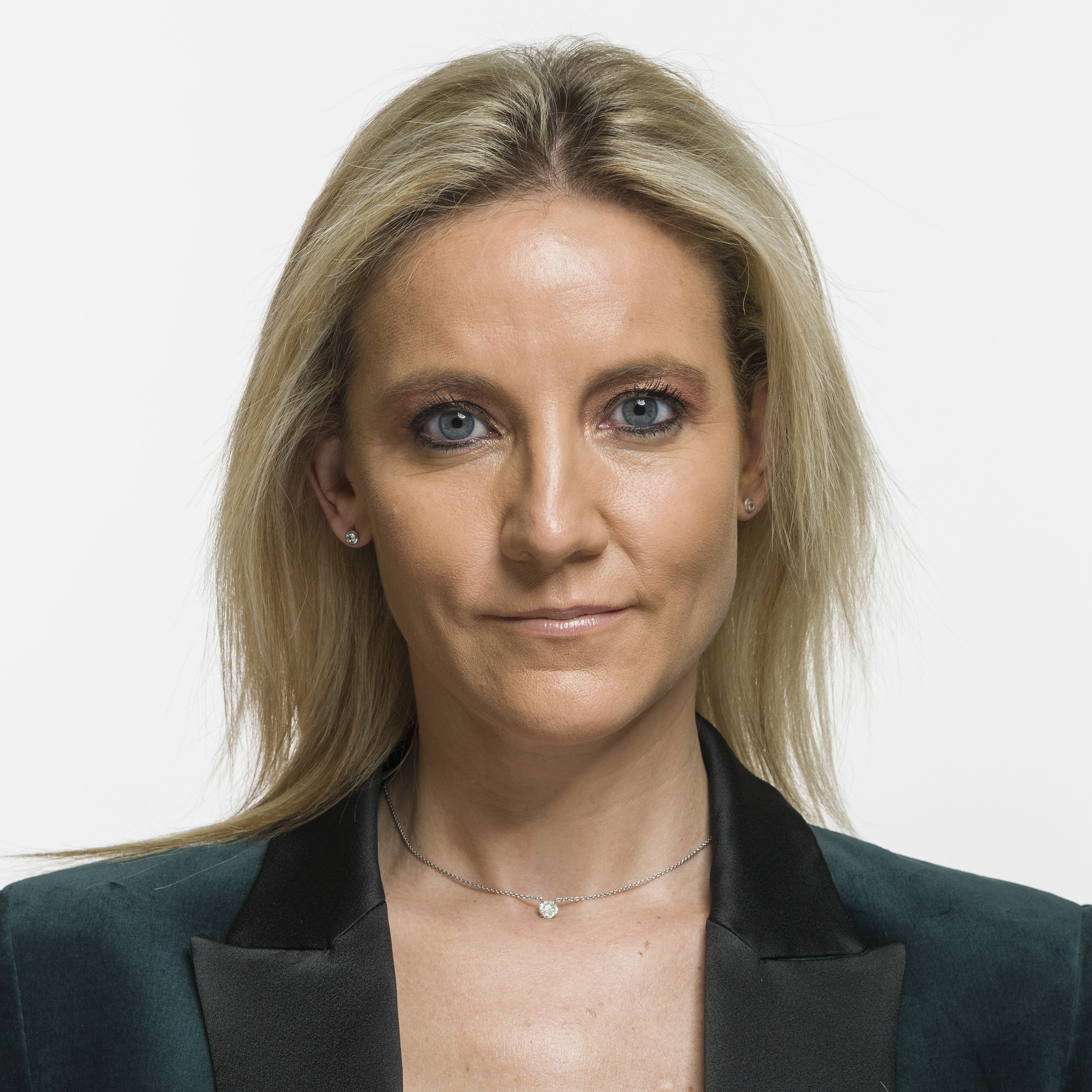
- Official portrait, 2019

Member of the National Council
- In office 5 December 2011
- Preceded by: André Reymond
- Constituency: Canton of Geneva

Vice President of the Swiss People's Party
- In office 23 April 2016
- President: Albert Rösti (until 2020); Marco Chiesa (since 2020)

Personal details
- Born: Céline Marie-Claire Amaudruz; 15 March 1979 (age 47) Geneva, Switzerland
- Party: Swiss People's Party
- Spouse: Michael Andersen (m. 2021)
- Children: 2
- Education: University of Geneva (Licentiate); IMD Business School (MBA)
- Occupation: Banker; attorney; politician
- Website: Parliament website

Céline Marie-Claire Amaudruz (French pronunciation: [selin amodʁy]; born 15 March 1979) is a Swiss banker, attorney and politician who currently serves in the National Council for the Swiss People's Party since 2011. Amaudruz previously served as president of the Grand Council of Geneva between 2010 and 2016.

She is among the richest Swiss politicians in the legislative estimated by Handelszeitung. In October of 2026, Amaudruz announced candidacy for Federal Council, to succeed Guy Parmelin.

== Early life and education ==
Amaudruz was born 15 March 1979 in Geneva, Switzerland, the younger of two daughters, to Michel Max Amaudruz (1939–2022) and Dominique Amaudruz (née Guiramand), both attorneys, into an affluent Protestant family. She has one sister.

Her paternal family originated in Savoy in the Western Alps, France and acquired citizenship (bourgeoisie) of Lutry, in the canton of Vaud, in 1589. Her maternal family is originally from France. Her father, Michel Amaudruz, served on the Grand Council of Geneva for the Swiss People's Party.

Amaudruz studied law at the University of Geneva (Licentiate) and holds a Master of Business Administration (MBA) from IMD Business School.

== Career ==
Initially, she spent six years for her parents Law firm, both practicing lawyers. She worked for the law firm Poncet Turrettini Amaudruz Neyroud & Associes in Geneva during her studies, in which her father was a partner. Later she engaged in wealth management at UBS and Julius Bär. Amaudruz currently works as a relationship manager in wealth management for REYL & Cie, a private bank in Geneva.

Amaudruz currently serves on the board of directors of Steiner Mühle in Lauperswil, TP Publicité SA, Groupe Minoteries SA and Transport public genevois (TPG) in Lancy. She is on the board of trustees of Fondation de prévoyance en faveur du personel tpg and Fondation de prévoyange en faveur du personel du groupe Minoteries SA (both private pension funds).

== Politics ==
Amaudruz began her political career while serving in the Grand Council of Geneva between October 2009 and October 2011. She was ultimately elected into the National Council (Switzerland) for the Swiss People's Party during the 2011 Swiss federal election and subsequently re-elected in the 2015 Swiss federal election. Between 2011 and 2015, she simultaneously served on the municipal council of Puplinge, Switzerland. She was also cantonal president of the Swiss People's Party in Geneva from 2010 to 2016. Since 2016 she is vice president of the Swiss People's Party.

She is the richest politician in the Swiss legislative from French-speaking Switzerland.

== Personal life ==
In 2021, Amaudruz married Michael Andersen (born 1991), a tax advisor and municipal councilor, at the town hall of Vandœuvres in a civil ceremony. The wedding reception in Chouilly, France, was attended by 210 guests including Guy Parmelin, Christian Lüscher and Hugues Hiltpold. They have two daughters.
