= Antonio Hodgers =

Swiss politician

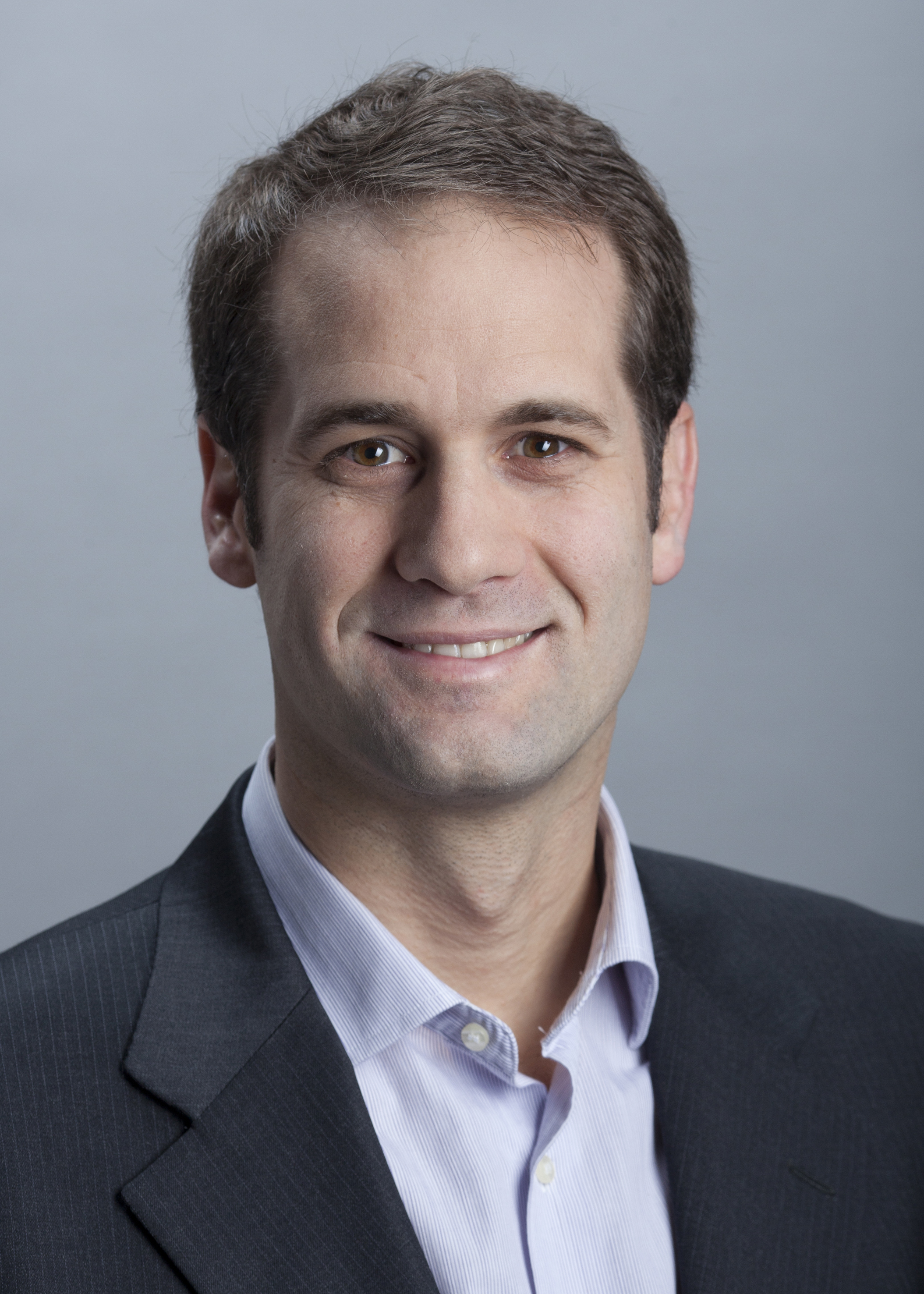

Geneva State Councillor
- Incumbent
- Assumed office 10 December 2013

Personal details
- Born: 6 February 1976 (age 50) Buenos Aires, Argentina
- Party: Green Party of Switzerland
- Education: IUHEI

Antonio Hodgers (born 7 February 1976 in Buenos Aires) is a Swiss politician and member of the Green Party of Switzerland. He has been Councillor of State of Geneva since December 2013, and president of the Council of State from 13 September 2018 to 17 October 2020.

== Biography ==
=== Education and early life ===
The son of a lawyer father and dancer/choreographer mother who both opposed the dictatorship in Argentina, he reached Switzerland in 1981 with his sister and mother after having passed through Italy and Mexico. He obtained political refugee status in 1983.

Antonio Hodgers studied at the Graduate Institute of International and Development Studies, receiving a degree in international relations in 1999 and an advanced degree in development studies in 2003.

With his interest in entrepreneurship, in 2002 he launched dvdmania.ch, a DVD rental and sale business running on bike delivery, followed by Mobilidée where took on the roles of managing partner and mobility manager in this office of sustainable mobility consulting for public authorities and private companies. He ran the company until his accession to the Council of State in December 2013.

=== Early political career ===
Between 1993 and 1996, he sat in the Youth Parliament of Meyrin, a municipality of the canton of Geneva, an assembly which he chaired in 1995–1996. His political involvement then continued at a canton level. Between 1998 and 2006, he chaired the association "J’y vis, J’y vote" ("I live here, I vote here"), which promotes the political rights of foreign citizens on a municipal level. He would go on to be the campaign manager for referendum campaigns in 2001 and 2005, the date on which foreign nationals in Geneva who have been settled in Switzerland for 8 years obtained the right to vote at local elections.

In 1997, he was elected to The Grand Council (Parliament) of Geneva. He was the youngest member of the assembly. He would then go on to be member of the Bureau (1999-2001), and then group chairman (2002 and 2003). Between 2006 and 2008, he was the head of the Genevan branch of the Green Party of Switzerland. He served in the canton's parliament until 2007.

In 2007, he was elected to the National Council (Lower house of the Federal Assembly), and then re-elected in 2011, holding the presidency of the Green Party of Switzerland parliamentary group from 2010 onwards, where he was said to represent the "pragmatic" side of the party.

In 2012, Antonio Hodgers was one of only a handful of people from Romandy to be invited — upon official invitation from Jean-Daniel Gerber, the president de the Swiss Public Utility Society — to make the 1 August speech in the Grütli meadows, as part of the Swiss National Day.

== Geneva Councillor of State ==
On 10 November 2013, he was elected to the Council of State of Geneva. He stepped down from the National Council on 26 November 2013 and was replaced by Anne Mahrer.

He was sworn in on 10 December 2013, and took over the former Planning Department, which was reconstructed and renamed the Department of Development, Housing, and Energy (Département de l'aménagement, du logement et de l'énergie - DALE). This department is responsible for areas relating to land use development (from cantonal and regional master planning to construction permits), housing, cultural heritage, and energy. The department also oversees the Geneva Industrial Services at a political level, and public property foundations.

In 1993, Antonio Hodgers also became one of the founders of the "Noctambus", a night-time transport service in Geneva, with a transport network which gradually extended to all Geneva municipalities, then to the canton of Vaud, and neighbouring France. Hodgers also served on the board of directors for the Geneva Public Transport (1998-2008).

He was re-elected as Councillor of State (in 4th place) on 6 May 2018. He remained in charge of the Department of Development, which found itself supplemented by an environmental division.

On 13 September 2018, he was provisionally named president of the Council of State of Geneva as a replacement for Pierre Maudet who was under criminal proceedings. He was named as the permanent president on 23 January 2019 and left the position as a part of the regular rotation a year later to Anne Emery-Torracinta.
