= Stéfanie Prezioso =

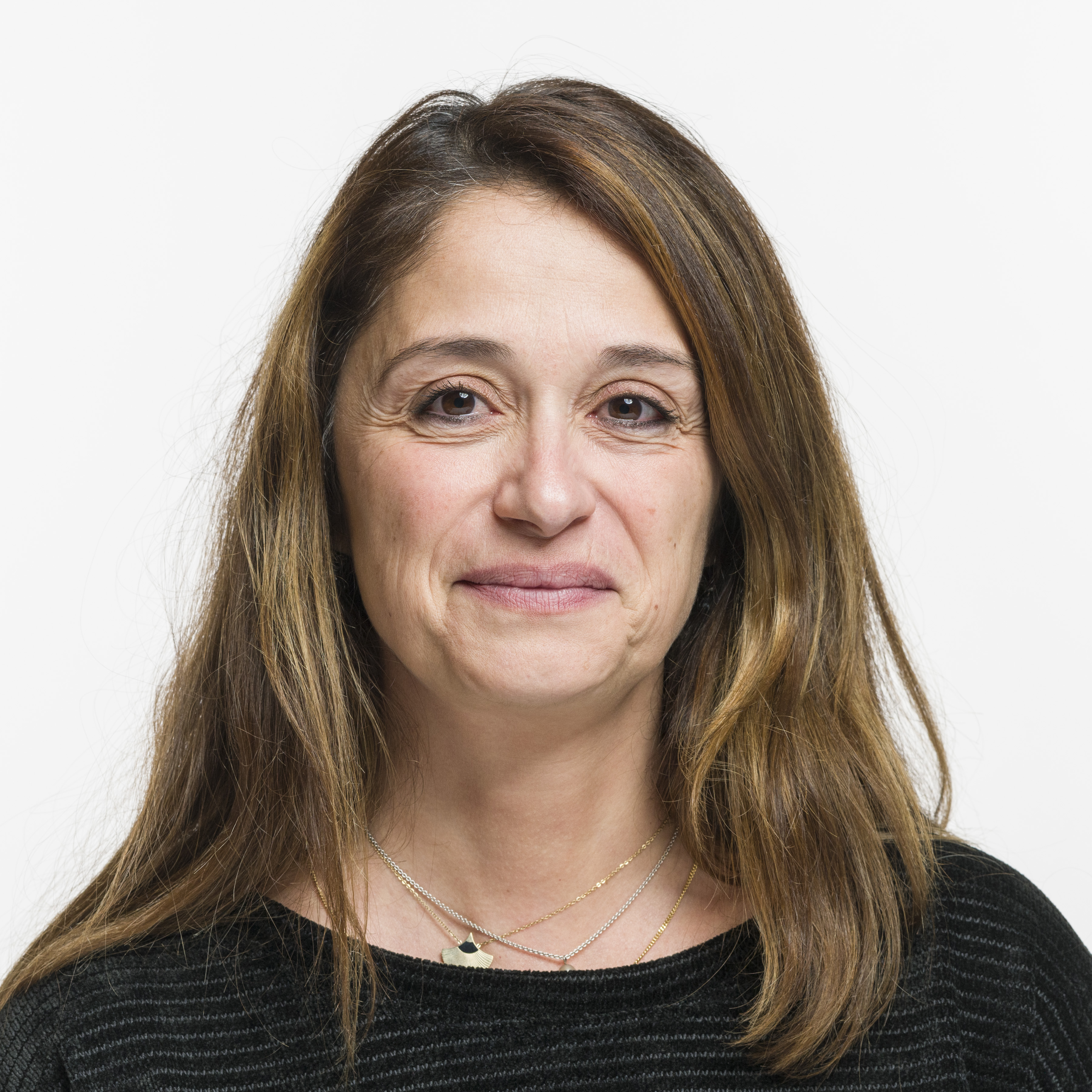
- Official portrait, 2019

Member of the National Council (Switzerland)
- Incumbent
- Assumed office 2 December 2019
- Constituency: Canton of Geneva

Personal details
- Born: Stefania Prezioso; 25 January 1969 (age 57) La Chaux-de-Fonds, Switzerland
- Party: Solidarity
- Website: Official website

Stefanié Prezioso (née Stefania Prezioso; born 25 January 1969 in La Chaux-de-Fonds) is a Swiss-Italian historian, professor and politician who currently serves on the National Council (Switzerland) since 2019. She is a member of the furthest left-wing Solidarity party.

== Early life and education ==
Prezioso was born 25 January 1969 in La Chaux-de-Fonds, Switzerland to Italian parents. Her father hailed from Naples, Italy and came to work in the horological industry. Her mother was Sicilian and a former member of the Italian Communist Party. She holds both Italian and Swiss nationality.

== Politics ==
Prezioso assumed office as member of the National Council (Switzerland) on 2 December 2019. She previously served on the municipal council of Geneva between 2014 and 2015.
