= Pierre Maudet =

Swiss and French politician

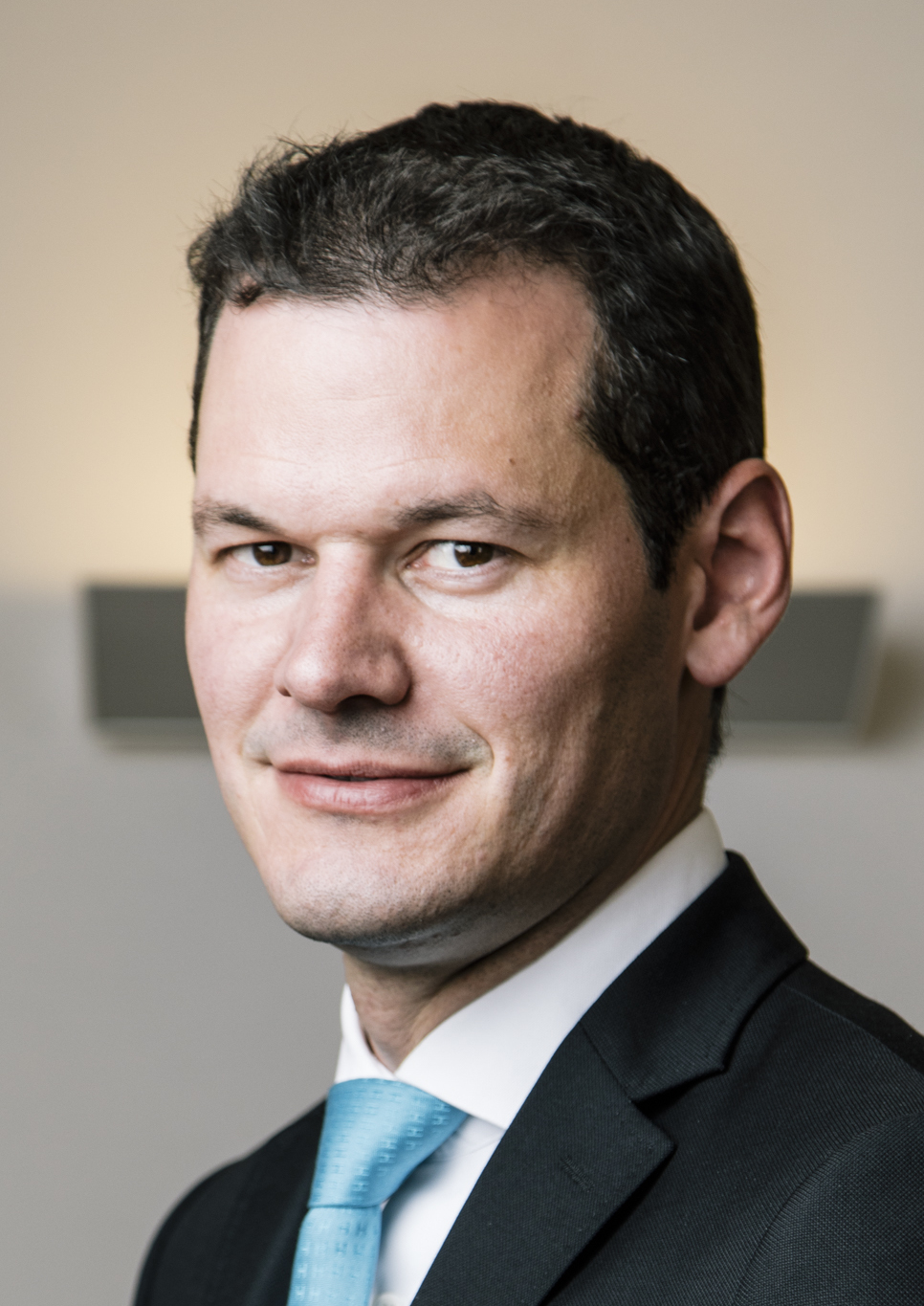

Member of Council of State of Geneva
- Incumbent
- Assumed office 1 June 2023
- In office 17 June 2012 – 1 March 2021
- Preceded by: Mark Muller
- Succeeded by: Fabienne Fischer

Mayor of Geneva
- In office 1 June 2011 – 31 May 2012
- Preceded by: Sandrine Salerno
- Succeeded by: Rémy Pagani

Geneva Administrative Council
- In office 1 June 2007 – 20 June 2012

Personal details
- Born: 6 March 1978 (age 48) Geneva, Switzerland
- Party: Liberté et Justice sociale (since 2022)
- Other political affiliations: FDP (until 2009); FDP.The Liberals (2009–2020); Independent (2020–2022)
- Children: 3
- Education: University of Fribourg

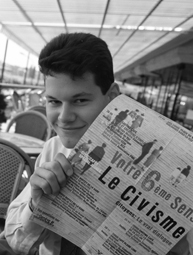
Pierre Maudet in 1995

Pierre Maudet (born 6 March 1978) is a Swiss and French politician. A former member of FDP.The Liberals, he was the mayor of Geneva from 1 June 2011 to 31 May 2012.

Long described as "prodigy" of Swiss politics, Maudet became embroiled in a series of legal battles after a controversial undeclared all-expense trip to Abu Dhabi. Maudet ended up being expelled from the Geneva branch of the FDP, resigned from his position at the cantonal government in 2021 and lost his bid for re-election to Green Party candidate Fabienne Fischer.

Running again with his own party Liberté et Justice sociale ("Freedom and Social Justice"), Maudet is re-elected to the Geneva Council of State in April 2023.

== Biography ==
Pierre Maudet is the son of Henri Maudet (born 1948), a Frenchman who first studied theology in Paris before moving to Geneva, Switzerland and becoming a lawyer, and Susanna Willy (born 1943), a teacher. Maudet was born on 6 March 1978 in Geneva and attended the University of Fribourg.

On 17 June 2012, he was elected to the Council of State of Geneva, the executive council of the Canton of Geneva with 40,966 votes out of 104,375 cast.

In 2017, he was nominated by his party to run for the Federal Council. He lost the election in the second ballot receiving 90 votes against Ignazio Cassis who received 125 votes and therefore achieved the absolute majority. The election took place on 20 September 2017.

In 2018, he writes a regular column in the German-speaking newspaper Blick.

=== Controversial 2015 expenses-paid trip to Abu Dhabi ===
In November 2015, Pierre Maudet and his family, his former chief of staff Patrick Baud-Lavigne and Antoine Daher, a friend active in real estate in Geneva, made a luxury trip to Abu Dhabi. Pierre Maudet initially claimed until May 2018 that the trip, including business class flights, accommodation at the Emirates Palace and access to the Formula One race was a private trip, paid for by his friend and it was by chance that he met Sheikh Mohammed bin Zayed Al Nahyan, Crown Prince of Abu Dhabi. Following this meeting, he held talks with senior officials on political issues.

A police report on the trip was submitted to the courts in August 2017, and proceedings were opened against an unknown person, Pierre Maudet and his chief of staff.

In August 2018, the public prosecutor claims Pierre Maudet accepted flights and accommodation for an amount estimated at several tens of thousands of Swiss francs.

While denying a conflict of interest, Pierre Maudet then admitted “having hidden part of the truth”.

In September 2018, the Council of State of Geneva decided to temporarily withdraw the Presidential Department from Pierre Maudet, now entrusted to Antonio Hodgers. Pierre Maudet also lost responsibility for the police to Mauro Poggia and for Geneva Airport to Serge Dal Busco.

On 23 November 2018, an online petition on change.org was launched urging Maudet to resign and Pierre Maudet was criticized by Swiss Liberal Party president Petra Gössi, who stated: "If I were Pierre Maudet, I would have already resigned".

In July 2020, Swiss FDP committee voted 22 for-1 opposed-1 abstention for expulsion of M. Pierre Maudet from Swiss FDP party for ethics violations regarding his acceptance and inaccurate reporting regarding Dubai travel and acceptance of related gratuities. On 29 October 2020 he announced his resignation from his government position, adding that he would run again in the subsequent March 2021 election. He was found guilty of accepting illegal advantages on 22 February 2021 and given a suspended 300 day-fine sentence. Maudet then lost his bid for re-election to the Geneva Cantonal government in a run-off to Green candidate Fabienne Fischer. He nevertheless indicated his intention to remain politically active. On 3 May 2021 a local cybersecurity company announced his hiring.

=== Return to politics ===
In January 2023, Pierre Maudet launches a re-election bid under the banner of the Liberté et Justice sociale ("Freedom and Social Justice") party that he created. He finishes sixth, thus securing a seat at the Geneva Council of State.

== See also ==
- Politics of Switzerland

== Books ==
- Philippe Reichen: Pierre Maudet − sein Fall. Stämpfli, Bern 2019, ISBN 978-3-7272-6048-3.

Political offices
Preceded by Sandrine Salerno	Mayor of Geneva; 2011–2012	Succeeded by Rémy Pagani
