= Grand Council of Geneva =

Legislature of the canton of Geneva, Switzerland

Grand Council of Geneva Grand Conseil de Genève
- 3rd legislature of the Grand Council
- Logo of the canton of Geneva

Type
- Type: Unicameral

History
- Founded: February 1526 as Council of Two Hundred October 1846 modern elected parliament October 2012 current constitution

Leadership
- President: Ana Roch (MCG) since 22 May 2025
- 1st Vice-President: Dilara Bayrak (Ve) since 22 May 2025
- 2nd Vice-President: Guy Mettan (UDC) since 22 May 2025

Structure
- Seats: 100
- Political groups: FDP.The Liberals (22) Social Democratic Party (18) Green Party (15) Geneva Citizens' Movement (14) Swiss People's Party (12) Freedom and Social Justice (10) The Centre (9)

Elections
- Voting system: Party-list proportional representation
- Last election: 2 April 2023
- Next election: In or before April 2028

Meeting place
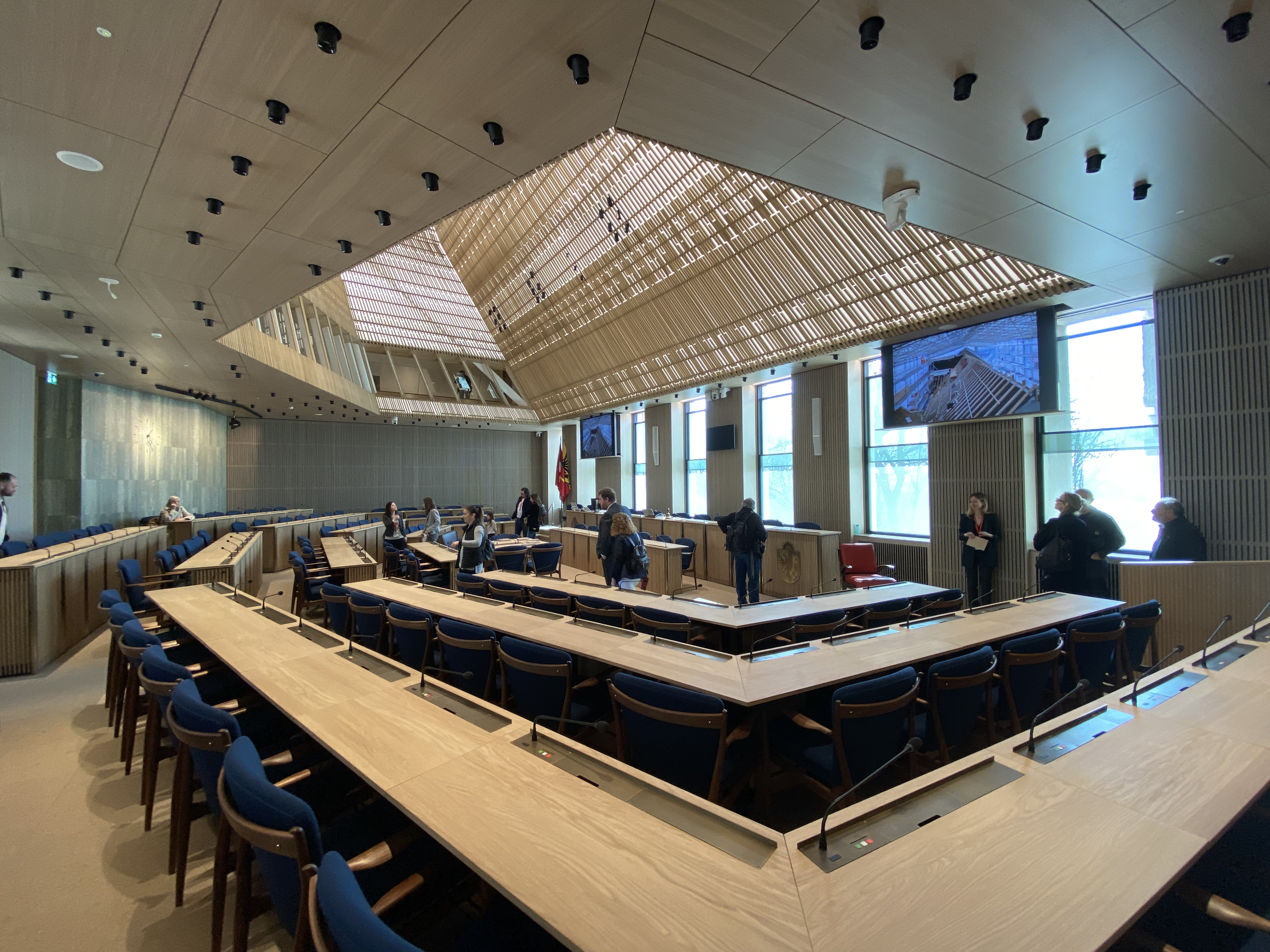
- Geneva City Hall; Geneva, Canton of Geneva; Switzerland

Website
- ge.ch/grandconseil/

Constitution
- Constitution of the Republic and canton of Geneva (French)

The Grand Council of Geneva (Note: Formally the Grand Council of the Republic and canton of Geneva.) (French: Grand Conseil de Genève) is the unicameral cantonal legislature of the Republic and Canton of Geneva. It consists of 100 deputies, together with substitute members, elected for five-year terms. Under Geneva's constitutional order, it is the canton's legislative authority.

The institution traces its origins to the Council of Two Hundred, first assembled in 1526. A Grand Council as Geneva's legislative body was established by the 1842 constitution, and the current five-year term dates from the constitution adopted in 2012. The Grand Council votes laws, the cantonal budget, and the state's financial statements, exercises high supervision over the Council of State and the cantonal administration, rules on popular initiatives, and exercises the right of pardon.

== Secretary ==
The office of the secretary of the Grand Council of Geneva is headed by the sautier; originally, the role of the sautier was military, and he was the head of the watch. Over time, the function changed and the sautier became the permanent secretary of the Grand Council.

One of his duties include the regular observation of the Geneva official chestnut tree, and the recording of the date of the opening of the first leaf on an official register. This event is then announced to the press and to the general public, indicating the beginning of the Spring.

== Members and elections ==
=== Eligibility and term ===
The Grand Council comprises 100 deputies elected for a term of five years, in alternation with communal elections. Any person enjoying cantonal political rights, that is, a Swiss citizen aged at least 18 who is resident in the canton and not subject to a general deputyship for mental incapacity, is eligible. The mandate is renewable without limit, though several parties impose internal caps on the number of consecutive terms a member may serve.

The office is incompatible with membership of the Council of State. A member of the cantonal government who is elected as a deputy may sit only after renouncing the executive office, and must make that choice within a short statutory deadline or be deemed to have declined the seat. A salaried political assistant of the Grand Council may not be a deputy, and the same applies to substitute deputies.

=== Substitute deputies ===
Alongside the 100 full deputies, there are substitute deputies (députés suppléants). When a seat falls vacant during the legislature, the secretariat-general invites the relevant electoral district office to fill it within five weeks, and the first eligible substitute on the same list is proclaimed elected. Should that person decline, the next substitute is called, and if no substitute remains a by-election is held. The function of substitute deputy is tied to membership of a parliamentary group. A substitute who leaves the group has the function suspended until possible swearing-in as an independent.

=== Electoral system ===
Deputies are elected by party-list proportional representation in a single canton-wide constituency, comprising all 45 communes, that has applied since 1933. Geneva does not allow the cumulation of a single candidate on a list, as is possible in federal elections, but it does permit the linking of lists (apparentement). The lists of several parties that declare a connection before the vote are treated as a single list for the purpose of seat allocation, which is advantageous in the distribution of remaining seats.

Seat allocation is subject to a threshold of 7% of the valid list votes. Lists that fail to reach it are excluded from the distribution and their votes are lost. At 7%, it is higher than in any other Swiss canton and is regarded as a high barrier to entry. The federal elections to the National Council held in the canton are, by contrast, subject to no quorum.

Once the votes are counted, the Council of State publishes the results in the Feuille d'avis officielle, and the Grand Council itself, acting on a report from the Council of State, validates the election of its own members.

=== Remuneration ===
Membership of the Grand Council is not a full-time salaried office but is compensated through attendance fees (jetons de présence) rather than a fixed salary. Each deputy receives an attendance fee for every sitting of the Council, the Bureau, a committee or a parliamentary group that they attend. The fee is increased by 50% for the chair of a sitting and for committee rapporteurs, and no fee is paid for committee meetings held entirely during a plenary sitting. In the final year of each legislature the Bureau, after consulting the group leaders and hearing the Council of State, fixes the amounts of the indemnities due to deputies for the following legislature. The attendance fees are subject to income tax, after a standard deduction for expenses and after any retention that a group asks the secretariat-general to operate on its members fees.

Public funding also flows to the parties. The law allocates 100'000 francs each year to the political parties represented in the Grand Council, together with an annual sum of 7'000 francs for each deputy elected on their list, both amounts indexed to the Geneva consumer price index at the start of each legislature. In practice, deputies retrocede part of their attendance fees to their party.
