= Council of State of Geneva =

The Council of State of Geneva (French: Conseil d'État de Genève) is the executive organ of the Canton of Geneva, in Switzerland. Geneva has a seven-member Conseil d'État.

== History ==
Prior to Geneva joining the Swiss Confederation, the main executive within the Republic of Geneva was the Little Council, made of four syndics, sixteen Twelve Syndics, four lieutenants and five treasurers. Following inspiration from James Fazy, the Council of State of Geneva was created in 1874 and it provided that the members of the Council of State would be directly elected by the people instead of appointed by Parliament, the first of its kind in continental Europe. The council has the right to table legislation.

All decisions taken by the Grand Council of Geneva must be approved by the Council of State of Geneva. They also have authority over all the rules of procedure of the municipal councils of the Canton of Geneva. Members of the Council of State are prohibited from being members of municipal councils or the general council, unless they are teachers. Unlike in most Swiss cantons, the government is not elected using a list of individual candidates, but on a single ballot with boxes to tick. This system, introduced in 2013, was intended reduce the impact of electoral alliances and was designed to encourage voters to vote for seven separate candidates instead of just the candidates on their preferred list. Councillors elected serve a five year term.

The President of the Council of State is appointed from within the membership of its own seven members. However, they are only able to serve one year terms as president which are not renewable and nor are outgoing presidents eligible to be appointed as vice-president the following year. The Council nominates a Chancellor for the term. The Chancellor for the 2023-2028 legislature is Michèle Righetti-El Zayadi.

== Members ==
Name	Party	Office	Elected	Notes
Delphine Bachmann	The Center	Economy, Employment and Energy	2023	
Nicolas Walder	Green Party	Territory	2025	
Carole-Anne Kast	Socialist Party	Institutions and Digital	2023	
Pierre Maudet	Freedom and Social Justice	Health and Mobility	2023	
Anne Hiltpold	Liberal Radical Party	Education, Training and Youth	2023	Vice President
Nathalie Fontanet	Liberal Radical Party	Human Resources and External Relations	2023	
Thierry Apothéloz	Socialist Party	Social cohesion	2023	President

== See also ==
- Grand Council of Geneva
