= Timeline of Geneva =

The following is a timeline of the history of the municipality of Geneva, Switzerland.

== Prehistory ==
Year	Date	Event
c. 18'000 BC		Deglaciation is underway in the western Geneva basin, and a large periglacial lake occupies the western part of the basin in front of the Rhône glacier.
c. 16'000 BC		The front of the Rhône glacier stands at the site of modern Geneva and deposits the sediments that later form the hill of the old town.
c. 13'400–12'900 BC		Magdalenian reindeer hunters occupy the rock shelters of Veyrier, one of the oldest known prehistoric sites in the region.
c. 5000 BC		Farming communities begin clearing large areas for cultivation.
c. 3000–2900 BC		The first occupation of the hill of Choully at Satigny/Crédery dates to the beginning of the Late Neolithic.
c. 2450–2050 BC		A final prehistoric occupation phase at Crédery is associated with the Bell Beaker culture.
c. 650–450 BC		Remains from the Hallstatt D culture are attested at Vandœuvres.
c.120 BC		The Allobrogians establish a large sanctuary.

== Antiquity ==
Year	Date	Event
121 BC		The Allobrogian fortified settlement is conquered by the Roman Republic.
c.80 BC		The port is rebuilt.
c.75 BC		A monumental wooden statue is erected by the port.
58 BC		Caesar arrives in Geneva and orders the bridge across the Rhône to be destroyed. A 28 km fortification is built to block the Helvetii.
31 BC		Geneva is placed under the colony of Vienne.
14 BC		A defensive wall is built at Carouge.
c.AD 50		Fire.
AD 150		Fire.
AD 277		Alemannic invasion devastates the town.
AD 280		The city is promoted to the rank of civitas.
AD 285		A new city wall is built.
c.AD 350		The first Christian sanctuary is established.
AD 380		A large cathedral complex is completed.
AD 400		The Diocese of Geneva is established.
AD 443		Geneva becomes capital of the Kingdom of the Burgundians.

== Middle Ages ==
Year	Date	Event
c.AD 500		War between Godegisel of Geneva and his brother Gundobad of Lyon.
AD 506		Sigismund is made co-king at Carouge.
AD 515		St. Peter's Cathedral is rebuilt by King Sigismund after the Burgundian Civil War.
AD 516		Sigismund is crowned king of the Burgundians at Carouge.
AD 534		The Franks conquer the city.
AD 563		A tsunami on Lake Geneva devastates the city.
AD 773		Emperor Charlemagne holds a council of war at St. Peter's Cathedral.
AD 843	10 August	Geneva becomes part of Middle Francia under the Treaty of Verdun.
AD 880	February	Geneva becomes part of East Francia under the Treaty of Ribemont.
c.AD 882		The people and clergy are granted the right to elect their bishop.
AD 888		Geneva becomes part of the second Kingdom of Burgundy.
c.AD 1000		The bishop entrusts the priory of Saint-Victor to Cluny.
c.1020 AD		The right of coinage is granted.
1032 AD	6 September	Geneva passes to Conrad II, Holy Roman Emperor, after the death of Rudolph of Burgundy.
1034 AD	1 August	Conrad II is crowned King of Burgundy in St. Peter's Cathedral.
1124 AD		The Treaty of Seyssel confirms the bishop's sovereignty over Geneva.
1154 AD		Emperor Frederick Barbarossa grants the bishop imperial immediacy.
1158 AD		Construction of the present St. Peter's Cathedral begins under Arducius de Faucigny.
1162 AD		Emperor Frederick Barbarossa confirms the bishops' independence and raises them to the rank of imperial princes.
1162 AD		The count of Geneva is ordered to restore church possessions to the bishop.
1215 AD		Bishop Aymon de Grandson builds the Château de l'Île.
1237 AD	13 May	The count of Savoy obtains a ruinous fine against the count of Geneva.
c.1260 AD		The Geneva fairs begin to flourish.
1263 AD		Dominicans arrive.
1266 AD		Franciscans arrive.
1285 AD	29 September	First "Commune of Geneva" annulled by the bishop.
1287 AD		Amadeus V of Savoy captures the Château de l'Île.
1288 AD		St. Peter's Cathedral is completed.
1291 AD	August	The cathedral is bombarded by the count of Geneva and the Dauphin of Viennois.
1291 AD		A new communal revolution breaks out.
1291 AD		Amadeus V of Savoy besieges and takes the counts castle.
1309 AD		The bishop recognises the citizens' right to elect syndics.
c.1310 AD		A new market hall is built at the Molard.
1321 AD		Fire.
1333 AD		Fire.
1364 AD		Syndics begin judging criminal cases.
1375 AD		Construction of a new city wall begins.
1387 AD	23 May	The town charter is granted, giving the right to elect four syndics.
1407 AD		Population: 4,000.
c.1415 AD		Geneva becomes Europe's leading financial centre.
1420 AD		Around 13 Jewish families are confined to a ghetto, the only one in present-day Switzerland.
1430 AD		Fire.
1434 AD	9 March	Antipope Felix V, the former Duke of Savoy, appoints himself bishop of Geneva.
1445 AD		The city's franchises are extended to the banks of the Arve.
1462 AD		Louis XI favours the Lyon fairs, ending Geneva's economic boom.
1475 AD		Geneva is fined by the Swiss after the Burgundian Wars.
1476 AD		Poor Clares settle at the Bourg-de-Four.
1477 AD	14 November	An alliance is formed with Bern and Fribourg.
1478 AD		The first local printing press is in operation.
c.1480 AD		Augustinian hermits settle near the Arve bridge.
1490 AD		The city council orders the expulsion of the Jews.

== Early modern period ==
Year	Date	Event
1519 AD		Geneva allies with Fribourg.
1524 AD		"The Genevese shake off the yoke of Savoy."
1526 AD	25 February	Geneva allies with Bern and Fribourg.
1529 AD	24 March	Attack by the Confrérie de la Cuiller fails (Nuit des échelles).
1530 AD		Geneva becomes self-governing internally.
1530 AD	10 October	Genevan troops defeat the Cuiller alliance at Meyrin.
1533 AD	22 August	Bishop Pierre de La Baume leaves Geneva.
1535 AD	10 August	The Mass is banned.
1535 AD	10 October	A relief force from Neuchâtel defeats the Savoyards at Gingins.
1535 AD	26 November	The Council of Two Hundred assumes the right to mint coins.
1535 AD	29 November	Hôpital général founded.
1536 AD	21 May	The General Council adopts the Reformation and compulsory schooling.
1536 AD		Protestant leader John Calvin active in Geneva.
1536 AD		Area of city expanded.
1541 AD		The Republic of Geneva and Genevan Consistory established.
1541 AD	20 November	Ecclesiastical Ordinances adopted.
1545 AD	2 June	Divorce granted.
1553 AD	27 October	Michael Servetus executed for heresy.
1559 AD		Collège de Genève founded.
1560 AD		English-language Geneva Bible published.
1580 AD		Population: 17,330.
1582 AD		A Savoyard siege of Geneva fails.
1584 AD		The alliance with Bern is extended to Zurich.
1589 AD	April	Heavy fighting at Carouge, during war with savoy.
1590 AD		Genevan troops take the fort of Versoix.
1602 AD	12 December	Savoy fails to conquer Geneva, an event celebrated as the "Escalade".
1603 AD	Spring	Geneva launches a campaign against Savoy.
1603 AD	July	The Treaty of Saint-Julien implicitly recognises Geneva's independence.
1679 AD		French embassy established.
1690 AD		Population: 16,220.
1712 AD	28 June	Jean-Jacques Rousseau born.
1715 AD		Temple Neuf inaugurated.
1736 AD		Société des catéchumènes founded.
1738 AD		"The republic adopts a regular constitution."
1749 AD	15 August	Territorial exchange with France (Treaty of Paris).
1754 AD	30 May	Territorial exchange with the Kingdom of Sardinia (Treaty of Turin).
1755 AD		Vacheron Constantin founded.
1766 AD		Théâtre de Rosimond built.
1770 AD		"Insurrection suppressed."
c.1780 AD		Jacob Schweppe begins producing carbonated water.
1782 AD	2 July	Geneva sieged by French, Sardinian and Bernese troops.
1782 AD	21 November	Geneva Revolution of 1782 reversed by an edict of pacification.
1783 AD		Théâtre de Neuve built.

== Late modern period ==
Year	Date	Event
1789 AD		Trade show held.
1791 AD	2 March	The decrees against Rousseau are declared of no effect.
1792 AD	December	Revolution ends the Ancien Régime.
1794 AD	5 February	New constitution introduces direct democracy.
1794 AD	July	"Government overthrown;" "executions, etc."
1798 AD	15 April	French troops occupy Geneva.
1798 AD	April	Geneva becomes capital of the Léman (department) of the French First Republic (later the First French Empire).
1798 AD		Population: 24,331.
1813 AD	31 December	Restoration of the Republic.
1814 AD	1 March	French counter-offensive repulsed by Austrian troops at the Battle of Saint-Julien.
1814 AD	1 June	Swiss troops land at Port-Noir.
1815 AD		Canton of Geneva created.
1815 AD		Canton of Geneva becomes part of the Swiss Confederation.
1816 AD		The Treaty of Turin nearly doubles the size of the Canton of Geneva.
1817 AD		Botanical garden created in the Parc des Bastions.
1821 AD		Catholic diocese of Lausanne and Geneva established.
1821 AD		Philhellenic committee founded in support of Greek independence.
1825 AD		Prison begins operating.
1826 AD		Musée Rath built.
1828 AD		Société genevoise d'utilité publique (public welfare society) founded.
1829 AD		Töpffer's Adventures of Dr. Festus comic book created.
1832 AD		Pont des Bergues built.
1834 AD	5 February	Polish-Sardinian unrest.
1834 AD		Population: 27,177.
1835 AD		Conservatoire de Musique de Genève founded.
1837 AD		Société d'histoire et d'archéologie de Genève founded.
1841 AD		Jews granted freedom of establishment in the canton of Geneva.
1841 AD	22 November	Revolution; universal male suffrage introduced.
1842 AD		Geneva municipality created.
1845 AD		Gas lighting installed.
1846 AD		Political unrest; "constitution made more democratic."
1847 AD		"Radical party" in power.
1848 AD		Banque de Genève founded.
1850 AD		Fortifications demolished.
1850 AD		Population: 37,724 in city; 64,146 in canton.
1851 AD		Watchmaker Patek Philippe & Co. in business.
1852 AD		Union Chrétienne de Jeunes Gens branch established.
1852 AD		Communauté Israélite de Genève founded.
1852 AD		Construction of Notre-Dame begins.
1853 AD		Anglican church consecrated.
1854 AD		Jardin Anglais (park) laid out.
1856 AD		Quai Gustave-Ador built.
1857 AD		Coulouvrenière bridge built.
1857 AD		Construction of the synagogue begins.
1858 AD		Genève-Cornavin railway station opens.
1858 AD		Ecole Saint-Antoine (school) built.
1860 AD		Population: 82,876 in canton.
1862 AD		Mont-Blanc bridge completed.
1862 AD		Horse-drawn tramway opens.
1863 AD		International Committee of the Red Cross headquartered in Geneva.
1864 AD	August	International "Convention for the Amelioration of the Condition of the Wounded and Sick in Armed Forces in the Field" signed in Geneva, i.e. "the fundamental rules of war."
1864 AD	22–23 August	"Election riots, with loss of life, through the indiscretion of M. Fazy;" city occupied by federal forces.
1864 AD		Monument erected in Port-Noir.
1866 AD		Russian Orthodox church built.
1867 AD	September	Japanese delegation under Tokugawa Akitake visits.
1867 AD	September	International "Congress of Peace" held in Geneva.
1867 AD		Salle de la Réformation inaugurated.
1872 AD	14 September	Alabama Claims arbitration award rendered.
1873 AD	June–July	Iwakura Mission visits.
1873 AD		University of Geneva active.
1873 AD		Christian Catholic Church is formally established.
1879 AD		Grand Théâtre de Genève opens.
1879 AD		Brunswick Monument erected.
1880 AD		Population: 99,712 in canton.
1881 AD		Société Genevoise de Photographie founded.
1883 AD	23 November	Steamboat collision on Lake Geneva.
1886 AD		Geneva Seal adopted.
1886 AD		Jet d'Eau (fountain) installed.
1891 AD		International Peace Bureau headquartered in Geneva.
1891 AD		Lake level permanently regulated.
1892 AD	9 July	Steamboat explosion on Lake Geneva.
1893 AD		Piolet Club (hiking group) formed.
1894 AD		Victoria Hall (concert hall) built.
1896 AD	1 May	Swiss National Exhibition opens in Geneva.
1898 AD	10 September	Empress Elisabeth of Austria assassinated by Luigi Lucheni.
1900 AD		Population: 97,359 in city; 132,609 in canton.
1902 AD	23 December	Cathedral bombing.
1905 AD		Geneva Motor Show begins.
1907 AD		The Genevese vote to separate Church and State.
1910 AD		Museum of Art and History built.
1917 AD		Monument to the Reformation built.
1919 AD		International Labour Organization headquartered in Geneva.
1920 AD		League of Nations headquartered in city.
1920 AD		Alhambra cinema active.
1920 AD	15 November	First Assembly of the League of Nations.
1921 AD		Inter-Parliamentary Union headquartered in Geneva.
1924 AD		International School of Geneva established.
1924 AD	23 December	Phoebus cartel founded.
1925 AD	17 June	Geneva Protocol signed.
1926 AD	26 September	International "Convention to Suppress the Slave Trade and Slavery" signed in Geneva.
1926 AD		Compagnie de 1602 (heritage society) formed.
1929 AD	27 July	International "Convention relative to the Treatment of Prisoners of War" signed.
1930 AD	April	Honsen-ji temple bell returned to Shinagawa.
1930 AD		Population: 124,121 in city; 171,366 in canton.
1931 AD		Les Eaux-Vives, Le Petit-Saconnex and Plainpalais merge with the city.
1932 AD	1 February	International disarmament conference begins.
1932 AD	31 May	Jean Uhler becomes Geneva's 101st mayor.
1932 AD	9 November	1932 Geneva unrest
1936 AD	30 June	Haile Selassie addresses the League of Nations.
1936 AD		World Jewish Congress is founded.
1938 AD		Palace of Nations built.
1939 AD		Geneva International Music Competition begins.
1939 AD		Geneva hosts the World Zionist Congress.
1942 AD		Start of Trolleybuses in Geneva.
1943 AD	8 June	Jules Peney becomes Geneva's 112th mayor.

== Contemporary era ==
Year	Date	Event
1946 AD	8–18 April	Final Assembly dissolves the League of Nations.
1946 AD		UN European headquarters established.
1947 AD		United Nations Economic Commission for Europe headquartered in Geneva.
1948 AD		World Health Organization and World Council of Churches headquartered in Geneva.
1949 AD	12 August	International "Convention relative to the Protection of Civilian Persons in Time of War" signed in Geneva.
1950 AD		United Nations High Commissioner for Refugees headquartered in Geneva.
1950 AD		Population: 202,918 in canton.
1954 AD		International conference on Korea and Indochina held in Geneva.
1954 AD		European Organization for Nuclear Research (CERN) headquartered in nearby Meyrin.
1955 AD		L'horloge fleurie flowerbed created in the Jardin Anglais.
1955 AD	18 July	Geneva Summit of the "Big Four" is held.
1957 AD		Electric toothbrush invented.
1960 AD		Women's suffrage introduced in the canton.
1961 AD		Centre islamique de Genève founded.
1963 AD		United Nations Institute for Training and Research headquartered in Geneva.
1964 AD		United Nations Conference on Trade and Development headquartered in Geneva.
1969 AD	10 June	Pope Paul VI visits.
1970 AD		Population: 173,618 in city; 331,599 in canton.
1971 AD	10 October	Emperor Hirohito visits the ICRC.
1972 AD		Tour du Lac rowing contest begins.
1977 AD	9 May	US President Jimmy Carter meets Syrian President Hafez al-Assad.
1977 AD		Geneva Symphony Orchestra established.
1978 AD		Geneva Mosque built.
1980 AD	30 April	Queen Elizabeth II visits the ICRC.
1982 AD	15 June	Pope John Paul II visits.
1984 AD	1 June	Roger Dafflon becomes Geneva's 153rd mayor.
1984 AD	12 June	John Paul II visits the World Council of Churches.
1985 AD	1 June	René Emmenegger becomes Geneva's 154th mayor.
1985 AD	19 November	Ronald Reagan and Mikhail Gorbachev meet for the first time at Fleur d'Eau.
1985 AD	21 November	Geneva Summit concludes.
1986 AD		Geneva City Archives established.
1986 AD	1 June	Claude Ketterer becomes Geneva's 155th mayor.
1987 AD		Geneva Airport railway station opens.
1987 AD	1 June	Claude Haegi becomes Geneva's 156th mayor.
1988 AD		Intergovernmental Panel on Climate Change is set up by the World Meteorological Organisation and United Nations Environment Programme.
1988 AD	1 June	Guy-Olivier Segond becomes Geneva's 157th mayor.
1988 AD	29 October	International Red Cross and Red Crescent Museum opens.
1989 AD	12 March	World Wide Web concept invented by Berners-Lee of CERN.
1989 AD	1 June	René Emmenegger becomes Geneva's 158th mayor.
1990 AD	1 June	André Hédiger becomes Geneva's 159th mayor.
1990 AD	23 November	US President George H. W. Bush meets Assad.
1991 AD	1 June	Jacqueline Burnand becomes Geneva's 160th mayor.
1991 AD	9 September	Friendship charter with Shinagawa signed.
1992 AD	1 June	Madeleine Rossi becomes Geneva's 161st mayor.
1993 AD	1 June	Michel Rossetti becomes Geneva's 162nd mayor.
1993 AD	20 December	UN General Assembly establishes the position of the High Commissioner for Human Rights.
1994 AD	15–16 January	US President Bill Clinton meets Assad.
1994 AD	1 June	André Hédiger becomes Geneva's 163rd mayor.
1995 AD	1 January	World Trade Organization (WTO) establishes its headquarters in Geneva.
1995 AD	1 June	Alain Vaissade becomes Geneva's 164th mayor.
1996 AD	1 June	Jacqueline Burnand becomes Geneva's 165th mayor.
1997 AD		Sculpture "Broken Chair" installed in the Place des Nations.
1997 AD	1 June	Michel Rossetti becomes Geneva's 166th mayor.
1998 AD	18 May	Clinton attends the 50th anniversary of the GATT.
1998 AD	1 June	André Hédiger becomes Geneva's 167th mayor.
1999 AD	4 May	New building of the World Meteorological Organization (WMO) inaugurated.
1999 AD	1 June	Pierre Muller becomes Geneva's 168th mayor.
1999 AD	16 June	Clinton addresses the International Labour Conference.
2000 AD		Population: 177,964 in city; 413,673 in canton.
2000 AD	25–26 March	Clinton meets Assad.
2000 AD	May	Emperor Akihito visits.
2000 AD	1 June	Alain Vaissade becomes Geneva's 169th mayor.
2001 AD	1 June	Manuel Tornare becomes Geneva's 170th mayor.
2002 AD		City website online (approximate date).
2002 AD	1 June	André Hédiger becomes Geneva's 171st mayor.
2003 AD	1 June	Christian Ferrazino becomes Geneva's 172nd mayor.
2004 AD		Genève-Sécheron railway station opens.
2004 AD	1 June	Pierre Muller becomes Geneva's 173rd mayor.
2005 AD		Geneva Citizens' Movement established.
2005 AD	1 June	Manuel Tornare becomes Geneva's 174th mayor.
2006 AD	1 June	André Hédiger becomes Geneva's 175th mayor.
2007 AD	1 June	Patrice Mugny becomes Geneva's 176th mayor.
2007 AD	23 July	Rhino squat is evicted.
2008 AD	1 June	Manuel Tornare becomes Geneva's 177th mayor.
2008 AD	10 September	CERN launches the Large Hadron Collider (LHC).
2009 AD	1 June	Rémy Pagani becomes Geneva's 178th mayor.
2009 AD	10 July	Calvin Jubilee held.
2009 AD	November–December	World Trade Organisation Ministerial Conference of 2009 held in Geneva.
2009 AD	November	Anti-WTO protest.
2010 AD	1 June	Sandrine Salerno becomes Geneva's 179th mayor.
2011 AD	1 June	Pierre Maudet becomes Geneva's 180th mayor.
2012 AD	1 June	Rémy Pagani becomes Geneva's 181st mayor.
2013 AD		Revised constitution of the Canton of Geneva effected; created by the Assemblée constituante de Genève.
2013 AD	1 June	Sandrine Salerno becomes Geneva's 182nd mayor.
2013 AD	24 November	Geneva interim agreement with Iran signed.
2013 AD		Population: 469,433 in canton.
2014 AD		Nuclear bunkers converted to homeless shelters.
2014 AD	1 June	Sami Kanaan becomes Geneva's 183rd mayor.
2015 AD	1 June	Esther Alder becomes Geneva's 184th mayor.
2015 AD	August	Intern-in-tent reported.
2016 AD	1 June	Guillaume Barazzone becomes Geneva's 185th mayor.
2017 AD	1 June	Rémy Pagani becomes Geneva's 186th mayor.
2018 AD	1 June	Sami Kanaan becomes Geneva's 187th mayor.
2018 AD	21 June	Pope Francis visits.
2019 AD		Opening of the CEVA rail line to Annemasse in France, operated by the Léman Express train service.
2019 AD	1 June	Sandrine Salerno becomes Geneva's 188th mayor.
2020 AD	1 June	Sami Kanaan becomes Geneva's 189th mayor.
2021 AD	1 June	Frédérique Perler becomes Geneva's 190th mayor.
2021 AD	16 June	Biden–Putin summit.
2022 AD	1 June	Marie Barbey-Chappuis becomes Geneva's 191st mayor.
2023 AD	1 June	Alfonso Gomez becomes Geneva's 192nd mayor.
2024 AD	1 June	Christina Kitsos becomes Geneva's 193rd mayor.
2025 AD	1 June	Alfonso Gomez becomes Geneva's 194th mayor.

== See also ==
- History of Geneva
- List of cultural property of national significance in Switzerland: Geneva
- Timelines of other municipalities in Switzerland: Basel, Bern, Zürich

== Bibliography ==
=== in English ===
Published in the 17th–19th century

- Jacob Spon (1687). History of the City and State of Geneva. London: Bernard White. (translated from French)
- George Keate (1761). Short Account of the Ancient History, Present Government, and Laws of the Republic of Geneva. London: R. and J. Dodsley.
- Frederic Leopold Stolberg (1796), "(Geneva)", Travels through Germany, Switzerland, Italy, and Sicily, Translated by Thomas Holcroft, London: G.G. and J. Robinson
- "Geneva". A Geographical, Historical and Political Description of the Empire of Germany, Holland, the Netherlands, Switzerland, Prussia, Italy, Sicily, Corsica and Sardinia: With a Gazetteer. London: John Stockdale. 1800. OCLC 79519893.
- Abraham Rees (1819), "Geneva", The Cyclopaedia, London: Longman, Hurst, Rees, Orme & Brown, hdl:2027/uc2.ark:/13960/t9571pn88
- William Henry Overall, ed. (1870). "Geneva". Dictionary of Chronology. London: William Tegg. hdl:2027/uc2.ark:/13960/t9m32q949.
- George Henry Townsend (1877), "Geneva", A Manual of Dates (5th ed.), London: Frederick Warne & Co., hdl:2027/hvd.32044088047865
- Norddeutscher Lloyd (1896), "Geneva", Guide through Germany, Austria-Hungary, Italy, Switzerland, France, Belgium, Holland and England, Berlin: J. Reichmann & Cantor, OCLC 8395555

Published in the 20th century

- "Geneva". Chambers's Encyclopaedia. Vol. 5. London. 1901. hdl:2027/uc2.ark:/13960/t1fj2r624.
- "Geneva", Handbook for Switzerland, Murray's Handbooks for Travellers (19th ed.), London: Edward Stanford, 1904, hdl:2027/hvd.hn1sv5
- Coolidge, William Augustus Brevoort (1910). "Geneva" . Encyclopædia Britannica. Vol. 11 (11th ed.). pp. 824–825.
- Benjamin Vincent (1910), "Geneva", Haydn's Dictionary of Dates (25th ed.), London: Ward, Lock & Co., hdl:2027/loc.ark:/13960/t89g6g776 – via HathiTrust
- "Geneva". Switzerland. Grieben's Guide Books (2nd ed.). Berlin: Albert Goldschmidt. 1912. hdl:2027/uc1.$b264107.
- "Millennial City: The Romance of Geneva, Capital of the League of Nations", National Geographic Magazine, vol. 35, Washington DC, pp. 116 v, 1919, hdl:2027/mdp.39015039320059
- "Geneva", Switzerland (26th ed.), Leipzig: Karl Baedeker, 1922, OCLC 4248970 – via Internet Archive
- Nicolas Bouvier (1994). "Geneva". Geneva, Zurich, Basel: History, Culture, and National Identity. Princeton University Press. pp. 17–40. ISBN 978-1-4008-6369-3.
- Trudy Ring, ed. (1995). "Geneva". Northern Europe. International Dictionary of Historic Places. Fitzroy Dearborn. ISBN 978-1-136-63944-9.
- Antoine S. Bailly (2000). "Geneva: does wealth ensure social stability?". In Mario Polèse; Richard E. Stren (eds.). The Social Sustainability of Cities: Diversity and the Management of Change. University of Toronto Press. ISBN 978-0-8020-8320-3.

Published in the 21st century

- Mario Carpo (2001). "Geneva". Architecture in the Age of Printing. MIT Press. pp. 79–102. ISBN 978-0-262-03288-9.
- Hugo Slim (2007). "Geneva's Future: Reflections on the Role of a Values-Based City". International Affairs. 83 (1): 109–125. doi:10.1111/j.1468-2346.2007.00605.x. JSTOR 4122042. S2CID 143958854.
- Christopher Kennedy; et al. (2009). "Greenhouse Gas Emissions from Global Cities". Environmental Science & Technology. 43 (19): 7297–7302. Bibcode:2009EnST...43.7297K. doi:10.1021/es900213p. PMID 19848137.

=== in French ===
- Luc Weibel (2006). "Chronologie". Croire à Genève: la Salle de la Réformation (XIXe-XXe siècle) [Belief in Geneva] (in French). Geneva: Labor et Fides. p. 201+. ISBN 978-2-8309-1193-0.
