= List of mayors of Geneva =

This is a list of mayors of Geneva, Switzerland. The office of mayor of Geneva (maire de Genève) rotates annually among the five members of the Conseil administratif, the executive government of the city. The new mayor takes office in June.

Between 1842 and 1954, the title of the person presiding the executive of the City of Geneva was Président du Conseil administratif; since 1954, the title Maire (mayor) is used.

Numbers in brackets after names indicate the ordinal of the term, e.g. (2) indicates that individual's second term as mayor.

Mayors of Geneva
Year	Mayor	Birth	Death	Party	Years on the Conseil administratif
1967	Jean-Paul Buensod (1)	1923	1988	Christian Democratic People's Party	1967–1975
1968	Lise Girardin (1)	1921	2010	Free Democratic Party	1967–1979
1969	Claude Ketterer (1)	1927	1994	Social Democratic Party	1966–1987
1970	Pierre Marcel Raisin (1)	1922	1996	Liberal Party	1967–1983
1971	Jean-Paul Buensod (2)	1923	1988	Christian Democratic People's Party	1967–1975
1972	Lise Girardin (2)	1921	2010	Free Democratic Party	1967–1979
1973	Claude Ketterer (2)	1927	1994	Social Democratic Party	1966–1987
1974	Pierre Marcel Raisin (2)	1922	1996	Liberal Party	1967–1983
1975	Lise Girardin (3)	1921	2010	Free Democratic Party	1967–1979
1976	René Emmenegger (1)	1930	2018	Christian Democratic People's Party	1975–1991
1977	Claude Ketterer (3)	1927	1994	Social Democratic Party	1966–1987
1978	Pierre Marcel Raisin (3)	1922	1996	Liberal Party	1967–1983
1979	Roger Dafflon (1)	1914	1996	Swiss Party of Labour	1970–1987
1980	René Emmenegger (2)	1930	2018	Christian Democratic People's Party	1975–1991
1981	Claude Ketterer (4)	1927	1994	Social Democratic Party	1966–1987
1982	Pierre Marcel Raisin (4)	1922	1996	Liberal Party	1967–1983
1983	Guy-Olivier Segond (1)	1945	2020	Free Democratic Party	1979–1989
1984	Roger Dafflon (2)	1914	1996	Swiss Party of Labour	1970–1987
1985	René Emmenegger (3)	1930	2018	Christian Democratic People's Party	1975–1991
1986	Claude Ketterer (5)	1927	1994	Social Democratic Party	1966–1987
1987	Claude Haegi	1940	Living	Liberal Party	1983–1989
1988	Guy-Olivier Segond (2)	1945	2020	Free Democratic Party	1979–1989
1989	René Emmenegger (4)	1930	2018	Christian Democratic People's Party	1975–1991
1990	André Hediger (1)	1941	2024	Swiss Party of Labour	1987–2007
1991	Jacqueline Burnand (1)	1944	Living	Social Democratic Party	1987–1999
1992	Madeleine Rossi	1935	2008	Liberal Party	1990–1995
1993	Michel Rossetti (1)	1937	Living	Free Democratic Party	1990–1999
1994	André Hediger (2)	1941	2024	Swiss Party of Labour	1987–2007
1995	Alain Vaissade (1)	1946	Living	Green Party	1991–2003
1996	Jacqueline Burnand (2)	1944	Living	Social Democratic Party	1987–1999
1997	Michel Rossetti (2)	1937	Living	Free Democratic Party	1990–1999
1998	André Hediger (3)	1941	2024	Swiss Party of Labour	1987–2007
1999	Pierre Muller (1)	1952	2022	Liberal Party	1995–2007
2000	Alain Vaissade (2)	1946	Living	Green Party	1991–2003
2001	Manuel Tornare (1)	1951	Living	Social Democratic Party	1999–
2002	André Hediger (4)	1941	2024	Swiss Party of Labour	1987–2007
2003	Christian Ferrazino	1954	Living	Alliance de gauche	1999–2007
2004	Pierre Muller (2)	1952	2022	Liberal Party	1995–2007
2005	Manuel Tornare (2)	1951	Living	Social Democratic Party	1999–
2006	André Hediger (5)	1941	2024	Swiss Party of Labour	1987–2007
2007	Patrice Mugny	1953	Living	Green Party	2003–
2008	Manuel Tornare (3)	1951	Living	Social Democratic Party	1999–
2009	Rémy Pagani (1)	1954	Living	À gauche toute!	2007–
2010	Sandrine Salerno	1971	Living	Social Democratic Party	
2011	Pierre Maudet	1978	Living	FDP.The Liberals	
2012	Rémy Pagani (2)	1954	Living	À gauche toute!	2007–
2013	Sandrine Salerno (2)	1971	Living	Social Democratic Party	2013–
2014	Sami Kanaan	1964	Living	Social Democratic Party	2007–
2015	Esther Alder	1958	Living	Green Party	2007–
2016	Guillaume Barazzone	1982	Living	Social Democratic Party	2007–
2017	Rémy Pagani (3)	1954	Living	À gauche toute!	
2018	Sami Kanaan (2)	1964	Living	Social Democratic Party	
2019	Sandrine Salerno (3)	1971	Living	Social Democratic Party	
2020	Sami Kanaan (3)	1964	Living	Social Democratic Party	
2021	Frédérique Perler	1960	Living	Green Party	2020–
2022	Marie Barbey-Chappuis	1971	Living	Social Democratic Party	2020–
2023	Alfonso Gomez	1960	Living	Green Party	2013–
2024	Christina Kitsos	1981	Living	Social Democratic Party	2020–
2025	Alfonso Gomez (2)	1960	Living	Green Party	2013–
