= Éric Stauffer =

Swiss politician (born 1964)

Éric Stauffer (born 24 October 1964) is a Swiss politician from Homberg. He chaired the Genevan Citizens Movement from 2008 to 2012.

== Early life and family ==
Stauffer was born to a Genevan father and an Italian mother, and grew up in Homberg, Bern. His first marriage was when he was 21. He married his current wife 17 years later. He has two children. He holds Italian, Mauritian, and Swiss citizenship.

== Professional career ==
Stauffer claimed to have collaborated in the 1990s with the Federal Military Department, in particular the Spiez Laboratory, which specializes in the study of atomic, biological and chemical threats and risks related to weapons of mass destruction . Contacted by the newspaper Tribune de Genève as part of an investigation, the laboratory and the Federal Office of Police refuse to comment on this statement, neither confirming nor contradicting the statements of Stauffer, in this case. The newspaper Le Temps also contacted the Swiss Confederation, quoting from the article and editorialising "[W]e must insist that he [Stauffer] provide information on his activities in the years 1992 to 1994" after Stauffer claimed "I collaborated with the Federal Military Department, I was active in everything related to weapons of mass destruction".

Around 2000, Stauffer was active on the island of Mauritius, advising his friend, Xavier-Luc Duval, Minister of Industry and Commerce. He leaves the island after being accused of serious charges by Prime Minister Navin Ramgoolam. When Stauffer left, he denounced Ramgoolam.

In October 2003, he participated in the creation of the airline Helvetic Wings and became the chief financial officer, in disagreement with the shareholders of the company on the strategy of development he resigned in April 2004 after only 6 months of activity. In March 2006, Helvetic Wings went bankrupt.

In 2010, Stauffer founded with Carlos Medeiros a company active in the field of mobile telephony. Affiliated with the operator Sunrise, the company offered discounted offers to its customers. In January 2018, Sunrise acquired the company's business and the Medinex brand. At the end of 2018, Stauffer created a new telephone services company based in Valais.

== Political career ==
=== Partian Path ===
Member of the Swiss Liberal Party in the 1980s, he was first elected as City Councilor of the city of Onex (Geneve) during the legislature 1987–1991. Subsequently, he joined the Democratic Union of the Center in the spring of 2005. A few weeks later, he founded, with Georges Letellier, on 6 June 2005, the Blochérien Genevois Movement (MBG), which quickly changed its name by adopting the Mouvement des citoyens genevois (MCG), which becomes well known due to broadcasts of the RTS (Radio Television Switzerland) Infrared. Stauffer was invited to run against Joseph Deiss as Federal Councillor.

In October 2005, the CWM reached a quorum of 7% and won 9 deputies. Stauffer was elected Deputy to the Grand Council of the Republic and Canton of Geneva under the label of the Mouvement Citizens Genevois. Stauffer was elected on 20 February 2008, by the General Assembly of the CWM as president. Roger Golay replaced him on 28 April 2012. In 2016, he sought the presidency of the movement against Ana Roch but lost and announced his withdrawal from politics.

In 2017, Stauffer launches the "Geneva on the move" (GEM) movement with a view to the cantonal elections of 2018, Following his non-reelection to the Geneva Grand Council, Stauffer announced the dissolution of his "Geneva on the Move" movement and its withdrawal from political life. In 2018, he moved to Valais.

=== Commune of Onex ===
Councillor of the municipality of Onex, during the municipal elections of 29 April 2007, and for the first time in the political history of Geneva, Stauffer's candidacy for the Administrative Council in Onex, causes a second round where he is finally defeated by the Christian Democrat candidate Philippe Rochat. On 17 April 2011, he was elected to the Onex Administrative Council by ousting Rochat. He was mayor of the commune for the years 2013–14. On 19 April 2015, during the first round of the municipal elections, he was only in fourth position in the election of the Administrative Council, behind the PLR candidate François Mumenthaler. In the second round, an unprecedented alliance between the PLR-Radical Liberal Party and the Socialist Party with the Greens and the PDC, which make a joint list against Stauffer who runs alone, achieves almost 38% of the vote. On 10 May, Stauffer lost his seat.

=== Grand Council of Geneva ===
Stauffer presented his candidacy for the election of the Grand Council of the Canton of Geneva in October 2005. Elected deputy, he unsuccessfully contests, on 13 November, a seat in the Council of State but ahead of the two candidates of the Democratic Union of the center of several thousand votes. On 11 October 2009, he was re-elected by leading the list of his party, which doubles his representation to become the third party of the canton. In the process, he launched his candidacy for the Council of State alongside Mauro Poggia but both men lose.

In October 2010, Stauffer designed a poster as part of a federal vote picturing Colonel Gaddafi with the slogan "He wants to destroy Switzerland." Libya lodged a complaint with the Swiss Confederation against Stauffer. The case generated a lot of attention in the Swiss media.

Stauffer was the subject of a federal criminal procedure for "contempt of foreign Head of State". The Federal Council gives permission to prosecute Stauffer. At first, the Public Ministry of the Swiss Confederation pronounces a sequestration of the posters. Some eight months after the start of the lawsuit against Stauffer, the Arab Spring will cause the dismissal of the regime of Gaddafi who will be placed under international arrest warrant to be tried before the International Criminal Tribunal for the Hague, Kadhafi will be assassinated, the Public Ministry of Confederation will abandon the lawsuits against Stauffer. Stauffer was victorious at the Federal Court on this case.

In 2011, Stauffer, as president of the MCG, achieves a breakthrough from three municipalities with elected representatives to 16 municipalities and propels the GCM to the rank of 2nd cantonal party just behind the PLR.

On 29 February 2012, he was nominated by the GCM for the complementary election to the Council of State, to replace State Councilor Mark Muller, who resigned. Stauffer is again candidate in 2013, presented by his party with Delphine Perrella-Gabus and Mauro Poggia. On 6 October, he was re-elected to the Grand Council. The same day, he must abandon his ambitions to access the cantonal government. Indeed, he obtains 5 579 votes less than Poggia, who remains the only candidate in the running for the MCG. In 2016, after his failure to take over the chairmanship of the CWM, Stauffer announced his resignation from the Grand Council but reconsidered this decision and sits from June 2016 as "independent". In September 2017, he announced the creation of the new party "Geneva en marche". However, in the elections to the Grand Council, held on 15 April 2018, "Geneva en marche" received only 4.1% of the vote and won no seats.

== Controversies ==
=== Mauritian Affair ===
In 1999, Stauffer founded, in Mauritius with Xavier Luc Duval, a management company Equinoxe Financial Services Ltd. A few months later in a by-election helped by Stauffer, Duval is elected and becomes Minister of Industry and Trade and Deputy Prime Minister of Mauritius. Stauffer was appointed Special Advisor to the Duval, Minister of Industry and Trade.

Then-Prime Minister Navin Ramgoolam was reportedly afraid Stauffer knew money had been diverted from the Mauritian government to the Geneva-based UOB bank in Geneva. An internal UEB document, published by the Geneva Tribune, confirmed that contact took place in 1997 between the bank and the Mauritian finance minister at the time. After a fierce press release from the Swiss Confederation disavowing Ramgolam, the opposition seizes power at an early election. Stauffer was invited to Mauritius and granted Mauritian nationality.

=== Charges against industrial services ===
In 2007, he fought what he claimed was the "productivist logic of the incineration furnace of the Cheneviers factory in Geneva" in the name of public health, finding it absurd to have waste all over Europe to feed Geneva oversized incinerators. Stauffer organizes a press conference in Naples to denounce the import of Neapolitan waste in Geneva and worries about questionable channels between the Italian mafia and the (SIG) in the passage it provokes the Italian government affirming that some members are on the payroll of Mafia sources. The Italian government denied it, "[w]e have never authorized the export of our waste to Geneva or Switzerland." The following day, the Geneva State Council announced a ban on the import of waste. That same year, Stauffer protested against the GIS remuneration system by tabling a parliamentary motion. In 2008, he denounces, on the basis of a report by Claude Marcet, former CFO of GIS and member of the Board of Directors of SIG, that Gaznat, a subsidiary of GIS specializing in gas, allegedly falsified its accounts in the 1990s to conceal dumping of its tariffs and "sink mazoutiers"; the operation would have made it necessary to clean up Gaznat up to 74 million francs payable by the taxpayer of Geneva. Stauffer also denounced payment by the SGI of funds to Energy West Switzerland for financing, through EOS Energie Ouest Switzerland in which the SGI are shareholders, of the Grande Dixence dam, Val d'Hérémence, Valais, in the amount of 30 million francs annually.

In early March 2009, the Council of State revoked Stauffer's mandate as administrator of the SGI for alleged violations of the duties related to its function. The latter rejects its request for suspensive effect by 19 May 2009. The Federal Court confirms the decision of the Administrative Court by judgment of 3 August 2009, considering in particular that his dismissal cannot cause him irreparable harm, a necessary condition for his appeal to be admissible. Stauffer denounced what he described as a "political cabal".

== Legal issues ==
In 2013, Stauffer staged a production filmed to show that young people can very easily buy drugs in Geneva. He has cocaine bought during a political communication operation to demonstrate the ease of buying drugs in the Pâquis neighborhood and the lack of control by the authorities. After the filmed purchase scene, Stauffer shows police the images of the dealers. One was arrested and sentenced. The Attorney General charged Stauffer with being a "drug dealer" and was convicted in 2015. Stauffer appealed against this conviction and won at the court of appeal and was acquitted. The Attorney General appeals the decision to the Federal Court (TF) which confirmed the acquittal of Stauffer on 9 May 2018.

== Awards ==
In 2015, Stauffer received the "Genferei Prize" awarded by the political journalists of Geneva.
