= Jakob Karl Fischer =

Swiss politician (1868–1927)

Karl Fischer

Member of the Grand Council of Aargau
- In office 1 January 1909 – 10 April 1925
- Constituency: Kulm District

Personal details
- Born: Jakob Karl Fischer; 1868 Aarau, Switzerland
- Died: 6 September 1927 (aged 58–59) Menziken, Switzerland
- Spouse: Gotthilde Alma Vogt (m. 1893)
- Relations: Bertrand Vogt (brother-in-law)
- Children: 3
- Occupation: Industrialist, politician

Jakob Karl Fischer colloquially Karl Fischer (1868 – 6 September 1927) was a Swiss industrialist and politician who was the majority owner and president of Fischer Reinach and served on the Grand Council of Aargau for the Free Radical Liberals from 1909 to 1925.

== Early life and career ==
Fischer was born in 1868 in Aarau, Switzerland, to Jakob Fischer (1837–1886), a wine merchant, and Marie Fischer (née Wirz; 1841–1910). His maternal grandfather was Johannes Wirz (1813–1889), who was the founder of the rivet factory, which would later become Wirz & Fischer (presently Fischer Reinach).

His father left the family when he was very young and the parents were divorced in 1870. His father ultimately fled to the United States where he died in Boston, Massachusetts in 1886. After a commercial apprenticeship, Fischer entered the family business which he would later inherit. He would later also be a board member of the Bank in Menziken.

== Politics ==
Fischer served on the Grand Council of Aargau between 1909 and 1925.

== Personal life ==
In 1893, Fischer married Gotthilde Alma Vogt (1864–1938), a daughter of Melchior Vogt (1811–1893), cotton manufacturer, and Elisabeth Vogt (née Heiz; 1830–1910). Her father was among the founders of the largest local bank, Bank in Menziken (which later became part of Valiant Bank), as well as a city council and lieutenant. They had three children;

- Marguerite Fischer (1894–1978), never married
- Johann Jakob "Karl" Fischer (1896–1966), married Emma Nebel (1905–1995), two sons.
- Wilhelm Erich "Willy" Fischer (1904–1981), married Margrit Elisabeth Sulzer, of the Sulzer family, four children.

Fischer died on 6 September 1927 aged 59.
