= Hediger =

Hediger is a surname primarily found in Switzerland. Notable people with the surname include:

- André Hediger (1941–2024), Swiss politician
- Dennis Hediger (born 1986), Swiss footballer
- Heini Hediger (1908–1992), Swiss biologist
- Helmut Hediger (born 1945), Austrian sprint canoeist
- Jovian Hediger (born 1990), Swiss cross-country skier
- Markus Hediger (born 1959), Swiss writer and translator
- Sophie Hediger (1998–2024), Swiss snowboarder

== See also ==
- Hediger Sons, former Swiss tobacco manufacturer
