= Bertrand Vogt =

Swiss industrialist and politician

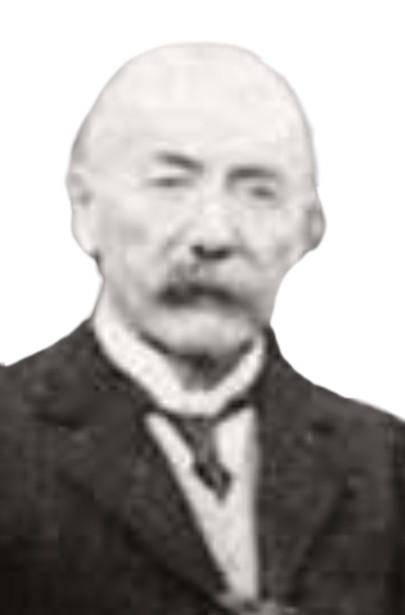
- Vogt in 1917

Member of the Grand Council of Aargau
- In office 10 April 1909 – 1 January 1917
- Constituency: Kulm District

Personal details
- Born: Bertrand Othmar Vogt; 1857 Menziken, Switzerland
- Died: 24 September 1936 (aged 78–79) Reinach, Switzerland
- Party: Free Radical Liberals
- Spouse: Emilie Hediger
- Occupation: President of Hediger Sons

Military service
- Allegiance: Switzerland
- Branch/service: Swiss Armed Forces
- Years of service: 1875–1907
- Rank: Lieutenant General

Bertrand Othmar Vogt colloquially B.O. Vogt (German: [bɛrˈtrænd vɔt]; 1857 - 23 September 1936) was a Swiss industrialist, philanthropist and politician who served on the Grand Council of Aargau from 1909 to 1917 for the Free Democratic Party.

== Early life and education ==
Vogt was born 1857 in Menziken, Switzerland, the second of six children, to Melchior Vogt (1811–1893), a cotton manufacturer in the putting-out system, and Elisabeth Vogt (née Heiz; 1830–1910), into an affluent Protestant family. One of his sisters, Gotthilde Fischer (née Vogt; 1864–1938), married into the Fischer family.

His paternal and maternal family belonged among the well established bourgeoisie in Menziken. His father was a cotton manufacturer in the putting-out system, military officer and municipal council. In 1852, he was among the founders and later presided Bank in Menziken (an original predecessor to Valiant Bank).

Vogt completed the schools in Menziken and Reinach before completing a commercial apprenticeship in a banking house.

== Career ==
Initially, Vogt was employed as signing officer with several companies, before taking up residence in Basel, Switzerland working for E. Staehlin-Simon, a tobacco trading company and money change house, near the central station.

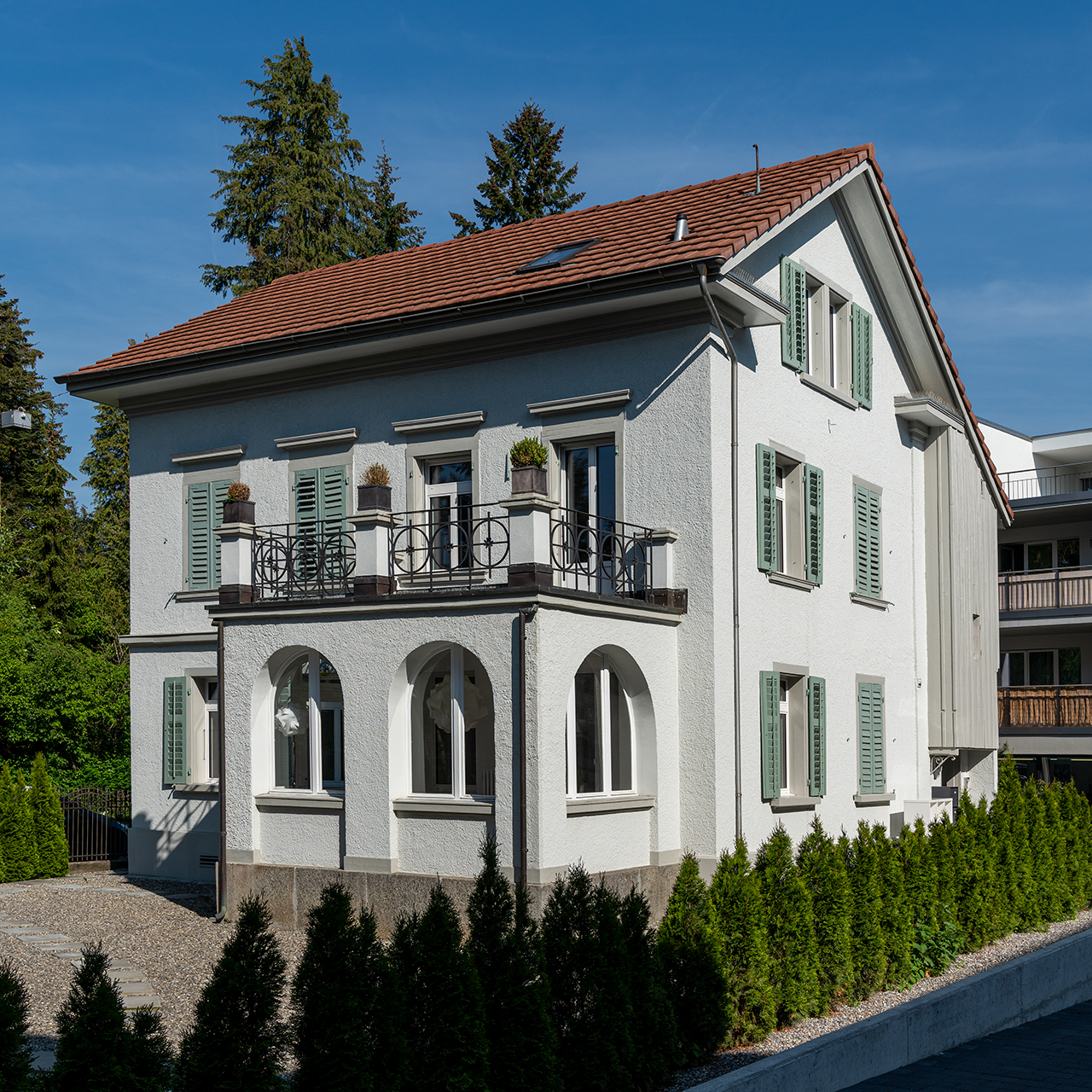
Residence of Betrand Vogt (pictured in 2019)

In 1899, after the death of his father-in-law, Bertrand and his wife returned to Reinach, Aargau. With his brother-in-law, Rudolf Hediger-Strössler (died 1906), and business partner Samuel Erismann, they founded a new tobacco manufacturing concern, named Hediger & Cie. In 1904, the company became a stock corporation, which was presided by Vogt.

Since 1908 he was also a member of the Aargau Natural Research Society and since 1920 he served on the Board of Directors of Bank in Menziken (predecessor of Valiant Bank).

== Personal life ==
Vogt married Emilie Hediger, a daughter of the tobacco manufacturer Johann Rudolf Hediger (1827–1893) who was the proprietor of Hediger Sons (which later merged into Villiger Sons). The couple did not have children.

His estate was turned into the Vogt Brothers Fund in 1937 by his younger brother Manfred Linus Vogt (who also died without issue in 1943). In the Swiss Armed Forces, Vogt was a Lieutenant General (1884 until retirement).
