= PLG =

PLG may refer to:

- Prospect Lefferts Gardens, Brooklyn, New York
- Parti Libéral Genevois, political party in Geneva
- Pierre-Luc Gagnon, Canadian skateboarder
- Plasminogen
- Polegate railway station, Sussex, England
- Polynesian Leaders Group
- Progressive Librarians Guild
- P. League+, Taiwanese basketball league
- Product-led Growth, Go-to market strategy
