= Hediger Sons =

Former Swiss tobacco manufacturing company

- Logo used in the 1950s
- Native name: Hediger Söhne AG
- Type: Private
- Founded: 1856; 170 years ago in Reinach as Heinrich Hediger & Söhne
- Founder: Heinrich Hediger
- Defunct: 1984
- Fate: Merger
- Successor: Villiger Sons
- Key people: Pierre E. Hediger (president)
- Number of employees: 450 (1910)

Hediger Sons (/ˈhɛdɪɡər sʌnz/; officially Hediger Söhne AG) was a former Swiss tobacco manufacturing company which was merged with Villiger in 1984. It was among the largest and second oldest manufacturing company for cigars and cigarillos in the Wynental valley.

In 1899, one of the founders sons and two business partners, created a separate, independent entity named Hediger & Cie which operated until 1971. This company was later also merged with Villiger.

== History ==
Hediger Sons was founded in 1856 by Heinrich Hediger in Reinach, Switzerland who formerly was a cotton manufacturer. In 1871/72 his sons, Rudolf (1827-1893) and Jakob Hediger (1832-1893), would built a modern factory which employed 170+ associates in 1889.

In 1899, Rudolf Hediger-Strössler (died 1906), a son of the founder of Hediger Sons, Samuel Erismann and Bertrand Vogt, formed an independent entity, also in Reinach, which traded as Hediger & Cie. Vogt was Hediger's brother-in-law who ultimately became president of the company.

Hediger Sons was managed by an other descendant of the founders. In 1984, Pierre E. Hediger (a descendant of Jakob), sold the company to Eichenberger & Erismann AG, which took-over the remaining 25 full-time positions. During the last years the manufacturing numbers shrank from 400 Million to 130 Million pieces annually.
