= Mark Muller =

Swiss real estate lawyer and politician

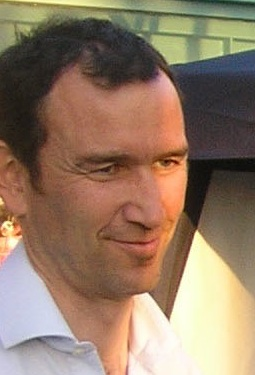
photo of Mark Muller in 2011

Mark Muller (born 26 August 1964 in Geneva) is a Swiss real estate lawyer and politician in the canton of Geneva.

A member of the Parti Libéral Genevois, he has been a member of the Grand Council, a parliamentary body, since 2001.

In November 2005, he was elected to the Geneva Council of State, an executive body. He served therein between 2005 and 2012.

Muller served as Geneva Council of State President for 2011, and until his last day of service, 29 February 2012.
