= Mauro Poggia =

Swiss-Italian politician (born 1959)

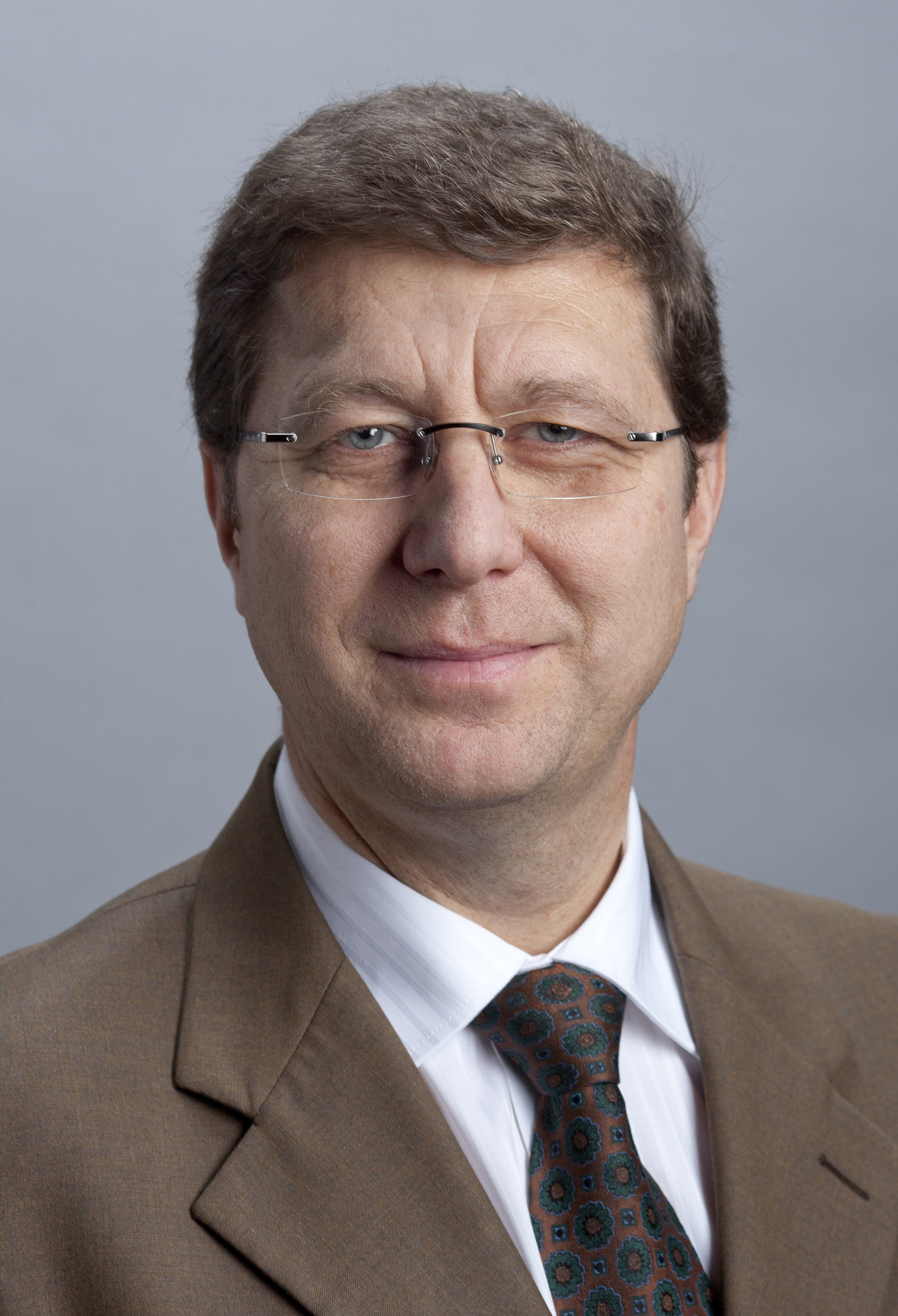

Member of the Council of State of Geneva
- Incumbent
- Assumed office 2013

Member of the National Council of Switzerland
- In office 24 October 2011 – 28 November 2013
- Constituency: Geneva

Personal details
- Born: 25 April 1959 (age 66) Moutier, Bern
- Party: Geneva Citizens' Movement
- Other political affiliations: Christian Democratic People's Party (until 2009); Union of Christian and Centre Democrats
- Profession: Lawyer
- Website: poggia.blog.tdg.ch

Mauro Poggia (born 25 April 1959 in Moutier) is a Swiss-Italian politician. He is a member of the Geneva Citizens' Movement (MCG) and has been a member of the Council of State of Geneva since 2013. Previously, he served in the National Council from the October 2011 election until 2013.

== Biography ==
Formerly a member of the Christian Democratic People's Party (CVP), Poggia left to join the MCG in 2009. He was elected to the Grand Council of Geneva at the 2009 election. He was elected as the MCG's sole member of the National Council at the 2011 election, representing Geneva.

He ran for the Senate of Italy in the 2008 election for the Union of Christian and Centre Democrats, seeking to represent Italians abroad.

He is a convert to Islam, the religion of his wife.

On 12 February 2026, Poggia made public comments regarding the recently erected Eruv in the city of Zurich, criticising the municipality for allowing its installation. He reproached the city’s left-wing majority for supporting such a measure, which he considers to run counter to coexistence and integration. His remarks were criticised by members of Jewish communities across Switzerland.
