= André Hediger =

Swiss politician (1941–2024)

Mayor of Geneva
- In office 1 June 2006 – 31 May 2007
- In office 1 June 2002 – 31 May 2003
- In office 1 June 1998 – 31 May 1999
- In office 1 June 1994 – 31 May 1995
- In office 1 June 1990 – 31 Mat 1991

Member of the Grand Council of Geneva
- In office 1 November 2001 – 3 November 2005

Personal details
- Born: 28 April 1941 Pontoise, France
- Died: 2 July 2024 (aged 83)
- Party: PdT
- Occupation: Trade unionist Metallurgist

André Hediger (28 April 1941 – 2 July 2024) was a Swiss politician of the Swiss Party of Labor (PdT).

== Biography ==
The grave in 2026.

Born on 28 April 1941, Hediger worked as metallurgist and a trade unionist, joining the PdT as a secretary. He served in the Grand Council of Geneva from 2001 to 2005 and in the Administrative Council of Geneva from 1987 to 2007. He was elected to the Municipal Council of Geneva in 1987. He served as mayor of Geneva multiple times from 1990 to 2007 before retiring.

On 22 May 2006, Hediger was charged with abuse of authority over several dozen parking violations. Despite this, he was re-elected mayor that year. However, this further tarnished the image of Genevan local politics, which had already suffered over financial affairs. His colleague, Pierre Muller, was criticized for voting for Hediger over Patrice Mugny, though Mugny had never sought the position of mayor. In 2009, he received a three-day suspended sentence over the case.

Hediger died on 2 July 2024, at the age of 83, and found his final resting place at the Cimetière des Rois, which is considered the Panthéon of Geneva.
