= Fischer Reinach =

- Company type: Private
- Industry: Steel
- Founded: January 1842, 1; 183 years ago in Reinach, Switzerland
- Founder: Johannes Wirz
- Headquarters: Reinach, Switzerland
- Key people: Peter B. Fischer (Chairman); Thomas Fischer (Board Member); Sascha Dätwyler (CEO)
- Owner: Fischer family
- Number of employees: 350+ (2023)
- Parent: FIR Group Ltd.
- Website: fischer-reinach.ch

Fischer Reinach AG (respectively FIR Group AG) is a Swiss steel manufacturing company headquartered in Reinach, Switzerland. Founded in 1842, Fischer is one of the oldest continuously owner-managed companies in Switzerland. In 2017, its 175. anniversary, this was honored by attendance of Federal Councilor Johann Schneider-Ammann.

== History ==
In 1842, Johannes Wirz, introduced mechanical manufacturing of wire in Reinach, Switzerland. Through this he destroyed an entire industry of manufacturers who primarily constructed such products by hand. Wirz was one of the pioneers of the European wire industry. Initially he mainly produced hairpins, cape hooks, safety pins and other wire products. When Wirz died in 1889, his son Emil Wirz and grandson Karl Fischer took over the company (which now operated as Wirz & Fischer in a general partnership).

In 1899, after the death of Emil Wirz, who had no children, the company became fully owned by the Fischer family. The company has been trading as Fischer & Co., Drahtwerke since 1918. Fischer received growing competition over the years, specifically of a former foreman of Wirz & Fischer, who left the company in 1895. The company was in a financial crisis on the verge of renaming and only narrowly escaped bankruptcy thanks to financial help from Bertrand Vogt, a brother of Carl Fischer's wife, who injected CHF 200,000 into the company as an emergency loan. Interestingly, he was a half-brother respectively uncle to the owners of the competitor company (Vogt & Co., Wire Works). Through this financial help they continued to grow approximately at the same speed with their competition.

In 1927 Carl Fischer died and the company was taken over by Karl and Willy Fischer. Since 1972, the Fischer company has been a public limited company under the name of Drahtwerke Fischer AG. In 1979, the subsidiary Ferronorm was founded in cooperation with Moos Stahl in Lucerne. This is followed by innovations and the founding of further subsidiaries in Germany and abroad. In 2017, the company celebrates its 175th birthday, making it one of the oldest family businesses in Switzerland.

== Literature ==
- Christoph Zurfluh: Die Häftlimacher, Die Magaziner, 2017 (in German)
