= Guy-Olivier Segond =

Swiss politician (1945–2020)

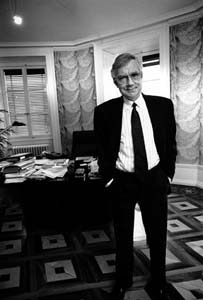

State Councillor of the Canton of Geneva
- In office 11 December 1989 – 3 December 2001
- Preceded by: Jacques Vernet
- Succeeded by: Pierre-François Unger

President of the Council of State of the Canton of Geneva
- In office 7 December 1999 – 5 December 2000
- Preceded by: Olivier Vodoz
- Succeeded by: Jean-Philippe Maître

Member of the Swiss National Council
- In office 30 November 1987 – 25 November 1990
- Succeeded by: Jean Revaclier

Administrative Councillor of Geneva
- In office 1 June 1979 – 31 May 1990
- Preceded by: Lise Girardin
- Succeeded by: Michel Rossetti

Mayor of Geneva
- In office 1 June 1988 – 31 May 1989
- Preceded by: Claude Haegi
- Succeeded by: René Emmenegger
- In office 1 June 1983 – 31 May 1984
- Preceded by: Pierre Marcel Raisin
- Succeeded by: Roger Dafflon

Personal details
- Born: 14 September 1945 Geneva, Switzerland
- Died: 12 November 2020 (aged 75) Geneva, Switzerland
- Party: PRD; PLR

Guy-Olivier Segond (14 September 1945 – 12 November 2020) was a Swiss politician.

== Biography ==
Born in 1945 in Geneva, Segond earned his law license from the University of Geneva. From 1970 to 1979, he was a legal advisor with the Department of Public Education. He also chaired the Protestant Church of Geneva from 1970 to 1975. In the 1980s, he received a life-saving kidney operation.

A member of the Free Democratic Party of Switzerland (PRD), Segond began his political career in 1979 when he took over the vacated seat of Lise Girardin on the Administrative Council of Geneva. He was in charge of the Department of Social Affairs, Schools and Parks. He was re-elected in 1983 and 1987. He served as Mayor of Geneva from 1983 to 1984 and 1988 to 1989. On 12 November 1989, he was elected to the Council of State of Geneva. Michel Rossetti, also a member of PRD, succeeded him on the Administrative Council and took over his department. During his tenure, he established more than 100 city playgrounds and helped install a local cable network.

At the same time, Segond also served on the National Council from 1987 to 1990. He resigned in 1990 due to a lack of interest in federal politics. On the Council of State of Geneva, he succeeded Jacques Vernet. He was re-elected in 1993 and 1997 and served as President of the Council from 1995 to 1996 and 1999 to 2000. He was also President of the Federal Commission for Youth from 1980 to 1990. He was a strong Europeanist and fervent supporter of Switzerland's accession into the European Economic Area. In 2001, he chose not to stand for a fourth term, and was described as a great servant of the Canton of Geneva as well having a strong personality with frank conviction.

At the time of Segond's departure from the political scene, the PRD party was ailing, as most seats in the Canton of Geneva were now occupied by right-wing parties. On this issue, he said "It is a big mistake to see political events through the emotional grid. Politics is a balance of power, conflicts of interest and fights of ideas, not a love story. If the reading grid is emotional, trouble is programmed".

In January 2002, Segond was appointed Special Ambassador to the Secretary General of the International Telecommunication Union, Yoshio Utsumi. He was in charge of political preparation for the World Summit on the Information Society in 2003, which was held in Geneva. In 2011, he appeared as a witness in the trial of the Banque cantonale de Genève. Although he was not at the forefront of the matter, he served on the Council of State during the allegations. The risky debts of this case amounted to 5 to 6 billion Swiss francs, or approximately the annual state budget of the Canton of Geneva. He explained that, before 1999, the Canton was not particularly worried about bank accounts.

Segond was involved in several associations, including the Swiss-Chinese Association and the World Association for the School as an Instrument of Peace. Although retired, he remained very active politically, expressing his disappointment for the 2013 Geneva constitution. He continued to be heavily active within his party, which, after a merger, had become FDP.The Liberals. He was one of the key political figures to show his support for Pierre Maudet until the exposure of the Maudet Affair.

Guy-Olivier Segond died in Geneva on 12 November 2020 at the age of 75. He is buried at the Cimetière des Rois ("Cemetery of Kings"), which is widely considered the Pantheon of Geneva.

== Filmography ==
In 1993, Segond appeared in the film L'État c'est quoi ? I : Élire, directed by Patrick Conscience. The film aimed to educate young people about citizenship and politics.
