= Fêtes de Genève =

Geneva Festival Fêtes de Genève
- Genre: Music concerts, fairground attractions, fireworks
- Frequency: Annual
- Locations: Geneva, Switzerland
- Years active: 1947–2017; Grand Fireworks continue to present
- Organiser: Fondation Genève tourisme et congrès
- Website: www.fetesdegeneve.ch

The Fêtes de Genève (Geneva Festival) was an annual summer event in Geneva, Switzerland. It included a grand fireworks display.

== History ==
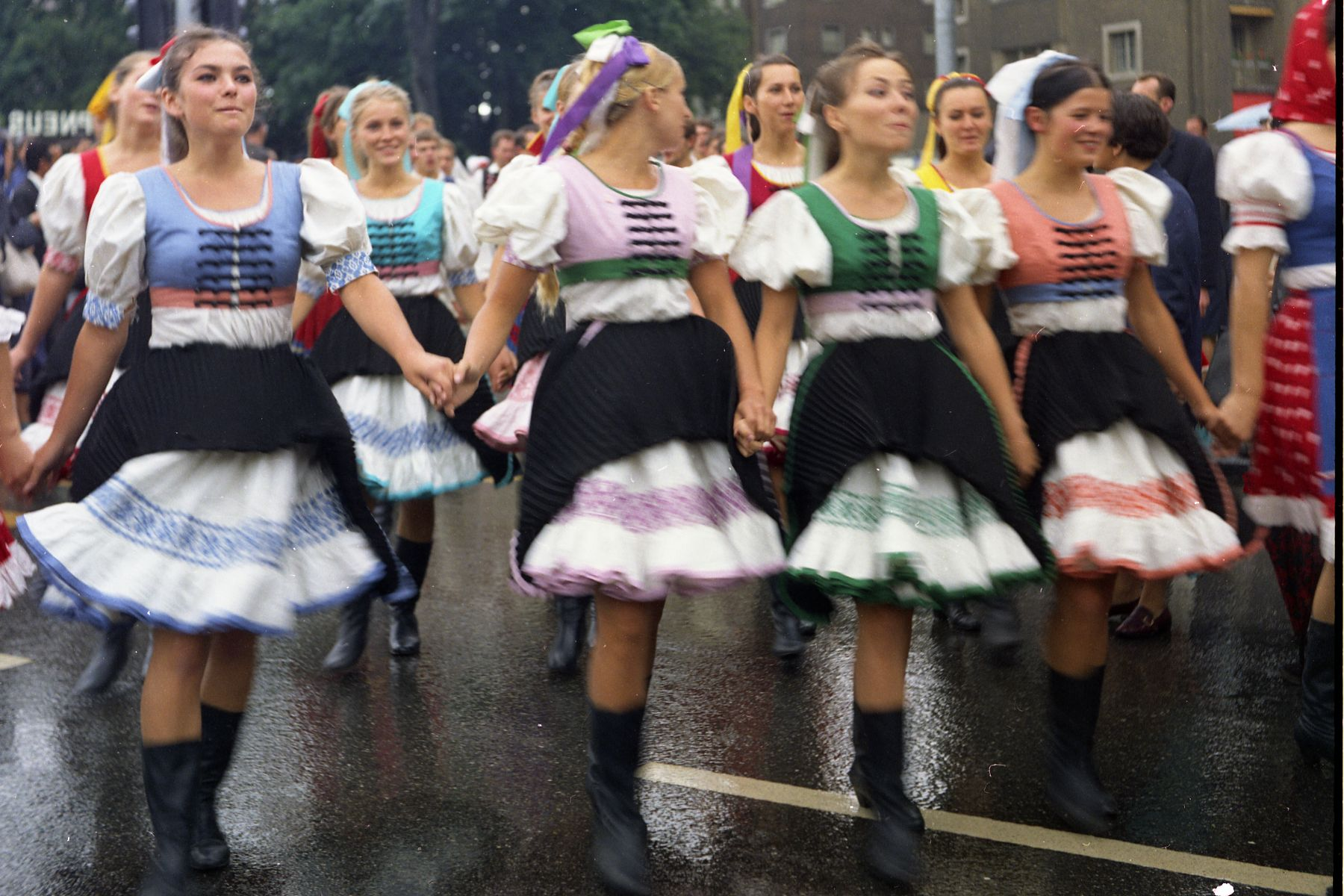
Female parade participants, 1968

The Fêtes de Genève started during the first half of the twentieth century. Having suffered financial losses in 2014 and 2017, the festival was abandoned as of 2018. However, the grand fireworks still takes place; it was held on 11 August in 2018 and on 10 August in 2019.

== Grand firework display ==
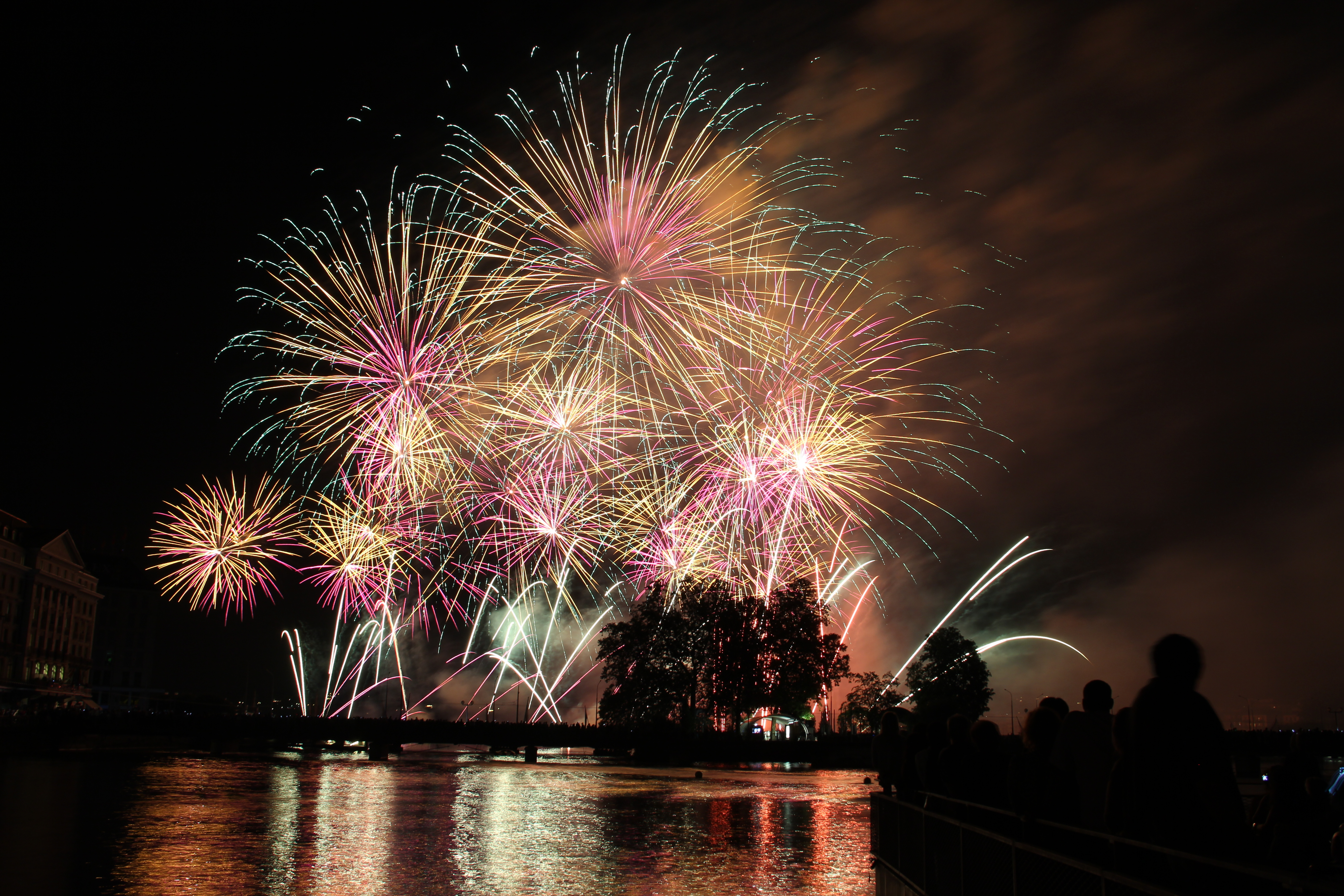
Fireworks at the Fêtes de Genève, 2012

Every year, on a Saturday evening of mid-August, the Geneva Festival presented a grand fireworks display (French: grand feu d'artifice pyromélodique) over Lake Geneva. The event was free although it had a budget of 500,000 to 700,000 Swiss francs. The fireworks involved about forty firing stations on the lake and about 30,000 rockets; they were about one-hour long and accompanied by music.

In 2013, according to the Radio télévision suisse, hundreds of thousands of people came to Geneva to see the grand fireworks display of the Fêtes de Genève. The Swiss Federal Railways organize special trains to bring the spectators home after the fireworks.

== See also ==
- Jardin anglais
- Geneva International Film Festival Tous Ecrans
