= Geneva Citizens' Movement =

Geneva Citizens' Movement Mouvement Citoyens Genevois
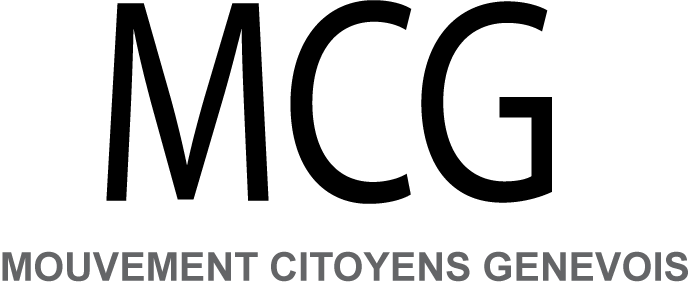
- Founded: 2005
- Membership (2015): 1,500
- Ideology: Right-wing populism; Regionalism; National conservatism
- Political position: Right-wing to far-right
- Colours: Yellow; Red
- National Council (Geneva seats): 2 / 12
- Council of States (Geneva seats): 1 / 2
- Council of State of Geneva: 0 / 7
- Grand Council of Geneva: 14 / 100

Website
- www.mcge.ch/

The Geneva Citizens' Movement (French: Mouvement Citoyens Genevois), abbreviated to MCG, is a right-wing populist political party in the Canton of Geneva, Switzerland. On its own initiative, it started, and is a part of, the wider Romandy Citizens' Movement (French: Mouvement Citoyens Romand), abbreviated to MCR.

== History ==
The MCG was co-founded in 2005 by Éric Stauffer and Georges Letellier. It established itself as the canton's third most powerful political party in the 2009 legislative election, winning 17 out of 100 seats in the Grand Council of Geneva.

In 2010, the MCG formed a wider party organization with chapters throughout the cantons of Romandy, called the Mouvement Citoyen Romand (MCR). However, only the Geneva chapter has seen real success.

The MCG made large gains in the March 2011 cantonal local elections, helping end a 20-year-old majority by left-of-center parties in the parliament of the city of Geneva.

In 2013, the MCG further increased its share in the Grand Council of Geneva to 20 seats. In addition, it gained a seat in the Council of State of Geneva, the executive organ of the canton, with Mauro Poggia taking the seat.

In the federal election of October 2011, the MCG won one of Geneva's eleven seats in the National Council, with Mauro Poggia (b. 1959), formerly of the Christian Democrats and also the Italian Union of Christian and Centre Democrats. The MCG retained its one seat in the 2015 elections, later losing it in the 2019 elections. In the 2023 elections, the MCG won two seats in the National Council and one in the Council of States.

=== Grand Council of Geneva election results ===
Year	Votes	%	Seats
2005	6,619	7.73%	9
2009	12,733	14.74%	17
2013	17,645	19.23%	20
2018	8,326	9.43%	11
2023	10,603	11.72%	14

== Ideology ==
The MCG calls itself neither left-wing nor right-wing. However, the party is often referred to as right-wing populist, far-right, or xenophobic by political opponents and the media.

The MCG campaigns on a platform of opposition to established party politics (classe politique) and to the 115,000 cross-border commuters from France, calling for the priority allocation of jobs to Swiss citizens. The MCG takes eurosceptic or nationalist positions, such as supporting the preeminence of Swiss law before international law, opposing the bilateral accords with the European Union, and supporting reducing immigration. In addition, it supported a strict implementation of the 2014 Swiss immigration referendum, which aimed to limit immigration through quotas.

As of 2015, the MCG supports increased funding for renewable energies. It believes more controls on social welfare are needed, but it does not support reducing benefits in order to reduce costs, preferring "a general reform of the system and not ineffective half-measures." As of 2015, the MCG supports registered partnerships for same-sex couples but opposes full legalization.

== Presidents ==
- Georges Letellier (2005–2006)
- Georges Jost (2006–2008)
- Éric Stauffer (2008–2012)
- Roger Golay (2012–2016)
- Ana Roch (2016–)
