= Jardin Anglais =

Urban park in Geneva, Switzerland

Jardin anglais
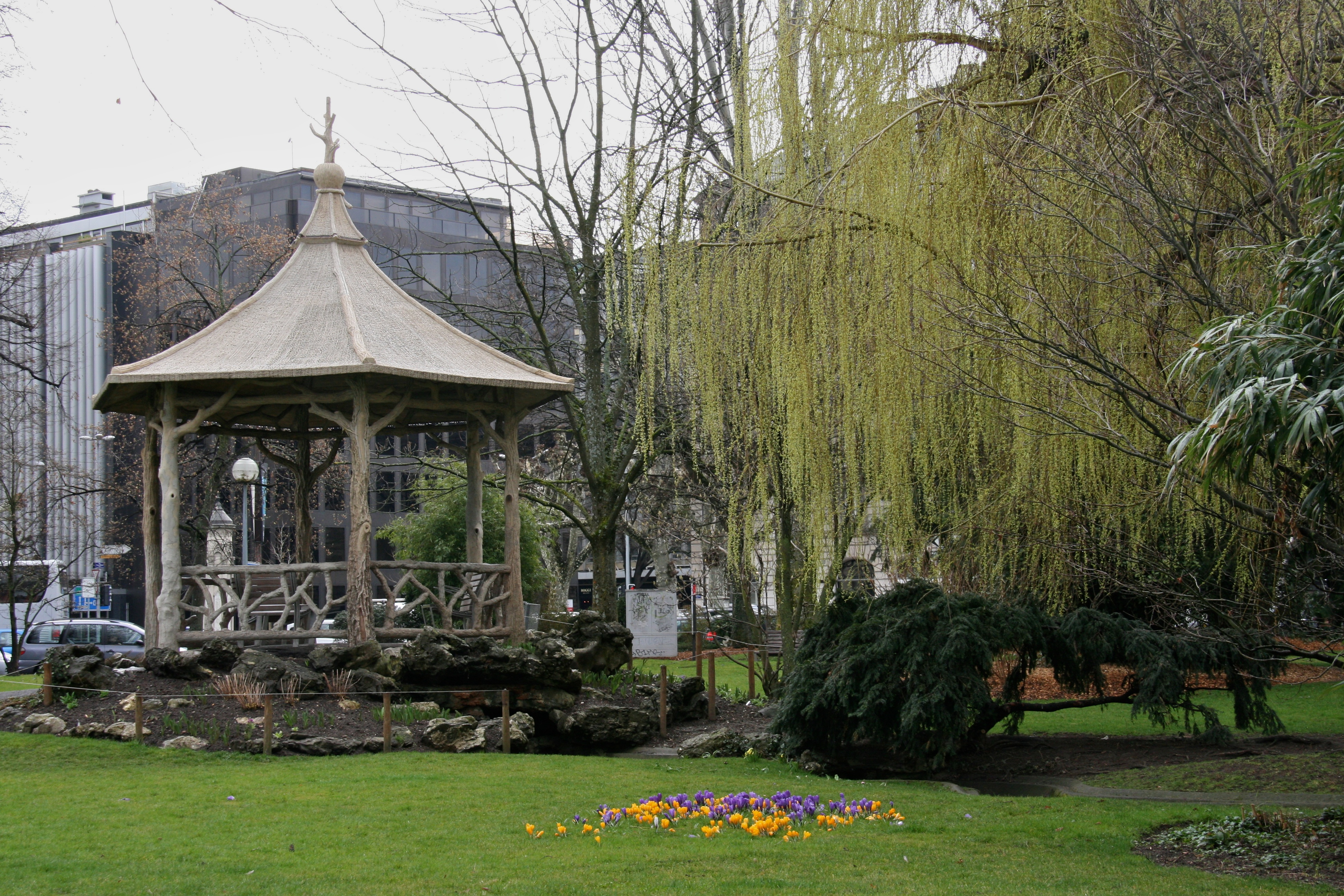
- Interactive map of Jardin anglais
- Location: Geneva, Switzerland
- Coordinates: 46.204°N 6.152°E
- Designation: class A Swiss cultural property of national significance

The Jardin anglais (literally "English garden") is an urban park in Geneva, Switzerland, situated at the location of an ancient harbor and a wood. It marks the beginning of the Quai Gustave-Ador.

The park was created in 1855. In 1863 the building process of the Pont du Mont-Blanc changed the park to its actual form – a trapezoid of 25,430 m^{2} (273,700 sq ft).

The park hosts the Le monument national and the L'horloge fleurie (or Flower clock), besides several pavilions, a sculpted bronze fountain by Alexis Andre, and a coffeehouse.

It hosts the annual Geneva Christmas Market.

== See also ==
- Fêtes de Genève
