= Rémy Pagani =

Mayor of Geneva

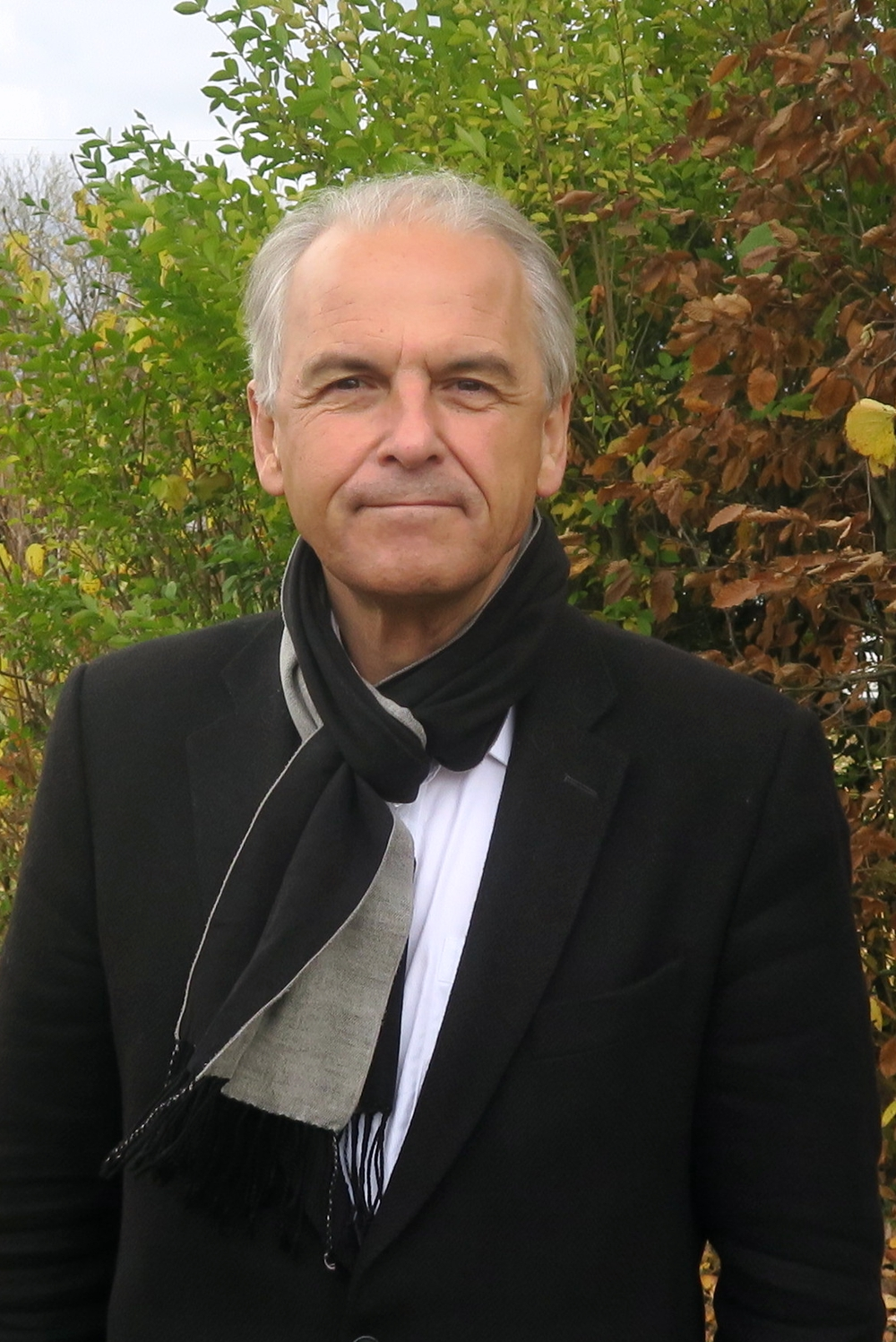
- Rémy Pagani in 2017.

Mayor of Geneva
- In office 1 June 2012 – 31 May 2013
- Preceded by: Pierre Maudet
- Succeeded by: Sandrine Salerno

Mayor of Geneva
- In office 1 June 2009 – 3 May 2010
- Preceded by: Manuel Tornare
- Succeeded by: Sandrine Salerno

Personal details
- Born: 21 April 1954 (age 72) Geneva, Switzerland
- Party: À gauche toute! Genève
- Occupation: Politician

Rémy Pagani (born 21 April 1954) is a Swiss politician. He is a member of À gauche toute! Genève and served as the mayor of Geneva from 1 June 2009 to 3 May 2010. Pagani served as mayor of Geneva for a second time from 1 June 2012 to 31 May 2013.

== Biography ==
Pagani was born on 21 April 1954 in Geneva.

== See also ==
- Politics of Switzerland

Preceded by Manuel Tornare	Mayor of Geneva; 2009-2010	Succeeded by Sandrine Salerno
