= Sandrine Salerno =

Swiss politician

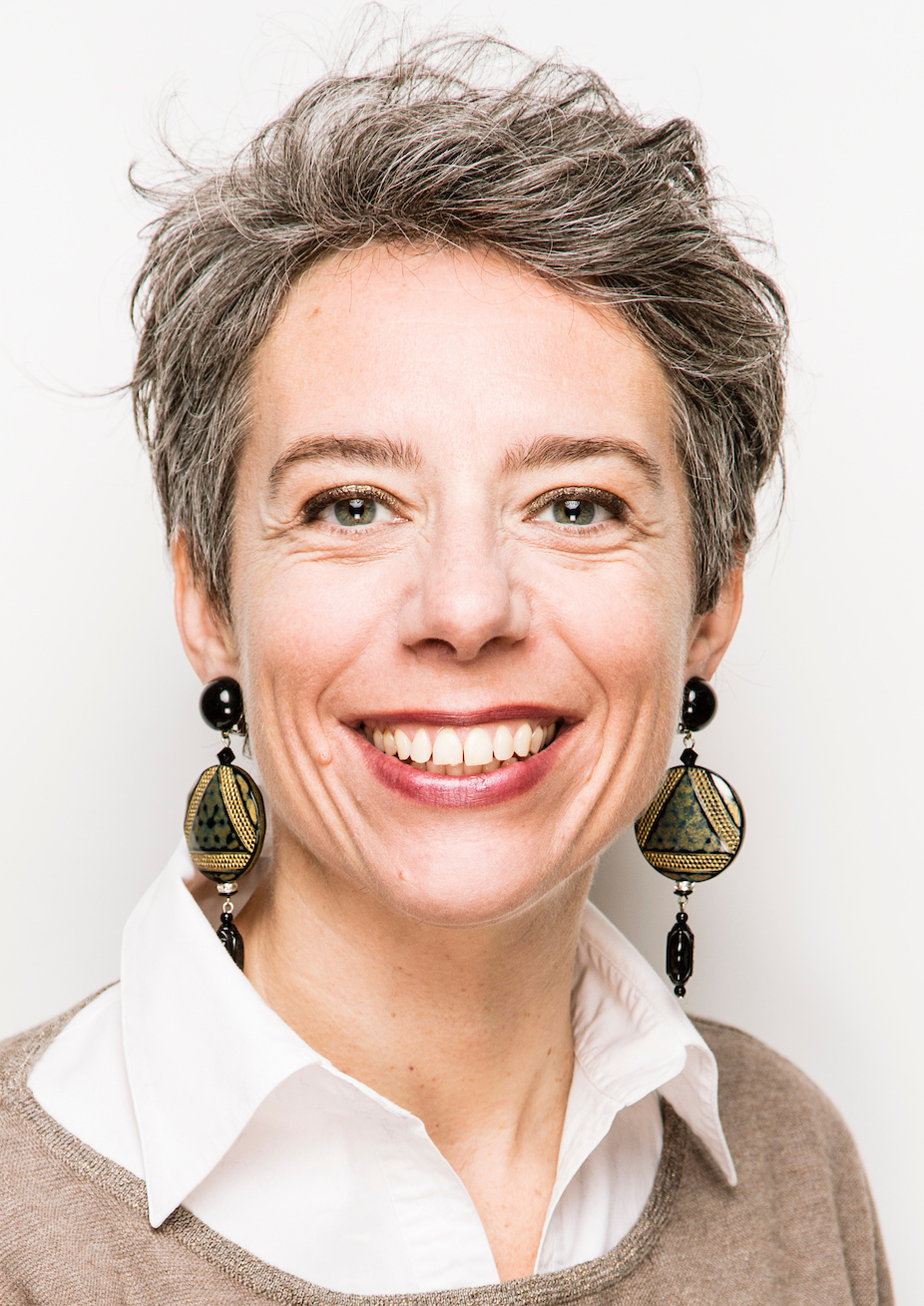

Mayor of Geneva
- In office 1 June 2010 – 31 May 2011
- Preceded by: Rémy Pagani
- Succeeded by: Pierre Maudet
- In office 1 June 2013 – 31 May 2014
- Preceded by: Rémy Pagani
- Succeeded by: Sami Kanaan
- In office 1 June 2019 – 31 May 2020
- Preceded by: Sami Kanaan
- Succeeded by: Esther Alder

Personal details
- Born: 1971 (age 54–55) Geneva, Switzerland
- Party: Socialist Party
- Education: University of Geneva

Sandrine Salerno (born in 1971 in Geneva) is a Swiss politician and a member of the Socialist Party. She was the mayor of the city of Geneva from 2010 to 2011, 2013 to 2014, and 2019 to 2020.

== Background ==
Salerno's mother was French and her father was Italian. She holds more than one passport. She has two children. She holds a master's degree in public administration and a bachelor's degree in political science, both from the University of Geneva. She was elected to Geneva's town council in 1999 and became a member of the executive in 2007. Between 1995 and 1997, she was deputy chief of the European Third World Centre (CETIM) in the human rights programme. She was co-ordinator in the Swiss Immigrants' Contact Centre from 1997 to 2001, a researcher at Geneva University from 2001 to 2006, and deputy head of the University Affairs unit in the Canton of Geneva's Department of Education.

== Office ==
Ms Salerno is the fourth woman to hold office as Mayor of Geneva. Her appointment as mayor was for a fixed term. She has revamped the regulations concerning rents and property management in the city and introduced new working conditions for city staff.

Salerno has been a longtime campaigner for maternity rights. In accordance with a legal decision on gender equality in June 2007 which resulted in an award of 120,000 Swiss francs to the City Council "for the promotion of equality", Salerno announced in February 2008 that she would be taking maternity leave from her then post in the Geneva Department of Finance and Housing in order to bear her second child. Pierre Maudet covered for her during her confinement.
