= Lise Girardin =

Swiss politician

Member of the Council of States
- In office 29 November 1971 – 20 November 1975

Member of the Grand Council of Geneva
- In office November 1961 – November 1973

Mayor of Geneva
- In office 1 June 1975 – 31 May 1976
- In office 1 June 1972 – 31 May 1973
- In office 1 June 1968 – 31 May 1969

Personal details
- Born: 15 February 1921; Geneva, Switzerland
- Died: 16 October 2010 (aged 89)
- Political party: Free Democratic Party

Lise Girardin (15 February 1921 – 16 October 2010) was a Swiss politician. A member of the Free Democratic Party, she was the first woman to be elected mayor of Geneva and the first woman named to the Council of States.

== Biography ==
Lise Girardin was born on 15 February 1921 in Geneva. She graduated from the University of Geneva and became a teacher. In 1960, the Canton of Geneva granted women the right to vote. Girardin, who already held a lower judgeship, ran for and won the 1961 election to the Grand Council of Geneva. In 1968, she was elected mayor, the first woman to hold that post.

After a referendum of 1971, Switzerland granted women's suffrage at the federal level. In the 1971 elections later that year, Girardin was elected to the Council of States while 10 others were elected to the National Council, making them the first women to sit in the Federal Assembly.

Girardin left the Council of States after the 1975 Swiss federal election but remained active in politics. She served one more term as Mayor of Geneva and participated in various referendums. Girardin died on October 16, 2010.
