= 2009 Geneva Grand Council election =

The 2009 election to the Grand Council was held in the canton of Geneva, Switzerland, on 11 October 2009. All 100 members of the Grand Council were elected for four-year terms.

The Liberal Party remained the largest party, with twenty seats, having lost three since 2005. The centre-right 'Entente', between the Liberals, Free Democratic Party, and Christian Democrats lost a total of five seats. The main winners were the populist Geneva Citizens' Movement, who almost doubled their number of seats to draw level with the Green Party as the second-largest contingent. The far left alliance between solidaritéS and the Swiss Party of Labour failed to overcome the 7% threshold for representation, despite each having each separately received more than 6% at the 2005 election.

== Results ==
Summary of the 11 October 2009 Geneva Grand Council election results
Party	Ideology	Vote %	Vote % ±	Seats	Seats ±
Liberal Party	Classical liberalism	16.71	–1.71	20	–3
Green Party	Green politics	15.34	+1.51	17	+1
Geneva Citizens' Movement	Populism	14.74	+7.01	17	+8
Social Democratic Party	Social democracy	12.91	–1.71	15	–2
Christian Democratic People's Party	Christian democracy	9.91	+0.07	11	–1
Free Democratic Party	Classical liberalism	9.59	–0.90	11	–1
Swiss People's Party	National conservatism	8.56	–1.04	9	–2
solidaritéS–Swiss Party of Labour	Socialism	6.40	–7.17^{1}	0	±0
Defence of the Elderly	Pensioners' party	5.85	N/A	0	N/A
Total (turnout 39.66%)		100.00	–	100	–
^{1} Compared to total of separate solidaritéS (6.67%) and 'Alliance of the Left' (6.90%) lists in 2005
Source: Republic and Canton of Geneva
