= L'horloge fleurie =

Outdoor flower clock in Jardin Anglais, Geneva, Switzerland

Coordinates: 46.204192°N 6.150970°E

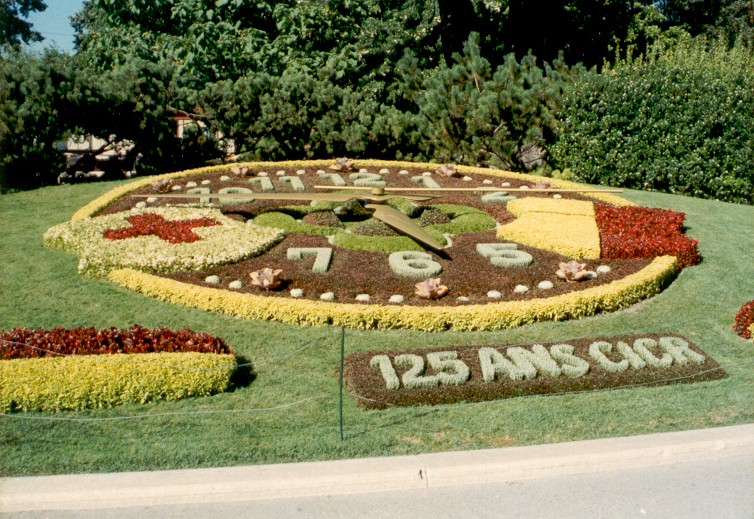
L'horloge fleurie in Geneva, planted for the 125th anniversary of the ICRC.

L'horloge fleurie, or the flower clock, is an outdoor flower clock located on the western side of Jardin Anglais park in Geneva, Switzerland.

Around 6,500 flowering plants and shrubs are used for the clock face. The plants are changed as the seasons change.

== History ==
The clock was created in 1955 as a symbol of the city's watchmakers, and a dedication to nature.

Its second hand is the longest in the world, at 2.5 metres (8.2 ft). It was the largest flower clock in the world, with a diameter of 5 metres (16 ft), until the 2005 installation of a 15-metre (49 ft) one in Tehran, Iran.
