= Helvetic Wings =

Swiss airline

IATA	ICAO	Call sign
HWI	—	—
- Founded: October 2003
- Commenced operations: 21 June 2004
- Ceased operations: 11 October 2004
- Parent company: Twin Jet
- Headquarters: Geneva, Switzerland

Helvetic Wings was a short-lived Swiss airline based in Geneva.

== History ==
The airline was established by Twin Jet in October 2003 and started operations on 21 June 2004. It ceased operations on October 11, 2004, but depending on the success of future financial investment, hoped to restart services, which however never materialized.

== Fleet ==
Helvetic Wings operated Raytheon Beech 1900C Airliner aircraft.
