= Frédérique Perler =

Swiss politician

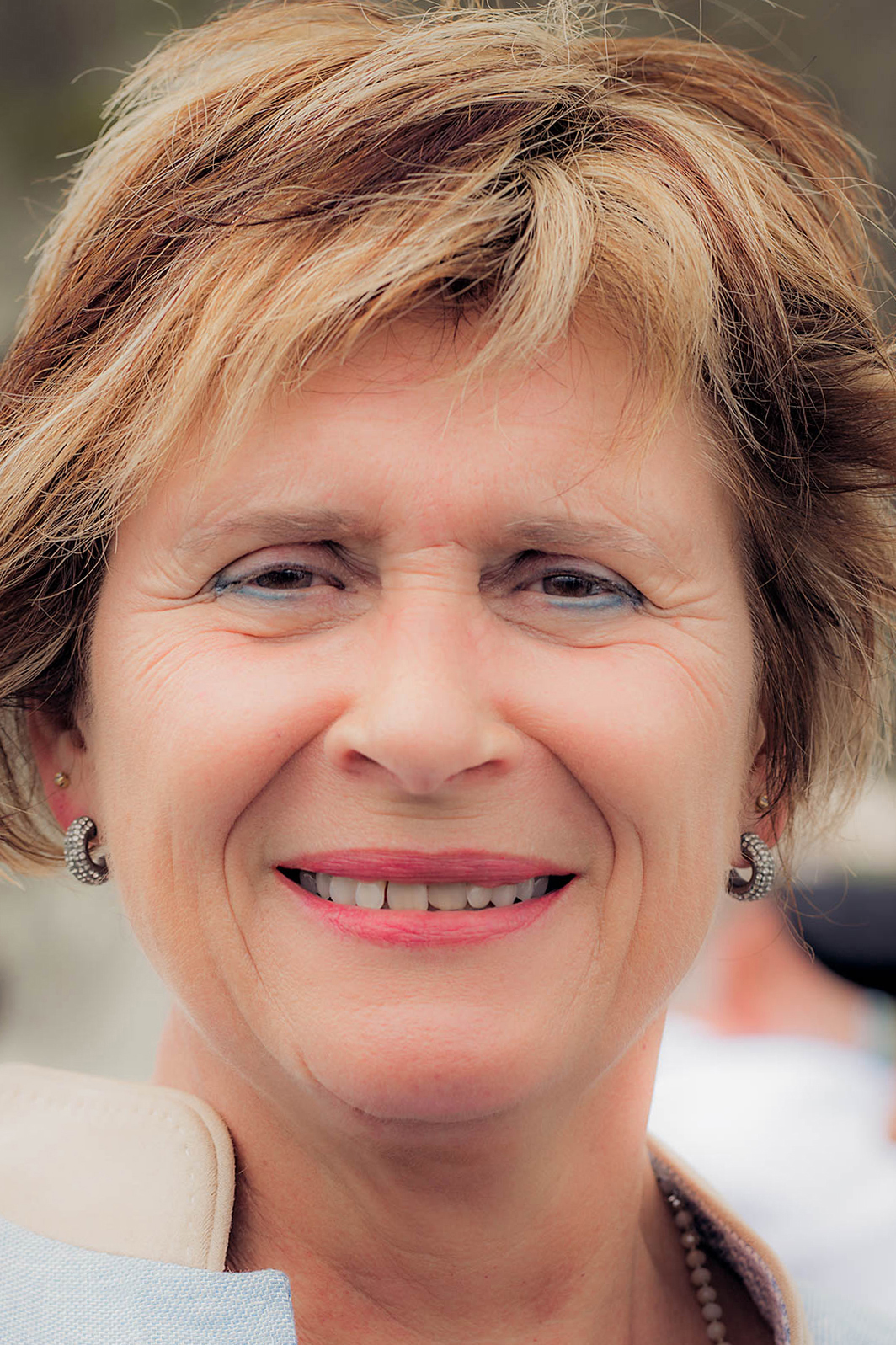
Frédérique Perler in June 2021

Frédérique Perler (born August 21, 1960, in Basel) is a Geneva politician and member of the Green Party. She is an administrative councillor (executive) of the city of Geneva since June 1, 2020, at the head of the department of planning, construction and mobility. She is also Mayor of Geneva since June 1, 2021.

== Biography ==
Frédérique Perler was born on August 21, 1960 in Basel, to a father from Vaud and a French mother.

She moved to Geneva in 1967, following her parents' divorce. Her mother worked in the computer field, in the Fiat car factory. She obtained a diploma in social work at the Institute of Social Studies in Geneva in the early 1980s, where she wrote her thesis with Ueli Leuenberger. She later obtained several advanced study certificates (practitioner trainer, debt management and social policy at the University of Geneva).

She worked from 1985 to 2020 at the Centre social Protestant, as a social worker and then as a trainer.

She is married and has two children.

== Political career ==
She began her political career as a municipal councillor (legislative) in the city of Geneva. She was elected for two terms from 2003 to 2013. She was president of the City Council from 2010 to 2011.

Vice-president of the Geneva Greens from 2016 to 2020, she was a member of the Grand Council of the Canton of Geneva from 7 November 2013 to 4 June 2020. Initially not elected, she took the place of Antonio Hodgers, who refused the mandate of deputy.

On April 5, 2020, she was elected in the second round to the Administrative Council of the City of Geneva. She takes the head of the Department of Planning, Construction and Mobility.

She was elected mayor of the city of Geneva on June 1, 2021.
