= À gauche toute! Genève =

To all left! Geneva French: À gauche toute! Genève
- Leader: Josef Zisyadis
- Founded: 2005
- Ideology: Socialism
- Political position: Left-wing to far-left
- Colours: Red
- Grand Council of Geneva: 0 / 100

Website
- www.agauchetoute.org

À gauche toute! Genève is a political coalition in the canton of Geneva (Switzerland) founded in 2006. It is a regrouping of the Genevan Communist Party, the Swiss Labour Party, solidaritéS and the Left Independents.

In 2005, the Left Alliance, which united the Labour Party, solidaritéS and the Independents, broke up because of political differences. In the Genevan cantonal elections in the autumn of 2005, these parties failed to obtain the quorum of 7% of votes because of the divisions caused by the presence of a Communist Party List. The far left are excluded from parliament.

The following year, the far left were able to enter a communal project. The new coalition took the name of A Gauche toute! and joined the national coalition of the same name led by Vaudois Josef Zisyadis, who organised the far left at the national level.

In the communal elections of 25 March 2007, À gauche toute! Genève stood on the lists of 10 communes. In the town of Geneva, À gauche toute! presented 43 candidates including Catherine Gaillard, Marie-France Spielmann, Salika Wenger and Jérôme Béguin.
