= Guillaume Barazzone =

Swiss politician

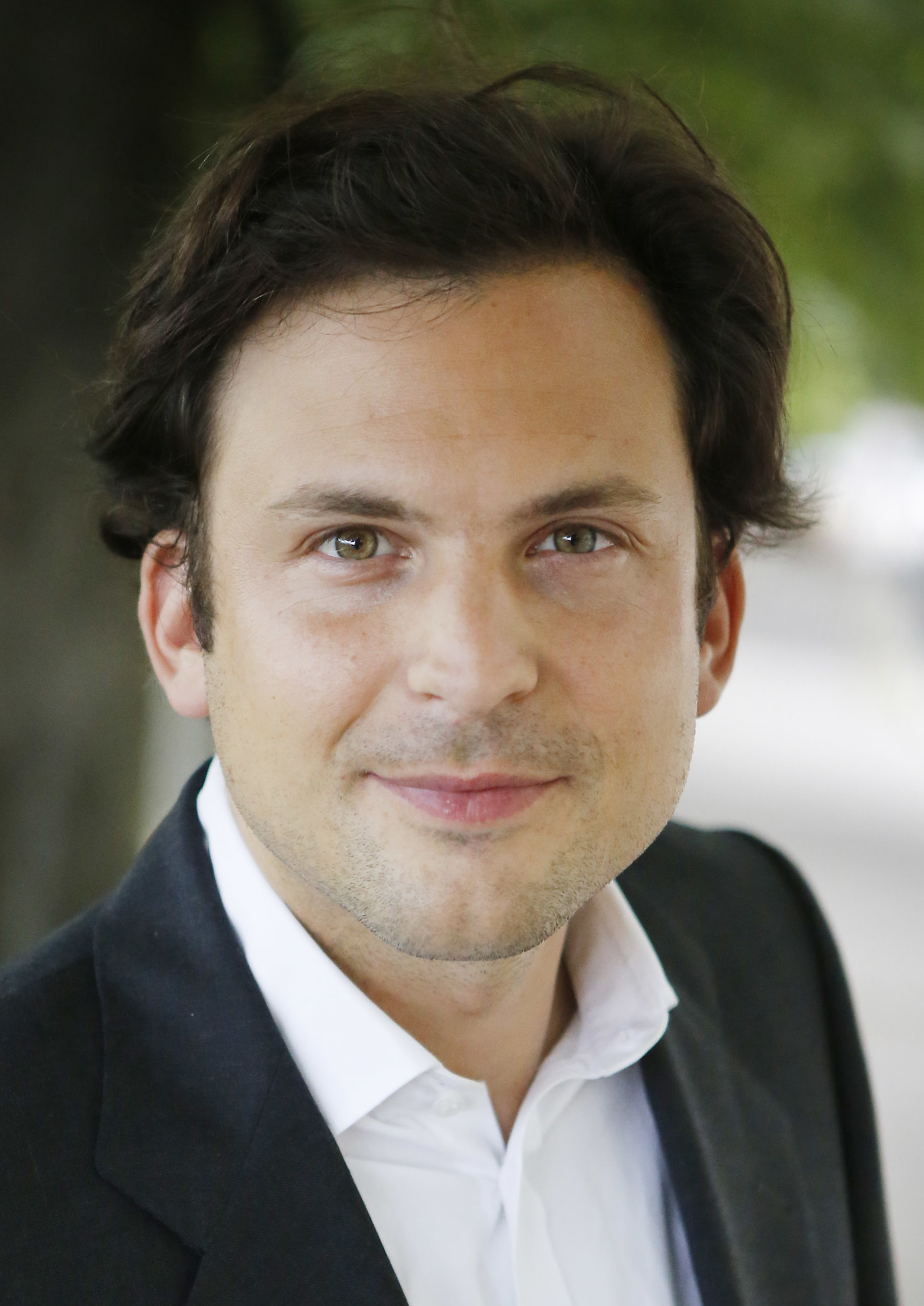

Member of the Swiss National Council
- Incumbent
- Assumed office 9 December 2013
- Preceded by: Luc Barthassat

Administrative Councillor (vice-mayor) in Geneva
- Incumbent
- Assumed office 14 November 2012

Member of the Cantonal Parliament of Geneva
- In office 2005–2012

City Councillor in Geneva
- In office 2003–2006

Personal details
- Born: 1982 Geneva, Switzerland
- Party: Swiss CDP

Guillaume Barazzone (born 13 January 1982, in Geneva, Switzerland), is a former politician and member of the Swiss Christian Democratic Party (CDP). He is elected to the Administrative Council for the City of Geneva in 2012 and member of the Swiss National Council since December 2013.

== Biography ==
Guillaume Barazzone, an Italian-Swiss binational, was born and educated in Geneva. He studied at the University of Geneva where he obtained a law degree in 2005 with an exchange year at Zurich University.

He holds a master's degree in law (L.L.M.) from Columbia Law School in New York City where he graduated in 2011. He has also studied at the School of International and Public Affairs (SIPA) Columbia University.

In 2008, he was admitted to the Geneva bar and practised as a lawyer until 2012 at law firms Lenz & Staehlin (2008–2010) and Schellenberg Wittmer (2011–2012).

In 2012, he was selected by Swiss economical magazine 'l'Hebdo' as one of the 100 personalities of the French part of Switzerland (for the 'Forum des 100').

In 2015, he was a Young Global Leader of the World Economic Forum for Europe.

== Political career ==
=== City of Geneva ===
On 4 November 2012, Guillaume Barazzone was elected to the Government of the city of Geneva (vice-Mayor), ending 20 years of absence of the CDP. He presides over the Department for Urban Environment and Security (DUES).

The 2012–2015 report his legislature presented in January 2015 "created a buzz" in Geneva due to its excellent results and original presentation.

In 2005, he was elected to the State Parliament of Geneva, and was re-elected in 2009 for a total of seven years with the legislature. As a member, he sat on a number of commissions including the following committees: "Fiscal", "Legislative" and "Management Control".

He registered with the Christian Democratic Party (CDP) when he was 18 years old and was the President of the Young CDP of Geneva. He began his political career with the Geneva City Council on which he sat from 2003 to 2006.

=== National Council ===
Guillaume Barazzone was elected to the Swiss National Council (Swiss Parliament) on 9 December 2013, where he is a member of the Legal Affairs Committee.

During his mandate with the National Council, Guillaume Barazzone initiated numerous actions and tabled a number of motions. The motion for compensating asbestos victims was viewed positively at the national level.

In December 2014, he was awarded the silver medal for Genevan Parliamentarians published by the newspaper Tribune de Genève. He was also named the "revelation of the Geneva delegation" and considered in the most influential members of parliament 2015 rankings.

=== Key dates ===
- Member of the National Council since December 2013.
- Elected to the Administrative Council for the City of Geneva in 2012.
- Re-elected to the Cantonal Parliament in 2009.
- Elected Member of the Cantonal Parliament (2005–2009).
- Elected Municipal Councillor for the City of Geneva (2003–2006).
