= Marie Barbey-Chappuis =

Swiss politician

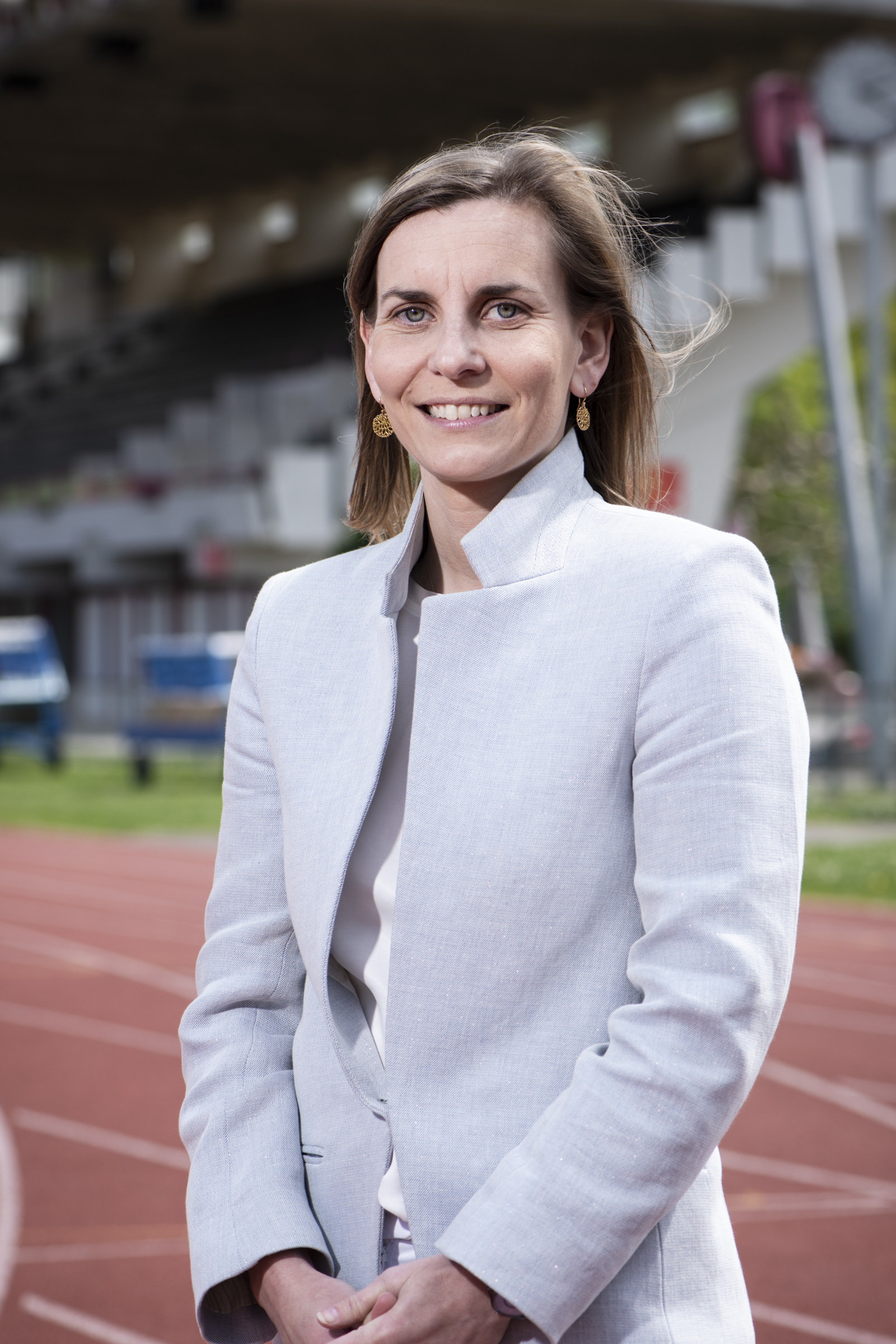
2022 portrait of Marie Barbey-Chappuis

Marie Barbey-Chappuis (born May 14, 1981, in Geneva) is a Swiss politician and member of the Centre. She has been a member of the administrative council of the city of Geneva since June 1, 2020, where she was in charge of the Department of Security and Sports. She became mayor of Geneva on June 1, 2022.

== Biography ==
Marie Barbey-Chappuis was born Marie Chappuis on May 14, 1981, to an engineer father and owner of a small business and a mother who was a primary school teacher.

She grew up in Geneva, in the Florissant district. She completed her schooling in Geneva and passed her maturity diploma at Calvin College in 2000.

In 2004, she obtained a degree in international relations from the Graduate Institute of International and Development Studies. The following year, she obtained a postgraduate degree in journalism from Université Laval in Canada.
