= Villiger Sons =

Swiss multinational Cigarillo & Cigar Manufacture

Villiger Söhne Holding AG
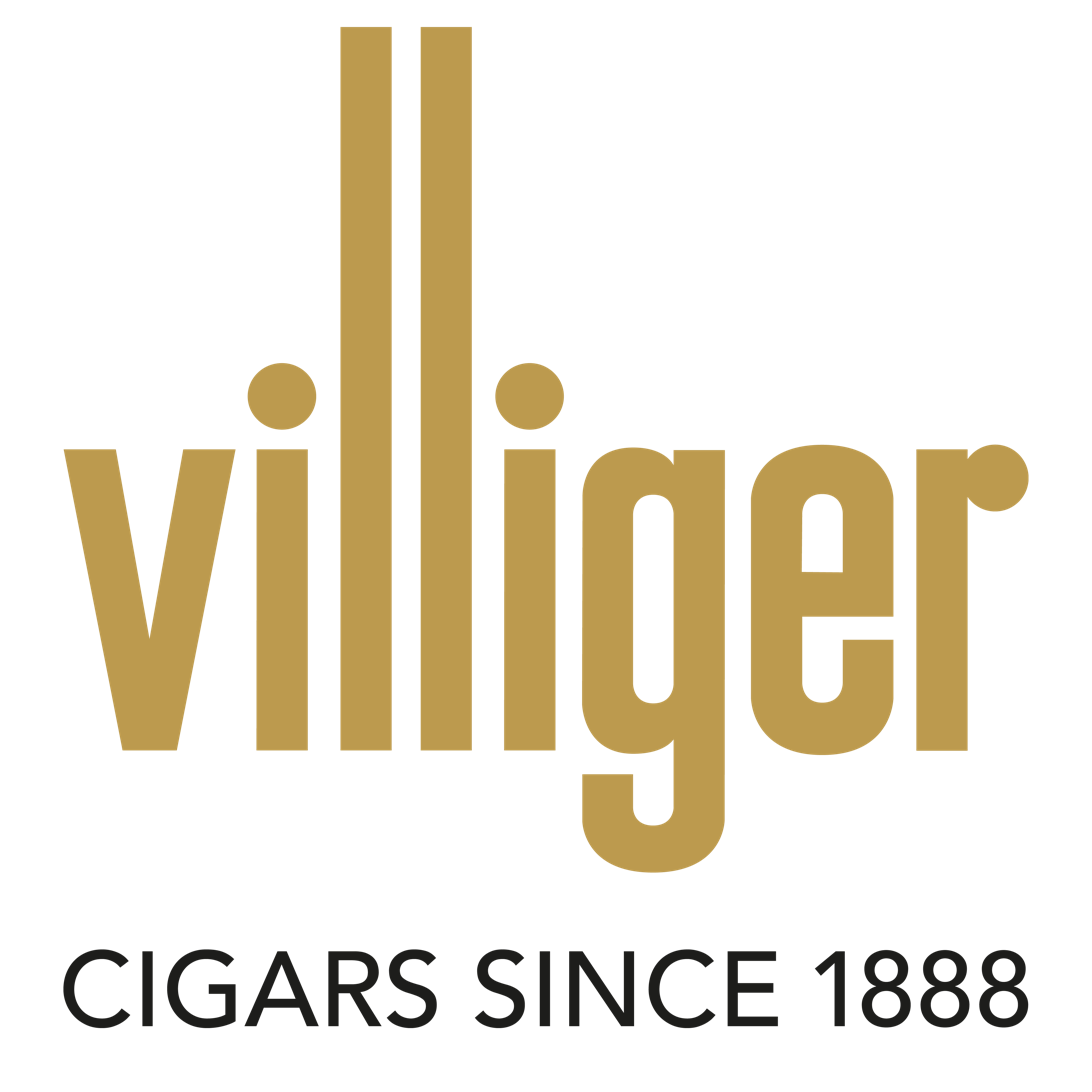
- Company type: Private company
- Industry: Tobacco
- Founded: 1888; 138 years ago in Pfeffikon, Switzerland
- Founder: Jean Villiger
- Headquarters: Pfeffikon, Switzerland
- Area served: Worldwide
- Products: Cigars & Cigarillos
- Revenue: Approx. CHF 140 million (as of 2025)
- Owner: Villiger family
- Number of employees: Over 1,200 worldwide (as of 2025)
- Website: Official website

Villiger Sons (officially Villiger Söhne Holding AG) is a Swiss multinational concern which manufactures and sells cigars and cigarillos and other tobacco products. Founded in 1888, the company is family owned and managed in the fourth, respectively fifth generation, and employs over 1,200 people worldwide. Villiger has a revenue of approximately CHF 140 million (as of 2025). Besides owning several factories as subsidiaries in countries such as the Dominican Republic, Nicaragua and Indonesia. Villiger is also present on the U.S. market and has opened a new subsidiary of Villiger North America, Inc. in Doral, Florida in 2016.

== History ==
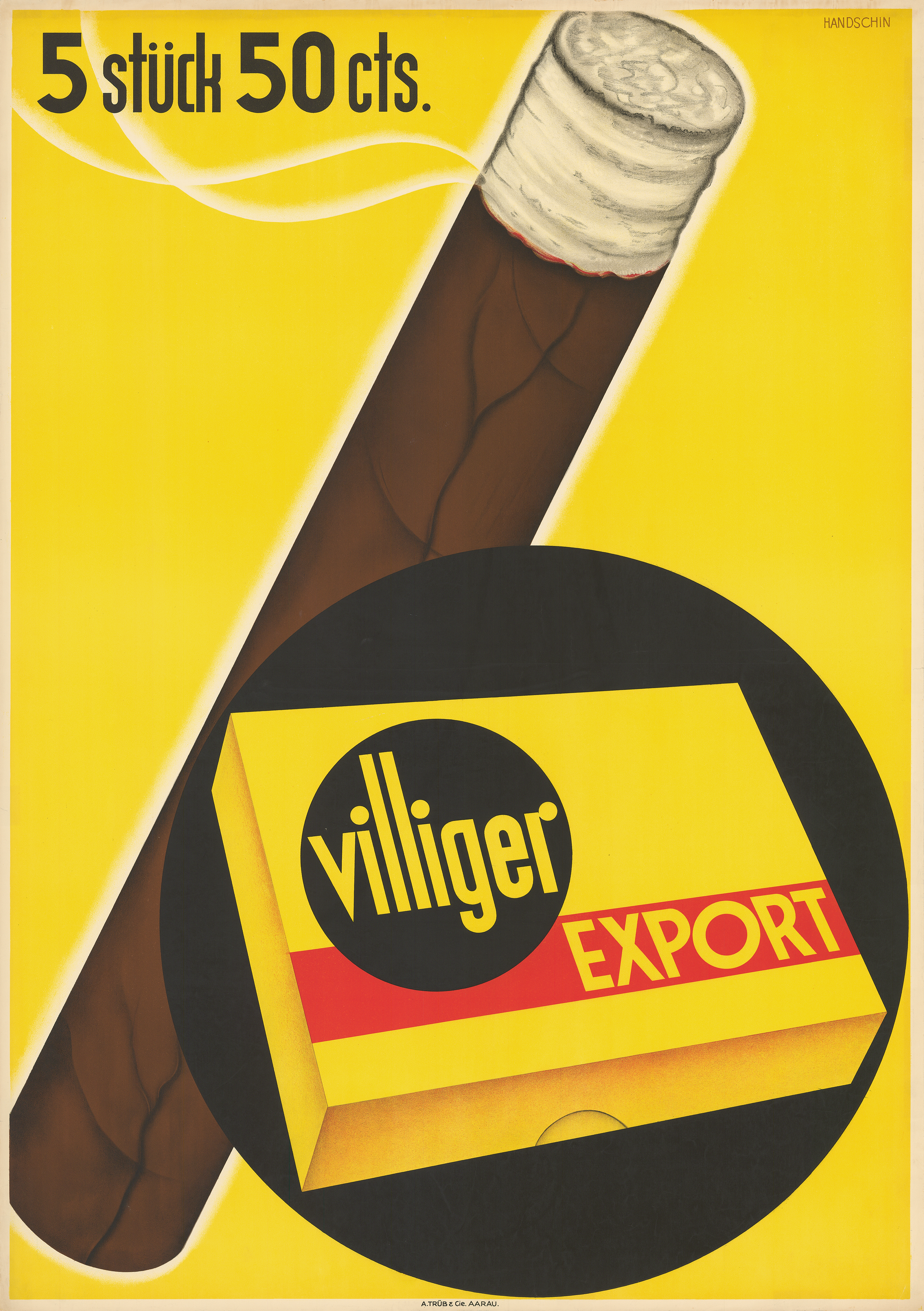
1937 advertisement for Villiger Export cigars

In 1888 Jean Villiger founded a small tobacco factory, in his native village of Pfeffikon, Switzerland. He died early in 1902 and the business was subsequently managed by his wife Louise (née Ottiger) since the children were still minors. In 1910 Louise Villiger founded the first subsidiary of the company, in nearby Tiengen, Grand Duchy of Baden. Today this branch is even larger than the Swiss headquarters founded over twenty years earlier (Villiger Söhne GmbH). After her sons reached legal age and returned from gaining professional experience abroad (specifically in the United States for Max) they took-over the company in the early 1920s. The management was now with Max Villiger (1897–1966) and his brother Hans Villiger (1892–1981). They were responsible for building the company into a multinational concern and international brand.

Due to Hans not having children, Max's children gradually entered the company. Heinrich Villiger (1930–2025) who intended to study economics, was the first one and passed on his studies after completing the Matura, and was instead educated in the tobacco trade. He chaired and had the controlling interest of the family business. He is believed to be the oldest tobacco manufacturer in the world who was still active in daily business. The middle daughter, Monika Villiger (born 1936), became a member of the company only in 1967 when she joined as export director. She would later become a curator of history and engages in municipal civic organizations such as the tobacco museum. The youngest child and son of the family, Kaspar Villiger, would be a majority shareholder of the concern until his election into Federal Council (Switzerland) in 1989. He served one term as President of the Swiss Confederation in 1995.

Since 1989 Villiger is managed by Heinrich Villiger (and his descendants). He founded the first joint venture together with Cuban partners for the exclusive import and distribution of Havana cigars in Germany, which is known as Fifth Avenue Trading Products GmbH. The company has several subsidiaries. Since 2016 they have a permanent office in the United States (Villiger North America Inc.) and in 2021 they opened a new production facility in Esteli, Nicaragua.

== Production and sites ==
Villiger produces over a billion cigars and cigarillos every year. Production is concentrated at five sites:

- Pfeffikon, Lucerne (Switzerland) – company headquarters
- Waldshut-Tiengen, Baden-Württemberg (Germany) – company administration
- Bünde, North Rhine-Westphalia (Germany)
- Jember, Java (Indonesia)
- Estelí (Nicaragua) – joint venture

== Origin of the tobacco and products ==
Villiger utilizes raw tobacco from various renowned growing regions worldwide, including the Dominican Republic, Nicaragua, Honduras, and Brazil.

Villiger produces machine-made and hand-rolled cigars and cigarillos. Its product range includes the following lines:

Hand-rolled cigars: Corrida, La Capitana, La Libertad, Nicaroma, Villiger 1492, Villiger 1888, Villiger 1888 Nicaragua

Machine-made products: Constellation, Villiger Cortos, Villiger Export, Villiger Kiel, Villiger Mini, Villiger Original-Krumme, Villiger Shots

== Company structure and distribution ==
The Villiger Group comprises several national companies, including Villiger Söhne AG in Switzerland and Villiger Söhne GmbH in Germany. Distribution is carried out worldwide through the Group’s own distribution companies in key markets such as the United States and France, and through qualified importers elsewhere. The company is active in a number of markets, with significant presence in Switzerland, Germany, Spain and the United States.

== Flagship store ==
"The World of Cigars", Villiger’s flagship store, is located at Neuengasse 15/9 in Bern, Switzerland. It was opened in 2015 after Villiger took over the former Küttel Tobacco shop in Bern and converted it into its first flagship store. The store features a range of cigars including international brands such as Habanos, a variety of accessories, and a selection of spirits. Additionally, it is listed as a retailer of selected cigars from Cuba, Nicaragua, Brazil, Honduras and the Dominican Republic.
