= Liberal Party of Geneva =

Liberal Party of Geneva French: Parti Libéral Genevois
- Leader: Mark Muller
- Founded: 1913
- Dissolved: 30 May 2011
- Merged into: FDP.The Liberals
- Ideology: Conservative liberalism
- Political position: Centre-right
- National affiliation: Liberal Party of Switzerland
- Colours: Blue
- Grand Council of Geneva: 20 / 100

Website
- www.liberal-ge.ch

The Liberal Party of Geneva (French: Parti Libéral Genevois), abbreviated PLG, was a classical liberal political party in the Canton of Geneva. It was the cantonal branch of the Liberal Party of Switzerland until 1 January 2009, when the federal party merged with the Free Democratic Party to form FDP.The Liberals. On 30 May 2011, the party merged with the Radical Party of Geneva – the Free Democrats' cantonal branch – to form a single cantonal branch of the FDP.

It was the largest political party in the canton, holding twenty seats on the Grand Council at its dissolution. It participated in the centre-right 'Entente', with the Radicals and the Christian Democrats. At the last legislative election, these three parties won 42 of the 100 seats on the council. Pierre Muller was a member of the Liberal Party.

During the November 2005 elections for the Conseil d'Etat, two candidates from the Liberal Party were competing. While Mark Muller was elected, the other candidate, Micheline Spoerri, who was already a member of the Conseil d'Etat, did not get elected. In the 2009 Grand Council election, the party lost three seats, but remained the largest party in the canton, with a total of twenty seats.
