= Pierre Muller =

Swiss politician (1952–2022)

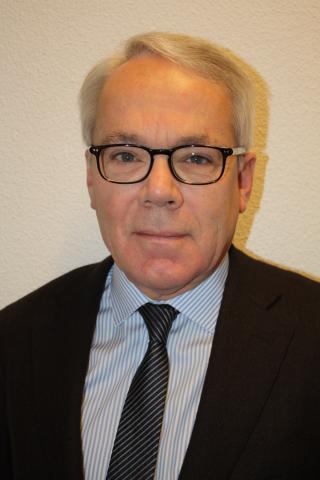
Pierre Muller, 2012

Pierre Muller (1952 – 9 September 2022) was a Swiss politician who was a member of the government of the City of Geneva (conseil administratif) from 1995. As such, he held the rotating function of mayor (maire) for the years 1999–2000 and 2004–2005.

Muller was a member of the Parti Libéral Genevois. He died on 9 September 2022, at the age of 70.
