= Valiant Bank =

Swiss bank

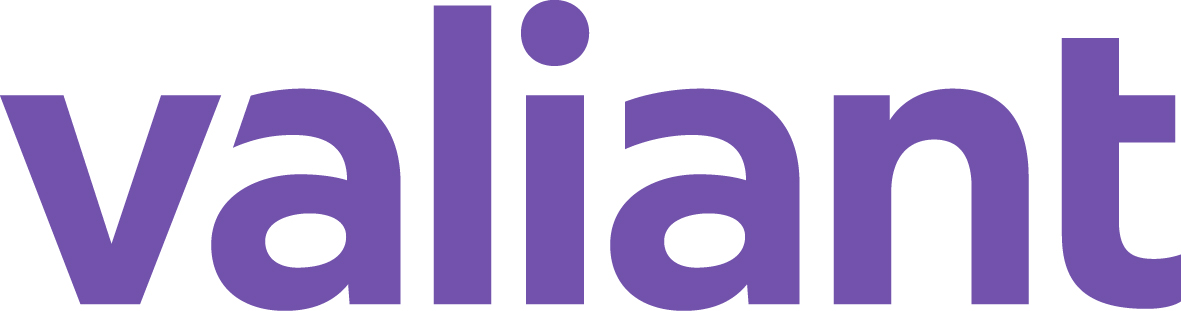
- Native name: Valiant Bank AG
- Company type: Public
- Number of locations: 100 (2022)
- Area served: Aargau, Basel-Land, Basel-Stadt, Bern, Fribourg, Jura, Lucerne, Neuchâtel, Schaffhausen, Solothurn, St. Gallen, Thurgau, Vaud, Zug, Zurich
- Key people: Ewald Burgener (CEO)
- Total assets: CHF 36.5 billion (2022)
- Number of employees: 1,110+ (2022)
- Website: valiant.ch (in German)

Valiant Bank is a Swiss national banking and financial services corporation headquartered in Bern, Switzerland. Founded in 1997 through the merger of several regional banks it currently employs 1,100+ employees (2022) with 380,000 clients and an AUM of CHF 36.5 billion.
