= Esther Alder =

Swiss politician

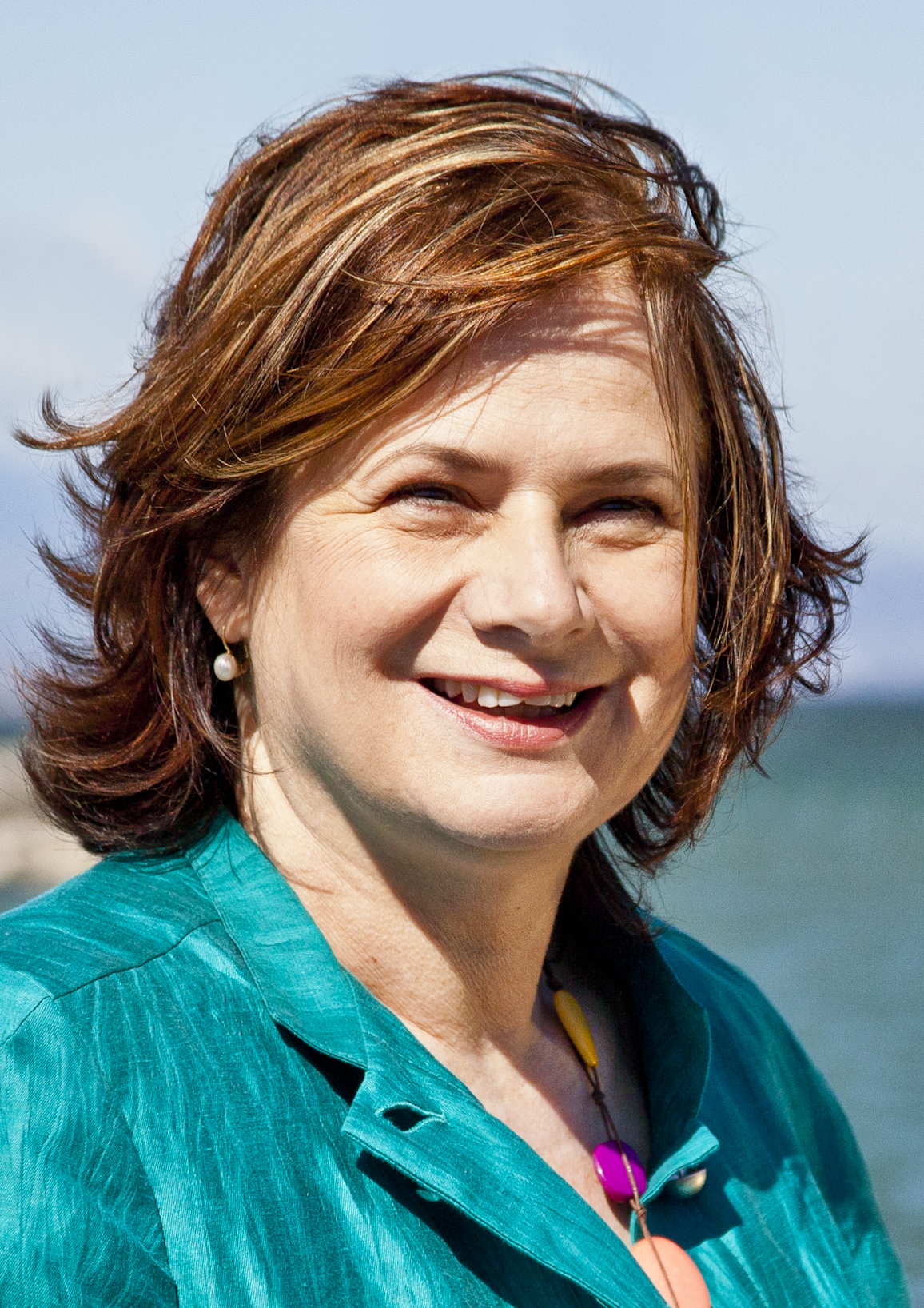
- Esther Alder in 2014.

Mayor of Geneva
- In office 1 June 2015 – 31 May 2016
- Preceded by: Sami Kanaan

Personal details
- Born: 1958 (age 67–68) Solothurn, Switzerland
- Party: Green Party
- Occupation: Politician
- Website: estheralder.blog.tdg.ch

Esther Alder (born 1958 in Solothurn) is a Swiss politician. She has served on the City Council of Geneva from 2011 to 2020 and was the mayor of Geneva for the 2015–2016 term. She is a member of the Green Party.

== Biography ==
Having moved to Geneva at nine years old, Alder continued her education there, which she had started in the canton of Solothurn. She obtained a diploma in administration and development and a HES social worker diploma from the University of Geneva.

She worked as an after-school activities coordinator from 1977 to 1983. In 1986, she became a social worker at Le Caré, a solidarity center providing support to people facing financial and personal difficulties. The same year, she joined Carrefour-Rue, an association assisting homeless and disadvantaged people, as an educator.

In 1990, she became co-director of Carrefour-Rue and took over its leadership in 2010. She also worked as a social worker in the cantonal Department of Public Education. There, she created and managed the social service for reception and integration classes at the upper secondary level. In 2010, the Federal Office of Justice appointed her as an expert to the National Commission for the Prevention of Torture.

She is the mother of two children.

== Political background ==
In 1995 Esther Alder was elected to the legislative municipal council of the city of Geneva. She left the assembly in 1997 after being elected deputy to the Grand Council of Geneva, a position she held for twelve years. She was elected to the administrative council of Geneva in 2011 where she headed the Department of Social Cohesion and Solidarity. Although she was supposed to become a mayor during the 2014–2015 legislative year, she chose to give up the position to her Socialist colleague Sami Kanaan. In Esther's opinion it made more sense for the head of the Department of Culture and Sports to serve as mayor during a year that was expected to be mainly cultural due to the celebrations marking the bicentennial of Geneva's entry into the Swiss Confederation.

Esther Alder ran again in the 2015 municipal elections. She was re-elected to the Administrative Council along with the four other incumbents. She became Mayor of Geneva on 1 June 2015. In that capacity, she participated in the Summit of Local Elected Officials for Climate in Paris during COP21.

During her term, a controversy arose over reimbursement of taxi expenses claimed by members of the Geneva executive. Reports indicated that her taxi expenses were high and increasing. On 13 February 2019, she announced that she would not seek a third term in the executive. She denied any link between her decision and the expense controversy.

=== Assessment of mandates on the Administrative Council ===
Esther Alder's record is considered positive by both the left and the right of the political spectrum. The press noted her openness to dialogue, determination, and constructive approach. It also notes her ability to follow through on her convictions. She was described as discreet, collegial, and effective.

Her policies in favor of homeless and disadvantaged people were particularly highlighted. In 2012, the winter shelter capacity for homeless people was doubled, and funding for the program was made permanent. During her tenure, 1,000 childcare places were created over ten years. Resources for after-school programs were increased. Information points for residents were expanded. Transitional housing units for vulnerable individuals were created. A back-to-school allowance for low-income families was introduced in 2013. Neighborhood facilities were renovated, and policies for older residents were developed.

=== Other initiatives ===
She launched an information campaign encouraging low-income pensioners to apply for municipal supplementary benefits to which they were entitled.

In autumn 2016, she established four local social service offices across the city. Following the publication of social profiles of neighborhoods, residents and associations were consulted through social forums. These consultations led to action plans proposing short- and medium-term projects.

She also created outdoor fitness installations known as Proxisport to promote physical activity through accessible public equipment.
