= Outline of Geneva =

City in Switzerland

Coat of arms of Geneva

The following outline is provided as an overview of and topical guide to Geneva:

Geneva (/dʒɪˈniːvə/ jin-EE-və; French: Genève [ʒ(ə)nɛv] ) is the second-most populous city in Switzerland and the most populous in French-speaking Romandy. Situated in the southwest of the country, where the Rhône leaves Lake Geneva, it is the capital of the Republic and Canton of Geneva. Geneva is a global city, an international financial centre, and a worldwide centre for diplomacy, which has led to it being called the "Peace Capital".

== General reference ==
- Pronunciation: English: /dʒɪˈniːvə/, Franco-Provençal: [dzəˈnɛva]; French: Genève [ʒənɛv]; German: Genf [ɡɛnf]; Italian: Ginevra [dʒiˈneːvra]; Romansh: Genevra
- Common English name(s): Geneva
- Official English name(s): Geneva
- Adjectival(s): Genevan, Genevese
- Demonym(s): Genevan, Genevese

== Geography of Geneva ==
Geography of Geneva

- Geneva is:
  - a city
  - capital of the Canton of Geneva
- Population of Geneva: 198,979
- Area of Geneva: 15.92 km^{2} (6.15 sq mi)
- Atlas of Geneva

Geneva
- Location within Switzerland
- Coordinates: 46°12′N 6°09′E

=== Location of Geneva ===
- Geneva is situated within the following regions:
  - Northern Hemisphere and Eastern Hemisphere
    - Eurasia
      - Europe (outline)
        - Central Europe
          - Switzerland (outline)
            - Canton of Geneva
              - Grand Genève
- Time zone(s):
  - Central European Time (UTC+01)
  - In Summer (DST): Central European Summer Time (UTC+02)

=== Environment of Geneva ===
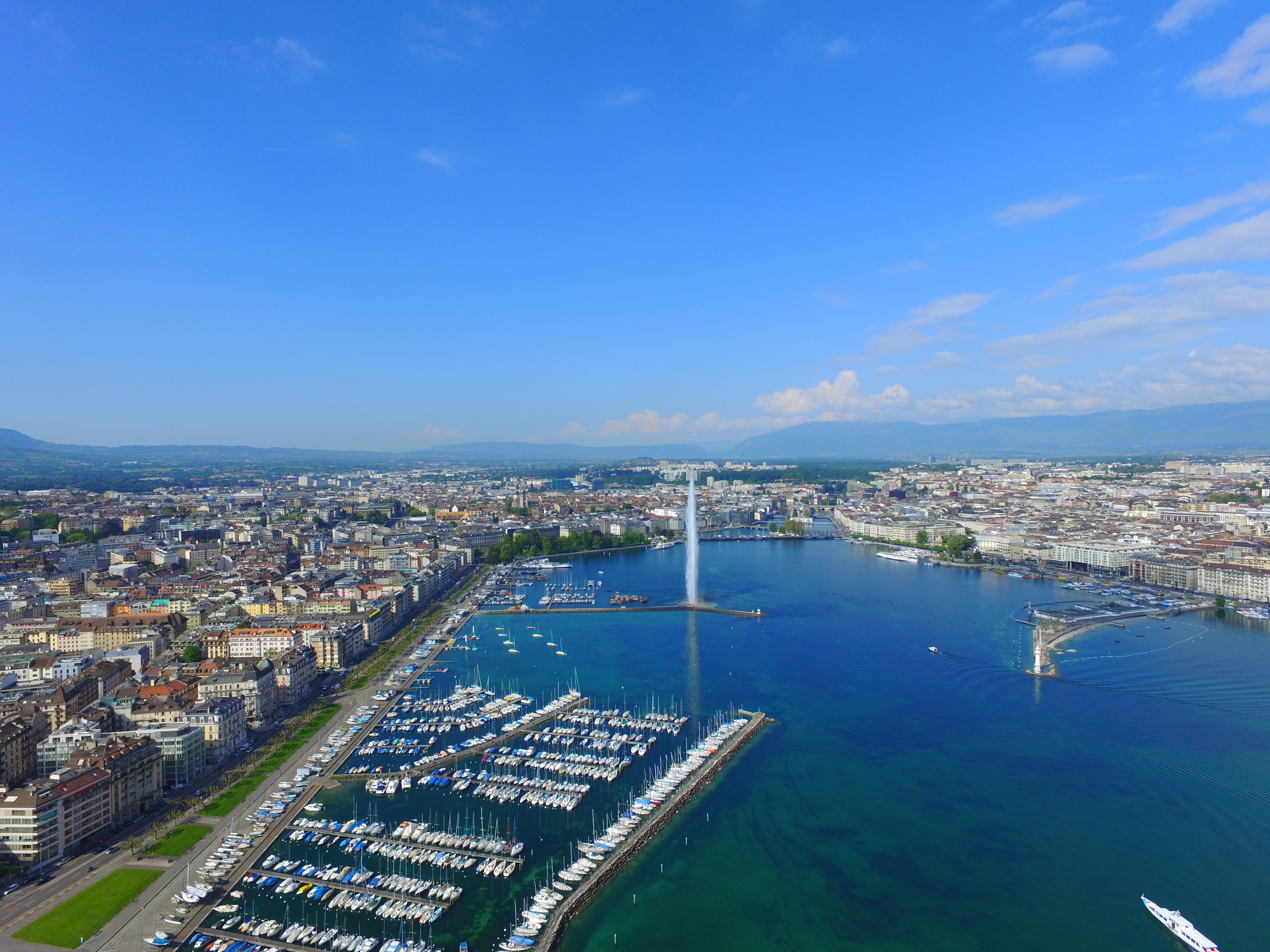
Lake Geneva

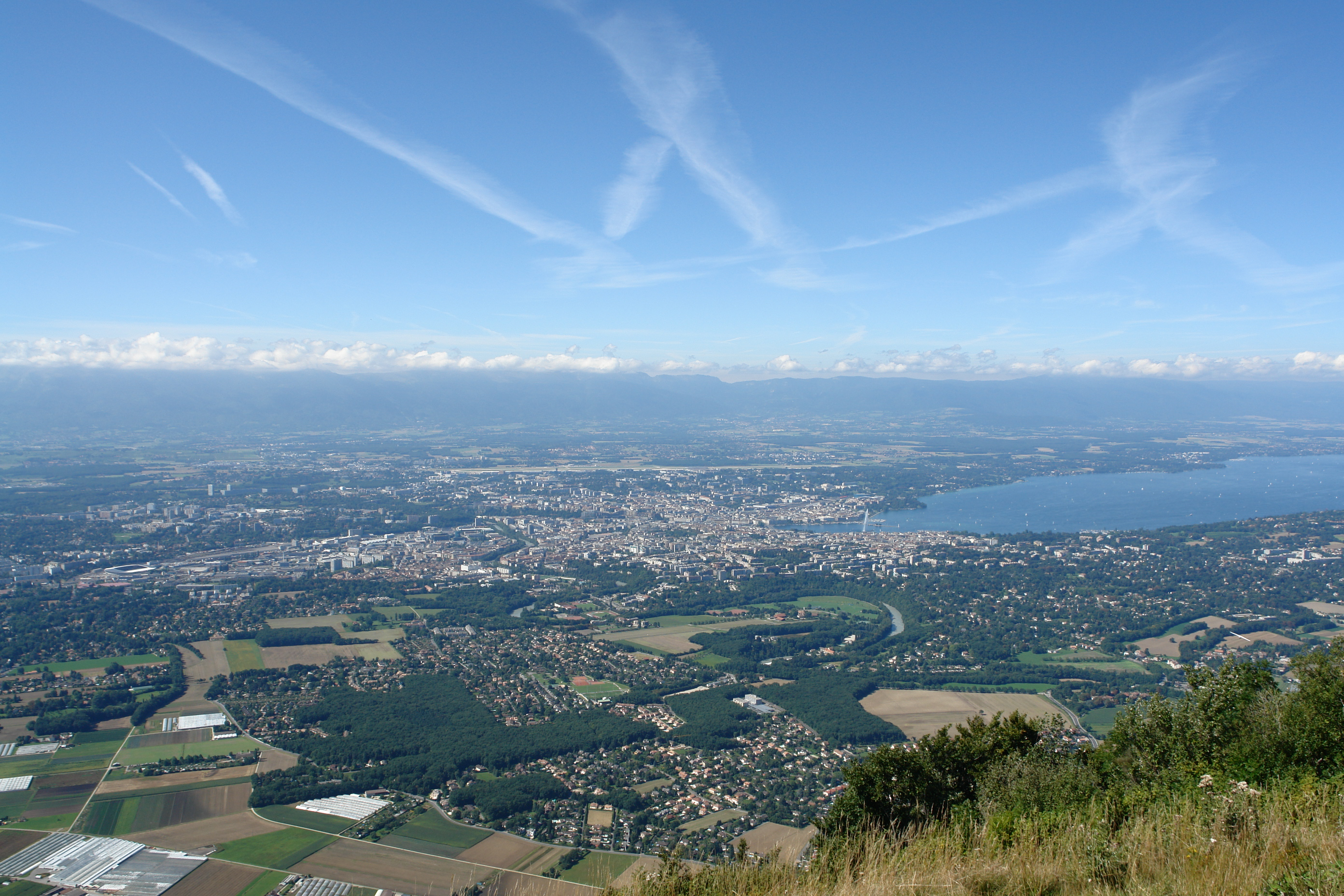
The Geneva area seen from the Salève in France

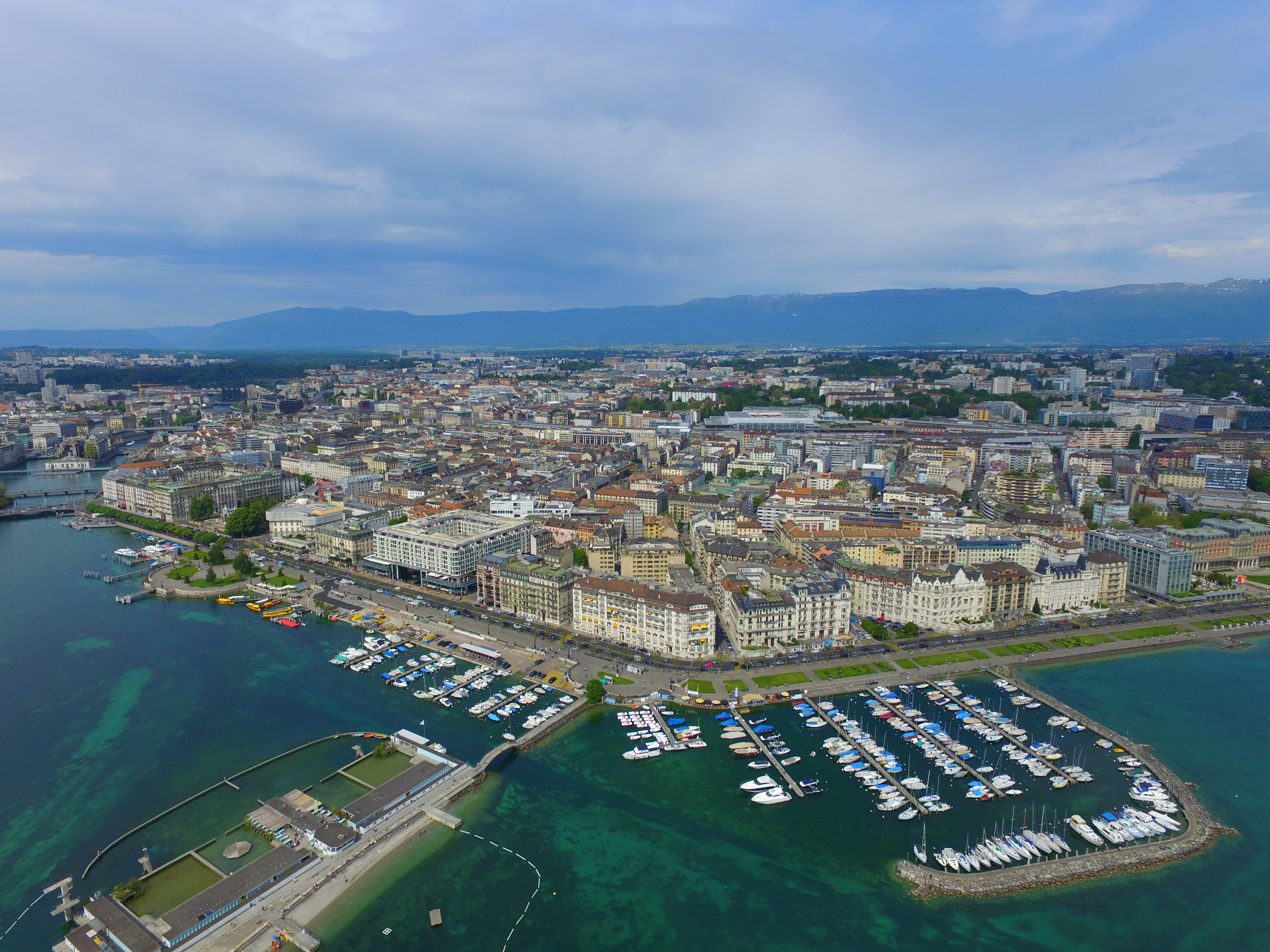
Lakefront of Geneva

- Climate of Geneva

==== Natural geographic features of Geneva ====
- Islands in Geneva
  - Île Rousseau
- Lakes in Geneva
  - Lake Geneva
- Rivers in Geneva
  - Arve
  - Rhône
- Rocks in Geneva
  - Pierres du Niton

=== Areas of Geneva ===
==== Districts of Geneva ====
- Servette

==== Neighborhoods in Geneva ====
- Champel
- Plainpalais

=== Locations in Geneva ===
- Tourist attractions in Geneva
  - Museums in Geneva
  - Shopping areas and markets
  - World Heritage Sites in Geneva

==== Bridges in Geneva ====
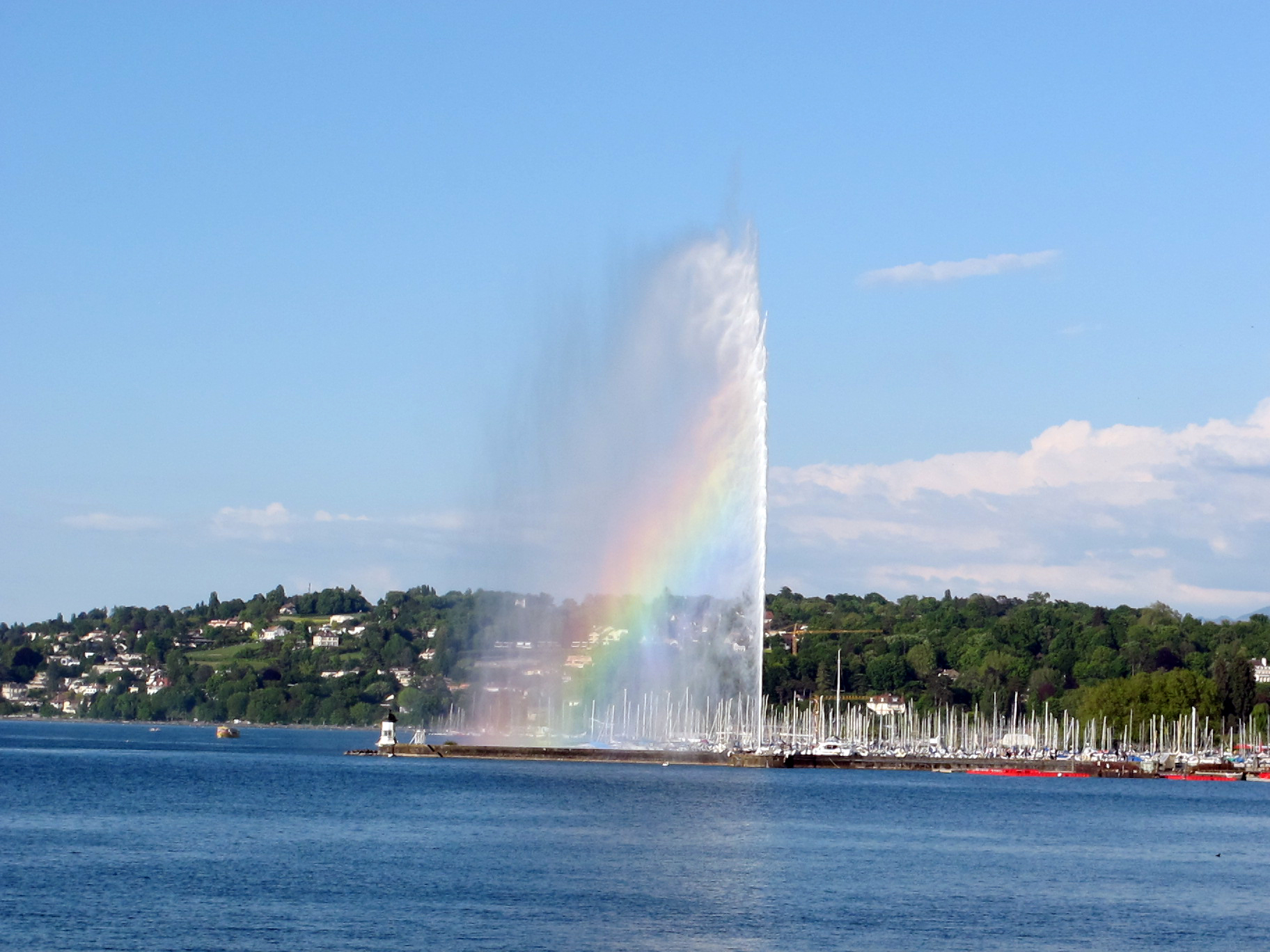
The Jet d'Eau

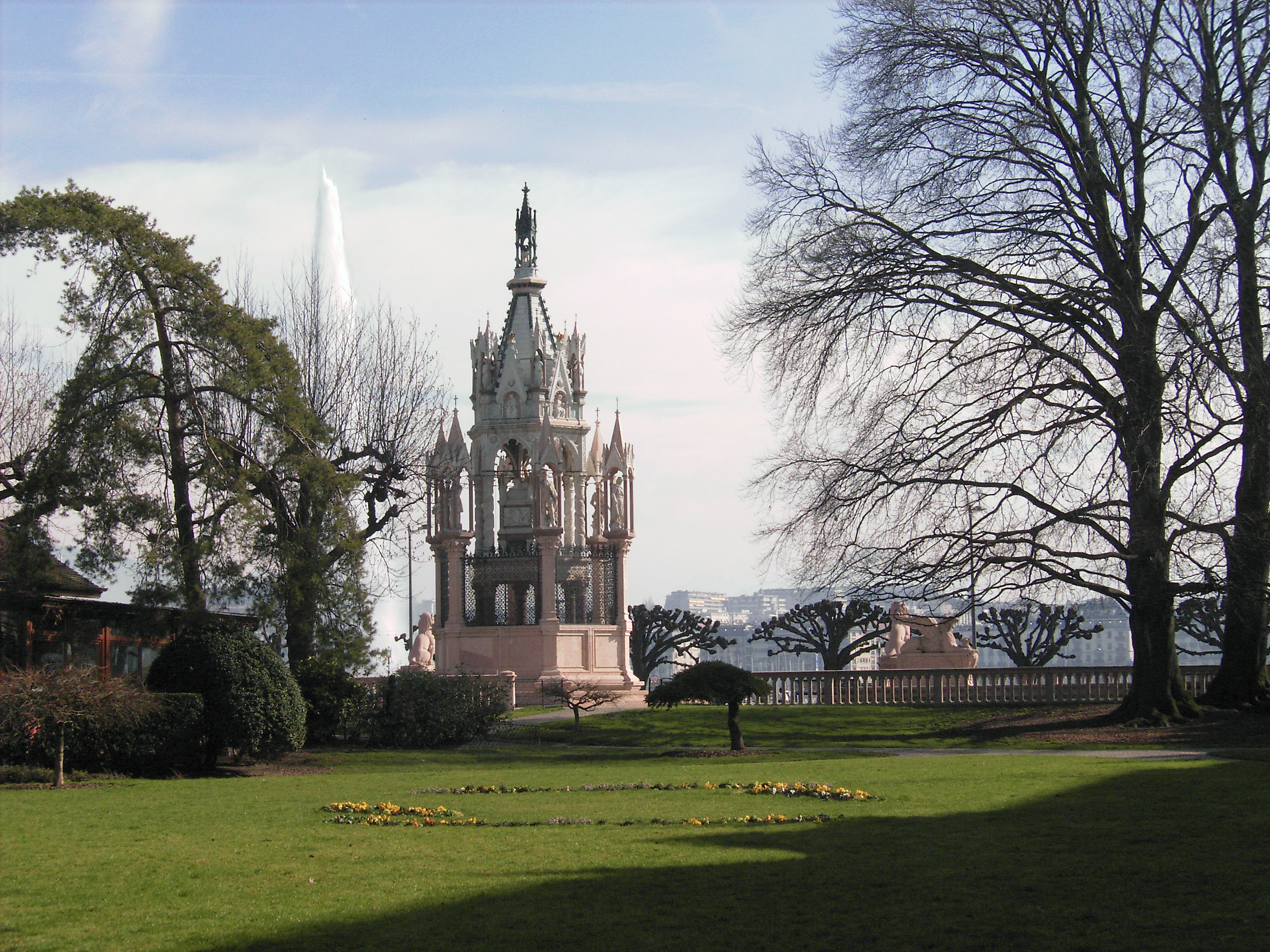
The Brunswick Monument

- Hans Wilsdorf Bridge

==== Cultural and exhibition centres in Geneva ====
- Centre d'Art Contemporain Genève
- Palexpo

==== Fountains in Geneva ====
- Jet d'Eau

==== Monuments and memorials in Geneva ====
- Brunswick Monument
- Celestial Sphere Woodrow Wilson Memorial
- Reformation Wall

==== Museums and art galleries in Geneva ====
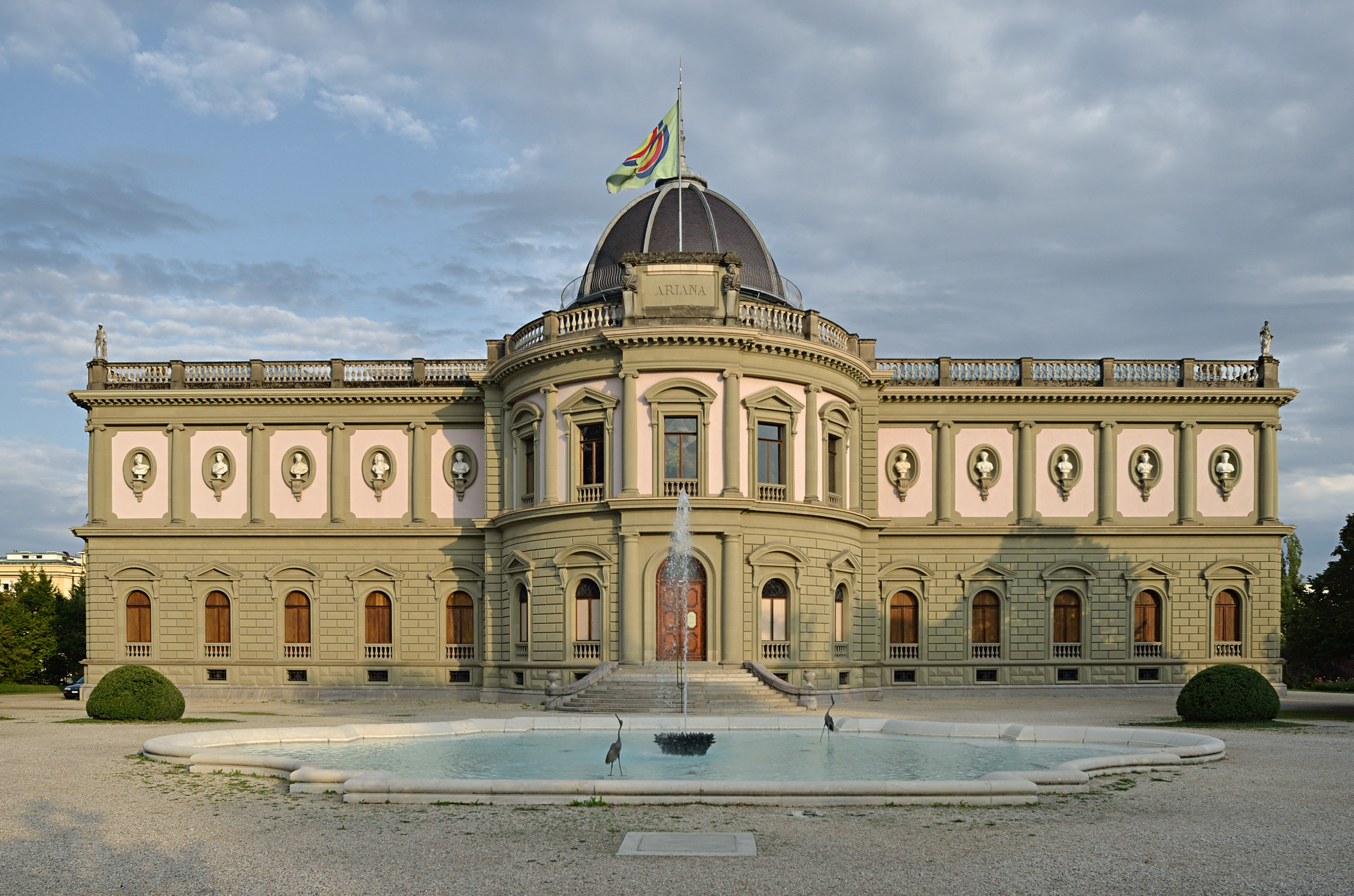
Musée Ariana

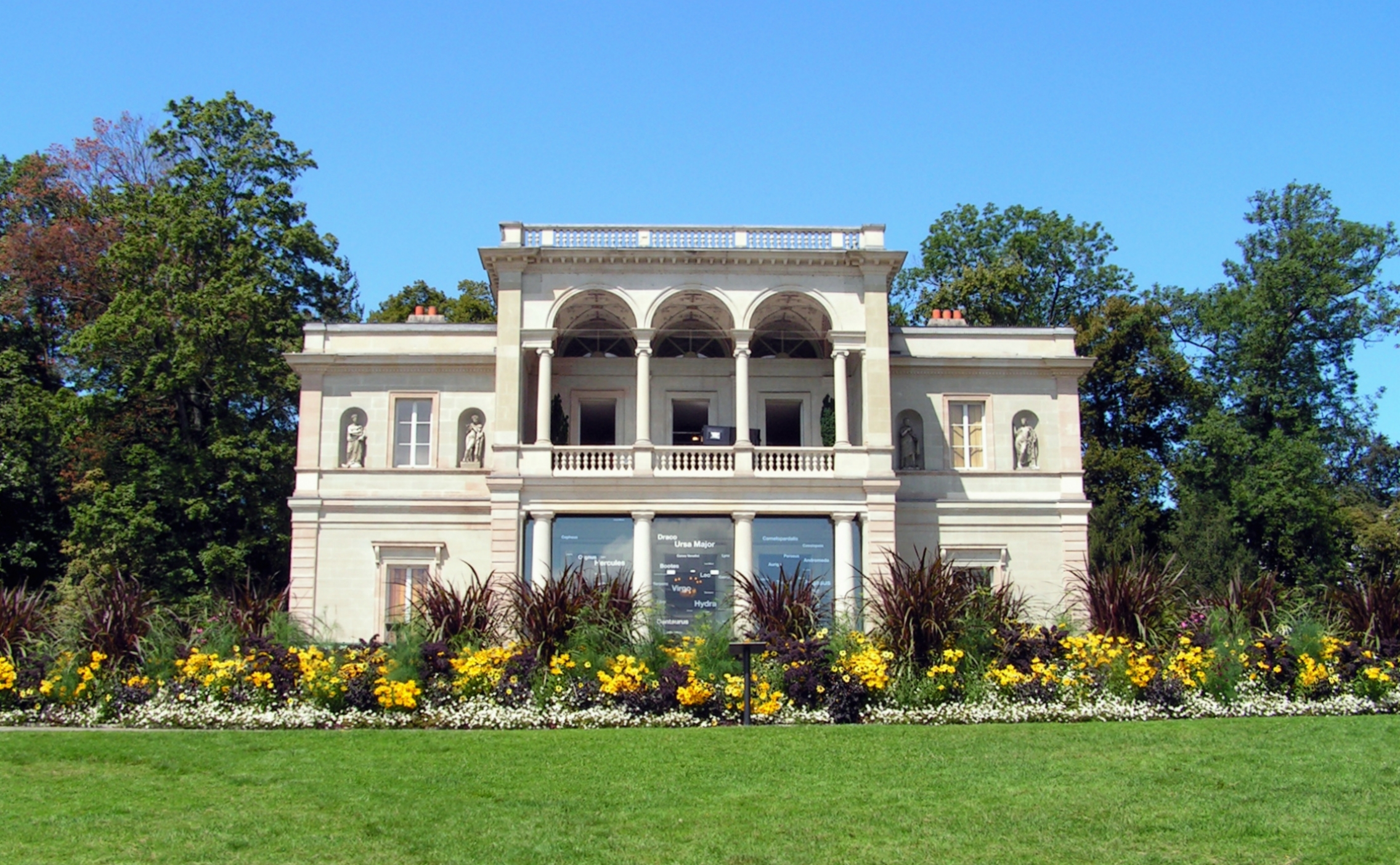
Musée d'histoire des sciences de la Ville de Genève

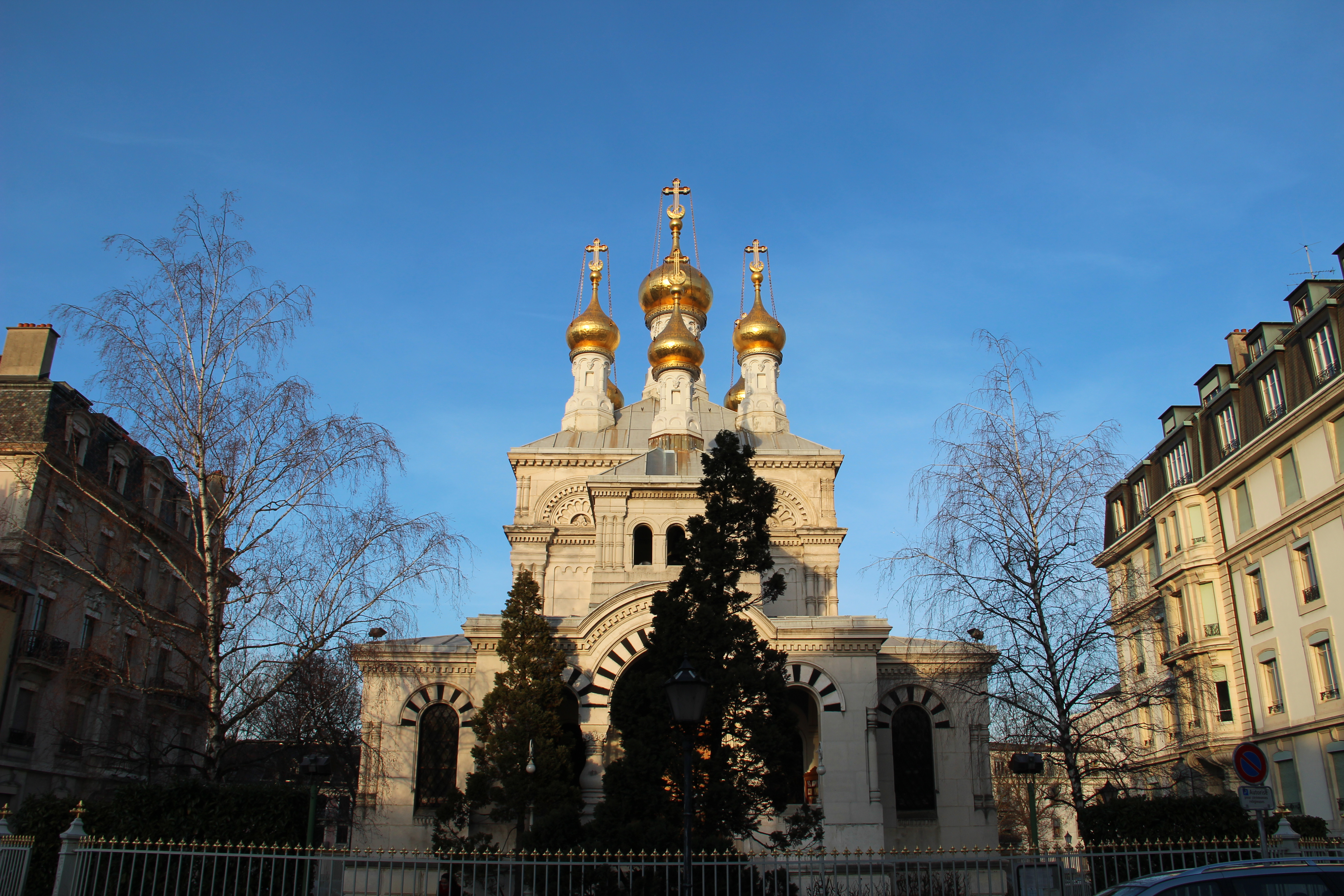
The Russian Church

Museums in Geneva

- Barbier-Mueller Museum
- Institut et Musée Voltaire
- International Red Cross and Red Crescent Museum
- MAMCO
- Musée Ariana
- Musée d'Art et d'Histoire
- Musée d'ethnographie de Genève
- Musée d'histoire des sciences
- Musée Rath
- Natural History Museum

==== Palaces and villas in Geneva ====
- Les Délices
- Palais Wilson

==== Parks and gardens in Geneva ====
- Geneva Botanical Garden
- Jardin Anglais
  - L'horloge fleurie
- Parc des Eaux Vives
- Parc La Grange

==== Public squares in Geneva ====
- Place du Bourg-de-Four

==== Religious buildings in Geneva ====
- Basilica of Our Lady of Geneva
- Calvin Auditory
- Evangelical Free Church of Geneva
- Russian Church
- St. Pierre Cathedral

==== Secular buildings in Geneva ====
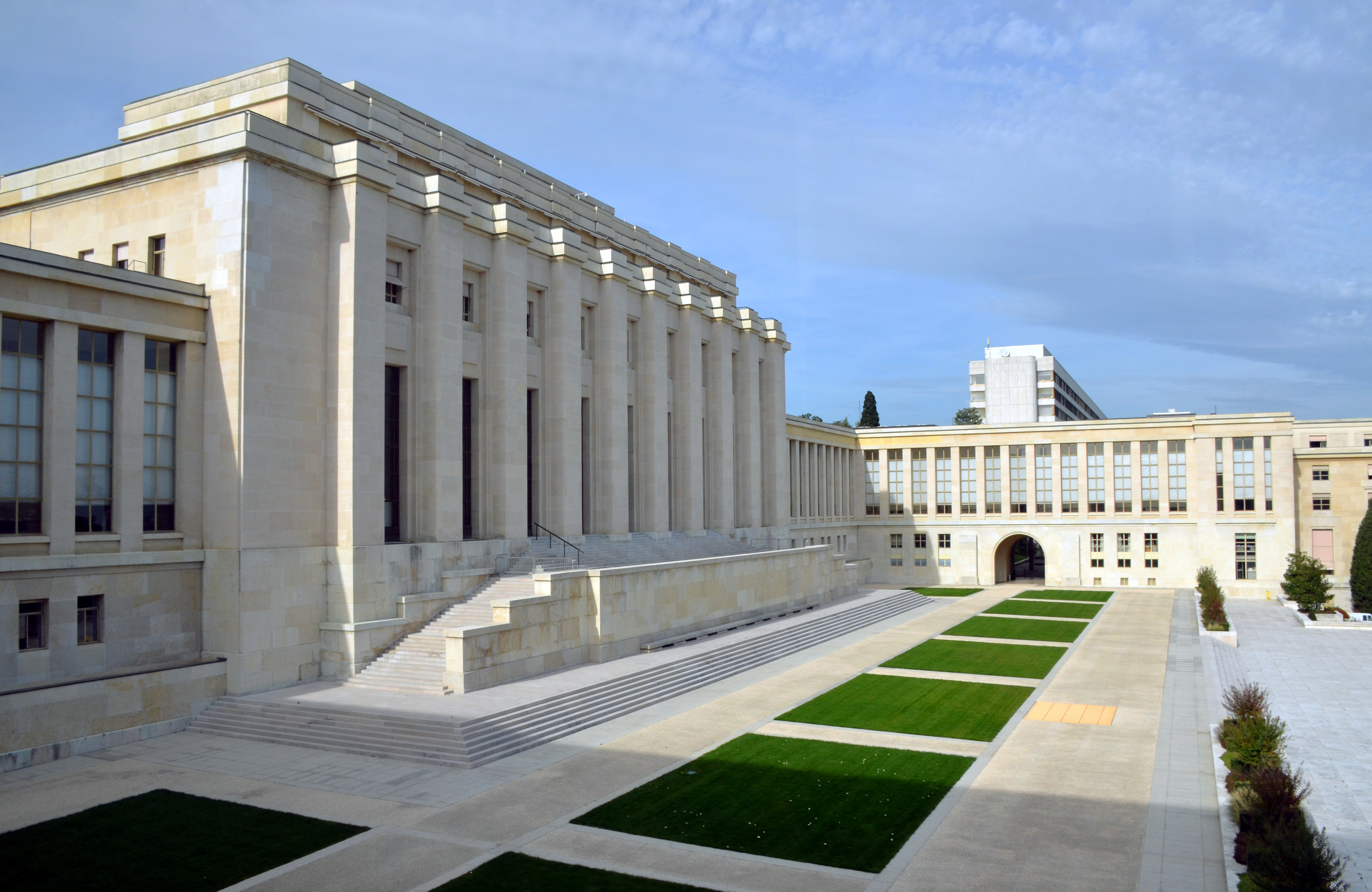
The Palace of Nations

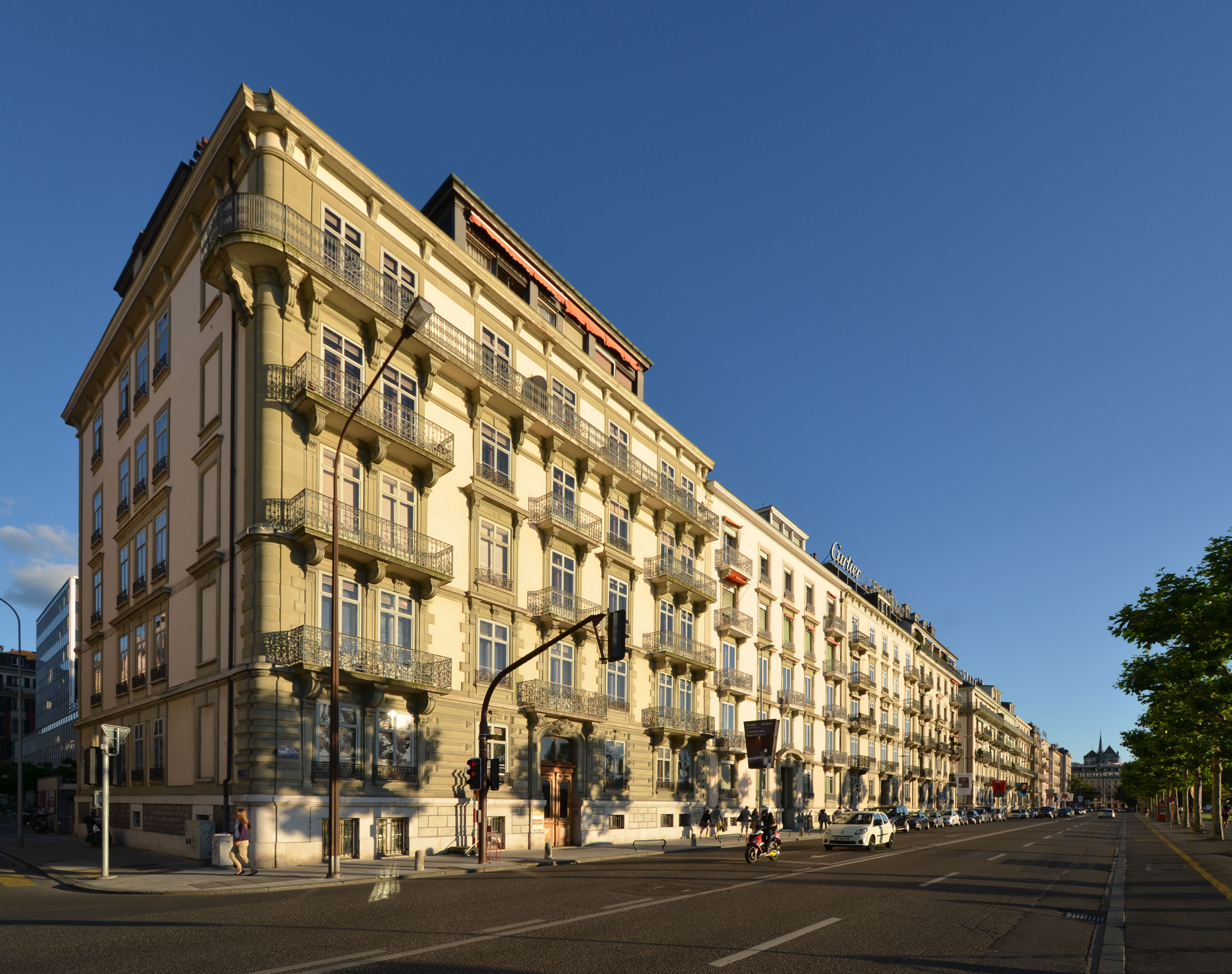
Quai Gustave-Ador

- Bâtiment des Forces motrices
- Centre William Rappard
- Immeuble Clarté
- Maison de la paix
- Palace of Nations
- RHINO

==== Streets in Geneva ====
- Quai Gustave-Ador
  - Port-Noir
- Rue de Berne

==== Theatres in Geneva ====
- Grand Théâtre de Genève
- Théâtre de Neuve

=== Demographics of Geneva ===
Demographics of Geneva

== Government and politics of Geneva ==
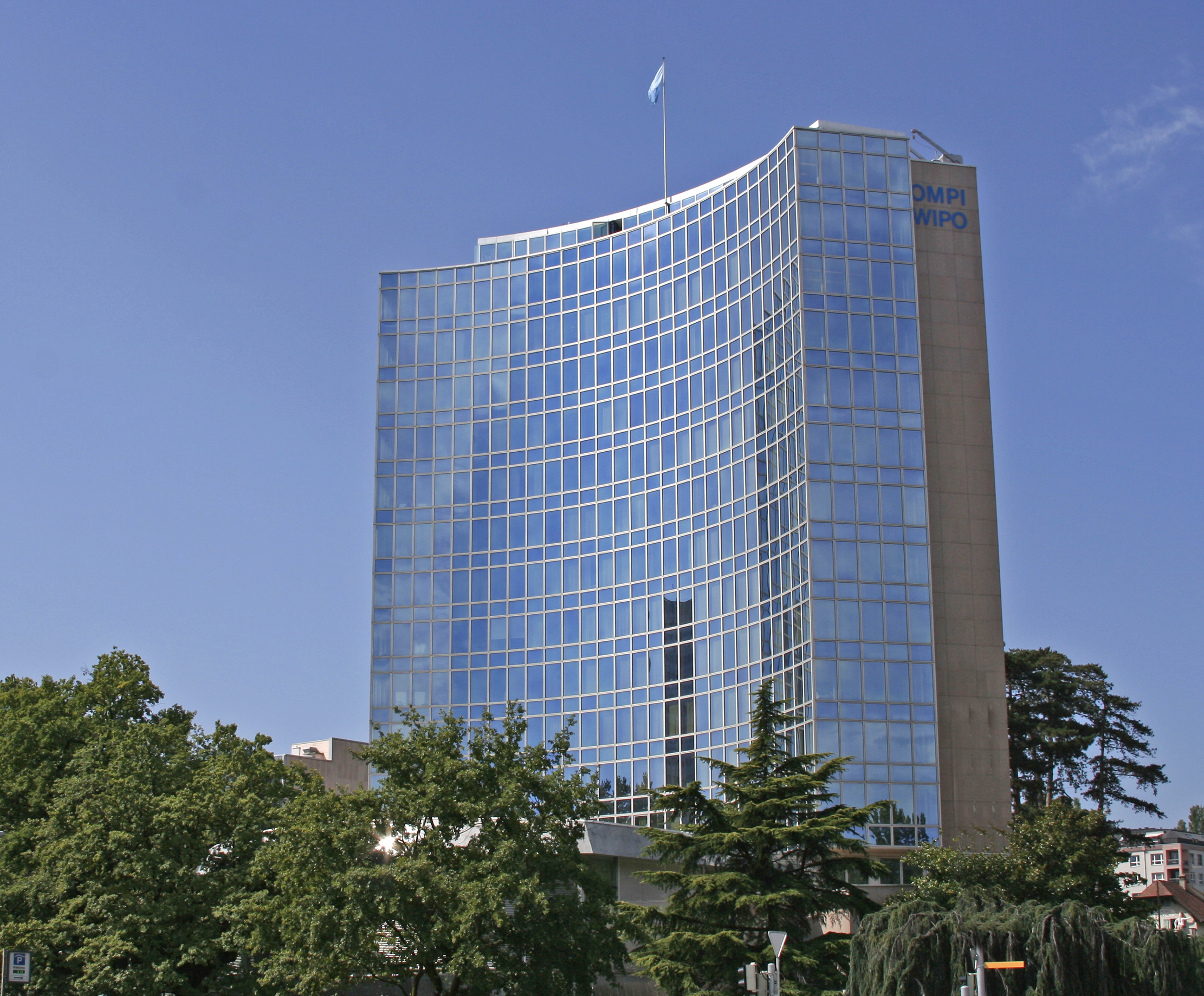
The World Intellectual Property Organization (WIPO) headquarters

Politics of Geneva

- Mayors of Geneva

=== International organizations based in Geneva ===
- International organizations based in Geneva
  - International Committee of the Red Cross
  - International Organization for Standardization
  - International Telecommunication Union
  - United Nations Office at Geneva
  - World Intellectual Property Organization

=== Law and order in Geneva ===
- Crime in Geneva

== History of Geneva ==
History of Geneva

=== History of Geneva, by period or event ===
Timeline of Geneva

- Beginnings and early Middle Ages
  - Geneva first appears in history as an Allobrogian border town.
- Geneva during the 18th century
- Geneva during the 19th century
  - Geneva flourished in the 19th and 20th centuries, becoming the seat of many international organizations.
- Geneva during the 20th century

=== History of Geneva, by subject ===
- L'Escalade
- Geneva Revolution of 1782

== Culture of Geneva ==
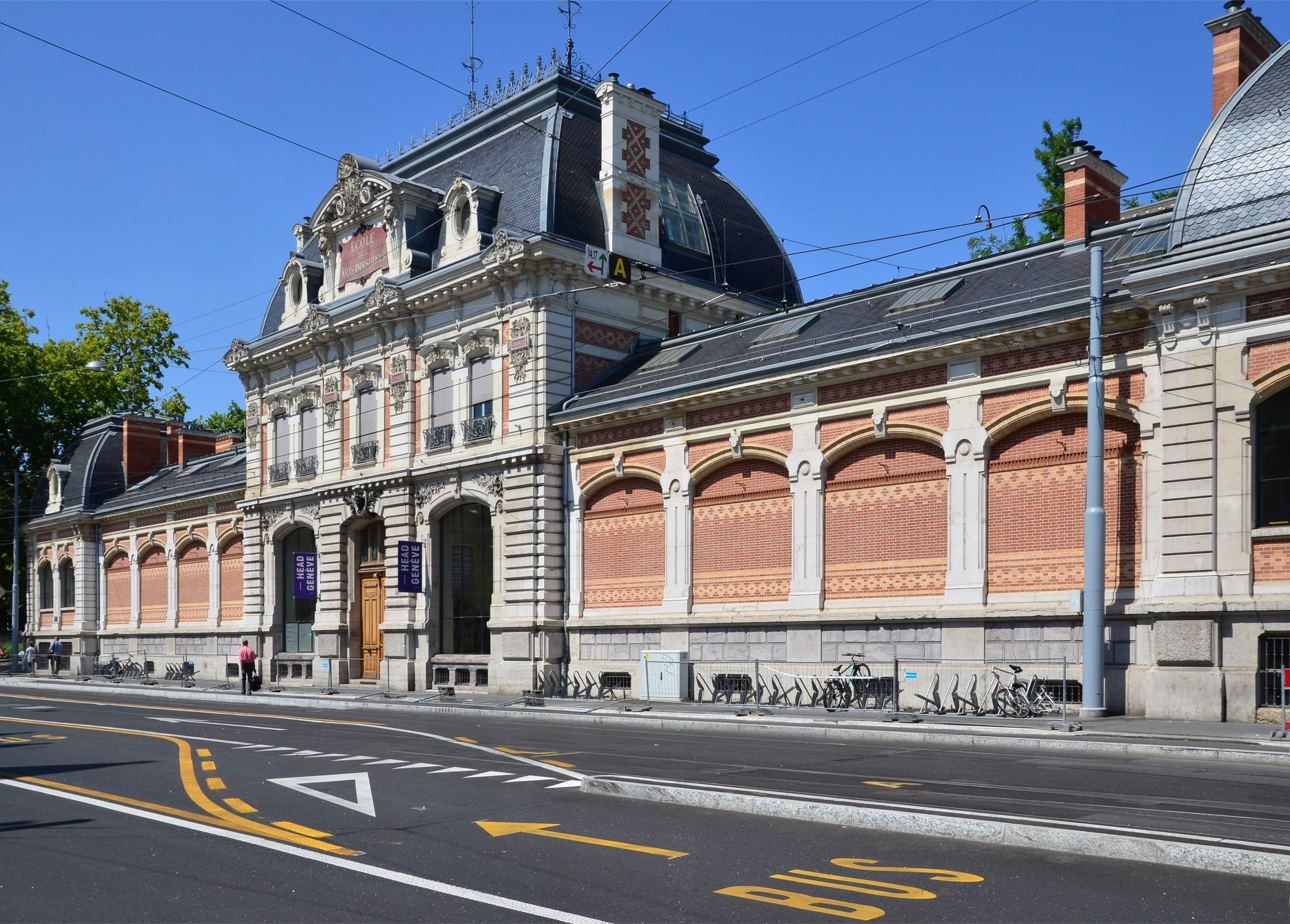
Former École des arts industriels building, a cultural property of national significance in Geneva

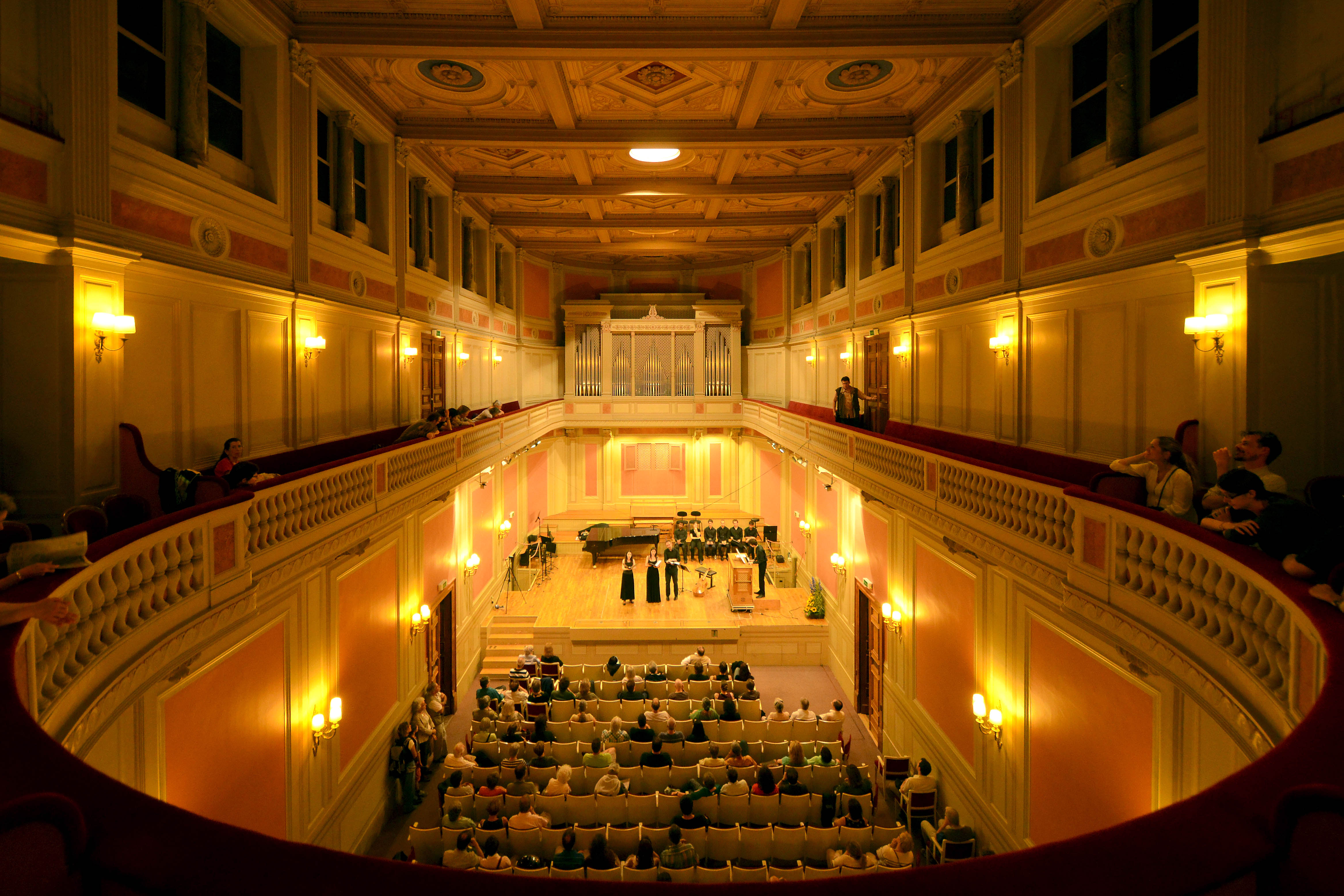
Interior of Conservatoire de Musique de Genève

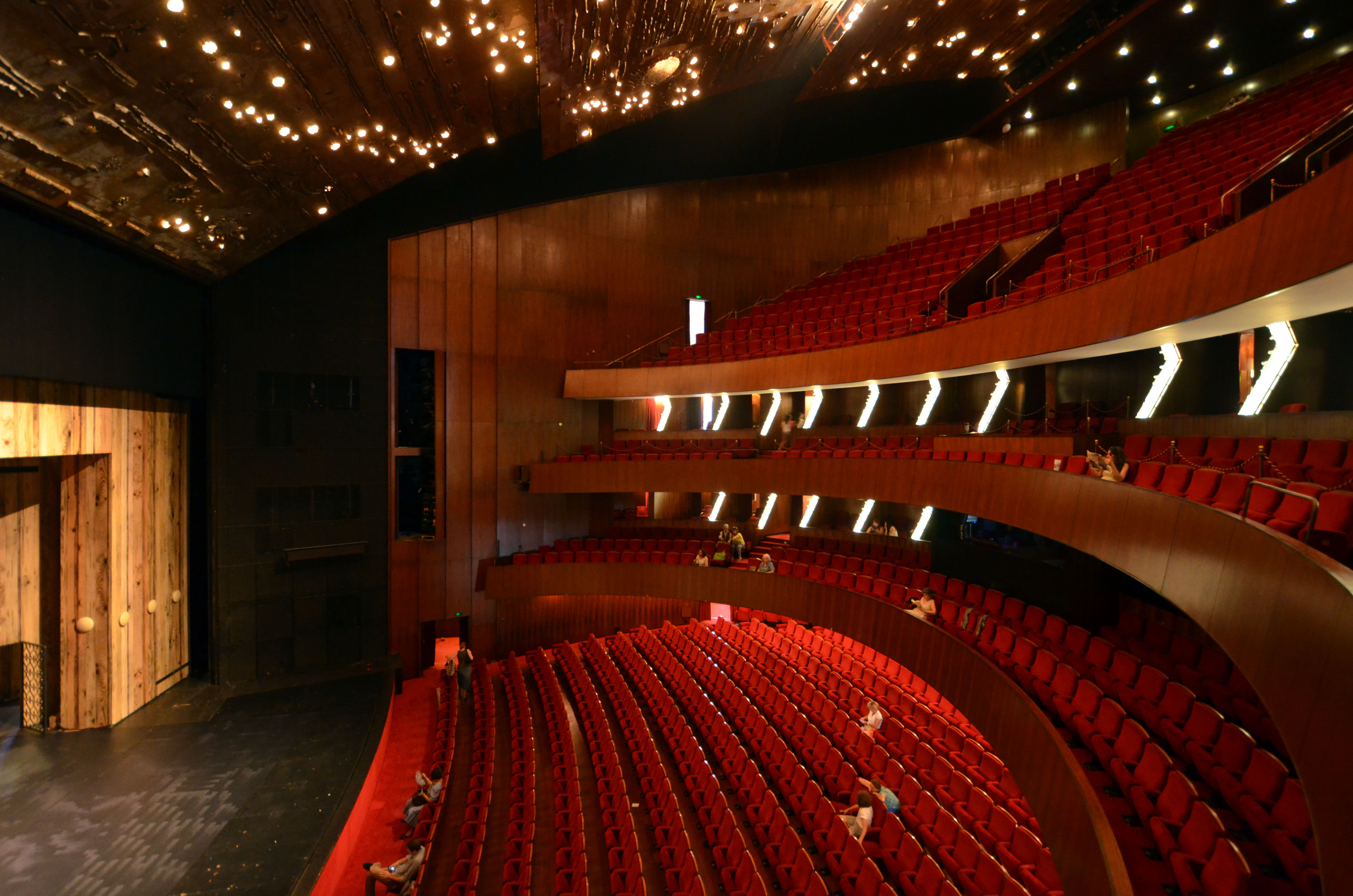
The auditorium of Grand Théâtre de Genève

Culture of Geneva

=== Arts in Geneva ===
==== Architecture of Geneva ====
- Cultural property of national significance in Switzerland: Geneva

==== Cinema of Geneva ====
- Geneva International Film Festival

==== Music of Geneva ====
- Music festivals and competitions in Geneva
  - Geneva International Music Competition
- Music schools in Geneva
  - Conservatoire de Musique de Genève
  - Geneva University of Music
- Music venues in Geneva
  - Victoria Hall
- Musical ensembles in Geneva
  - Ensemble Contrechamps
  - Geneva Camerata
  - Orchestre de chambre de Genève
  - Orchestre de la Suisse Romande
- Musicians from Geneva
  - Frank Martin

==== Visual arts of Geneva ====
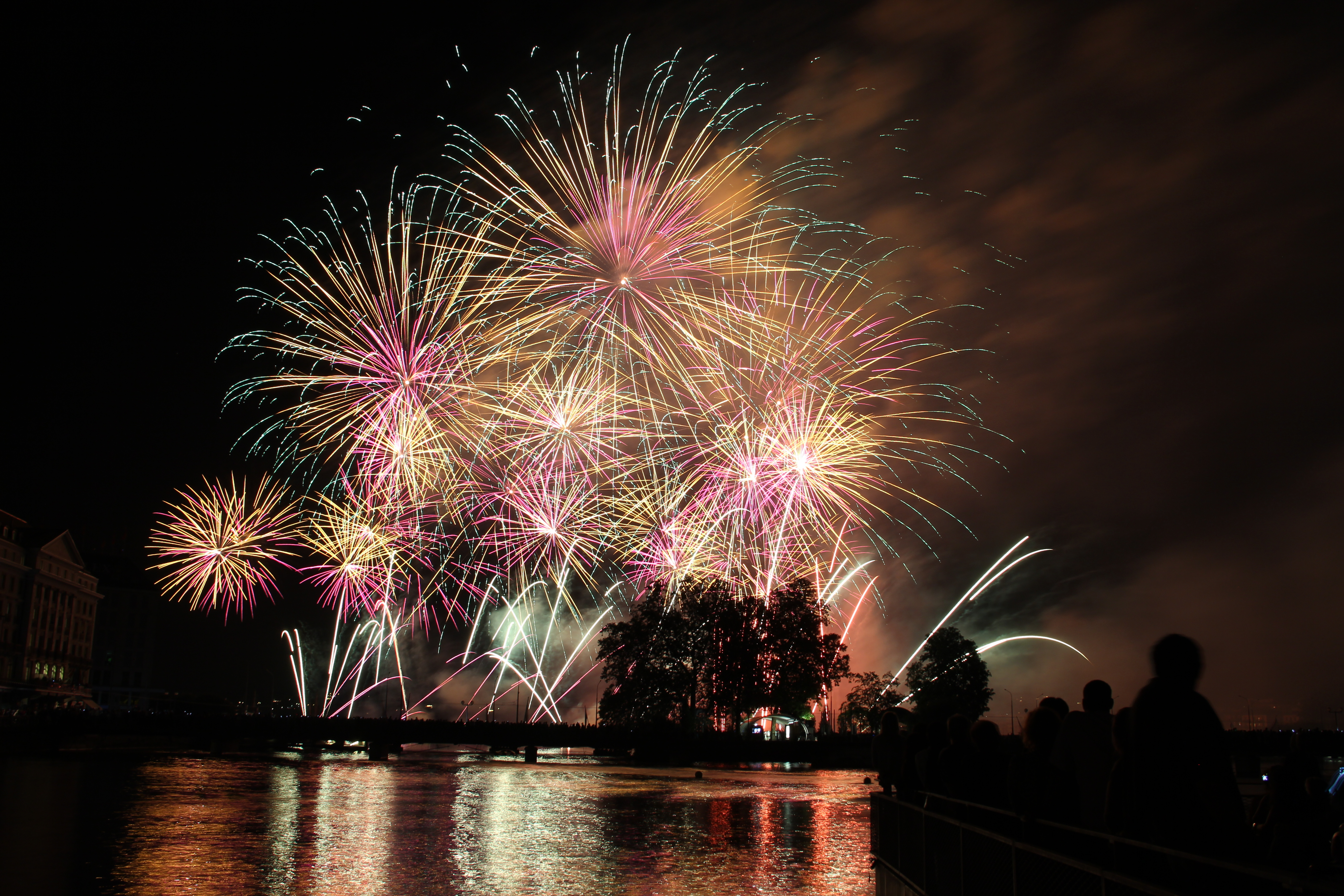
Fireworks at the Fêtes de Genève, 2012

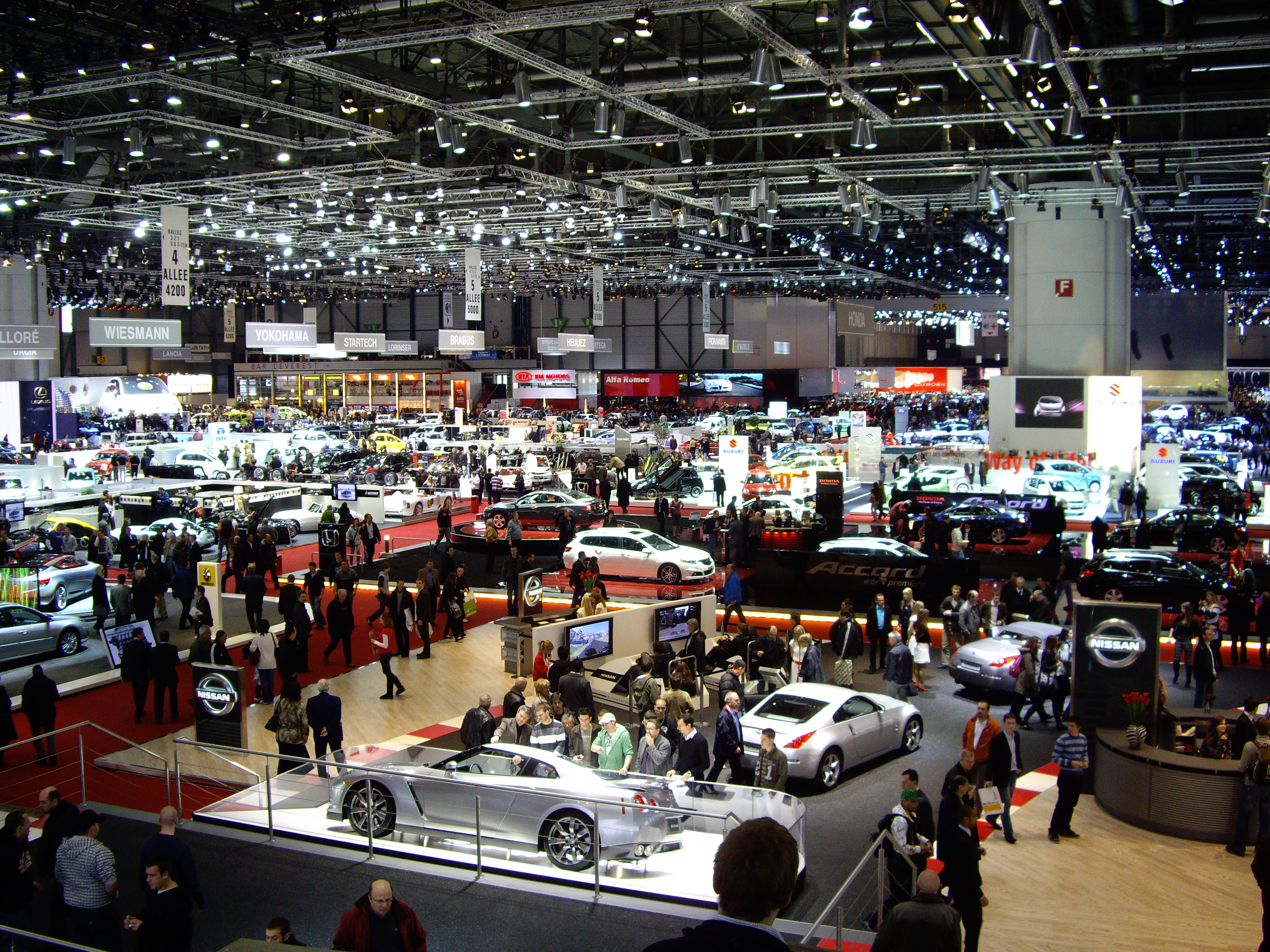
The Geneva Motor Show (2008)

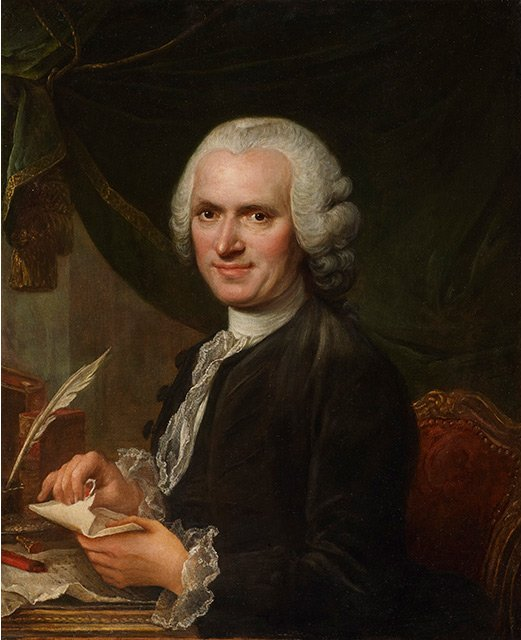
Jean-Jacques Rousseau, Genevan philosopher, writer, and composer of the 18th century

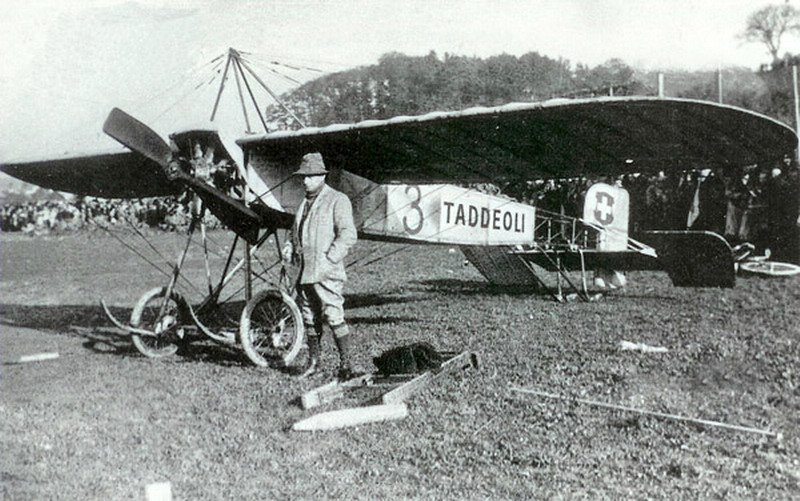
Émile Taddéoli, Swiss aviation pioneer born in Geneva in 1879

Public art in Geneva

- Celestial Sphere Woodrow Wilson Memorial

Events in Geneva

- Fêtes de Genève
- Geneva Motor Show

Languages of Geneva

- French language
- Franco-Provençal language

Media in Geneva

- Newspapers in Geneva
  - Le Courrier
  - Le Temps
  - Tribune de Genève
- Radio and television in Geneva
  - Radio Télévision Suisse

People from Geneva

- Pierre Prévost
- Jean-Jacques Rousseau
- Émile Taddéoli

Traditions and customs in Geneva

- Jeûne genevois
- L'Escalade

=== Religion in Geneva ===
Religion in Geneva

- Catholicism in Geneva
  - Roman Catholic Diocese of Lausanne, Geneva and Fribourg
- Islam in Geneva
  - Geneva Mosque
- Judaism in Geneva
  - Hekhal Haness Synagogue

=== Sports in Geneva ===
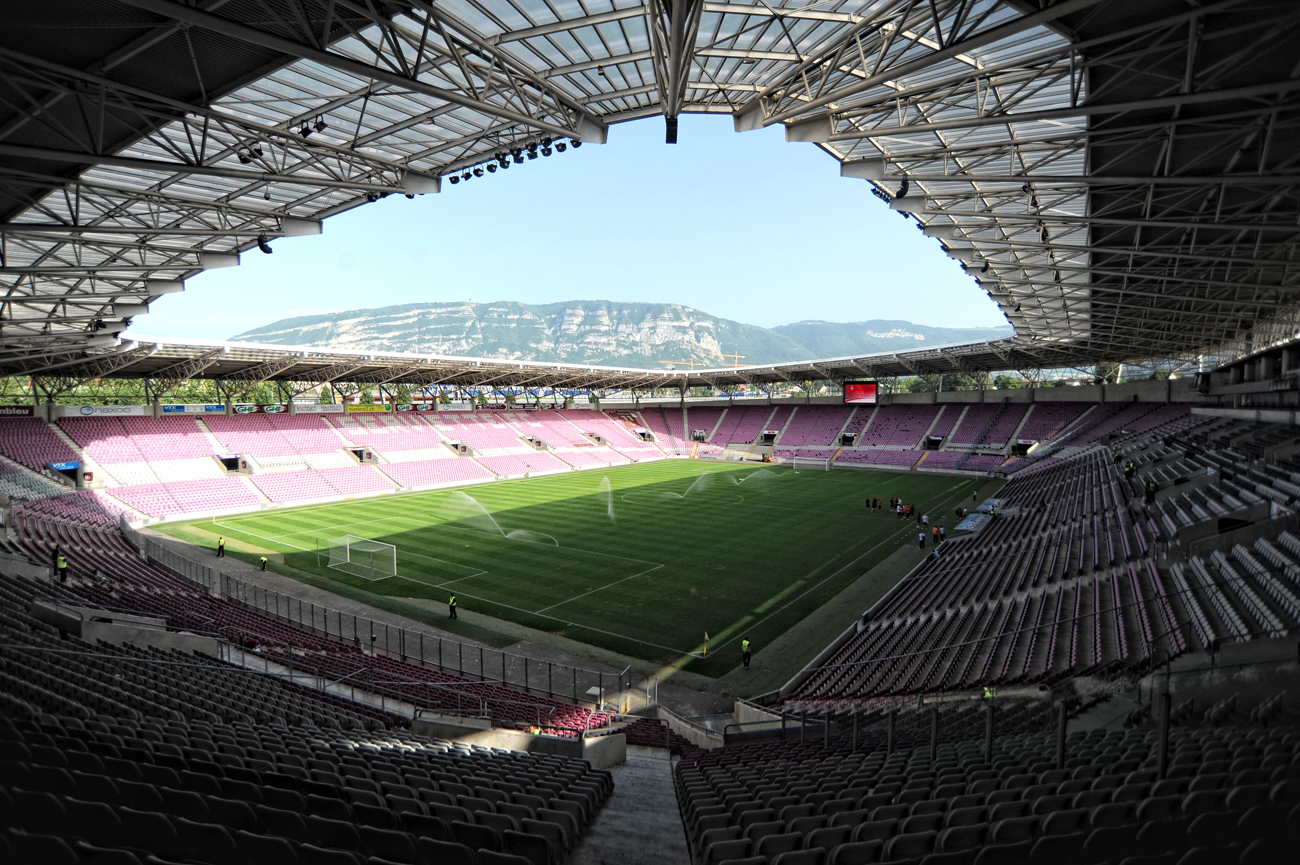
The Stade de Genève, home venue of Geneva's Servette FC

Sports in Geneva

- Basketball in Geneva
  - Lions de Genève
- Football in Geneva
  - Association football in Geneva
    - Servette FC
- Ice hockey In Geneva
  - Genève-Servette HC
- Sports competitions in Geneva
  - Geneva Marathon
  - Geneva Open
  - Geneva Open Challenger
- Sports venues in Geneva
  - Patinoire des Vernets
  - SEG Geneva Arena
  - Stade de Genève

== Economy and infrastructure of Geneva ==
Economy of Geneva

- Communications in Geneva
- Financial services in Geneva
  - Bank Lombard Odier & Co
  - CIM Bank
  - The Pictet Group
- Hotels in Geneva
  - Beau-Rivage Geneva
  - Hotel President Wilson
  - InterContinental Geneva
  - Le Richemond
- Tourism in Geneva

=== Transportation in Geneva ===
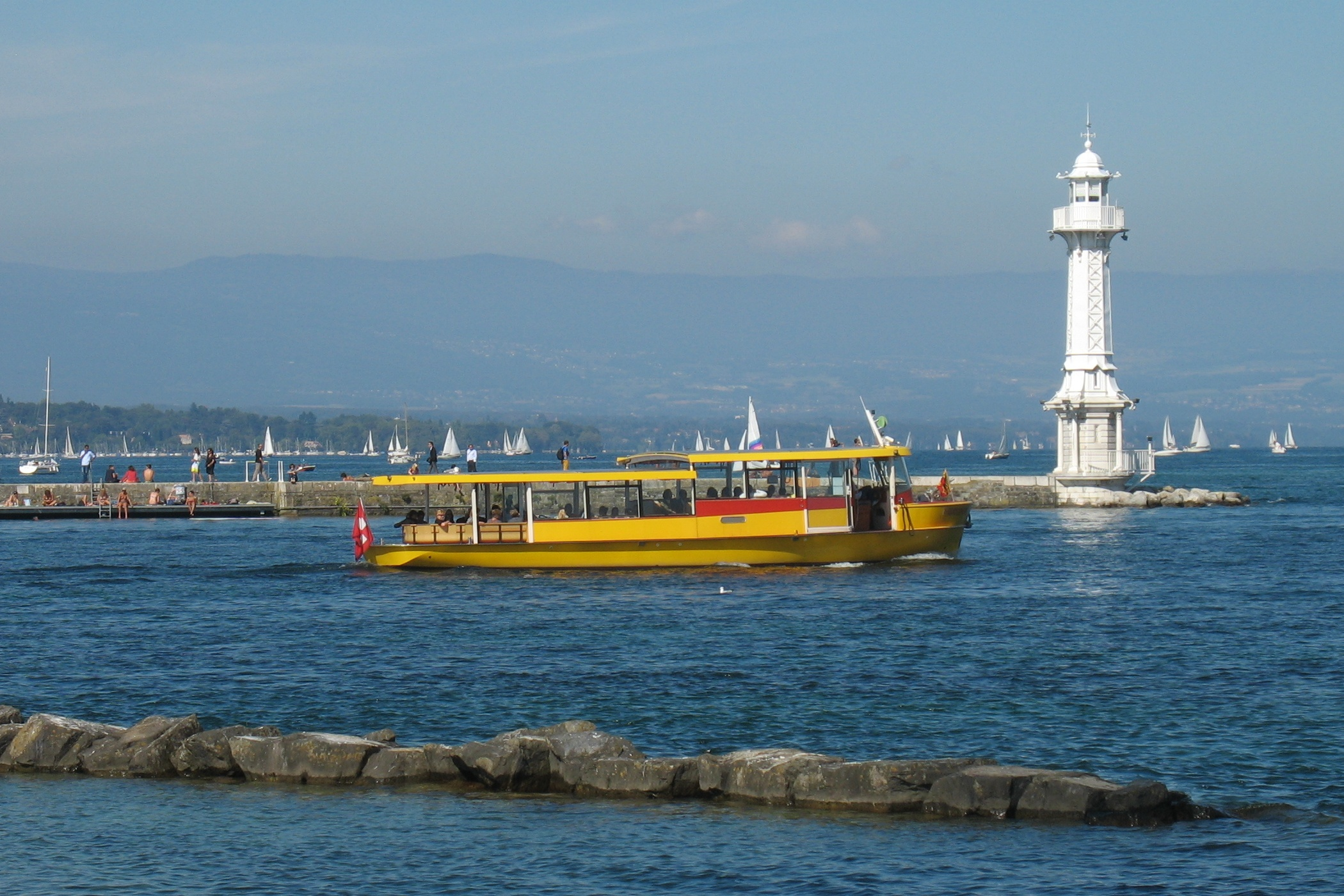
Mouette genevoise in front of the Les Pâquis lighthouse

Transportation in Geneva

- Public transport operators in Geneva
  - Geneva Public Transport
- Air transport in Geneva
  - Airports in Geneva
    - Geneva Airport
- Maritime transport in Geneva
  - Mouettes Genevoises Navigation
- Road transport in Geneva
  - Bus transport in Geneva
    - TOSA Flash Mobility, Clean City, Smart Bus
  - Trolleybuses in Geneva

==== Rail transport in Geneva ====
Rail transport in Geneva

- Railway stations in Geneva
  - Genève-Cornavin railway station
  - Geneva Airport railway station
- Trams in Geneva

== Education in Geneva ==
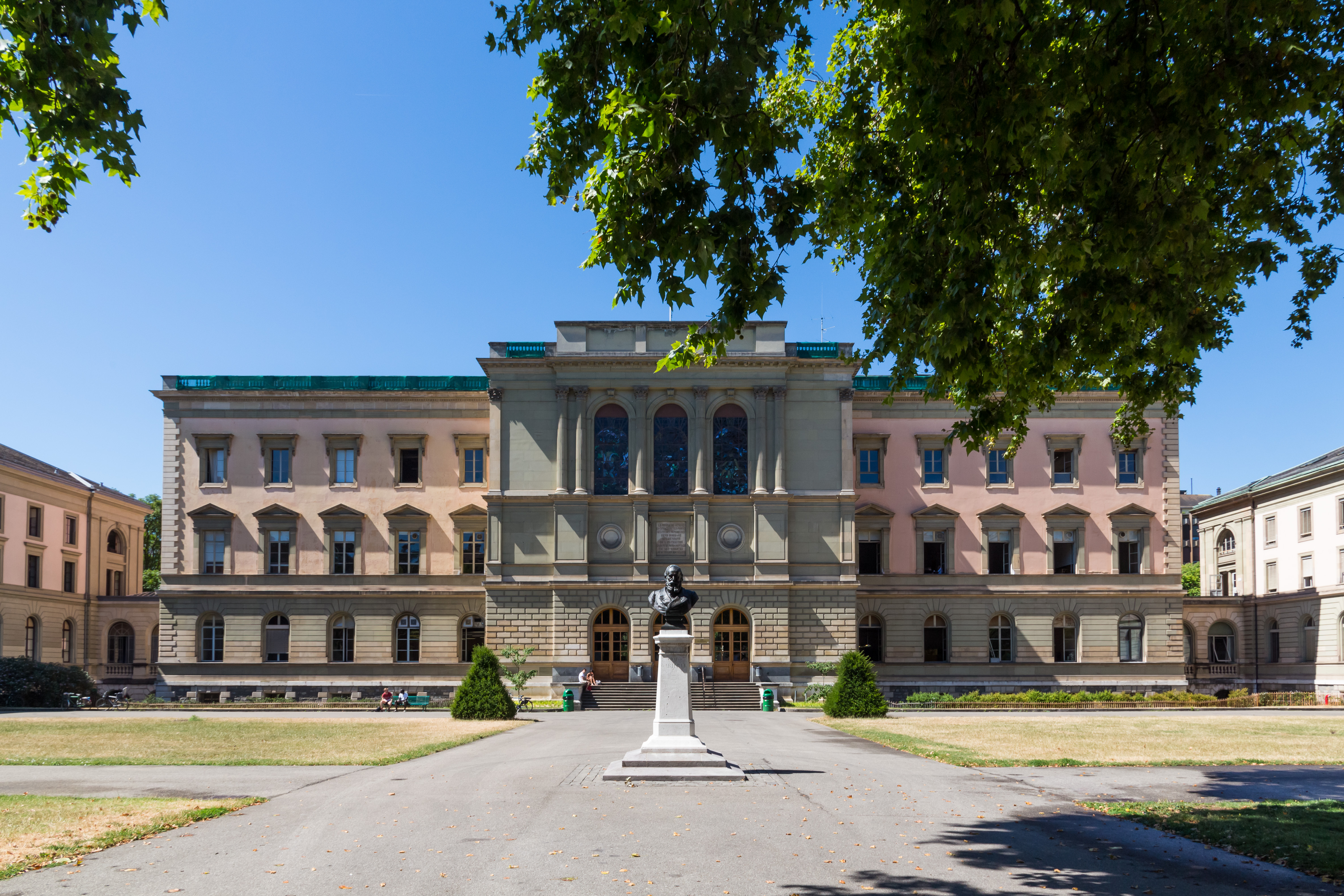
University of Geneva (Uni Bastions)

Education in Geneva

- International school in Geneva
  - International School of Geneva
- Universities in Geneva
  - University of Geneva
- Research institutes in Geneva
  - Geneva International Peace Research Institute

== Healthcare in Geneva ==
- Hospitals in Geneva
  - Clinique La Colline
  - Geneva University Hospital

== See also ==
- Outline of geography
