= Metres above the Adriatic =

Vertical datum used in parts of Europe

Coordinates: 45.646867°N 13.759867°E

Map of the various vertical reference areas in Europe. Countries using the Adriatic datum

Metres above the Adriatic (Italian: Metri sopra l'Adriatico, German: Meter über Adria, Serbo-Croatian: Metara iznad Jadrana) is the vertical datum used in Albania, Austria, Bosnia and Herzegovina, Croatia, Montenegro, North Macedonia, Serbia, and Slovenia to measure elevation, referring to the average water level of the Adriatic Sea at the Sartorio mole in the Port of Trieste.

== Gauge ==
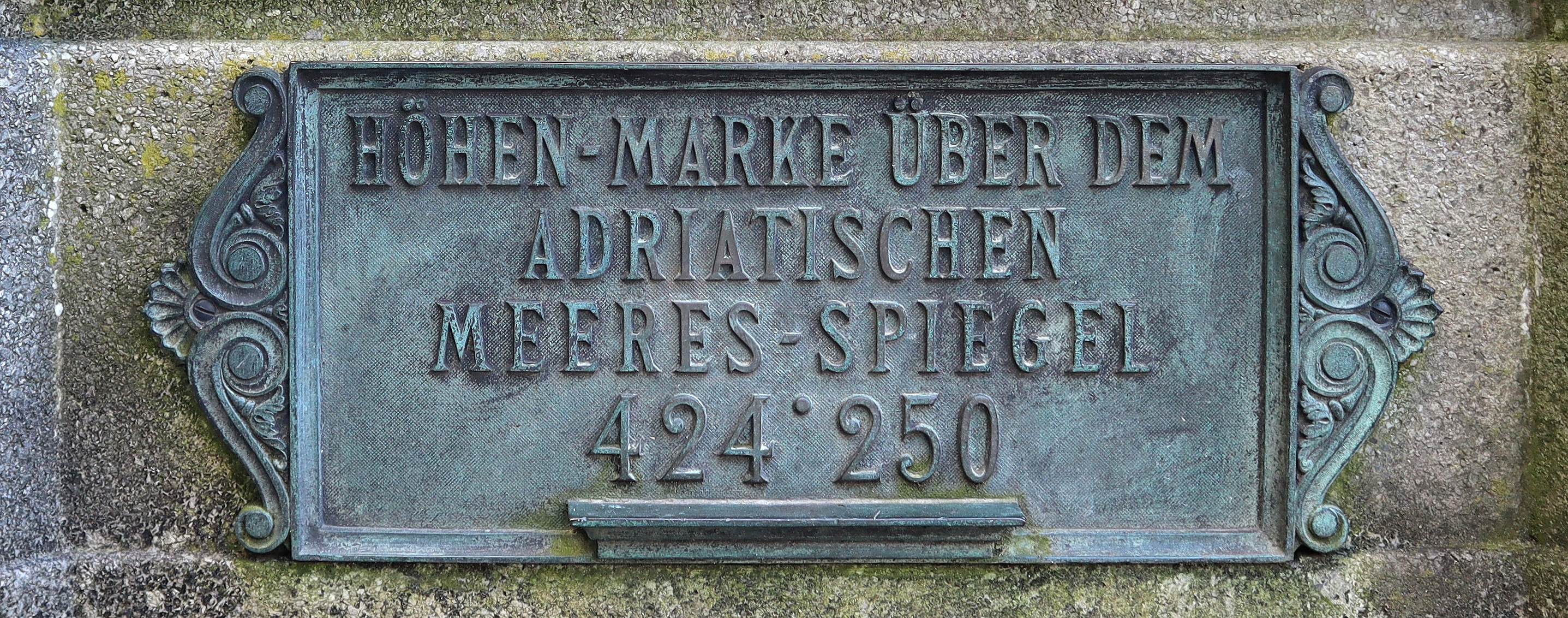
Benchmark (1888) in Salzburg

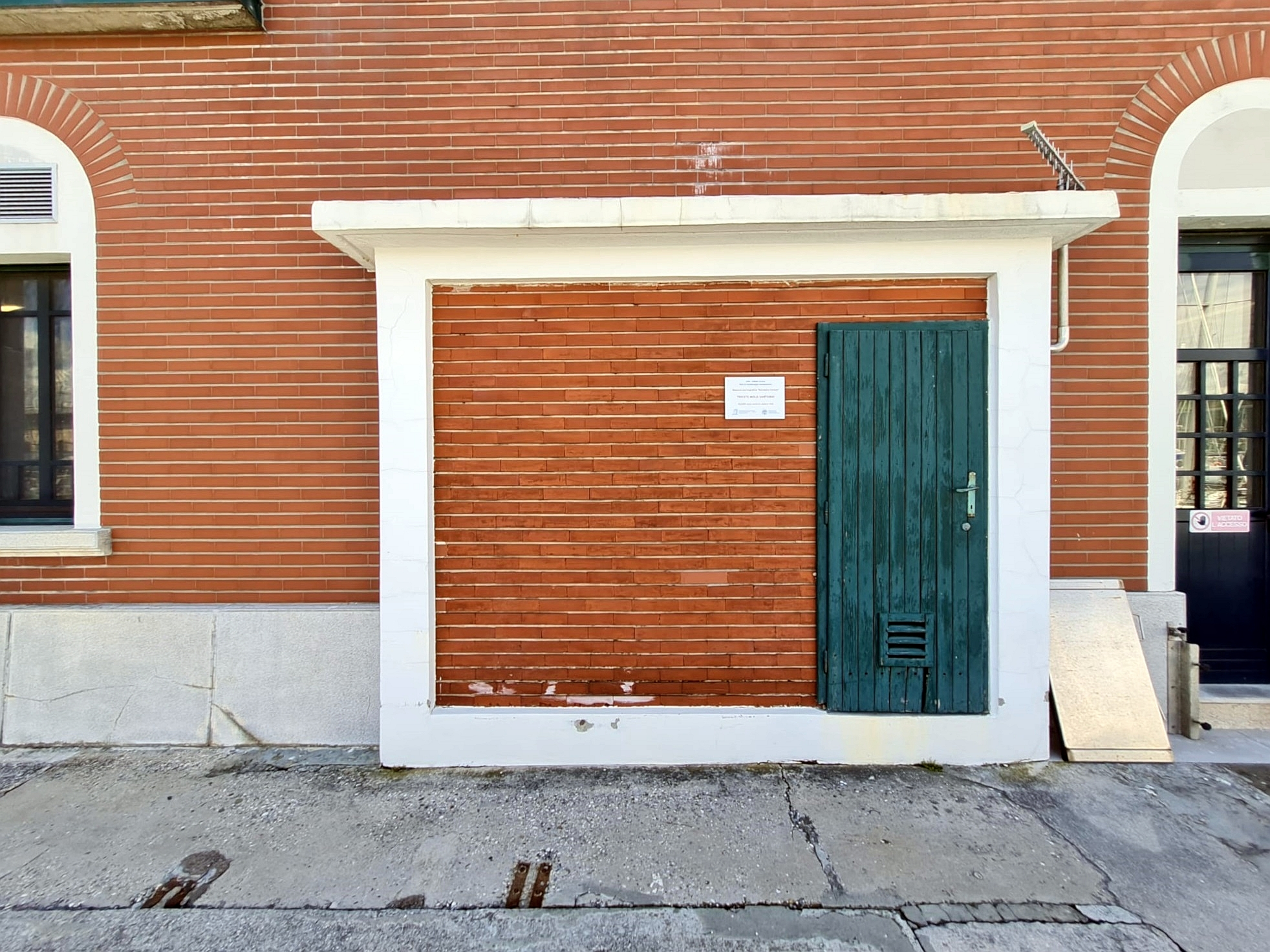
Instrument building of the Austro-Hungarian tide gauging station at Molo Sartorio in Trieste

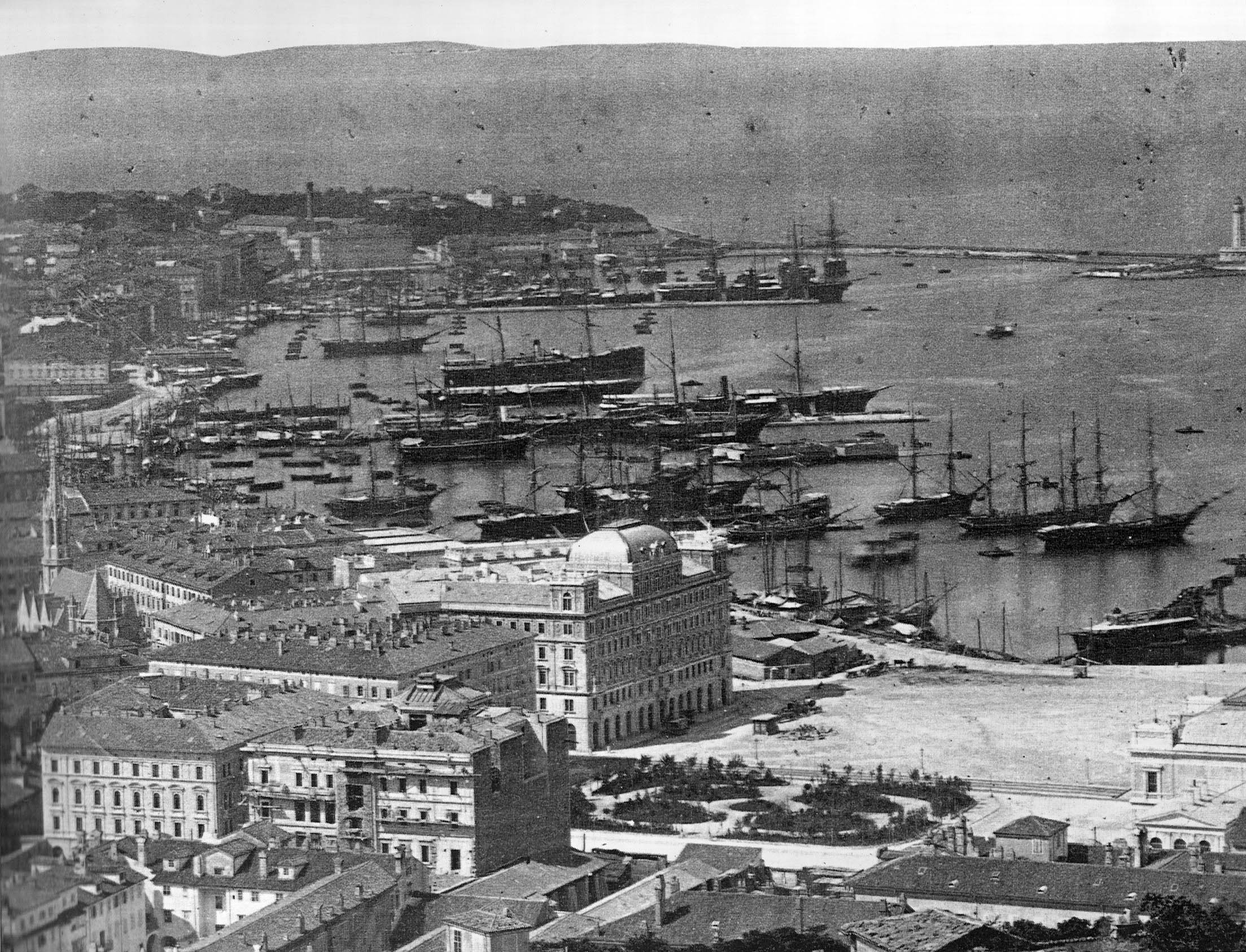
Port of Trieste, about 1885

The gauging station in the Port of Trieste was established in 1875 by the local observatory run by the military geographical institute of the Austro-Hungarian Army. The average water surface elevation at Molo Sartorio became the datum valid for the entire Austro-Hungarian monarchy. Although the former Yugoslav countries still use it, after World War II the Eastern Bloc successor states of Austria-Hungary such as Hungary and Czechoslovakia switched to the Kronstadt Gauge of the Baltic Sea, which is 0.6747 m (2.214 ft) higher.

For Austria the 1875 gauge is used as the datum, whereas the countries of the former Yugoslavia use the 1900 gauge (nadmorska visina, m/nv). In Albania (normal-orthometric height) heights are also referred to as "metres above the Adriatic," but a specific tide gauge in the port of Durrës is used.

== Abbreviation ==
The individual countries using this datum abbreviate it in different ways depending on their local language, as follows:

- Austria: m ü. Adria, m.ü.A. or müA, colloquially known as Seehöhe or Adriahöhe
- Hungary: mAf from méter Adria felett
- Former Yugoslavian states: m. i. J. from Metara iznad Jadrana

'Metres above the Adriatic' may be abbreviated in English to m.a.A.

== Height differences between Austria and neighbouring countries ==
In Austria orthometric height is used, while its neighbours use other height systems, which leads to differences. On the state borders these differences are:

- Germany: +25 to +34 cm, normal height according to the Normalhöhennull levelling system based on the Amsterdam Ordnance Datum
- Italy: −0.5 to −3.2 cm, orthometric height referring to Genoa Tide Gauge
- Switzerland and Liechtenstein: −1.6 to −7.5 cm, orthometric height – 'Metres above the Sea' (Meter über Meer) based on the elevation of the Pierres du Niton in Lake Geneva at 373.6 m (1,226 ft) above average Marseille Tide Gauge
- Slovakia: +57 cm, normal height based on Kronstadt Tide Gauge
- Slovenia: −8 to −12 cm, orthometric height – metres above the sea referring to Koper Tide Gauge
- Czech Republic: +46 to +56.3 cm, normal height based on Kronstadt Tide Gauge, and
- Hungary: +49.6 to +60.6 cm, normal height – 'Height above Sea Level' (Hungarian: Tengerszint feletti magasság) based on the elevation of the Nadap benchmark at 173.1638 m (568.123 ft) above Kronstadt Tide Gauge.

(Differences: H_{Austria} − H_{neighbouring states})

== See also ==
- Metre
- Normalhöhennull (NHN) (equivalent in Germany)
- Metres above the Sea (Switzerland)
