= Metres above the Sea (Switzerland) =

Vertical datum used in Switzerland

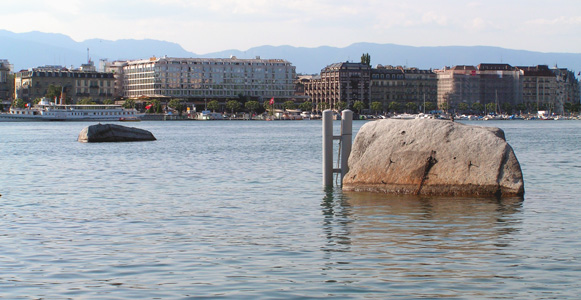
The Pierres du Niton in Geneva harbour

Metres above the Sea (German: Meter über Meer (m ü. M.)) is the vertical datum used in Switzerland. Both the system and the term are also used in the Principality of Liechtenstein.

== Use ==
In Switzerland, levelled heights from the Swiss national levelling network 1902 (LN 02) are used as official heights without compensation for gravity.

The reference point for the Swiss national height network is the Pierres du Niton (French: Neptune's Stones), a pair of unusual rocks in the harbour of Lake Geneva. That height is defined from the average height of the Marégraphe in Marseille, the reference point for height data in France, and rounded to 373.6 m. The height was only measured accurately in 1902.

As the height of the Pierres du Niton had been inaccurately measured in 1845 as being 376.86 meters, height information relating to this old horizon (for example in the Siegfried Map and the Dufour Map, both of them widely used) is 3.26 m higher than today's official values.

At the border between Switzerland and Austria, the Swiss heights are 6 to 75 mm higher than the Austrian heights above the Adriatic.

As gravitational potential cannot be neglected for applications with high accuracy requirements, the Swiss national height network 1995 (LHN95) created a new orthometric height vertical reference point, fixed to the geoid. The height of the new reference point, Zimmerwald Observatory, was chosen so that the Pierres du Niton reference point maintained its then current level. The heights of LHN95 differ from the LN02 heights by up to 50 cm (20 in). Due to the danger of confusion caused by the change in the height systems, new heights for official measurement have nevertheless not been introduced.

Establishment of a clearly understood common reference system is particularly important in cross-border projects involving Switzerland, because of the differing reference systems used in its neighboring countries.

== See also ==
- Metre
- Normalhöhennull (NHN) (equivalent in Germany)
- Metres above the Adriatic
