= Quai Gustave-Ador =

Street in Geneva, Switzerland

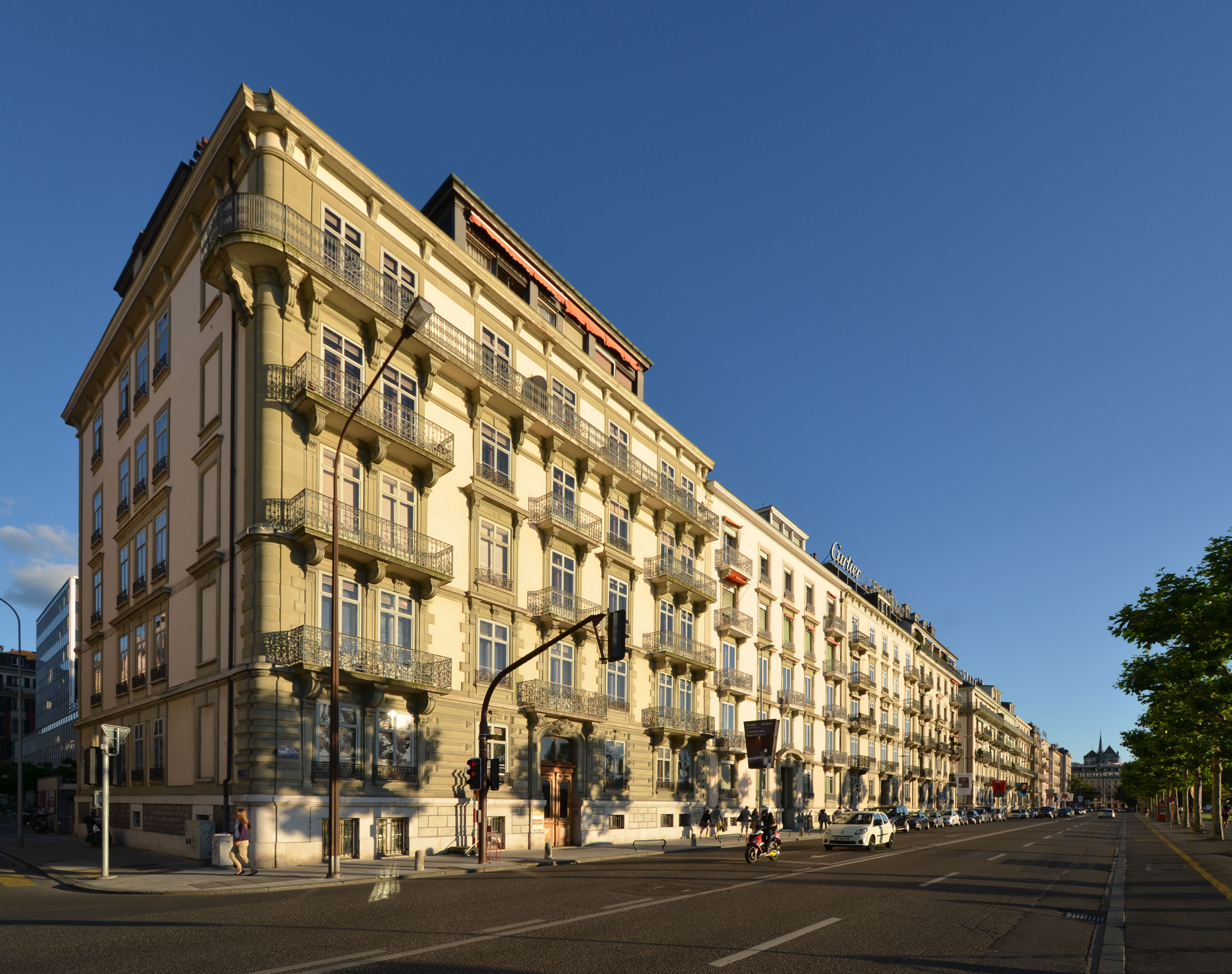
Quai Gustave Ador

To extend the south-side promenade of the Lake of Geneva from the Jardin Anglais, the Quai Gustave-Ador was constructed in 1856 with a length of around 1,800 m.

In 1936–37 the first rosebushes were planted and since then there are more than 13,000 rosebushes.

You will find the Jardin Anglais, the Jet d'eau, the Baby plage, the Port-Noir, the Parc La Grange and the Parc des Eaux Vives at this promenade. From here you can see the famous Pierres du Niton.

Today it is considered an important two lane main road connecting central Geneva with some south-eastern suburbs (Cologny, Vandoeuvres) and the French border, but it has still not lost its attraction for tourists and Genevans alike.
