= CIM Bank =

Swiss private bank

CIM Bank (CIM Banque)
- Industry: Finance
- Founded: 1990; 36 years ago
- Founder: Francesco Signorio
- Headquarters: Geneva, Switzerland
- Key people: Gabriele Ruffa (CEO); Thierry Mossé (managing partner); Marie France Monn Agboton (member of Executive Committee), Panagiotis Kostopoulos (member of Executive Committee)
- Products: Commodities Trading, Financial Services, Investment Banking, Investment management
- Number of employees: 192
- Website: www.cimbanque.com

CIM Bank is a Swiss private bank. Founded in Geneva in 1990, by Dr Francesco Signorio (Luxembourg). Since then the Bank has been continuously growing every year. The Bank actually serves around 10'000 institutional, corporate and private clients worldwide.

The Bank has 192 employees and is located in Geneva, Wollerau and Lugano. CIM Bank is engaged in commercial transactions, commodities trading, investment banking, asset management and online trading. CIM Bank is regulated by FINMA, and is a member of the Swiss Bankers Association. CIM Bank is also a member of SIX Swiss Exchange.

The Bank is currently allowing their customers to trade in more than 20 currencies and various precious metals.

== Services ==
CIM Bank provides personal current accounts, commercial (corporate) accounts and deposit accounts.
