= Port-Noir =

Geneva harbor

View of the Port-Noir with a column commemorating the 1814 arrival of the Swiss Army

The Port-Noir is a marina-like harbor situated at the end of Quai Gustave-Ador and the beginning of the Quai de Cologny in Geneva, Switzerland.

Here you can see the statue La Brise (The Breeze) which was sculpted by Henry Koenig in 1939.

This is a location of historical and symbolic importance: it was here that on 1 June 1814 two Swiss contingents, from Solothurn and Fribourg, landed. This event led to the integration of the Republic of Geneva into the Swiss Confederation on 19 May 1815.

== See also ==
- Switzerland in the Napoleonic era
- History of Geneva
