= Parc des Eaux Vives =

Park in Geneva, Switzerland

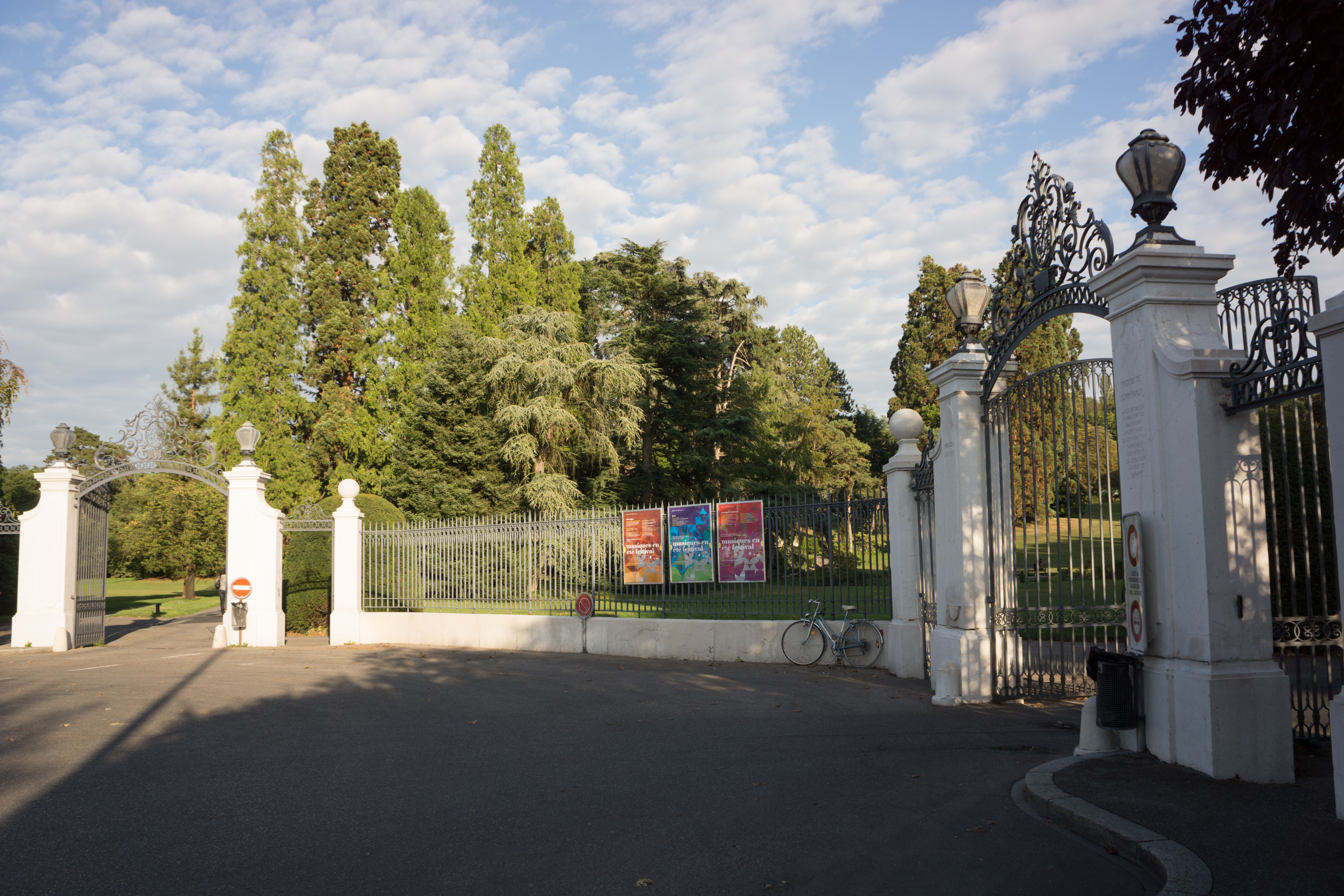
Parc des Eaux-Vives

The Parc des Eaux Vives is a park at the Quai Gustave-Ador in Geneva with a surface area of 45,000 m^{2} (480,000 sq ft). It is a sloping hillside park topped by a historic mansion dating back to the 18th century, that now serves as a hotel and restaurant. The headquarters of the Geneva Sports Association is also located in this park.

== Location ==
The park is located in the former commune of Eaux-Vives, now part of the city of Geneva, on the left bank of Lake Geneva, in the eastern extension of the Parc La Grange. Sloping down towards the lake, it is bounded by the Quai Gustave-Ador at the bottom and the Frontenex road and plateau at the top.

== History ==
The Parc des Eaux Vives sits on a large estate, founded in the 16th century by the Plonjon family and then purchased in 1714 by the banker Joseph Bouer, who added the manor house in 1750. The home served as a boarding house at the beginning of the 19th century, before Louis Favre purchased the entire property in 1866.

Favrier's property was acquired by the Société de l'Industrie des Hôtels in 1897. Since at least 1898, there have been public attractions available on the park, with 50 centimes entry fee.

The manor house was converted into a high-end restaurant around 1900. In 1907, the park was further developed by landscape gardener Jules Allemand on behalf of the Société des Hôtels de Genève.

A "Luna-Park" was added in 1911. It included several attractions, on top of the park's restaurant and theatre. These included Afrique mystérieuse ("Mysterious Africa"), a recreation of an "African village" consisting of some one hundred men, women, and children; a water slide; a skating rink; and a "Venetian lake" with gondolas. It was promoted as a celebration of science and was funded by entrepreneurs from Geneva.

In 1913, the Parc des Eaux Vives was formally purchased by the commune of Les Eaux-Vives. It became a property of the city of Geneva in 1931, when the communes unified.

== Attractions ==
As well as the restaurant, the park includes a small pond fed by a stream flowing from a cave, and multiple collections of large plants which includes an important collection of rhododendrons, donated by the Netherlands to thank Geneva for its humanitarian aid during the Second World War.

Since 1898, the park has been home to the Tennis Club of Geneva, the first tennis club in the city. A clubhouse was built in 1928 and a main court in 1958, which hosted the Grand Prix ATP Tour de Genève in 1980 and 1991.
