= Jet d'Eau =

Fountain in Geneva, Switzerland

Coordinates: 46°12′26″N 6°09′22″E

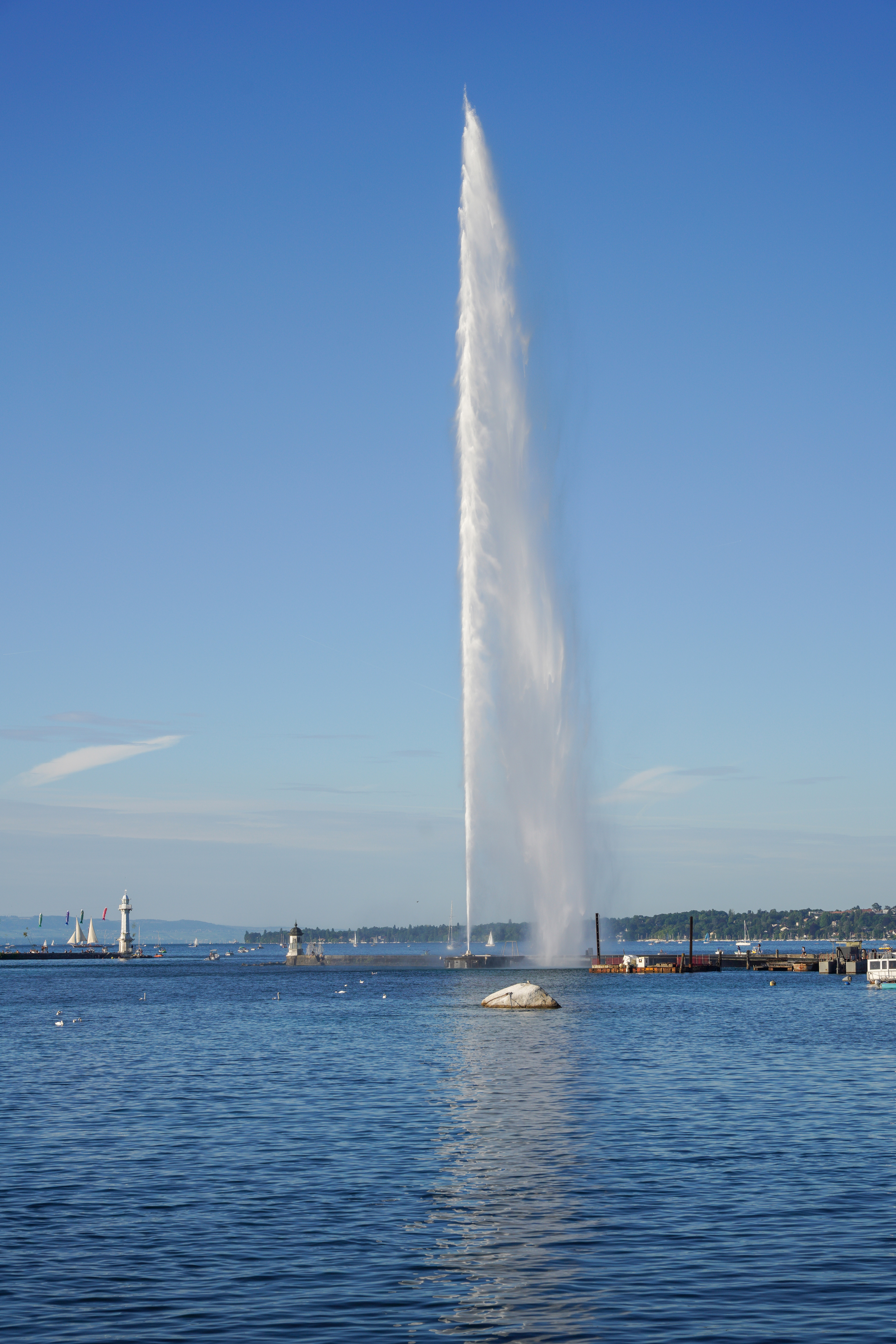
The Jet d'Eau fountain in Geneva

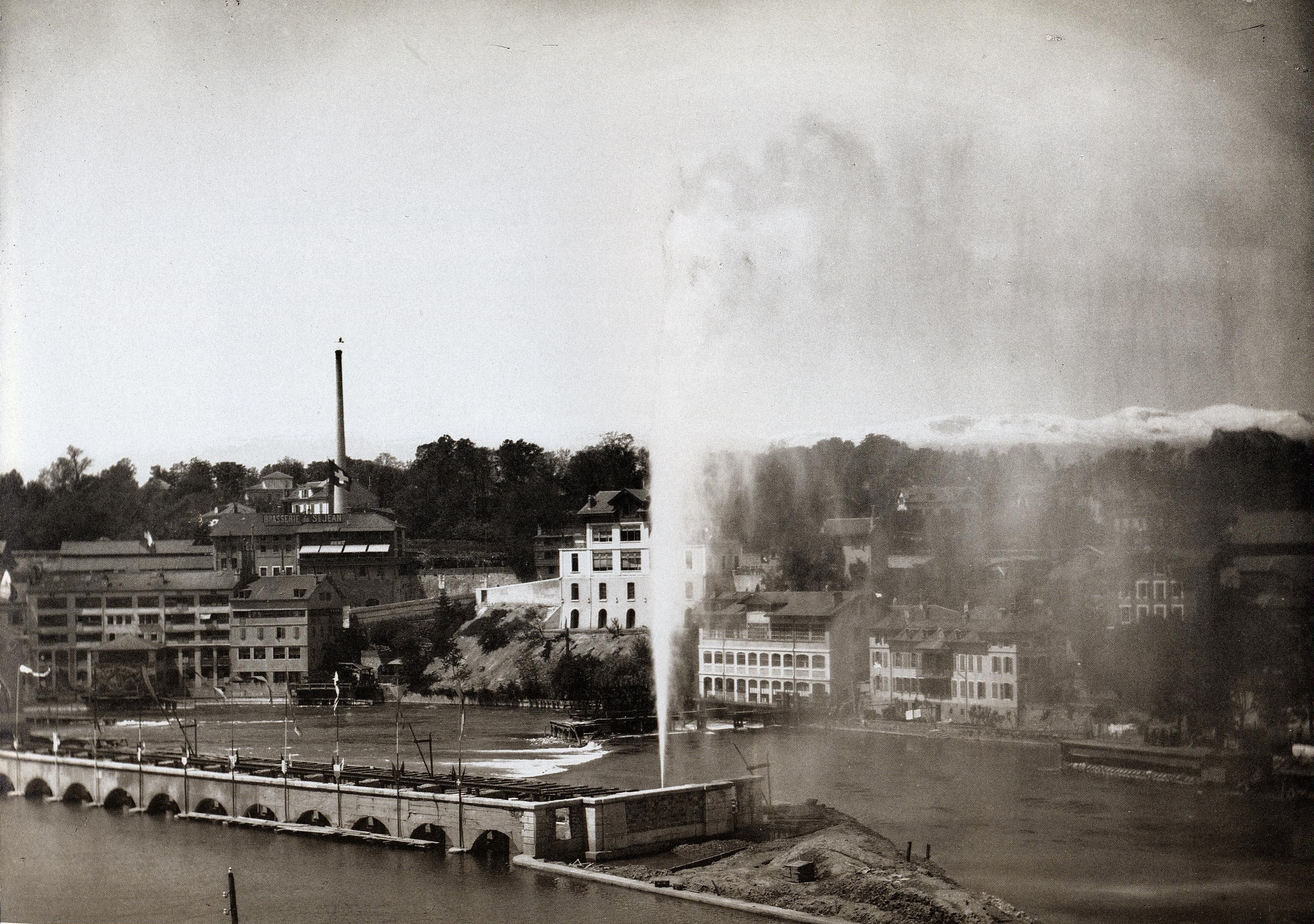
The first jet d'eau, around 1886.

The Jet d'Eau (French pronunciation: [ʒɛ do], Water-Jet) is a large fountain in Geneva, Switzerland, and is one of the city's most famous landmarks, being featured on the city's official tourism web site. Situated where Lake Geneva exits as the Rhône, it is visible throughout the city and from the air, even when flying over Geneva at an altitude of ten kilometres (33,000 ft).

Five hundred litres (130 US gal) of water per second are jetted to an altitude of 150 metres (490 ft) by two 500 kW pumps, operating at 2,400 V, consuming one megawatt of electricity and costing 510,000 CHF per year. The water leaves the ten-centimetre (4 in) nozzle at a speed of 200 km/h (55 m/s). At any given moment, there are about 7,000 L (1,800 US gal) of water in the air. Unsuspecting visitors to the fountain—which can be reached via a stone jetty from the left bank of the lake—may be surprised to find themselves drenched after a slight change in wind direction.

== History ==
The first Jet d'Eau was installed in 1886 at the Usine de la Coulouvrenière, a little further downstream from its present location. It was used as a safety valve for a hydraulic power network and could reach a height of about 30 metres (100 ft). In 1891, its aesthetic value was recognised and it was moved to its present location to celebrate the Federal Gymnastics Festival and the 600th anniversary of the Swiss Confederation, when it was operated for the first time. Its maximum height was about 90 metres (300 ft). The present Jet d'Eau was installed in 1951 in a partially submerged pumping station to pump lake water instead of city water.

Since 2003, the fountain has operated during the day all year round, except in case of frost or particularly strong wind. It also operates in the evenings between spring and autumn, when it is lit by a set of 21 lights consuming 9 kW.

On 25 August 2016, the fountain celebrated its 125th anniversary at its present location. Between 30 March and 11 June 2020, the jet was shut off while the city was under public health measures due to COVID-19.

The Jet d'Eau featured in the titles and cut scenes of the late 1960s British television series The Champions.

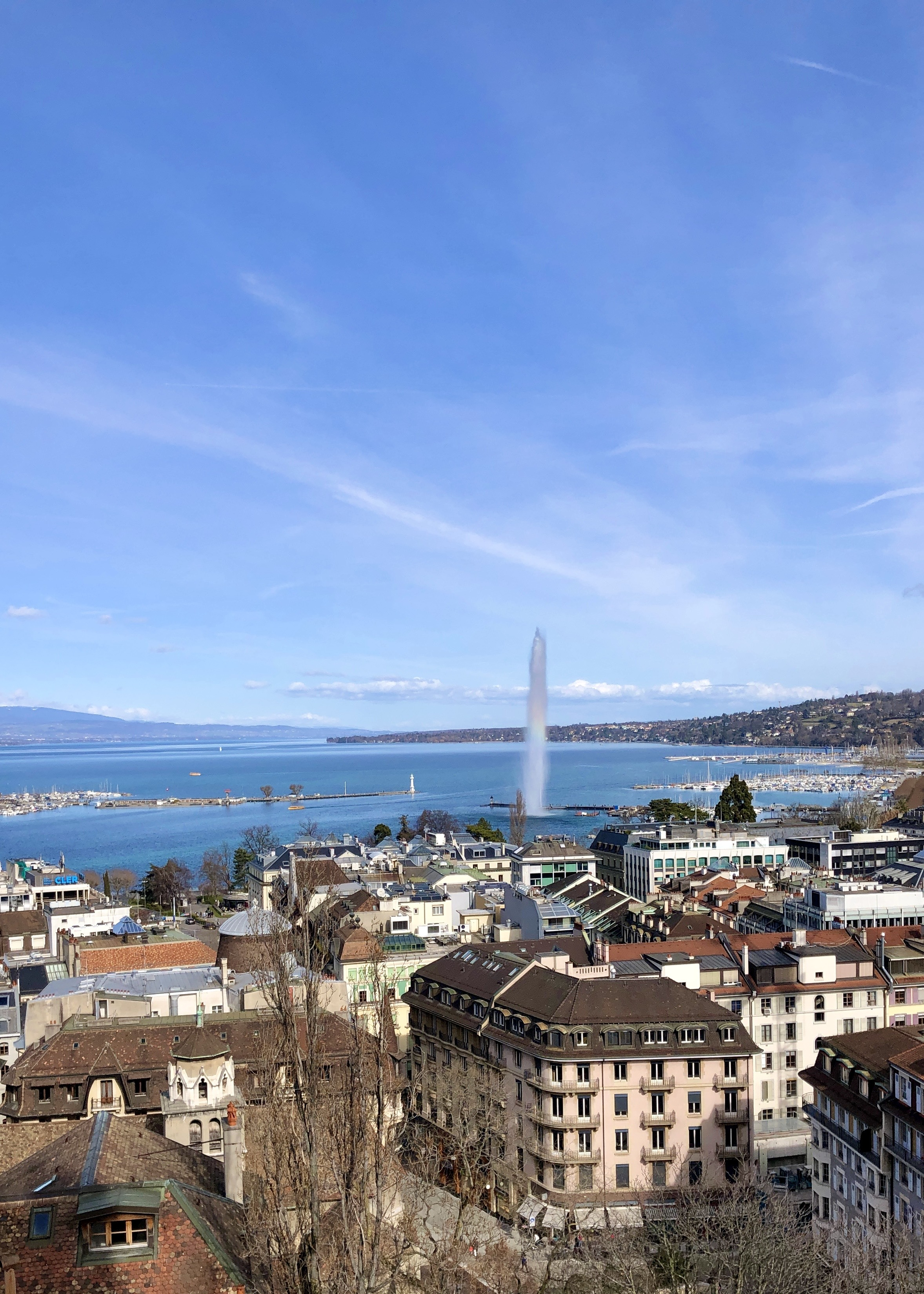
View of Jet D'eau from St Pierre Cathedral

== Images ==
Aerial view in 1937, before the contemporary Jet d'Eau, photographed by Walter Mittelholzer

Aerial view in 1954

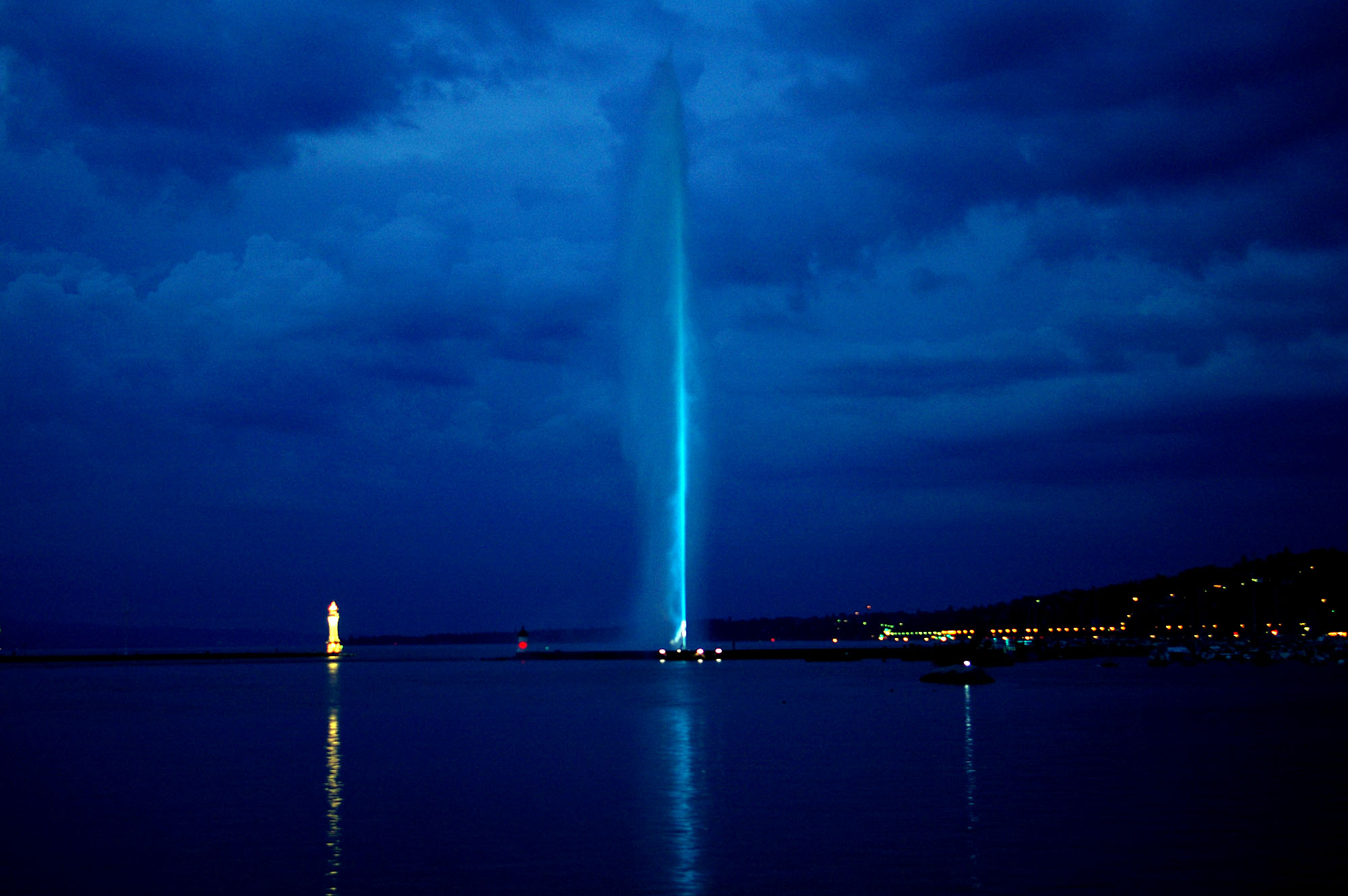
Jet d'Eau with blue light in 2007

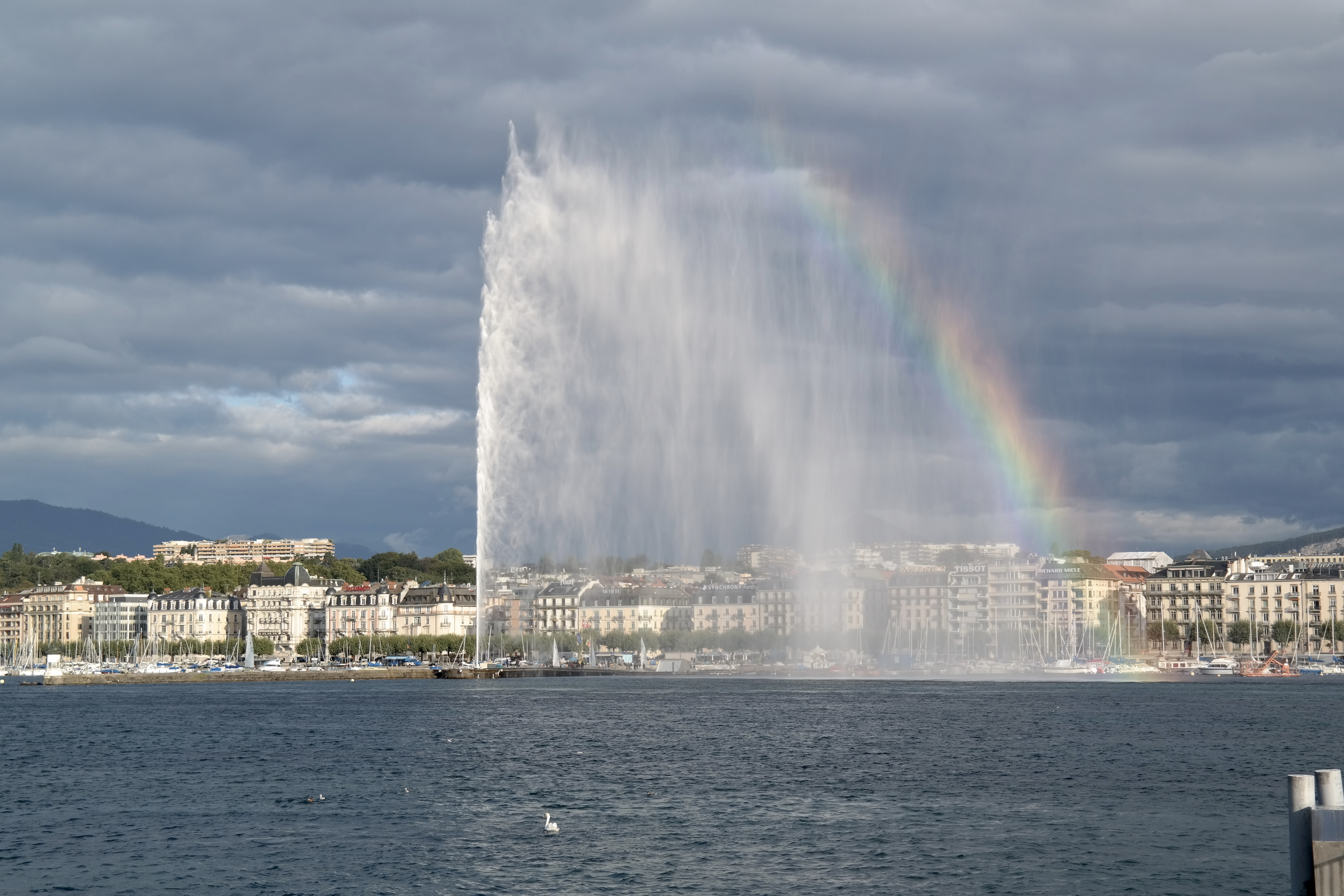
In 2019 with rainbow effect

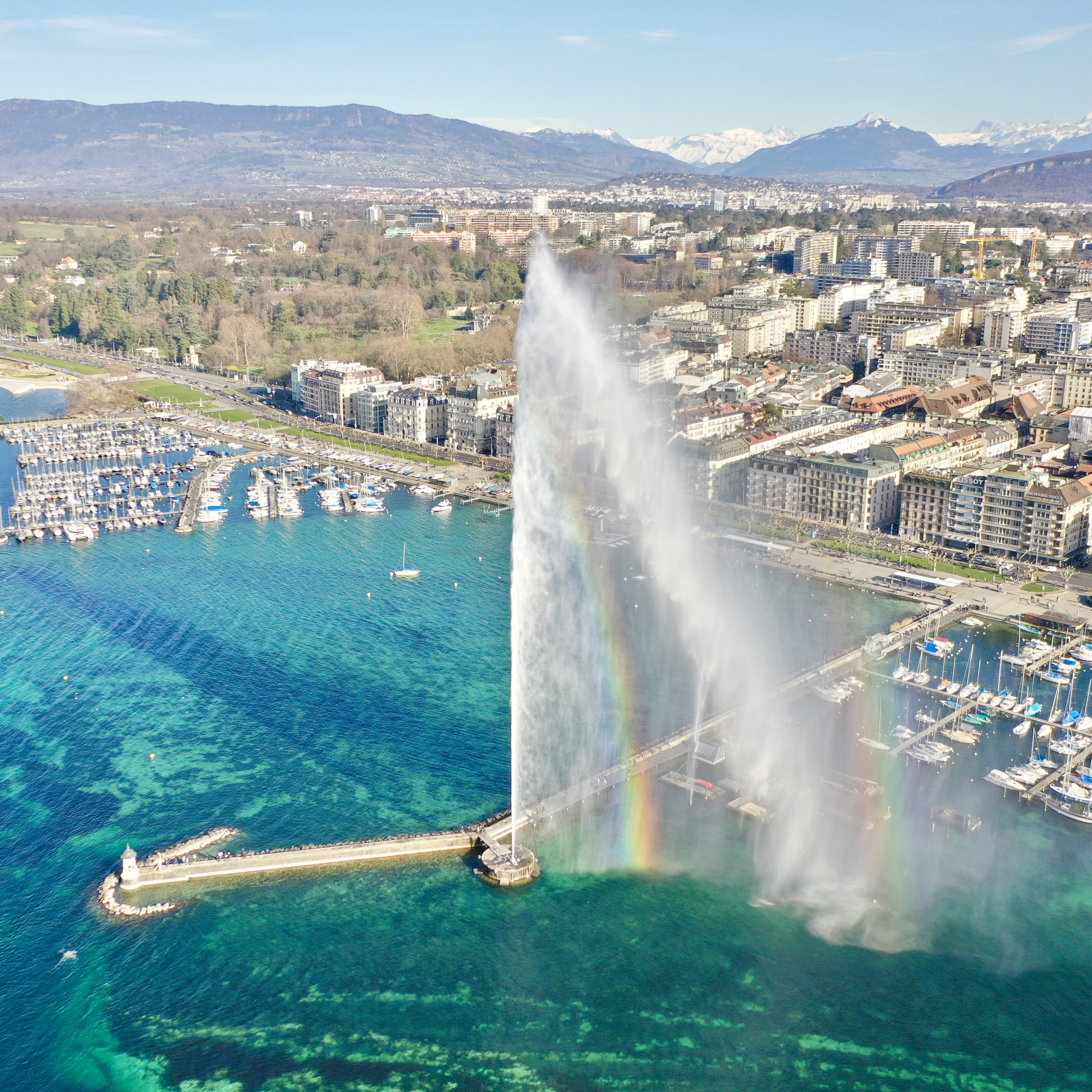
Aerial view in 2020

== See also ==
- Captain James Cook Memorial, similar water jet fountain in Canberra, Australia
