= Pierres du Niton =

Boulders in Lake Geneva and Swiss height reference

- glacial erratics
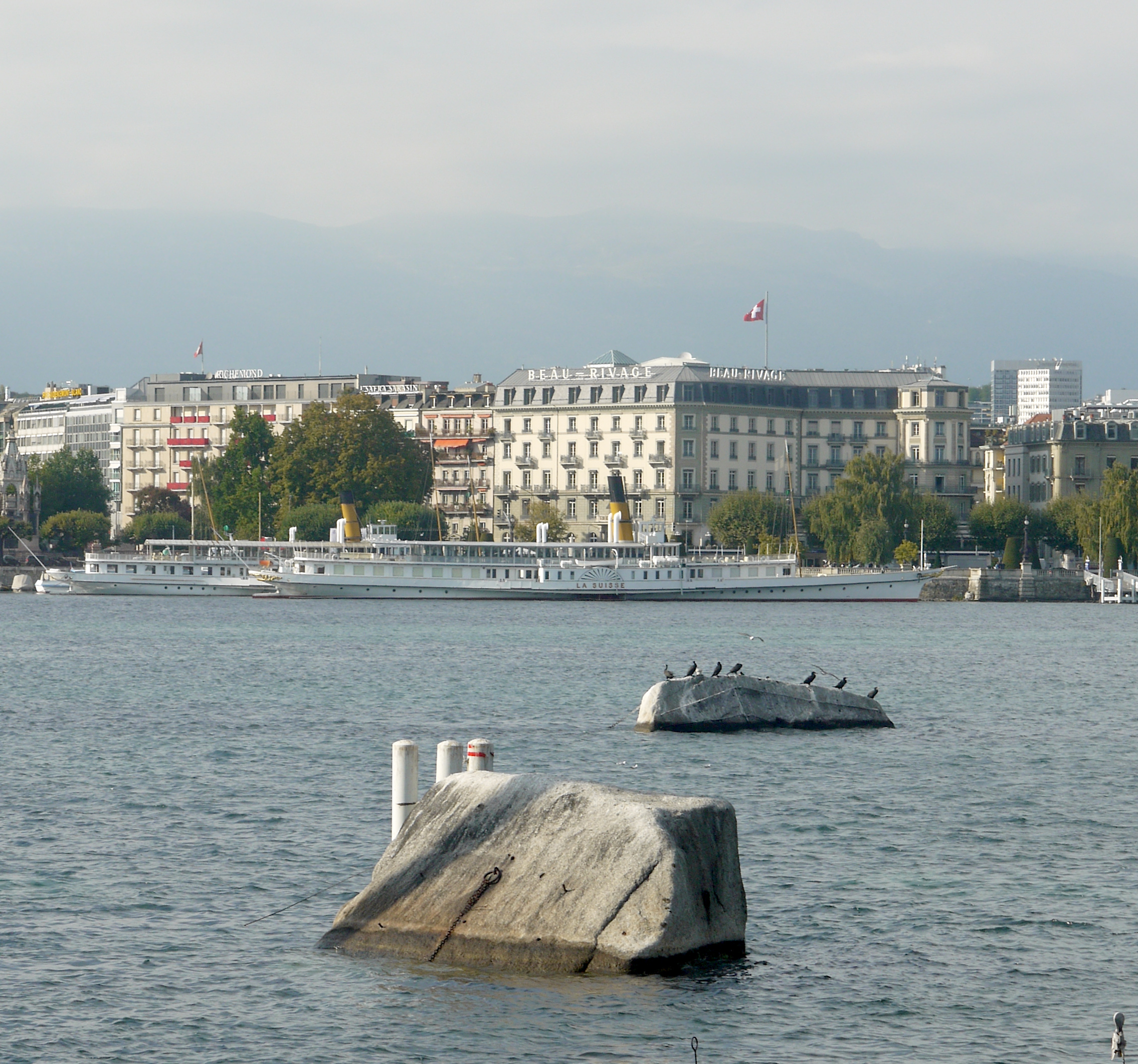
- The Pierres du Niton seen from the left bank of Geneva harbor

- Location within Switzerland
- Coordinates: 46°12′20″N 6°09′16″E
- Location: Geneva, Switzerland
- Age: c. 303 million years
- Geology: Mont Blanc massif
- Elevation: 373.6 m (1,226 ft)
- Designation: Geotope of National Significance

The Pierres du Niton (French for Neptune's Stones) are two glacial erratics in Lake Geneva, Switzerland, in Geneva harbor. On the left bank of the lake near Quai Gustave-Ador, they are remnants from the last ice age, left by the Rhone glacier. Because of their role in Swiss cartography, the rocks have been declared a "Geotope", a national site of geological heritage.

== Geology ==
Genevan scientist Horace Bénédict de Saussure identified the rocks as granite from the Alps in 1779. Jean-André Deluc later described the two rocks as part of a larger group of 24 erratics of similar composition: a granite with large feldspar crystals, slightly violet quartz, and slightly green chlorite. More recent analysis has determined their likely origin in the Mont Blanc massif, being dated to around 303 million years before present. The Repère ("landmark") Pierre du Niton is the name of the rock which is bigger and further from the shore

== History ==
The word Niton is derived from the ancient water god Neptune, who was revered by the Gauls who settled at the lake, as old inscriptions in Geneva and Lausanne indicate.

Guillaume-Henri Dufour used the Repère as a height starting point by the development of the Dufour maps from 1845 to 1864 in the graduation 1:100 000. At that time the height over sea level was estimated and decreed to be 376.86 m. Up to today, this stone forms the authoritative point of the Swiss height measurement system. However, the height was newly evaluated in 1902 to be 373.6m over sea level. This is why the data in maps of Switzerland made before 1902 differ by 3.26 m from today's official values.

In the Bronze Age, these stones may have had a spiritual significance and been used in religious ceremonies. This has been hypothesized due to square holes at the top of the larger stone, discovered in 1660, which seem to have been hewed by Middle Bronze Age (c. 1500–1200 BCE) axes.
