= Europa regina =

16th-century map-like depiction of the European continent as a queen

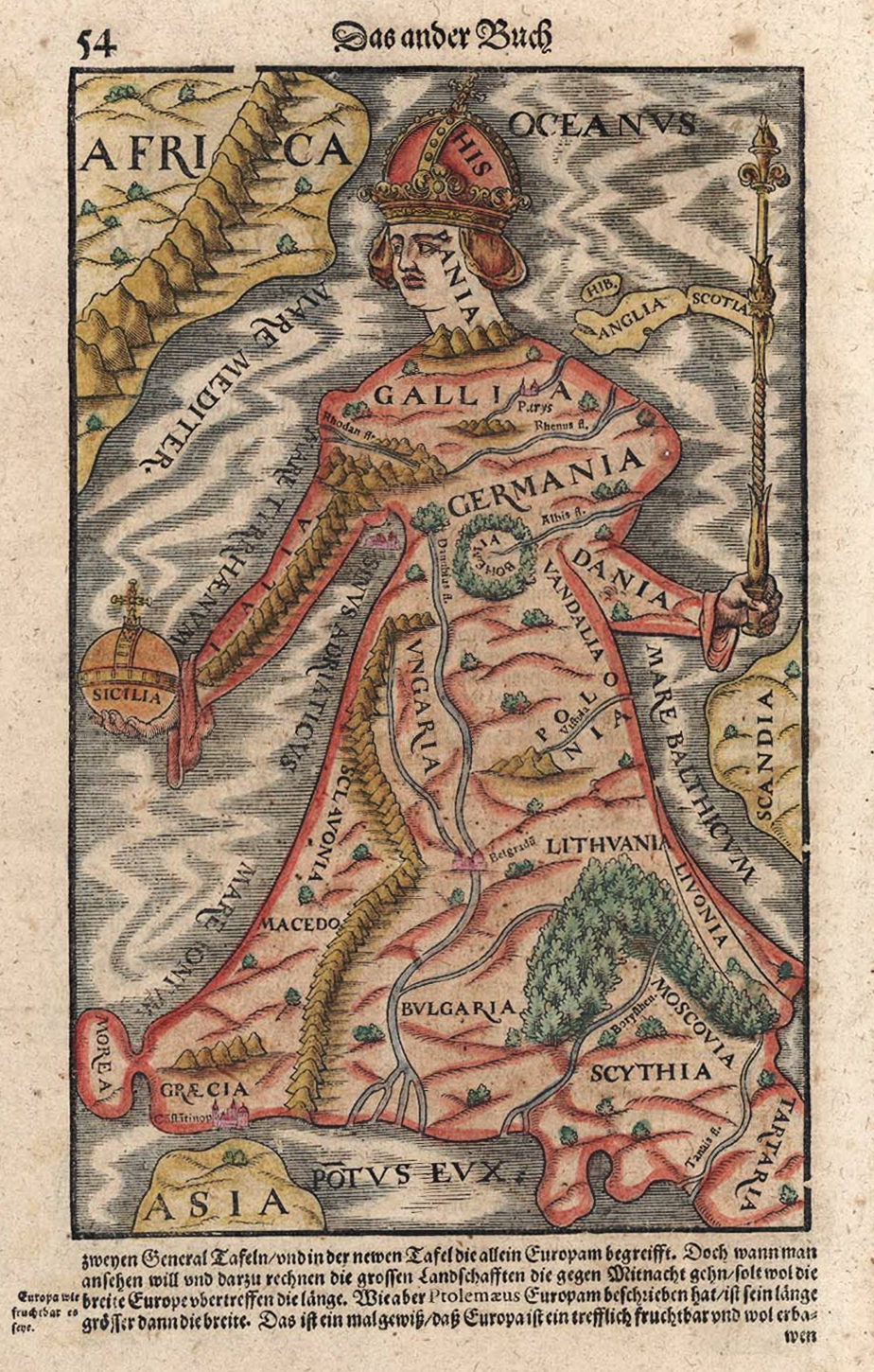
Europa regina in Sebastian Münster's "Cosmographia"

Europa regina, Latin for 'Queen Europe', is the map-like depiction of the European continent as a queen. Made popular in the 16th century, the map shows Europe as a young and graceful woman wearing imperial regalia. The Iberian Peninsula (Hispania) is the head, wearing a hoop crown. The Pyrenees, forming the neck, separate the Iberian peninsula from France (Gallia), which makes up the upper chest. The Holy Roman Empire (Germania and other territories) is the centre of the torso, with Bohemia (sometimes Austria in early depictions) being the heart of the woman (alternatively described as a medallion at her waist). Her long gown stretches to Hungary, Poland, Lithuania, Livonia, Bulgaria, Muscovy, Macedonia and Greece. In her arms, formed by Italy and Denmark, she holds a sceptre and an orb (Sicily). The map erroneously depicts Europe as mostly separated from Asia by sea. In most depictions, Africa, Asia and the Scandinavian peninsula are partially shown, as are the British Isles, in schematic form.

== Origins ==
During the European Middle Ages, maps typically adhered to the Jerusalem-centered T-O scheme, depicting Europe, Asia and Africa. Separate maps of Europe were extremely rare; the only known examples are a map from Lambert of Saint-Omer's Liber Floridus, published in 1112, and a 14th-century Byzantine map. The next Europe-focused map was published by cartographer Johannes Putsch from Innsbruck in 1537, at the beginning of the Early Modern Age.

The Putsch-map was the first to depict Europe as an Europa regina, with the European regions forming a female human shape with crown, sceptre and globus cruciger. The map was first printed by Calvinist Christian Wechel. Though much about the origination and initial perception of this map is uncertain, it is known that Putsch (whose name was Latinized as Johannes Bucius Aenicola, 1516–1542) maintained close relations with Holy Roman Emperor Ferdinand I of Habsburg, and that the map's popularity increased significantly during the second half of the 16th century. The modern term Europa regina was not yet used by Putsch's contemporaries, who instead used the Latin phrase Europa in forma virginis ("Europe in the shape of a maiden"), and spread in combination with Putsch's poem Europa lamentans, addressed to the emperors, about them alleviating Europe from its wars.

In 1587, Jan Bußemaker published a copper engraving by Matthias Quad, showing an adaptation of Putsch's Europa regina, as "Europae descriptio". Since 1588, another adaption was included in all subsequent editions of Sebastian Münster's "Cosmographia", earlier editions had it only sometimes included. Heinrich Bünting's "Itenerarium sacrae scripturae", which had a map of Europe with female features included in its 1582 edition, switched to Europa regina in its 1589 edition. Based on these and other examples, the year 1587 marks the point when many publications began adopting the imagery of Europa regina.

== Symbolism ==
Europa regina and the House of Habsburg
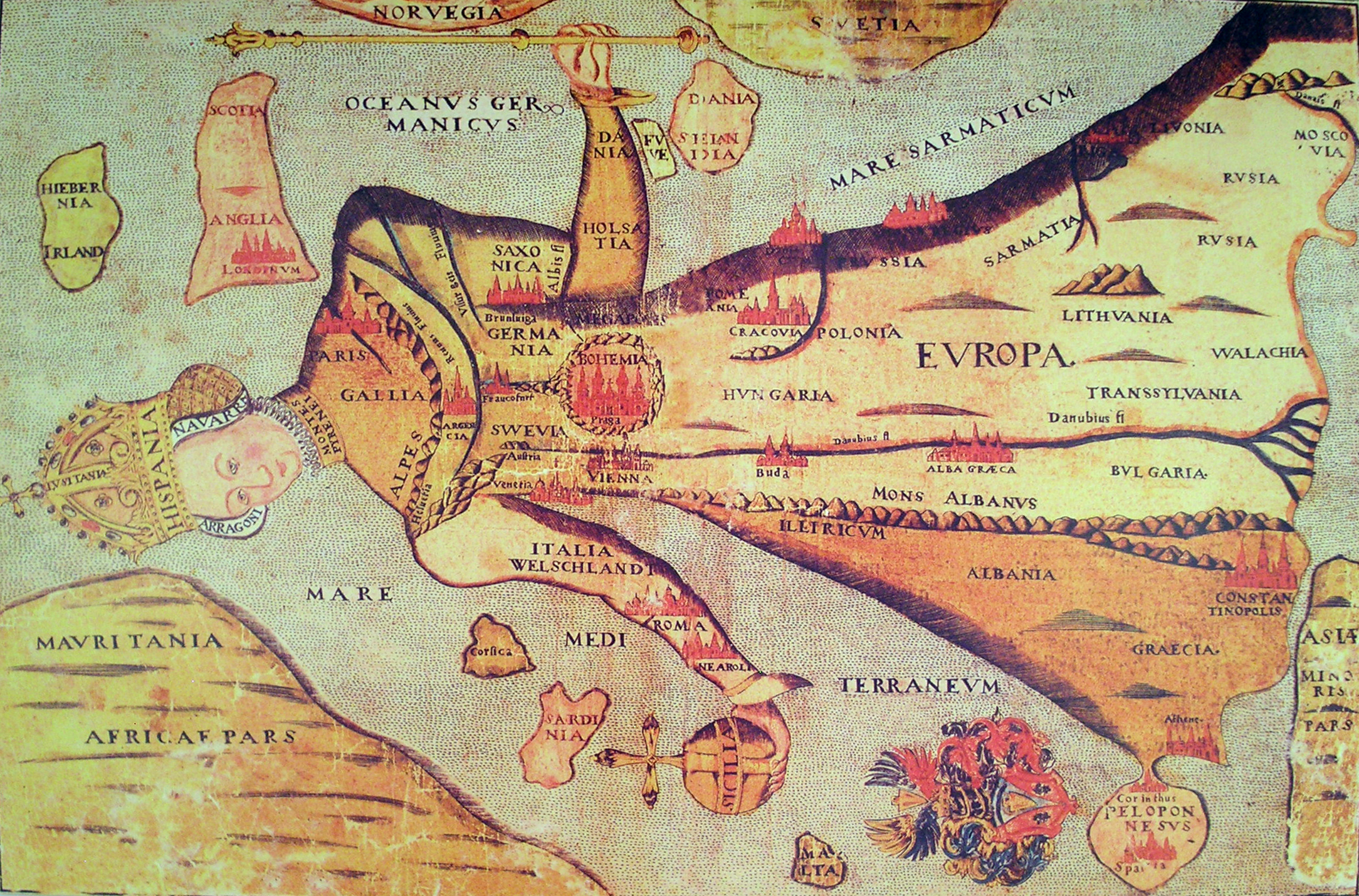
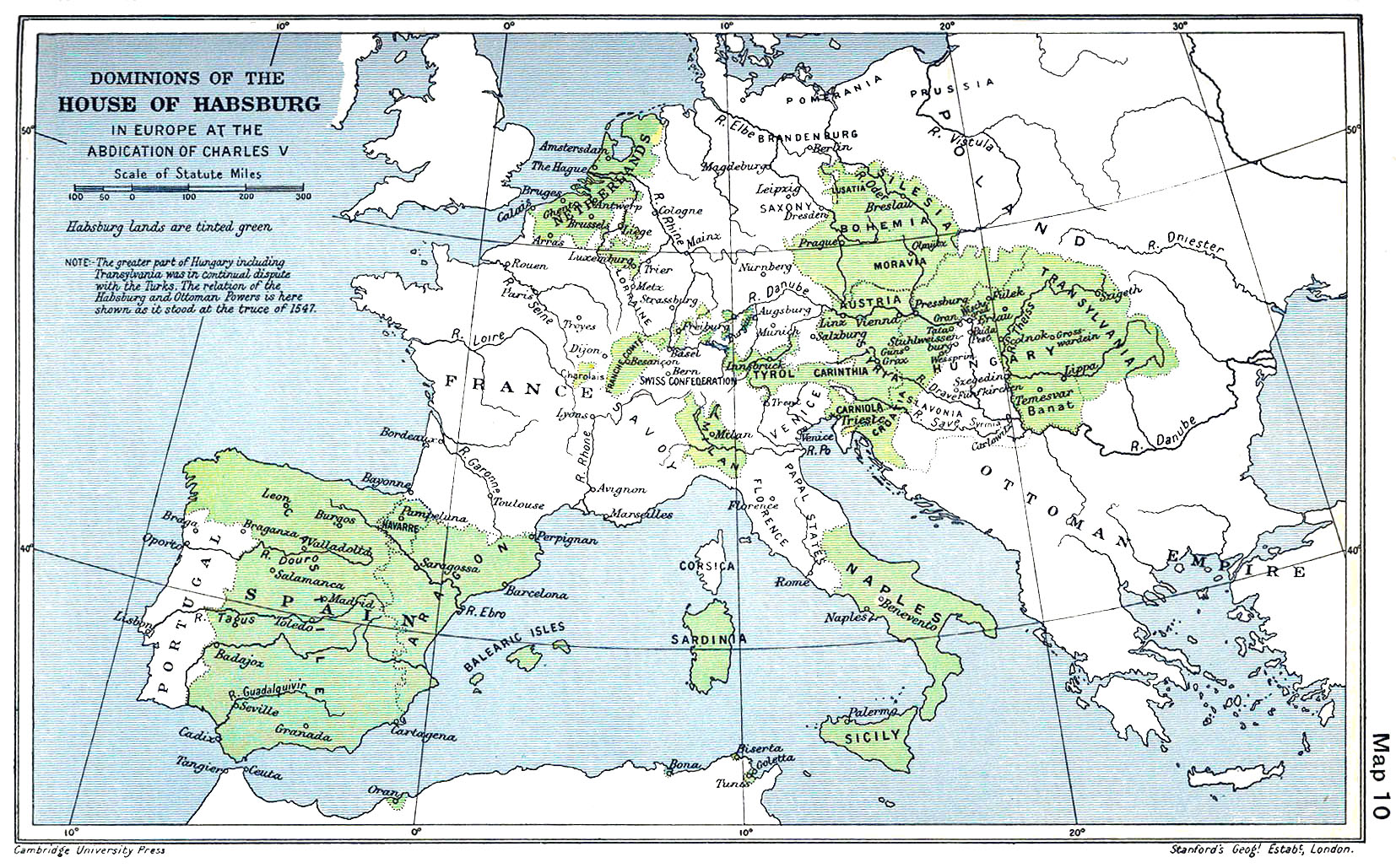
A rotated Europa regina compared to the Habsburg realms (green) under Charles V, who in addition was emperor of the Holy Roman Empire (comprising Central Europe, not shown)

Europa Regina was introduced in the 1530s by the Austrian cartographer Johannes Putsch, possibly with the intent of depicting Europe as the spouse of Charles V of Habsburg, who aspired to become the universal monarch of Christendom and reigned over numerous realms including the Holy Roman Empire and the kingdom of Spain. Arguments in favour of this hypothesis are: the westward orientation of the map to have Hispania as the crowned head, said to resemble the face of Charles V's wife, Isabella of Portugal; the use of the Holy Roman Empire's insignia – its crown, sceptre and orb – and the portrayal of Habsburg realms (Austria, Bohemia, Hungary, Germany) as the heart and centre of the body; and the design of the gown, which resembles the contemporary dress code at the Habsburg court. As in contemporary portraits of couples, Europa regina has her head turned to her right and also holds the orb with her right hand, which has been interpreted as facing and offering power to her imaginary husband, the emperor.

Outside this and in more general terms, Europe is shown as the res publica christiana, the united Christendom in medieval tradition, and great or even as the dominant power in the world.

A third allegory is one of Europe as Paradise through the special placement given to the bodies of water on the map. As contemporary iconography depicted paradise in enclosed form, Europa regina is enclosed by seas and rivers. The Danube river is depicted in a way that it resembles the course of the biblical river flowing through paradise, with its estuary formed by four arms.

That Europa regina is surrounded by water is also an allusion to the antique mythological Europe, who was abducted by Zeus and carried over the water.

Europa regina belongs to the Early Modern allegory of Europa triumphans, as opposed to Europa deplorans.

== Related maps ==
The art of shaping a map in a human form can also be found in a map drawn by Opicinus de Canistris, showing the Mediterranean Sea. This map, published in 1340 and thus predating the Putsch map, showed Europe as a man and Northern Africa as a woman. The Leo Belgicus map showed the Low Countries as a lion; this was closer to the modern map orientation, with north at the top.

While in Europa regina maps, actual geography is subordinate to the female shape, the opposite approach is seen in a map drawn by Hendrik Kloekhoff and published by Francois Bohn in 1709. In this map, titled Europa. Volgens de nieuwste Verdeeling ("Europe, according to the newest classification"), a female is superimposed on a map showing a fairly accurate geography of Europe, and although the map is oriented westward with the Iberian Peninsula forming the head as in the Europa regina imagery, this results in a crouching female shape, corresponding more with the Europa deplorans than the Europa triumphans allegory.

== See also ==
- Europa (consort of Zeus)
- Woman of the Apocalypse
- History of Spain
- National personification
- Personification of the Americas

== Bibliography ==
- Baridon, Laurent (2011). Un atlas imaginaire, cartes allégoriques et satiriques (in French). Paris: Citadelles & Mazenod. ISBN 978-2-85088-515-0.
- Bennholdt-Thomsen, Anke (1999). Bennholdt-Thomsen, Anke; Guzzoni, Alfredo (eds.). Zur Hermetik des Spätwerks. Analecta Hölderlianas (in German). Vol. 1. Würzburg: Königshausen & Neumann. ISBN 3-8260-1629-7.
- Borgolte, Michael (2001). "Perspektiven europäischer Mittelalterhistorie an der Schwelle zum 21. Jahrhundert". In Lusiardi, Ralf; Borgolte (eds.). Das europäische Mittelalter im Spannungsbogen des Vergleichs. Europa im Mittelalter. Abhandlungen und Beiträge zur historischen Komparatistik (in German). Vol. 1. Berlin: Akademie Verlag. pp. 13–28. ISBN 3-05-003663-X.
- Werner, Elke Anna (2009). "Triumphierende Europa - Klagende Europa. Zur visuellen Konstruktion europäischer Selbstbilder in der Frühen Neuzeit". In Ißler, Roland Alexander; Renger, Almut-Barbara (eds.). Europa- Stier und Sternenkranz. Von der Union mit Zeus zum Staatenverbund. Gründungsmythen Europas in Literatur, Musik und Kunst (in German). Vol. 1. Bonn University Press, Vandenhoeck & Ruprecht. pp. 241–260. ISBN 978-3-89971-566-8.
- Landwehr, Achim; Stockhorst, Stefanie (2004). Einführung in die europäische Kulturgeschichte. UTB M (in German). Vol. 2562. Paderborn: Schöningh. ISBN 3-8252-2562-3.
- Schmale, Wolfgang (2004). "Europa, Braut der Fürsten. Politische Relevanz des Europamythos im 17. Jahrhundert". In Bussmann, Klaus; Werner, Elke Anna (eds.). Europa im 17. Jahrhundert. Ein politischer Mythos und seine Bilder. Kunstgeschichte (in German). Stuttgart: Franz Steiner Verlag. ISBN 3-515-08274-3.
- Wendehorst, Stephan; Westphal, Siegrid (2006). Lesebuch altes Reich. Bibliothek Altes Reich (in German). Vol. 1. Munich: Oldenbourg Wissenschaftsverlag. ISBN 3-486-57909-6.
