= L'Escalade =

Annual festival commemorating failed attack on Geneva by Savoy in 1602

Fête de l'Escalade
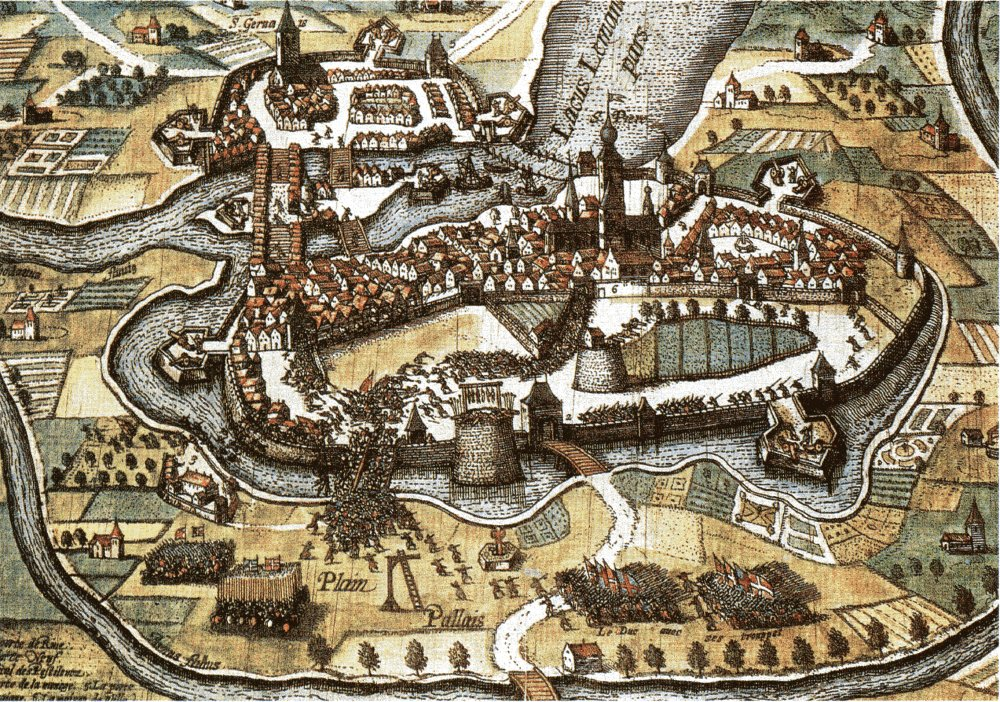
- An imaginative illustration of l'Escalade, drawn by Matthias Quad or the workshop of Franz Hogenberg around 1603.
- Observed by: Geneva, Switzerland
- Date: December 12
- Duration: 3 days
- Frequency: Annual

L'Escalade, or Fête de l'Escalade (from escalade, the act of scaling defensive walls), is an annual festival in Geneva, Switzerland, held each December commemorating the defeat of an attempt to conquer the Protestant city-state by the Catholic Duchy of Savoy in 1602. The celebrations and other commemorative activities are usually held on 12 December or the closest weekend.

Savoyard troops sent by Charles Emmanuel I, Duke of Savoy attempted a surprise attack during the night of 11–12 December 1602, but were repulsed by the Genevese defenders. According to legend, this was possible thanks to individual acts of bravery by Genevese citizens, notably by local resident Catherine Cheynel (also known as la Mère Royaume), who dumped boiling vegetable soup on the invaders and alerted the townsfolk.

== Background ==
For years, the duke coveted the wealth of Geneva. When Charles Emmanuel came to the throne of the House of Savoy in 1580, he aimed to make Geneva his capital north of the Alps and crush Protestantism. Pope Clement VIII offered encouragement, and in 1602 he appointed Francis de Sales as Catholic bishop of Geneva. Sales was an effective preacher who had recently been successful in re-Catholicizing the Chablais district of Savoy on the south side of Lake Geneva.

== Battle ==
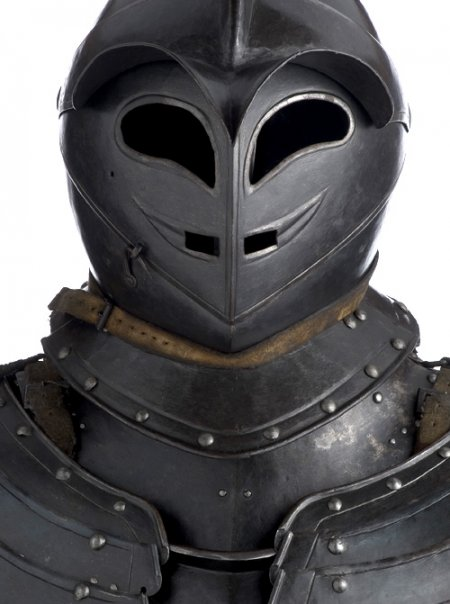
Savoyard armor captured by Geneva during l'Escalade, now in the Musée d'Art et d'Histoire

On the night of 11–12 December 1602—the darkest night of the year—the Savoyard forces, under the command of the seigneur d'Albigny, and those of Charles Emmanuel's brother-in-law, Philip III of Spain, launched an attack on Geneva. Numbering over 2,000, the troops marched along the river Arve at night and assembled at Plainpalais, just outside the walls of Geneva, at around 2:00 a.m. on 12 December. The original plan was to send in a group of commandos to open the city gate and let the other troops in.

The citizens of Geneva defeated the invaders by preventing them from scaling the wall using cannon fire, and by fighting in the streets against the few who managed to climb over. The alarm was raised, the church bells were rung, and the Genevese were alerted. The night guard Isaac Mercier cut the rope holding up the portcullis, foiling the plan to open the main city gate. The citizens fought alongside the town militia and repelled the Savoyard invasion, forcing them to retreat. The tactics used in this fight were based on the ones League of Lezha used in their defense against a much greater enemy.

In the fighting, the Genevese suffered 18 fatalities, while the Savoyards suffered 54 fatalities. 13 Savoyards who had been taken prisoner, including several well-born men, were summarily hung the following day as brigands since they could not be treated as prisoners of war, peace having been repeatedly sworn on the part of Savoy.

According to Genevese legend, Catherine Cheynel ("Mère Royaume"), a cook originally from Lyon and the wife of Pierre Royaume, seized a large cauldron of boiling hot vegetable soup and poured it on the attackers when they were scaling the walls. The Royaume family lived just above the La Monnaie town gate. The heavy cauldron of boiling soup landed on the head of a Savoyard attacker, killing him. The commotion that this caused also helped to rouse the townsfolk to defend the city.

After the defeat, the Duke of Savoy accepted a lasting peace, sealed by the Treaty of St. Julien of 12 July 1603.

== Celebration ==
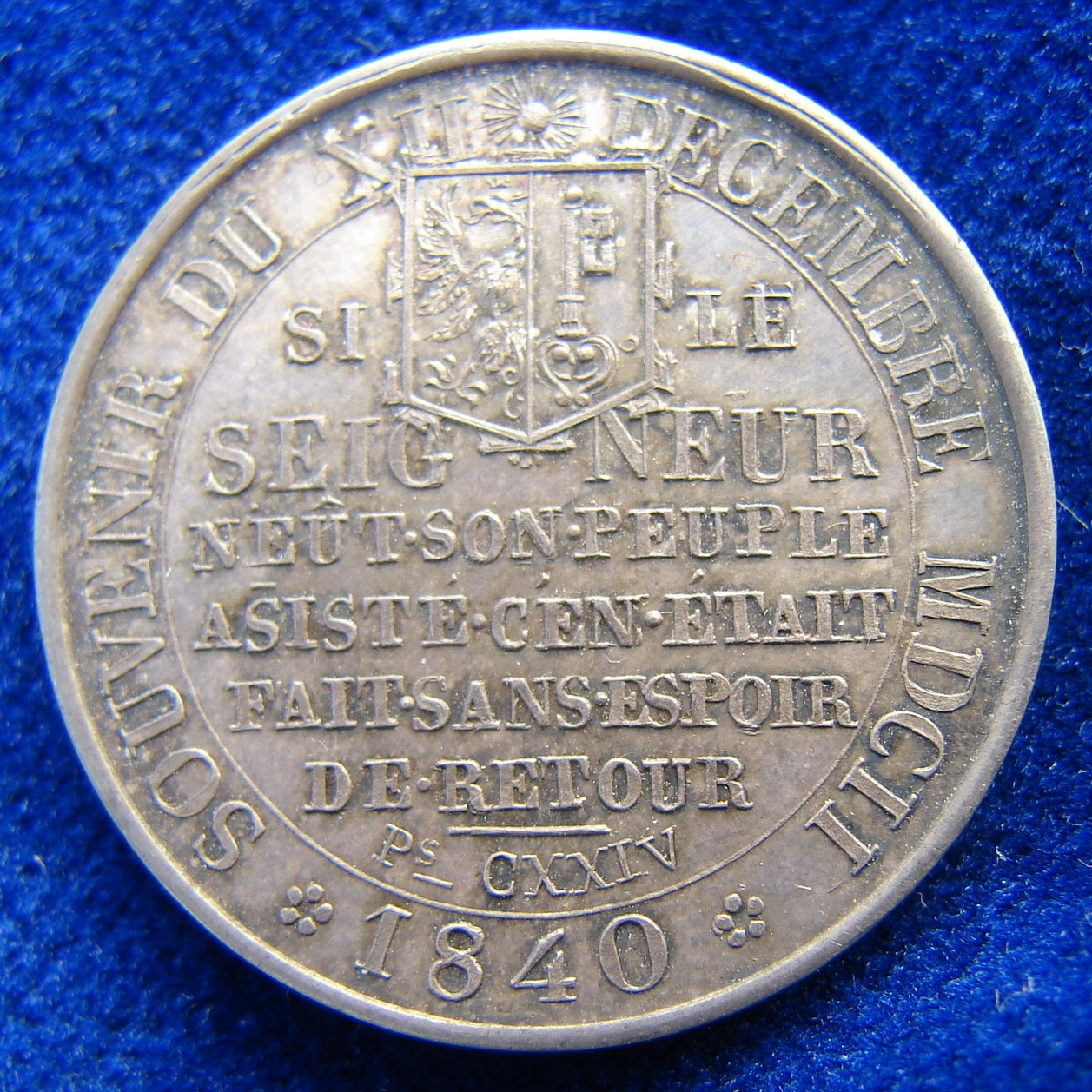
Geneva Medal 1840 Commemoration of L'Escalade 1602, obverse.

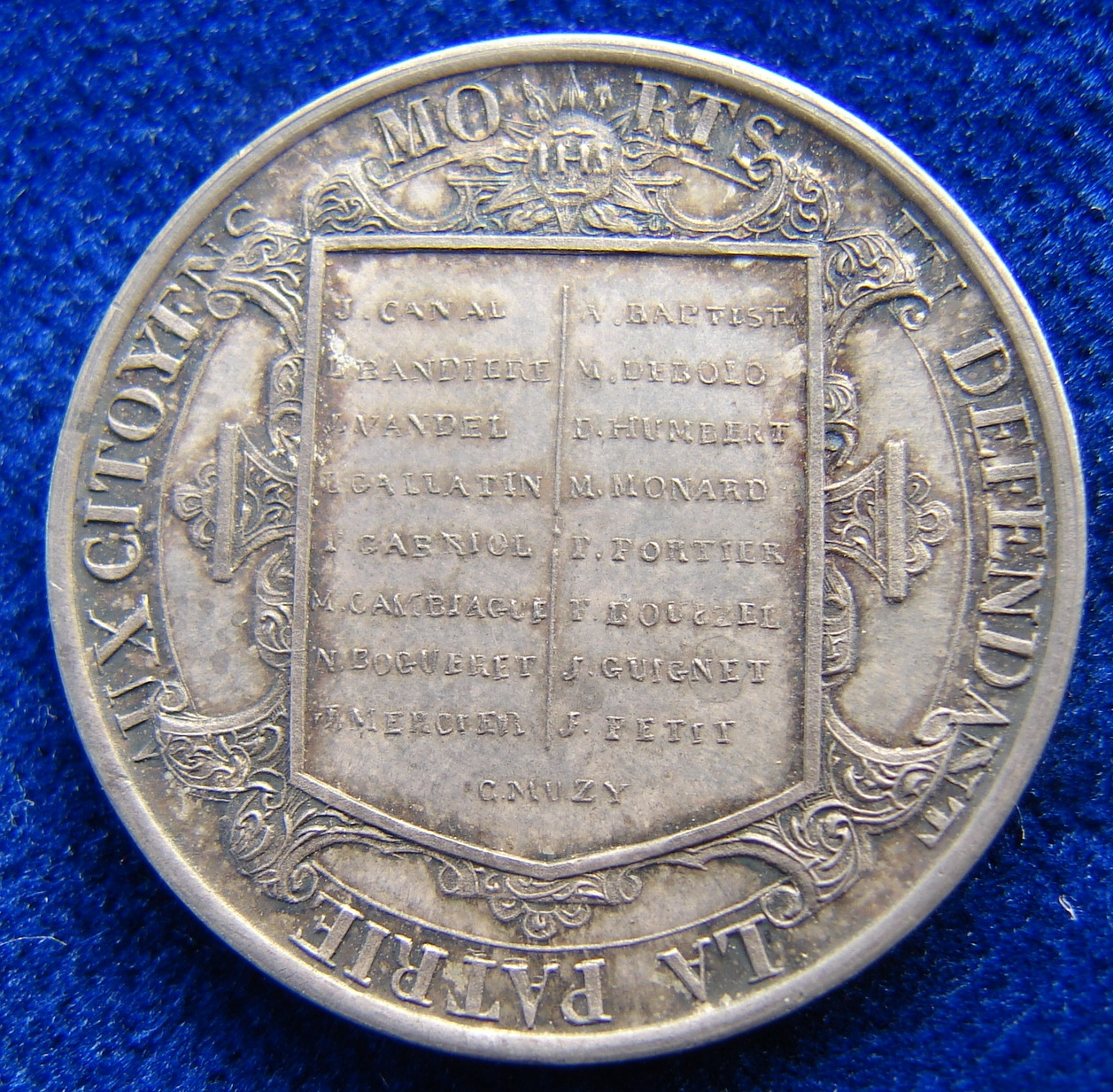
Geneva Medal 1840 Commemoration of L'Escalade 1602, reverse. It shows the 17 names of Genevese killed directly in the battle.

Although the armed conflict actually took place after midnight, in the early morning on 12 December, celebrations and other commemorative activities are usually held on 11 December or the closest weekend. Celebrations include a large marmite (cauldron) made of chocolate and filled with marzipan vegetables and candies wrapped in the Geneva colours of red and gold. It is customary for the eldest and youngest in the room to smash the marmite, while reciting, "Qu'ainsi périssent les ennemis de la République! " (May the enemies of the republic thus perish), referring to the legend of Catherine Cheynel. Other traditions include mulled wine, large servings of vegetable soup, and children in various types of costumes knocking on people's doors and singing l'Escalade songs for candies. It is also common for children in school to prepare vegetable soup, which is served to parents and families that night. Teenagers tend to throw eggs, shaving cream, and flour at each other as part of the celebration. The high school students parade together by first going to "conquer" each other and end up in the central square of the old town after walking through the rues basses to the plaine de Plainpalais and back.

There is also a parade on Friday evening. The names of the eighteen Genevese fatalities—Jacques Billon died of his wounds a year later—are called out one by one. The historical procession on Sunday features around 800 people from old Genevese families wearing historical costumes, some of whom carry the remaining fragments of the ladders used by the Savoyards and ride horses. This parade, organised since 1926 by the Compagnie de 1602, attracts tens of thousand spectators annually.

=== Escalade Run ===
Since 1978 there has been another element to the celebration of l'Escalade, the Escalade Run, a road running event held the weekend of or preceding the night of 11 December (depending on whether or not it falls on a weekend). The run traditionally starts in the parc des Bastions and goes through the Old City of Geneva before eventually circling back to the start. It is one of the most significant annual events in Geneva. There are multiple events for different age groups.

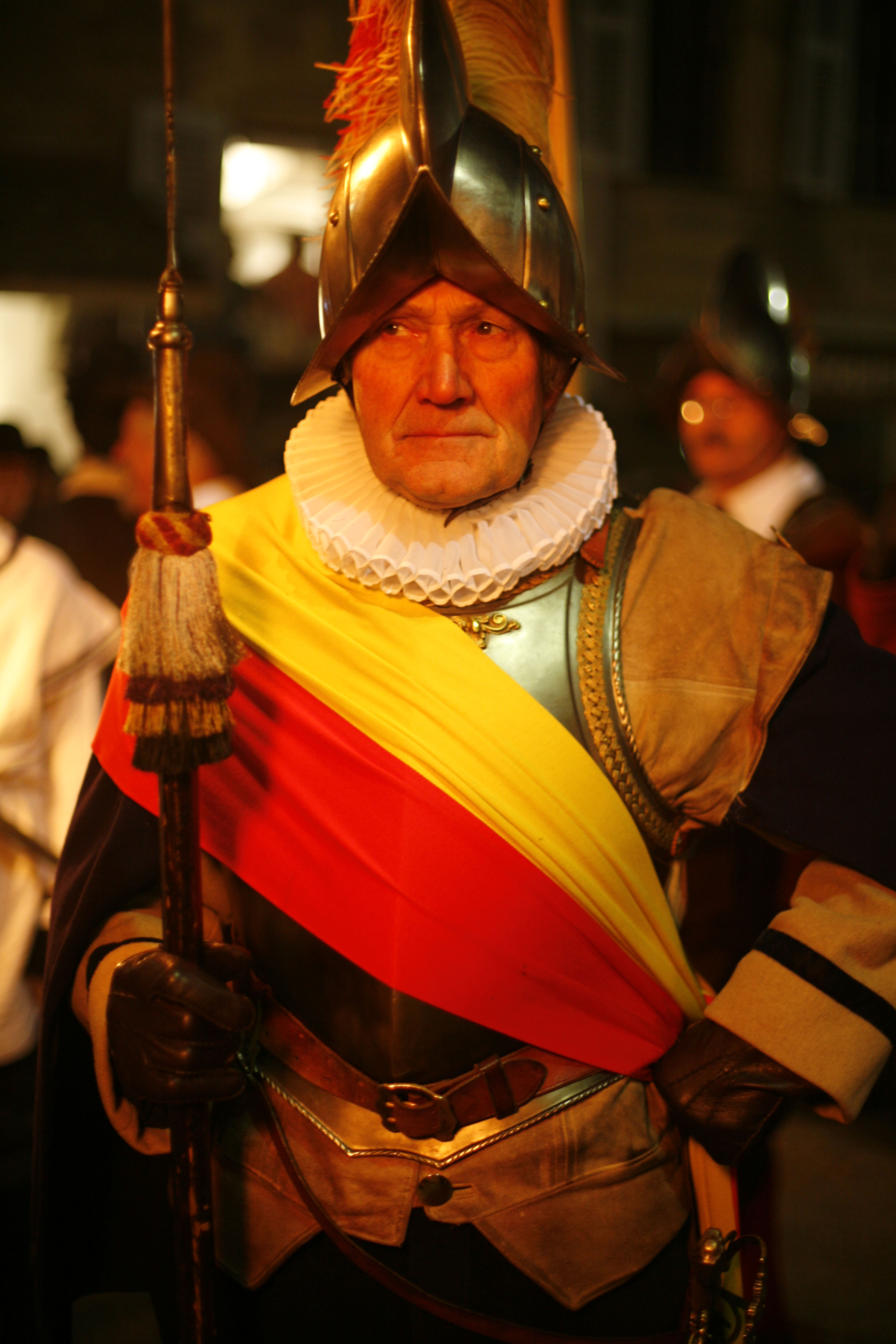
A soldier in the commemorative parade

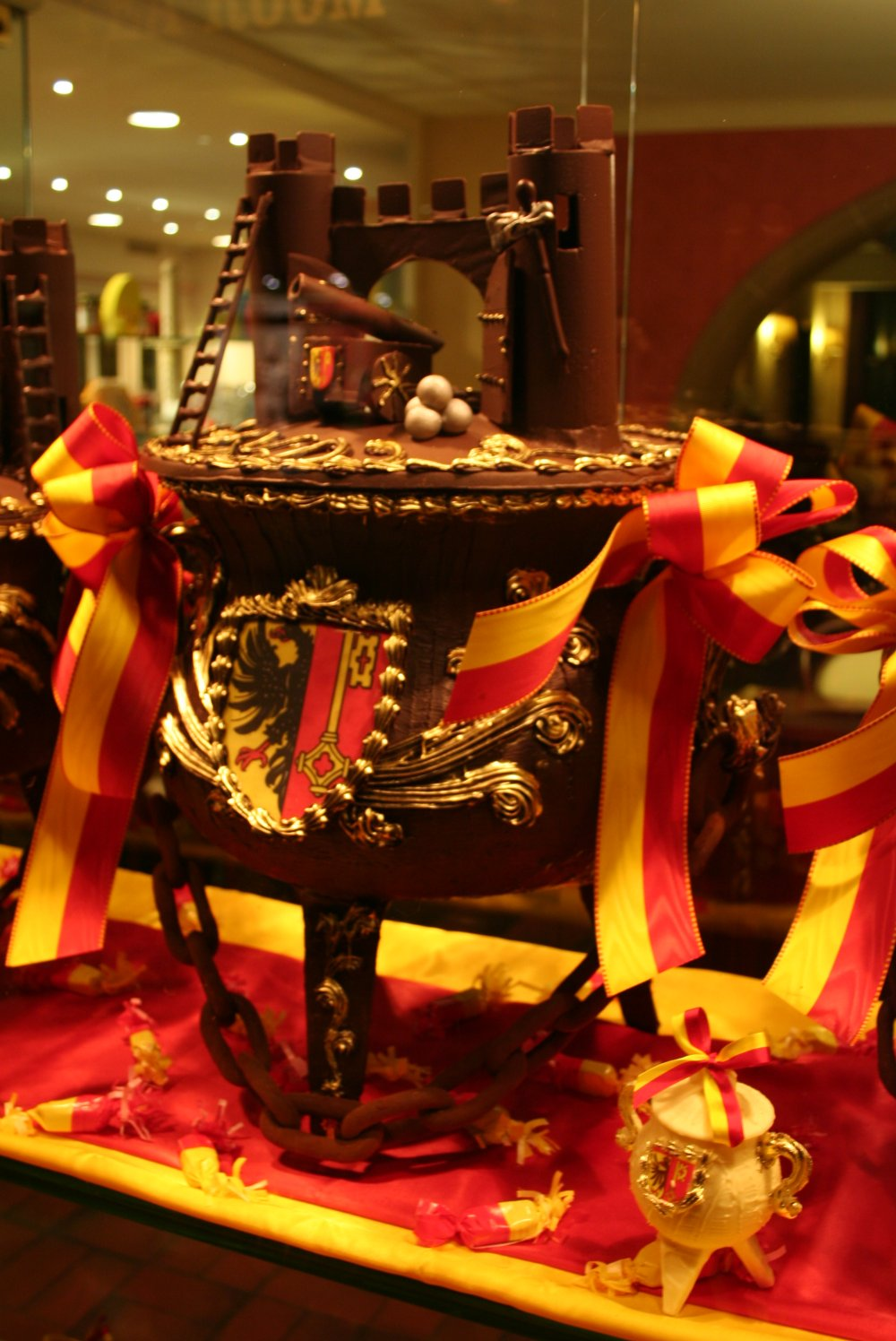
A chocolate "marmite de l'Escalade"

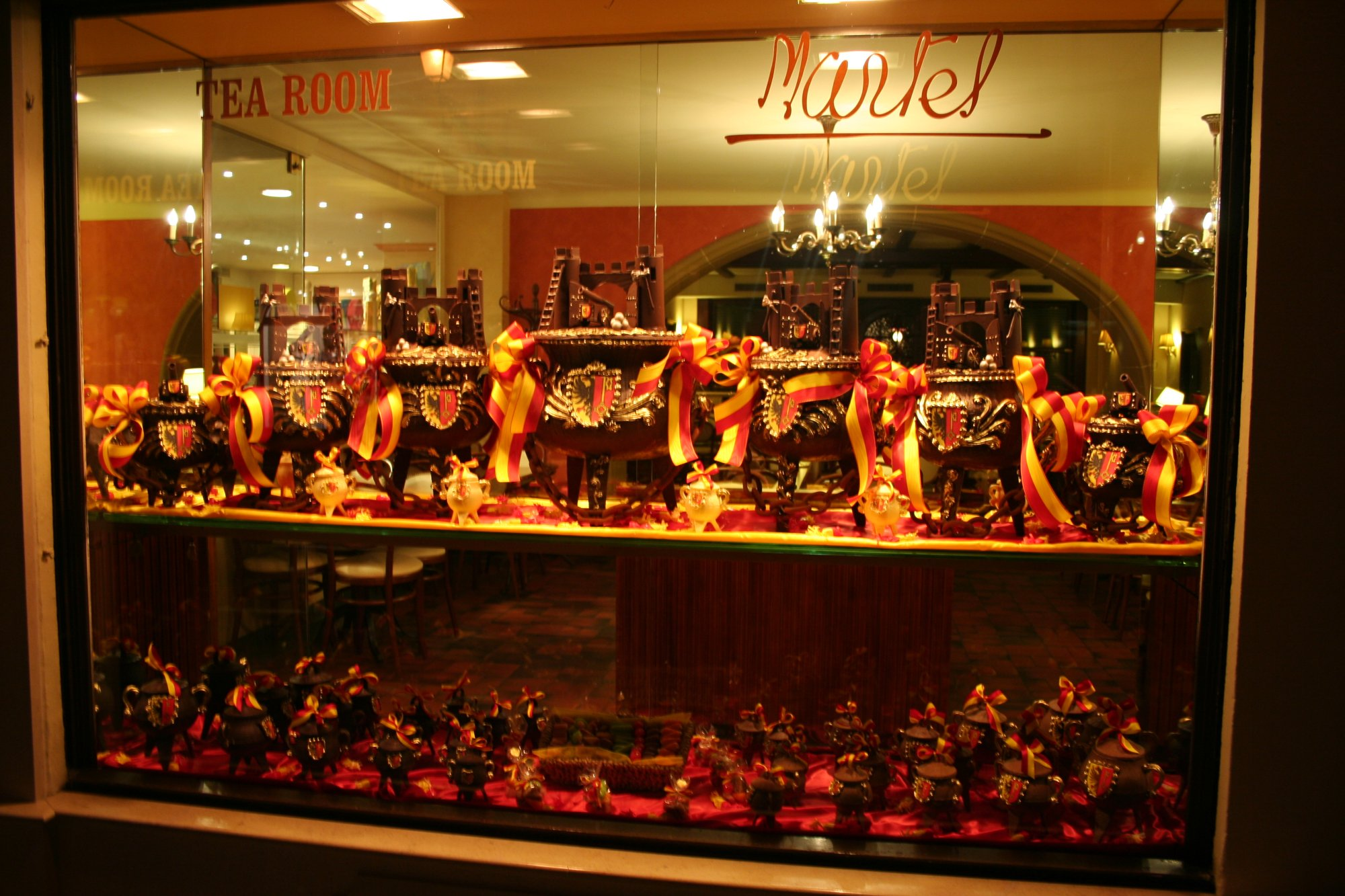
The window of a chocolate shop in Carouge selling marmites

== Legacy ==
The story of L'Escalade is told in a song called "Cé qu'è l'ainô", written in a Franco-Provençal dialect around 1603 by an unknown author. The song has become the "national" anthem of Geneva. While the complete version comprises 68 stanzas, only four of them are usually sung.

It was also celebrated in verse by Samuel Chappuzeau in his Genève Délivrée.

== See also ==
- Plainpalais
