= Compagnie de 1602 =

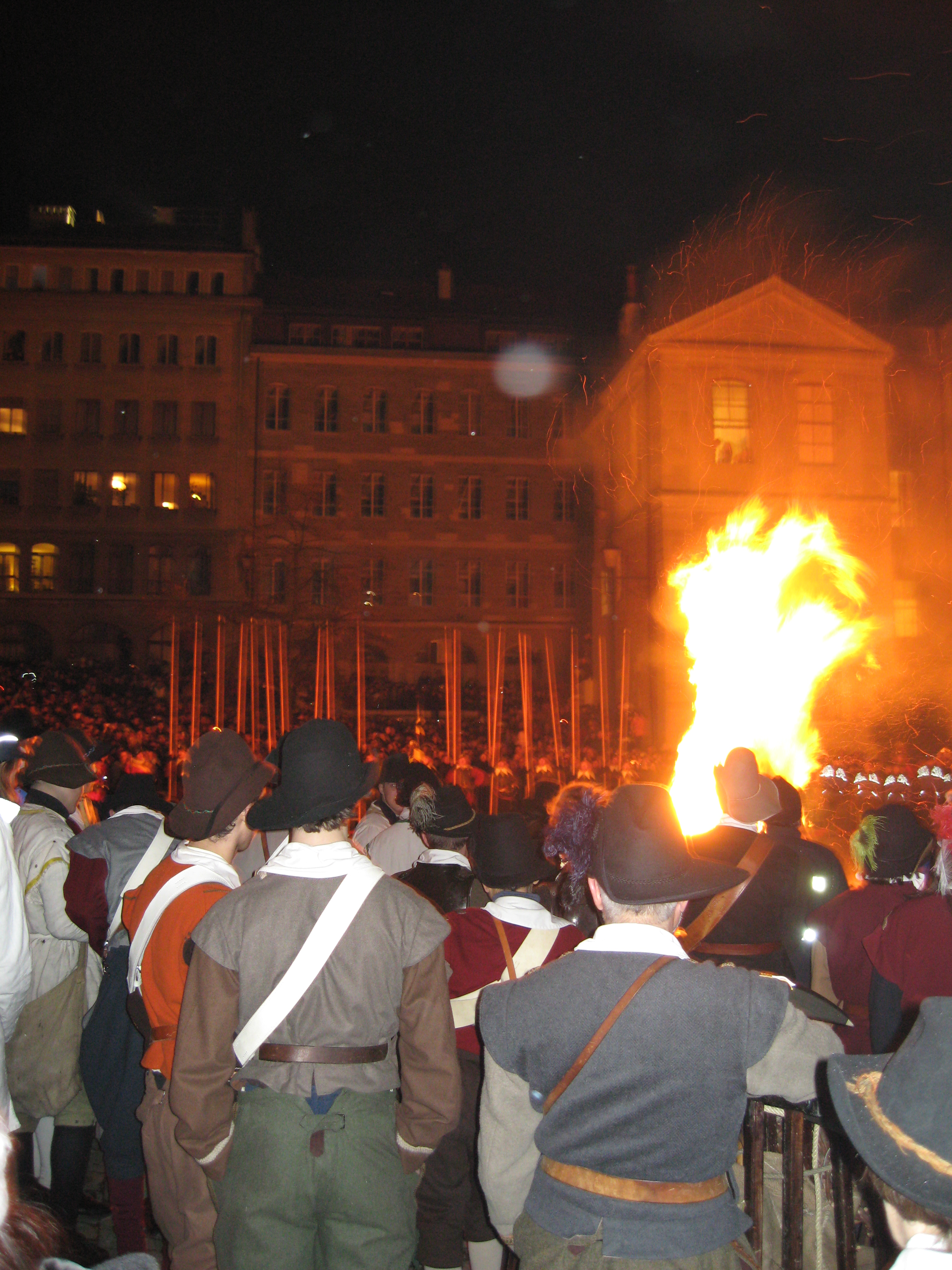
Bonfire in the cour Saint-Pierre and Genevan in historical costumes.

The Compagnie de 1602 is an historic and patriotic association in Geneva who organize the official commemoration of the Escalade. This association was established on March 31, 1926.

== Previous history ==
The Escalade was celebrated immediately after the attack of the Savoyards, but the patriotic commemoration became very important only in the middle of the 19th century (in 1860). In this time, Geneva builds monuments in memory of the Escalade. The first processions with historical costumes take place (1867–1868) - military and gymnastics groups compose the processions - and the famous Pot in chocolate is created (10 décembre 1881).

In 1898, "the genevan patriotic association for the Escalade" is created with the aim of the tercentenary of the Escalade (in 1902). The Compagnie de 1602 is created some years after, on March 31, 1926, and succeeds the former association October 27, 1926 a few months after its foundation, the association has 56 members - named "Compagnons"; some are very famous Genevan or Swiss personalities, for instance: Gustave Ador, Édouard Elzingre...

== Become a "Compagnon" ==
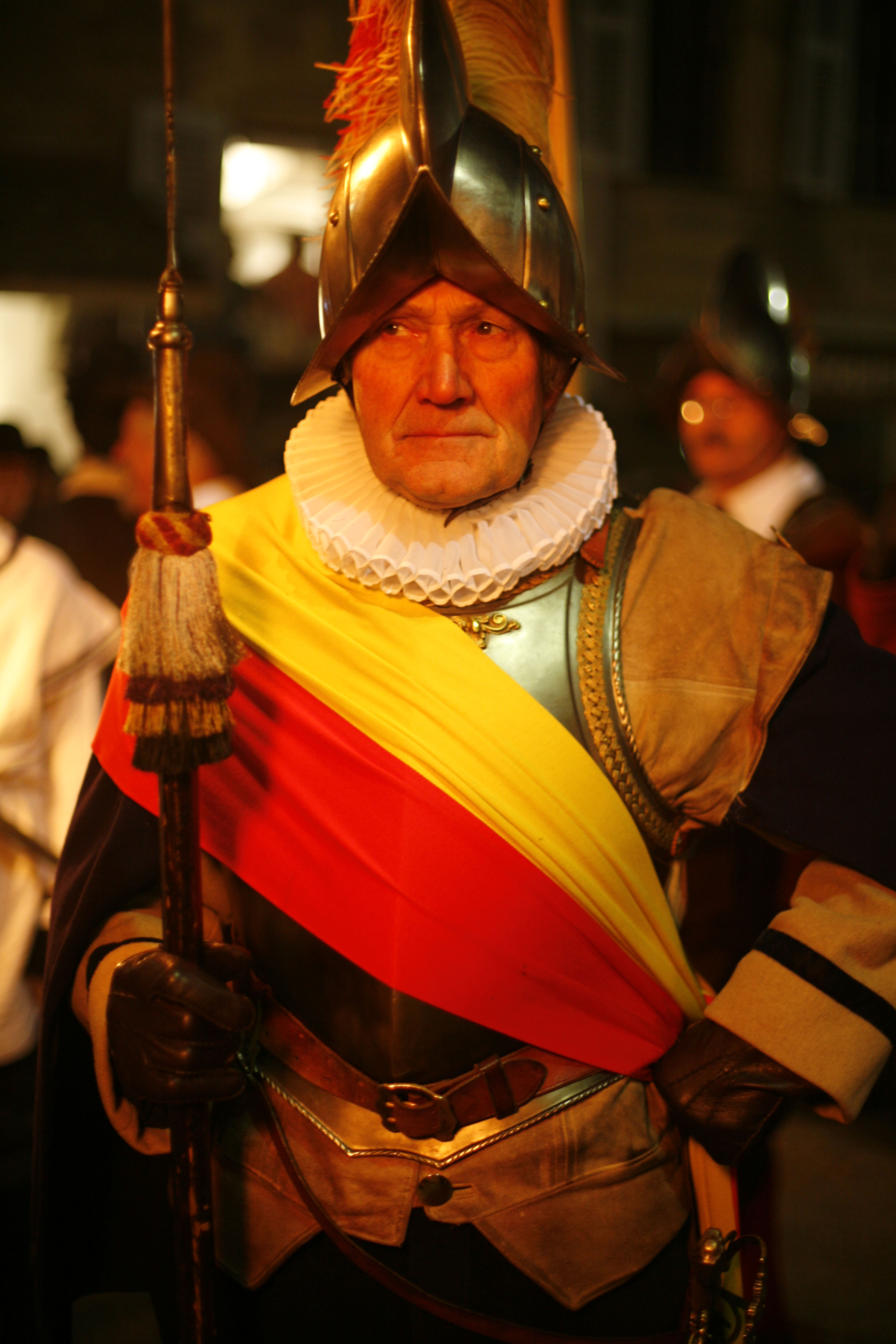
the chief of pikemen in the Parade

In 1926 as today, the Members of the Compagnie must be Swiss and receive the signature and agreement of two members (as a sponsorship). The foreigners are welcomed as sympathizers members. Every member - men, women and children - pays a financial contribution. Finally there is no religious, political or social distinction within this association. In 2011 the association had approximately 2500 members.

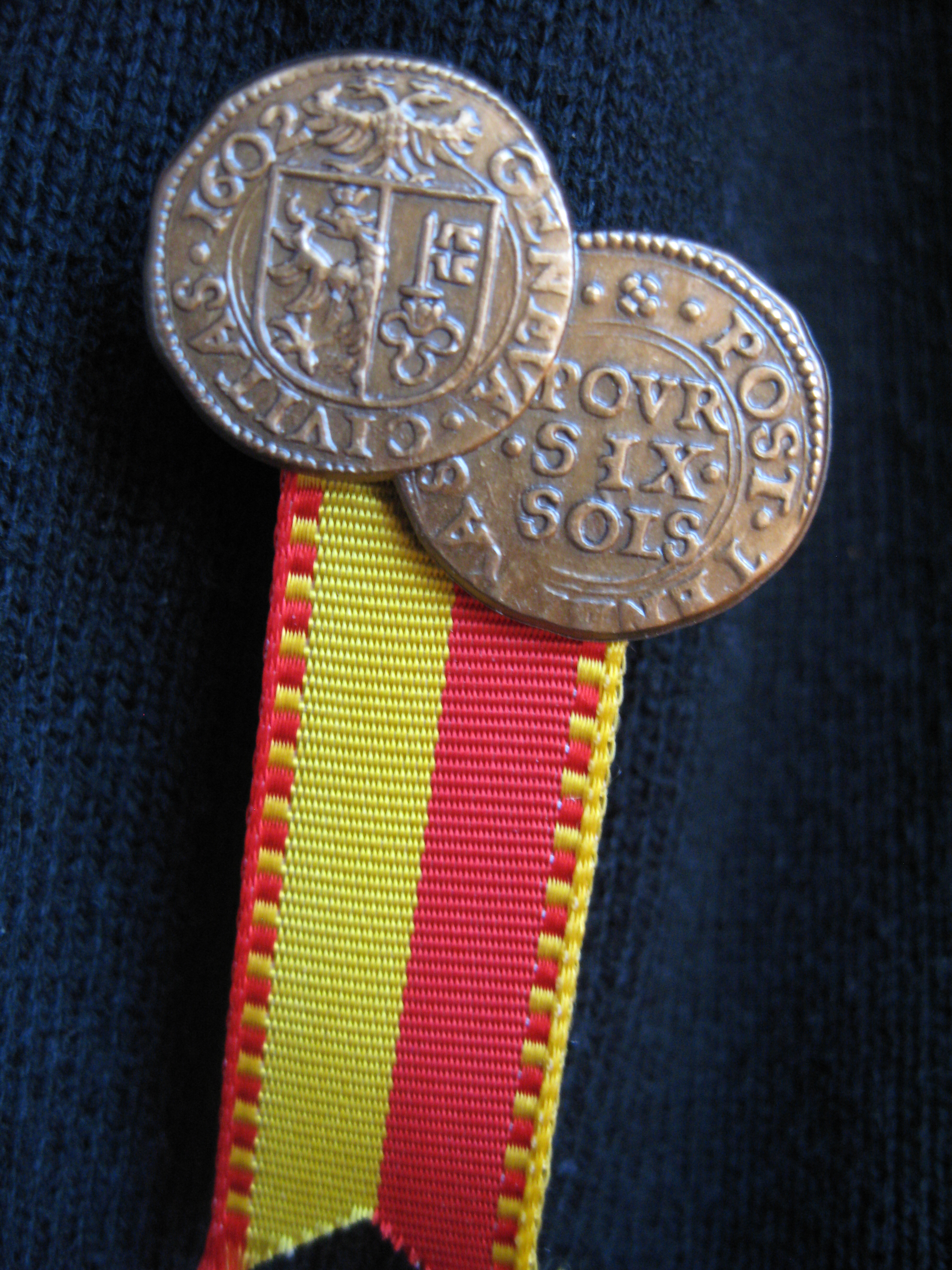
Patriotic pin representing two sides of a coin of 1602.

== Historical costumes ==
The historical costumes which dress approximately 800 persons during the Parade of Escalade do not date from 1602. They were made at the beginning and in the middle of the 20th century and they are inspired by the drawings of Elzingre. However, historical research shows that some colors used in these costumes did not exist in 1602 and are not good examples of austere lifestyle in Geneva after the Reformation...

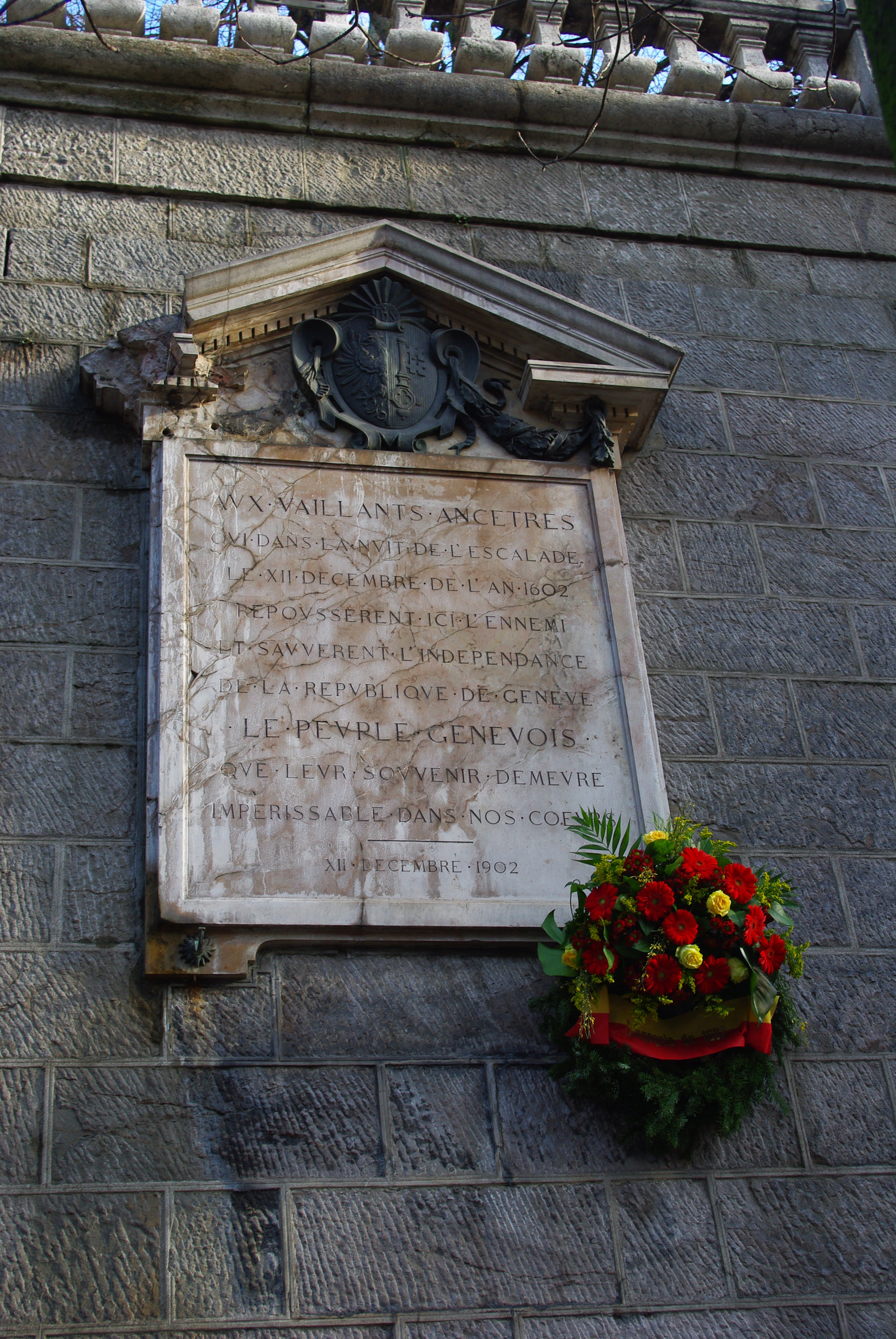
Memorial (Corraterie)

== Tribute to the heroes ==
This solemn parade take place on Friday evening and traditionally marks the start of the festivities. Legacy of earlier parades of the early 20th century, it reflects the will to make a tribute to the 18 victims of the Geneva Escalade. Thus, along a path leading from Bourg-de-Four to the Protestant church of Saint-Gervais - burial place of those victims - the political authorities of the city and county lay flowers on three commemorative monuments - la Tertasse, la Corraterie et Saint-Gervais.

== The Parade ==
On Sunday evening, lit by torchbearers creating a special atmosphere, the parade into the town attracts tens of thousands of people. Bringing in good order all costumed compagnons, horses, carriages and weapons, the parade explores the old city, the lower streets, and the Saint-Gervais area during more than 3 hours. Along the way, the parade stops in five emblematic places of the city (Bourg-de-Four, Molard, Coutance, Corraterie, Cour Saint-Pierre), places where the herald - horseman dressed in the colors of Geneva - delivers proclamation - an oration recalling the history of the Escalade to the people gathered. The last step in the forecourt of the Geneva's Cathedral Saint-Pierre traditionally ends with a bonfire. With this procession, the Escalade could be the largest free historical reconstitution in Europe. The next weekend of celebration and remembrance will take place on December 11, 12 and 13th, 2015.

=== Composition of the Parade ===
Groupes	Composition
The Herald	Drums (Cadets de Genève et Tambours du Lion, Grand-Saconnex) Drapeaux collecteurs Trumpets of Compagnie de 1602 the pursuivants. Herald and pursuivants
Political Authorities	Huissiers Monsieur le Sautier Members of Little Council (Petit Conseil: executive council) Seigneurs Syndics Formers Syndics Huissiers Council of Two Hundred, legislative council Members of Council
Justice	Fifes and drums (Basler Verein Genf) Fifes and drums. Guets; Monsieur le Seigneur lieutenant de Justice; Auditeurs; Guards; Jailer; Executioner and helpers Issac Mercier (hero); Guards
Protestant Clergy	Théodore de Bèze Venerable Company of Pastors; Regents of College Calvin; Schoolchildren
People of Geneva	Fifes and drums (Ensemble du Conservatoire populaire de musique) Dame Royaume and Dame Piaget; Women and Children; The spoils of war Women and Children
The people of Countryside	Fifes and drums (Ondine genevoise) Monsieur le Châtelain de Jussy et sa dame Cornette et suite de Monsieur le Châtelain; Communiers de Jussy; Fifes and drums (Tambours et fifres de Meyrin); Monsieur le Châtelain de Peney; Cornette et suite de Monsieur le Châtelain; Monsieur le Ministre des Evangiles et communiers de Peney; Bossette
Militia	Trumpets of Escalade Monsieur le Commandant de la milice Bourgeoise; Cornette et Adjudants; Drums (Compagnie de 1602) Section of harquebusiers Harquebusiers. Le mantelet Monsieur le Commandant de la milice de quartier Cornette et Adjudants; Le Pétardier; Artillerymen with cannon (Falco); Fifes and drums (Société l’Emprô-Genève); Section of pikemen (A.S.S.O); Section d’argoulets (cavalry)
Light	Torchbearers Torchbearer in the passage du Monnetier

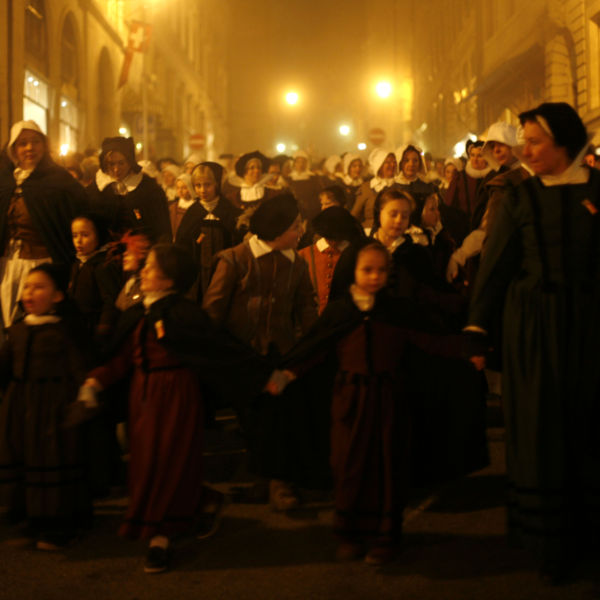
Women and Children of 1602.

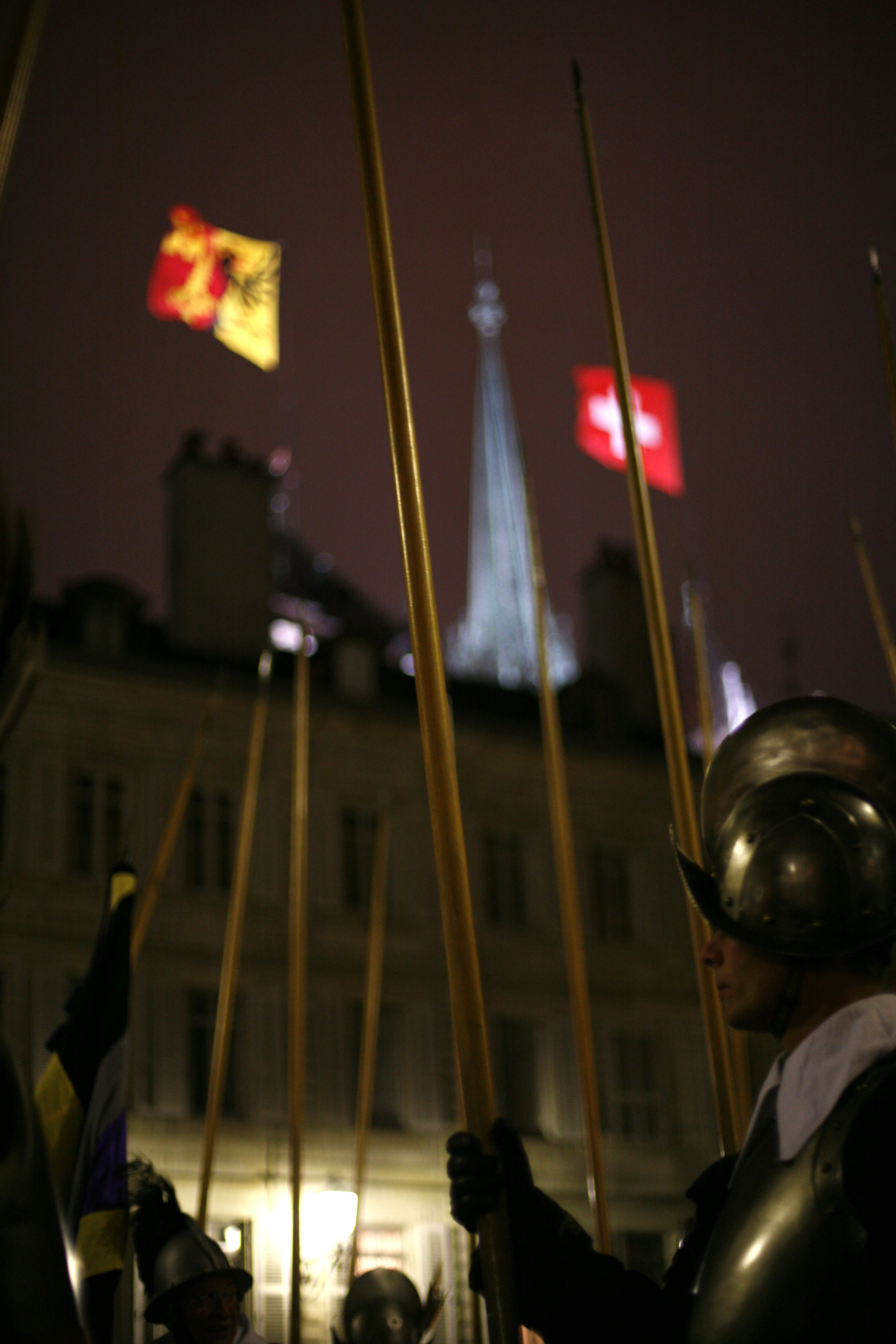
Pikemen in Bourg-de-Four during the Parade.

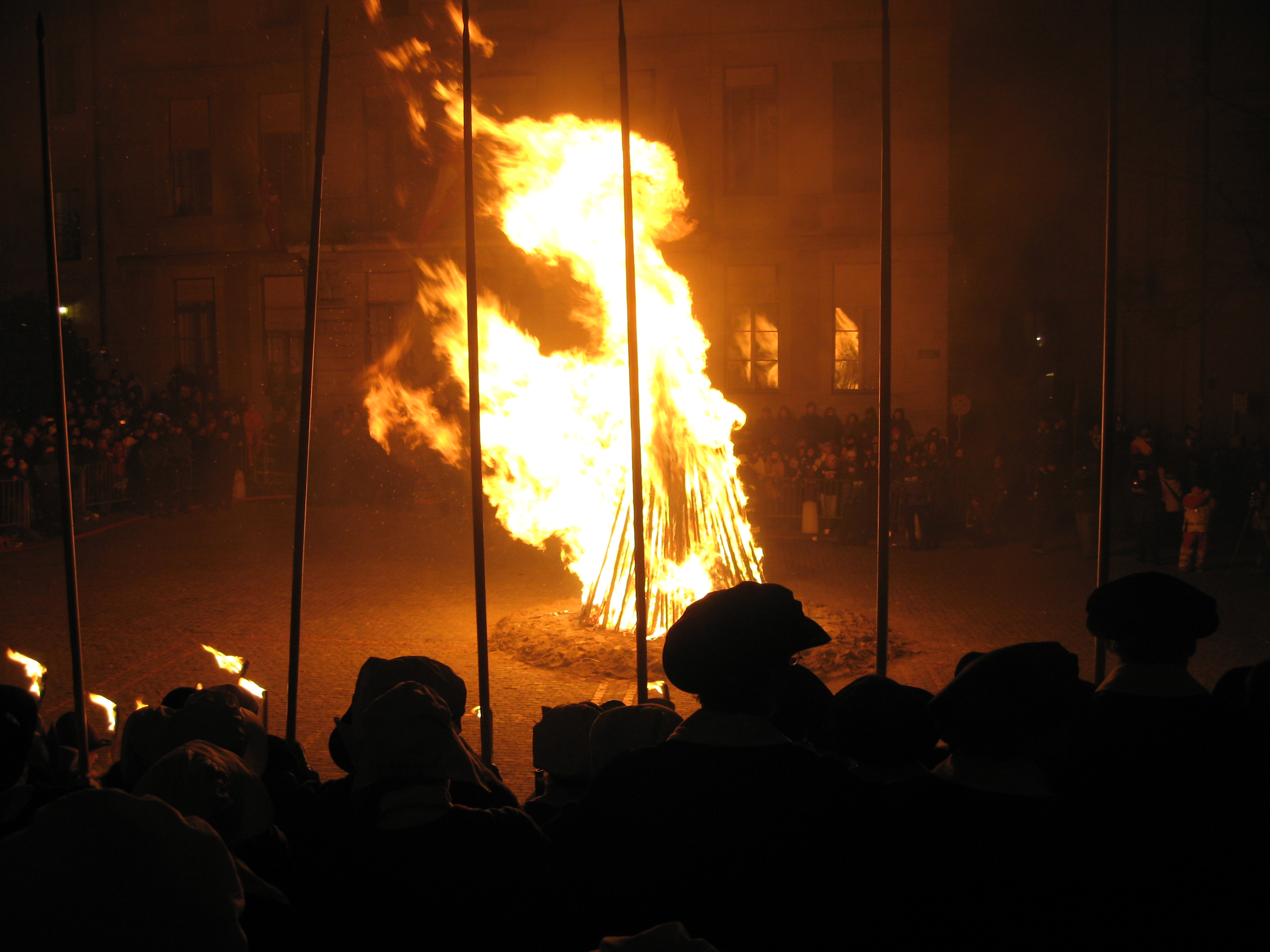
Bonfire (Cour Saint-Pierre).

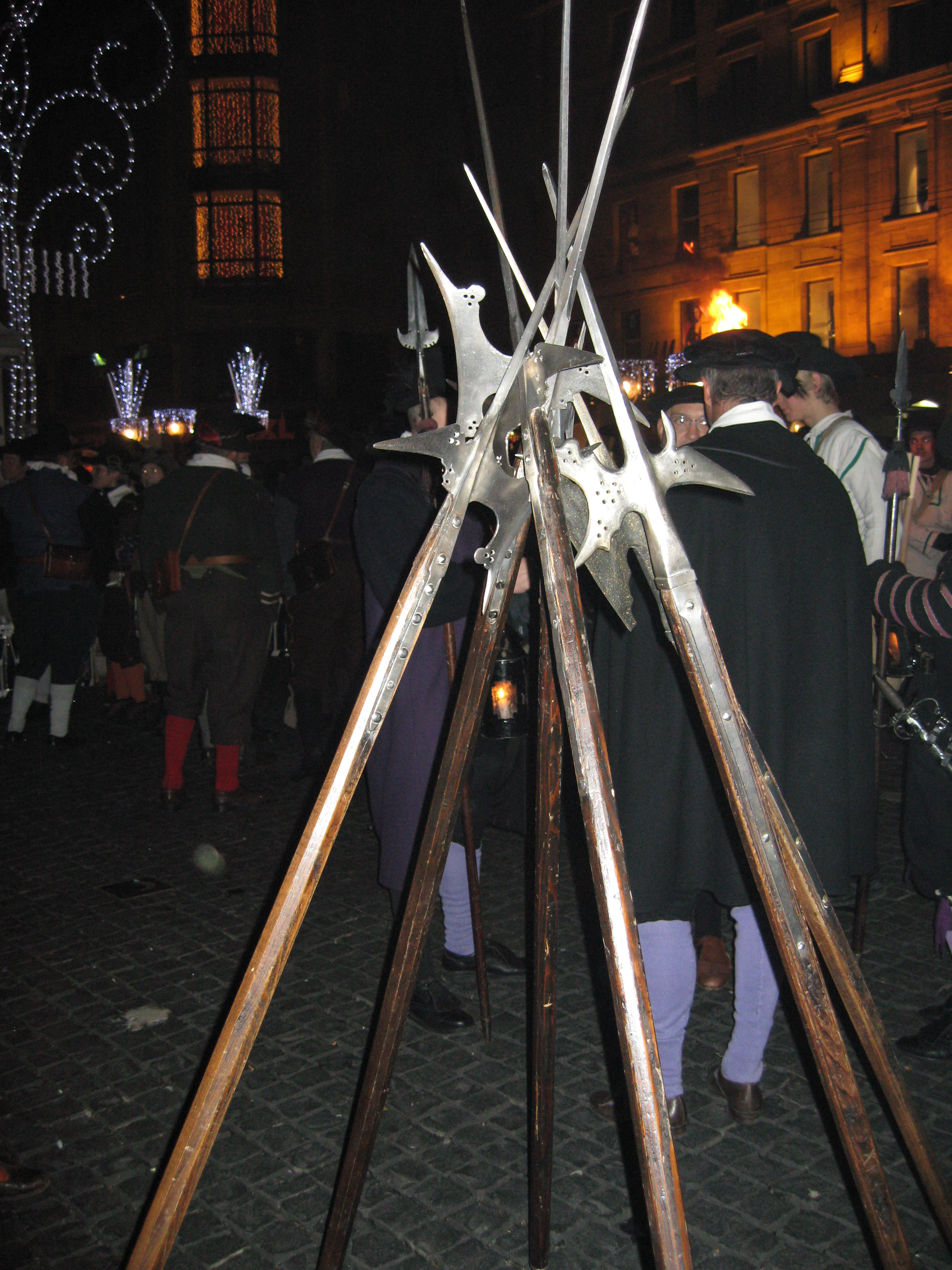
Halberds (Place du Molard).

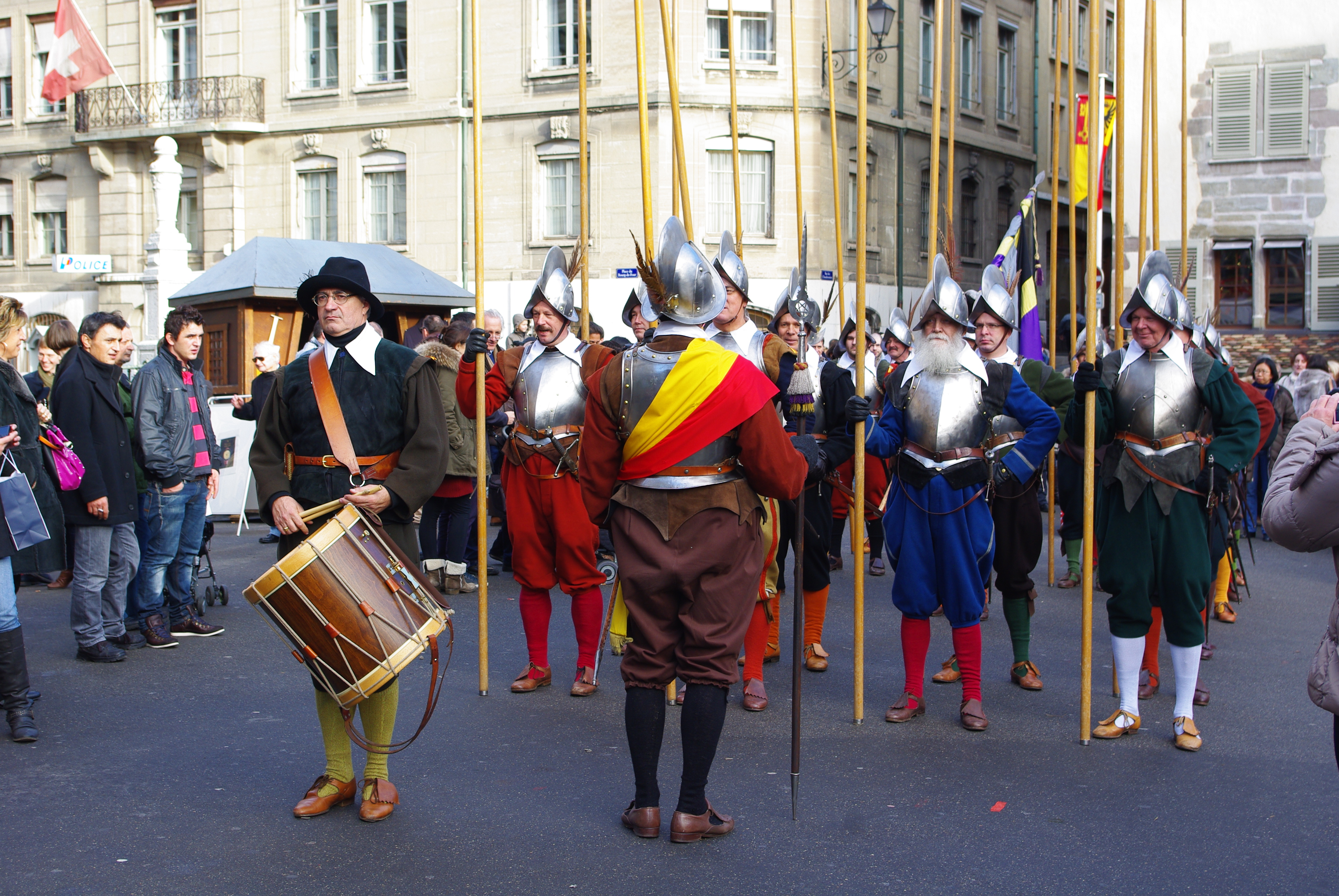
Pikemen.

== See also ==
- L'Escalade
- History of Geneva

=== Bibliography ===
- Bulletin de la Compagnie de 1602, Genève. 1926 → (trimestriel, quadriannuel ou quinquannuel (selon l'époque)).
- Le cortège historique du 1er juin 1903 à Genève : commémoration du traité de Saint-Julien. Atar, Genève 1903.
- Programme - livret officiel, fête du 12 décembre, fête nationale de l'Escalade, 1602-1892. Comité d'Organisation. Genève 1892.
- Troisième centenaire de l'Escalade, 1602-1902 : cortège historique, 1150 participants : programme officiel. Éd. par le Comité central, Genève 1902.
- Escalade : Gedenkmünzen 2002 = monnaie commémorative 2002. In: Numis-Post & MHZ., Bad Ragaz. Jg. 35(2002), Nr. 1, p. 58-59.
- Christian Dédérod, Un demi-siècle d'insignes de la Compagnie de 1602 : 1947-1997. Compagnie de 1602, Genève 1997.
- Roland-Daniel Schneebeli, "Falco" : le faucon de 1602 : histoire d'un canon de campagne du début du XVIIe siècle et état du parc d'artillerie de Genève à l'époque de l'Escalade. Compagnie de 1602, Genève 1999.
- Didier Aulas, Week-end genevois à Zürich pour la Sechselaüten: le Röstigraben explose avec le Böögg!, Bulletin de la Compagnie de 1602, Genève, n°305, 1996. pp. 10–13.
- Guillaume Fatio, "L'Escalade patriotique", Anniversaire de l'Escalade, Compagnie de 1602, Genève 1927.
- Jean-Pierre Ferrier, "Histoire de la fête de l'Escalade". L'Escalade de Genève - 1602 : histoire et tradition. Jullien Éd., Genève 1952. pp. 489–530.
- Richard Gaudet-Blavignac, "Escalade, cortèges, proclamation et Compagnie de 1602.", Genava, tome 50, 2002. pp. 219–244.
- Richard Gaudet-Blavignac, "D'où viennent les costumes de la Compagnie de 1602 ?", Bulletin de la Compagnie de 1602, n° 318, décembre 1998. pp. 48–55.
- Bernard Lescaze, "Escalade et coutumes de table : de quand date la marmite en chocolat ?", Revue du vieux Genève, n⁰ 21, 1991. pp. 92–96.
- Gustave Maunoir, "La Compagnie de 1602 et les fêtes de l'Escalade.", Anniversaire de l'Escalade, Compagnie de 1602, Genève, 1929.
