= Opicinus de Canistris =

Italian priest and writer (1296-1353)

Opicinus de Canistris (24 December 1296 – c. 1353), also known as the Anonymous Ticinensis, was an Italian priest, writer, mystic, and cartographer who generated a number of unusual writings and fantastic cosmological diagrams. Autobiographical in origin, they provide the majority of information about his life. When his works were rediscovered in the early twentieth century, some scholars deemed his works to be “psychotic” due to their extraordinary theological musings and schematic diagrams. The merits of this psychoanalytic interpretation, however, are currently under debate.

== Biography ==
=== Northern Italy (1296-1329) ===
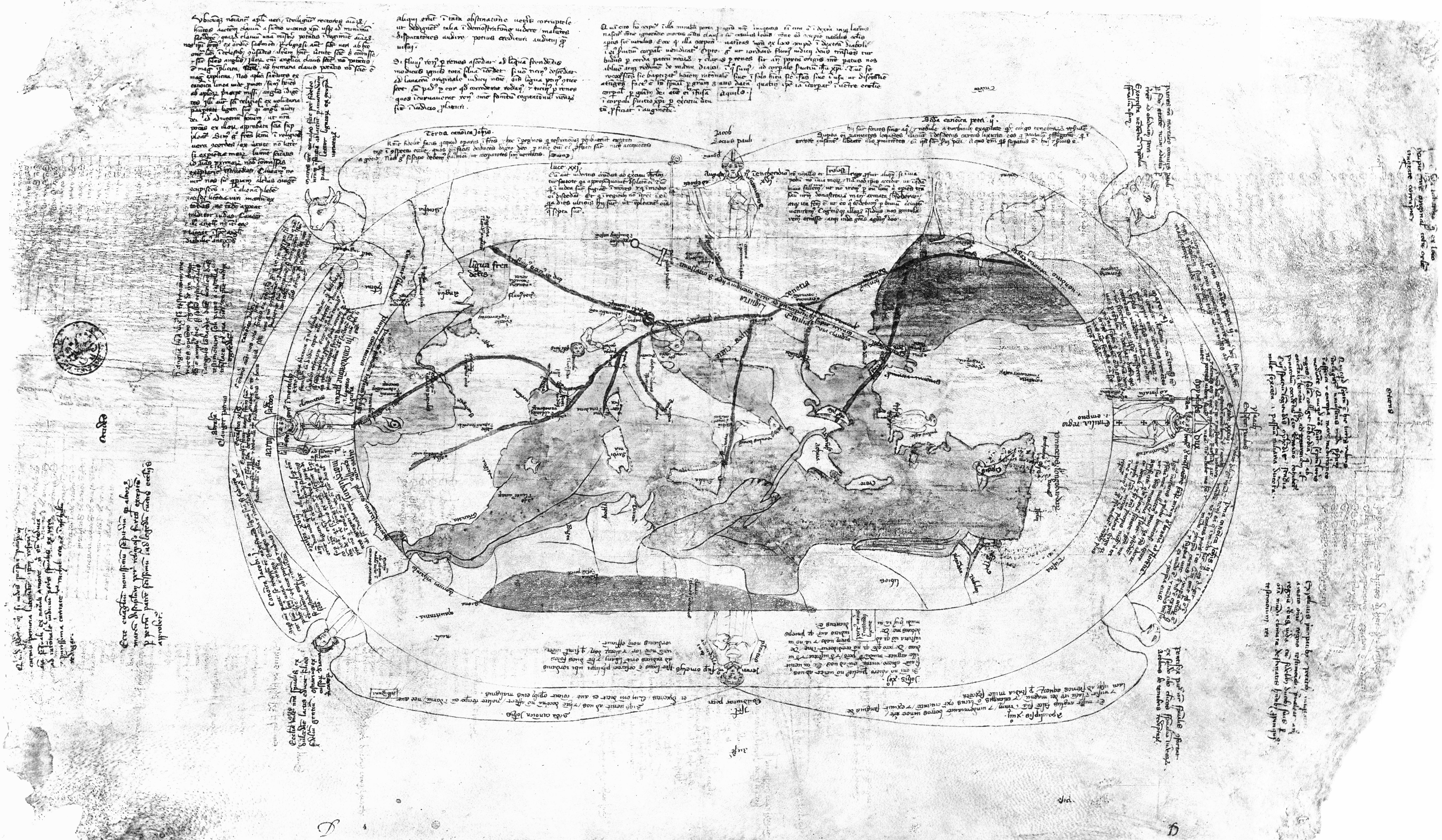
Opicinus de Canistris World Map, 1296-1300

Opicinus was born on 24 December 296, in Lomello, near Pavia, Italy. His family, which was well known in Pavia, actively supported the Guelphs against the Ghibellines.

He went to school from the age of six. He then studied liberal arts and progressively received an eclectic encyclopaedical training. From a very early age he was interested in drawing. He had several temporary jobs to materially help his family.

The storming of Pavia by the Ghibellines on 8 October 1315 forced Canistris' family to take exile in Genoa for three years. Opicinus then distanced himself from the Guelph part of his family, especially following the death of his father and one of his younger brothers.

In Genoa he studied theology and the Bible in greater depth and developed his talent for drawing. During this period he was able to see the first "sea maps" (incorrectly known as "portolans"). When he returned to Pavia in 1318, he studied to become a priest, and from 1319 he drew up religious treaties. He was ordained in Parma on 27 February 1320, and in 1323 obtained a modest parish in Pavia (Santa Maria Capella).

Between 1325 and 1328, his autobiography doesn't mention any event. Towards the end of this period, he wrote a treatise defending the supremacy of the papacy over the Empire (De preeminentia spiritualis imperii) against the ecclesiological views of Marsilius of Padua, then a close adviser to the emperor elect Lewis of Bavaria in whose hands Pavia had fallen. It is probably this which lead him to leave the city, and find refuge in the nearby Piemontese city of Valenza in the summer of 1329.

=== Avignon (1329 – circa 1353) ===
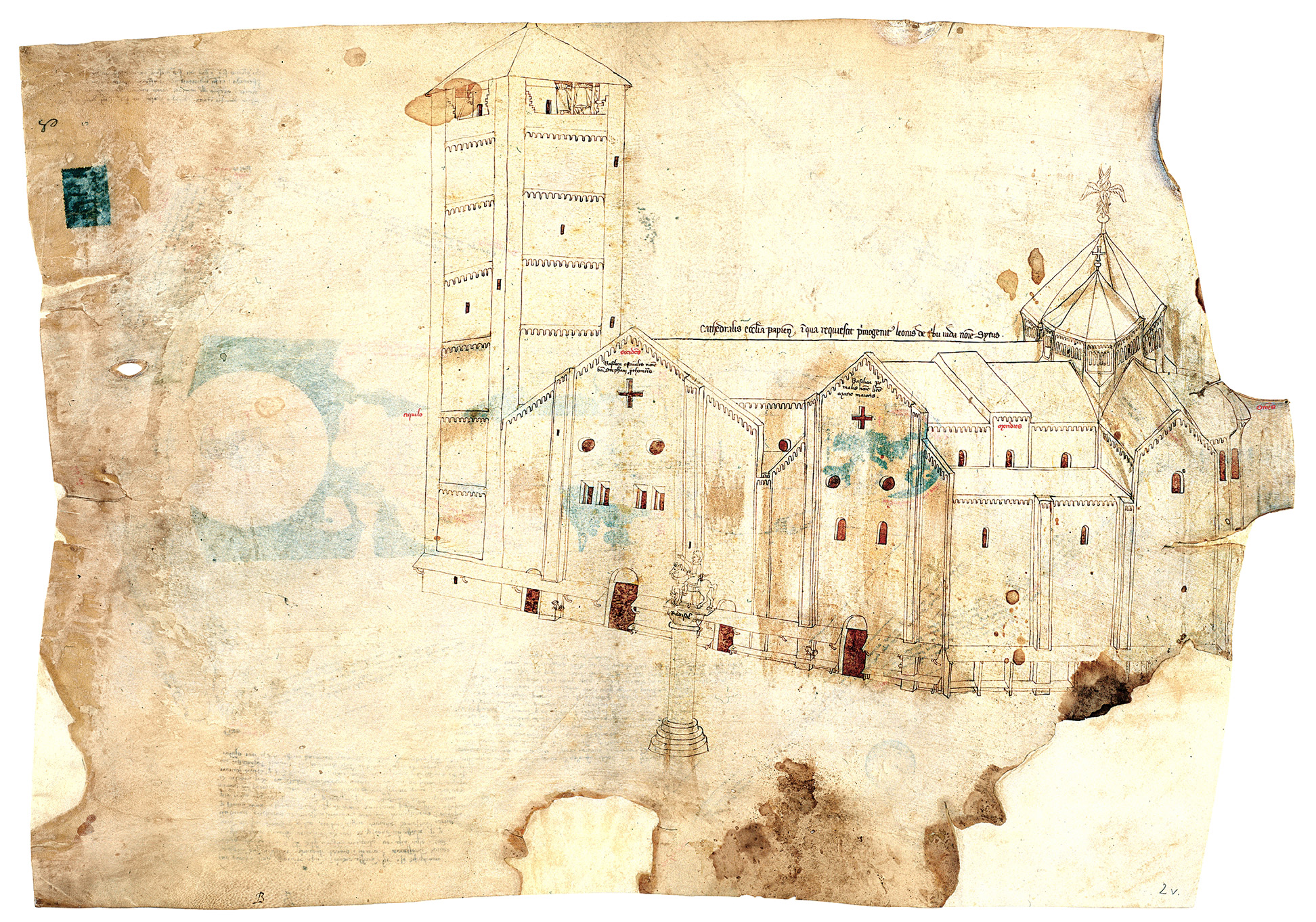
Cathedral of Pavia from manuscript Vatican, Pal. Lat. 1993, 1335–50

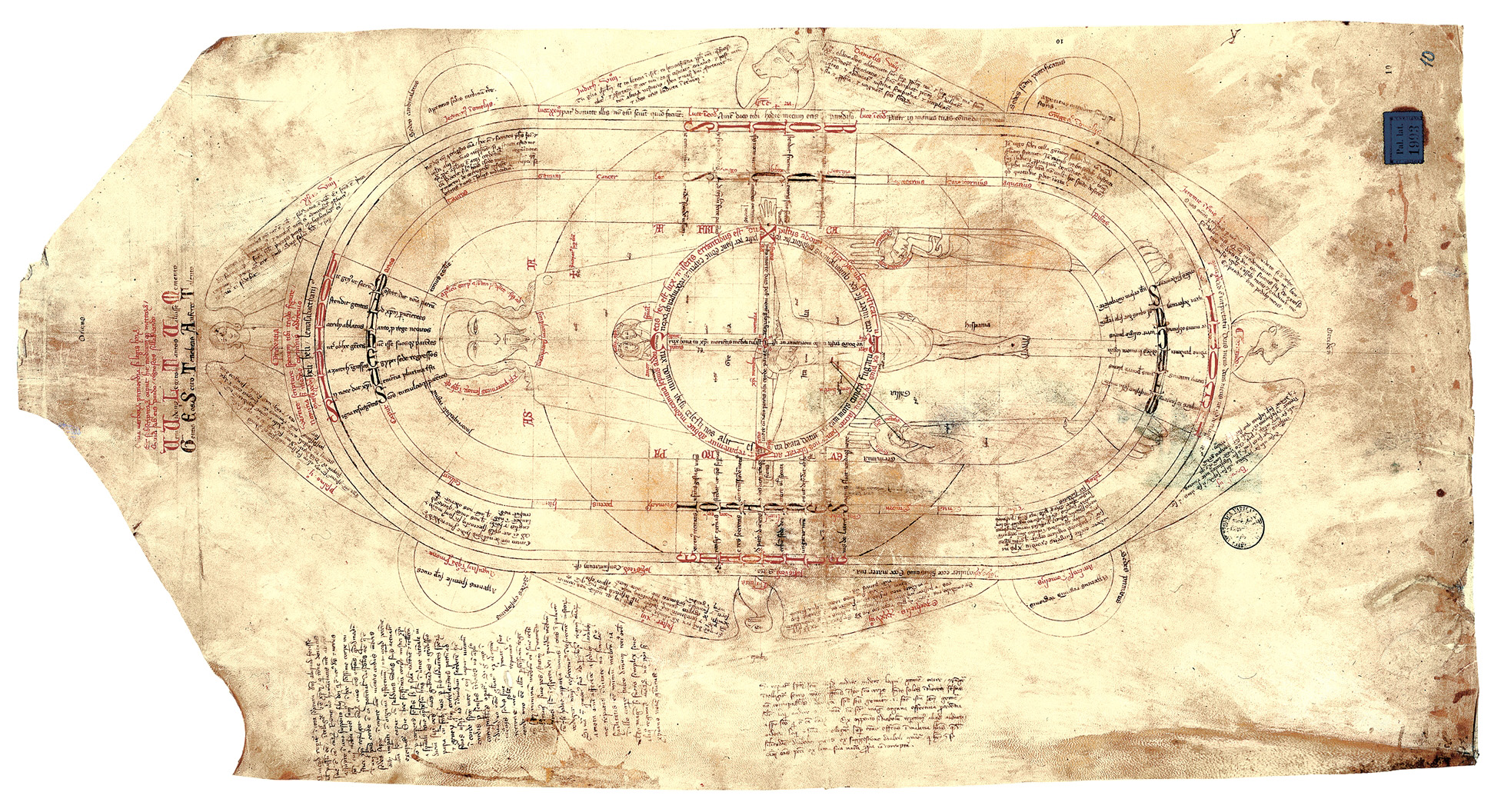
Diagram with Crucifixion, 1335–50

During his stay in Valenza, he wrote a treatise on the issue of Christian poverty (which has not been preserved). Arrived in Avignon in April 1329, where the Papal Court was located he managed to present his treatise to Pope John XXII. Returning to Valenza, he revised the De preeminentia spiritualis imperii and submitted to the pope. While awaiting for some rewards for his efforts, Opicinus produced a description of the city of Pavia (De laudibus civitatis ticinensis).

He eventually obtained a position as scribe at the Apostolic Penitentiary on 4 December 1330. However soon after, a suit was brought against him before the Rota, by the new bishop of Pavia, Giovanni Fulgosi, as part of a wider effort to reorganise the local clergy. Little is known about the suit, as in his writings, Opicinus is quite vague about its nature.

=== Illness and visions ===
On 31 March 1334 Opicinus suffered a serious illness in which he became comatose for nearly two weeks. When he recovered, he discovered that much of his memory was gone, that he could not speak and that his right hand was useless. He wrote,

On 31 March 1334 I fell sick. I received the sacraments and was near death through the first third of April. When I came to I found my limbs out of action…I had forgotten everything and could not even remember how the world looked outside of our dormitory…In the consequences of the disease I was mute, my right hand was lame and I had lost in a miraculous way a great deal of my literal memory.

Ultimately, Opicinus did recover his memory, speech and some function in his hand. He attributed this healing to a vision he experienced on 15 August, the feast of the assumption of the Virgin.

In the night of 15 August, I saw a dream of the Virgin with the Child in her lap...and through her merits she has given me back not the littera (knowledge) but a double spirit. Since 1 February 1335, I began to retire, bit by bit, from the work in our office because of the weakness of my hand.

Opicinus believed that his illness was the result of hidden sins that had corrupted his body. However, he interpreted his recovery as spiritual gift that allowed him to reveal spiritual truth.

In a spiritual work, however, this same hand proved stronger than before: since then it has draw all these pictures without any human help. At present my lost literal knowledge is replaced twofold by spiritual knowledge; my right hand is weak in worldly work, but strong in spiritual endeavors.”

The “pictures” he refers to are a complex series of maps and schematic diagrams in two manuscripts currently held at the Vatican library, Palatinus 1993 and Vaticanus 6435. These drawings were a means for Opicinus to chart the spiritual realities that he believed were the underpinnings of the physical world.

Much scholarship has interpreted Opicinus’s illness as psychosomatic, specifically the product of schizophrenia. However, whatever symptomatology can be gleaned from Opicinus’s abstruse writings seems to suggest that he suffered a stroke in addition to potential psychotic episodes.

He died in Avignon around 1353.

== Works ==
=== Writings prior to 1334 ===
These are treaties without drawings and known by the author's friends. Only De preeminentia spiritualis imperii (The primacy of spiritual power) and De laudibus Papie (Pavia eulogy) have survived to date in the form of copies.

- 1319: Liber metricus de parabolis Christi
- 1320: De decalogo mandatorum
- 1322: religious treaties
- 1324: Libellus dominice Passionis secundum concordantiam IIII evangelistarum
- 1329: De paupertate Christi, De virtutibus Christi, Lamentationes virginis Marie, De preeminentia spiritualis imperii
- 1330: Tractatus dominice orationis, Libellus confessionis, De laudibus Papie
- 1331: Tabula ecclesiastice hierarchie
- 1332: De septiloquio virginis Marie
- 1333: De promotionibus virginis Marie

=== Work after 1334 ===
Opicinus is best known for the two manuscripts he created following his illness, "BAV, Pal. lat. 1993" and "BAV, Vat. lat. 6435." These two manuscripts contain a variety of autobiographic drawings and writings which chart Opicinus's life and illness.

==== The Vaticanus latinus 6435 manuscript ====
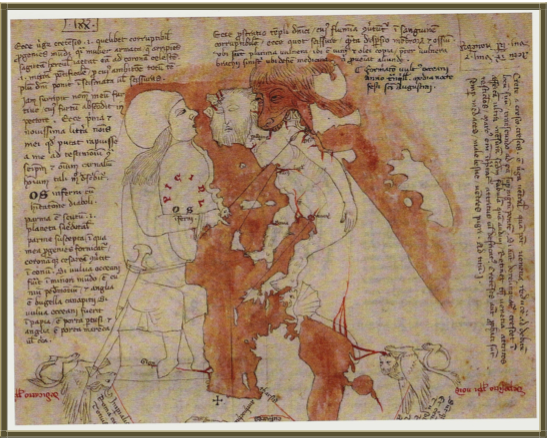
Vatican Lat. 6435 folio 79v.

Opicinus wrote the Vaticanus latinus between June and November 1337 and subsequently inserted addita (the last in December 1352). This manuscript, which was only identified on the eve of World War II(clarification needed), was recently fully published and translated by the medievalist Muriel Laharie as well as several studies by the psychiatrist Guy Roux – a multi-disciplinary collaboration essential to examining this singular work.

The Vaticanus comes in the form of a paper codex with 87 folios, with only written text in the first half, text and drawings (often map based) in the second half. It is a very dense document.

This codex looks similar to a journal written in chronological order. However, its polymorphous content, which is difficult to decipher, bears witness to the encyclopaedic culture of its author. Opicinus used all his knowledge to construct a cosmic identity appearing in numerous guises; he is God, the Sun, the Pope, Europe, Avignon, etc. Its colour anthropomorphic maps of the Mediterranean area, precise and curiously organised, illustrate "good" and "bad" characters and animals on which he projects himself and his enemies. The use of symbols, his taste for dissimulating and manipulating (words, numbers, space), and his attraction to the obscene and scatological are omnipresent and relate strongly to similar themes found broadly in medieval culture.

==== The Palatinus latinus 1993 manuscript ====
The Palatinus latinus, first identified in 1913, was the subject of a study by Richard Salomon in 1939, with a partial edition of the document and comments.

With 52 large colour drawings on parchment (often used on both sides) and covered with notes, Palatinus, 1993 apparently relies much less on a cartographic format; yet, invisible maps of the Mediterranean are underlying most of the diagrams, with sometimes only a few places expressed. The drawings are extremely schematic, using human figures covered in circles and ellipses. Opicinus also included a plethora of biblical quotations, calendars, astrological charts and medical imagery.

Some scholars (M. Laharie and G. Roux) claim that these drawings were produced later than the Vaticanus, with no firm basis. Only two diagrams are dated or connected to the 1350 Jubilee. Other evidences rather point to an early production of most of the other drawings, in 1335 or 1336, before the Vaticanus.
