= Johann Bussemacher =

German engraver and publisher

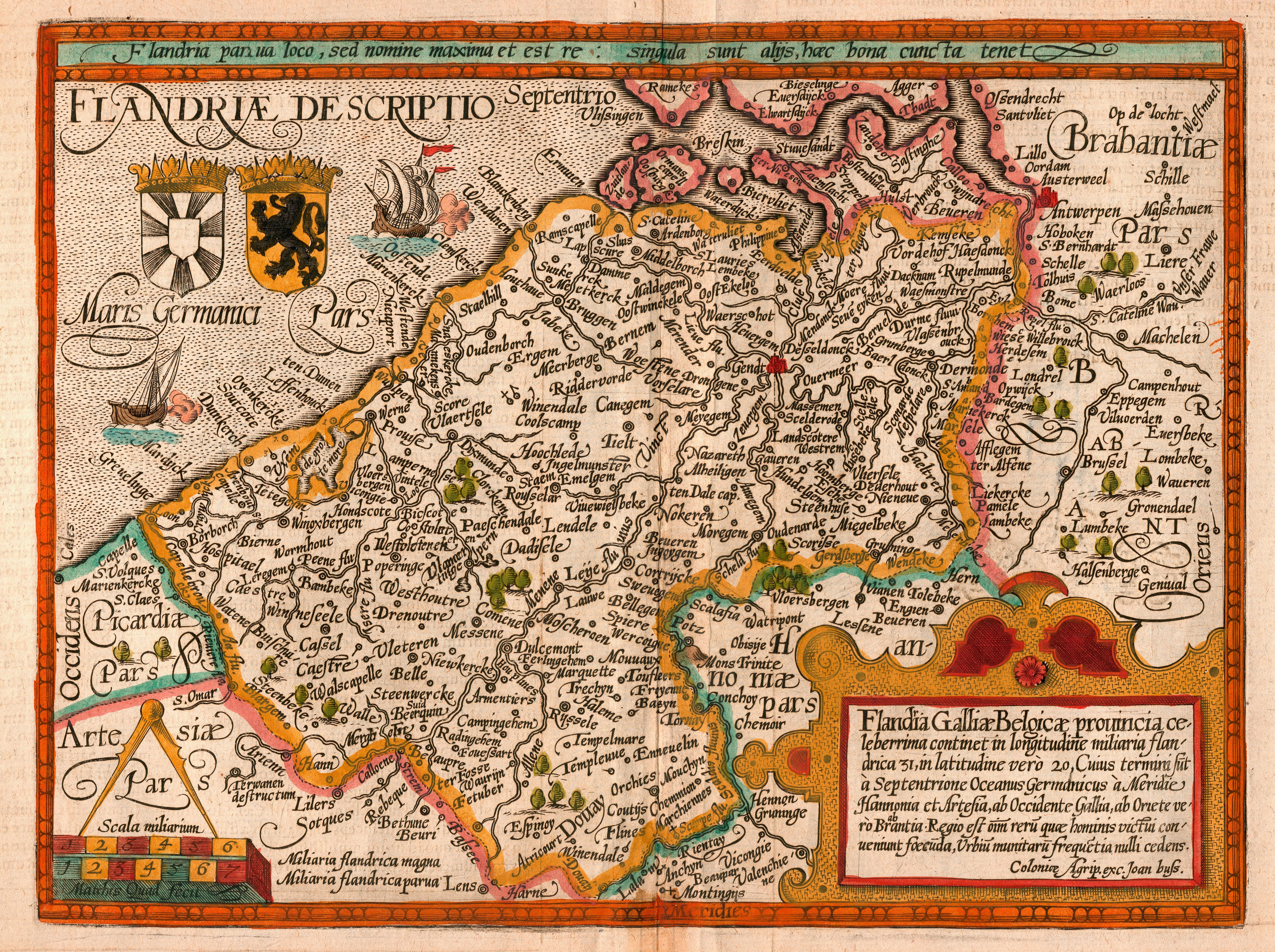
Map of the county of Flanders by Matthias Quad (cartographer) and Johann Bussemacher (engraver and printer), 1609.

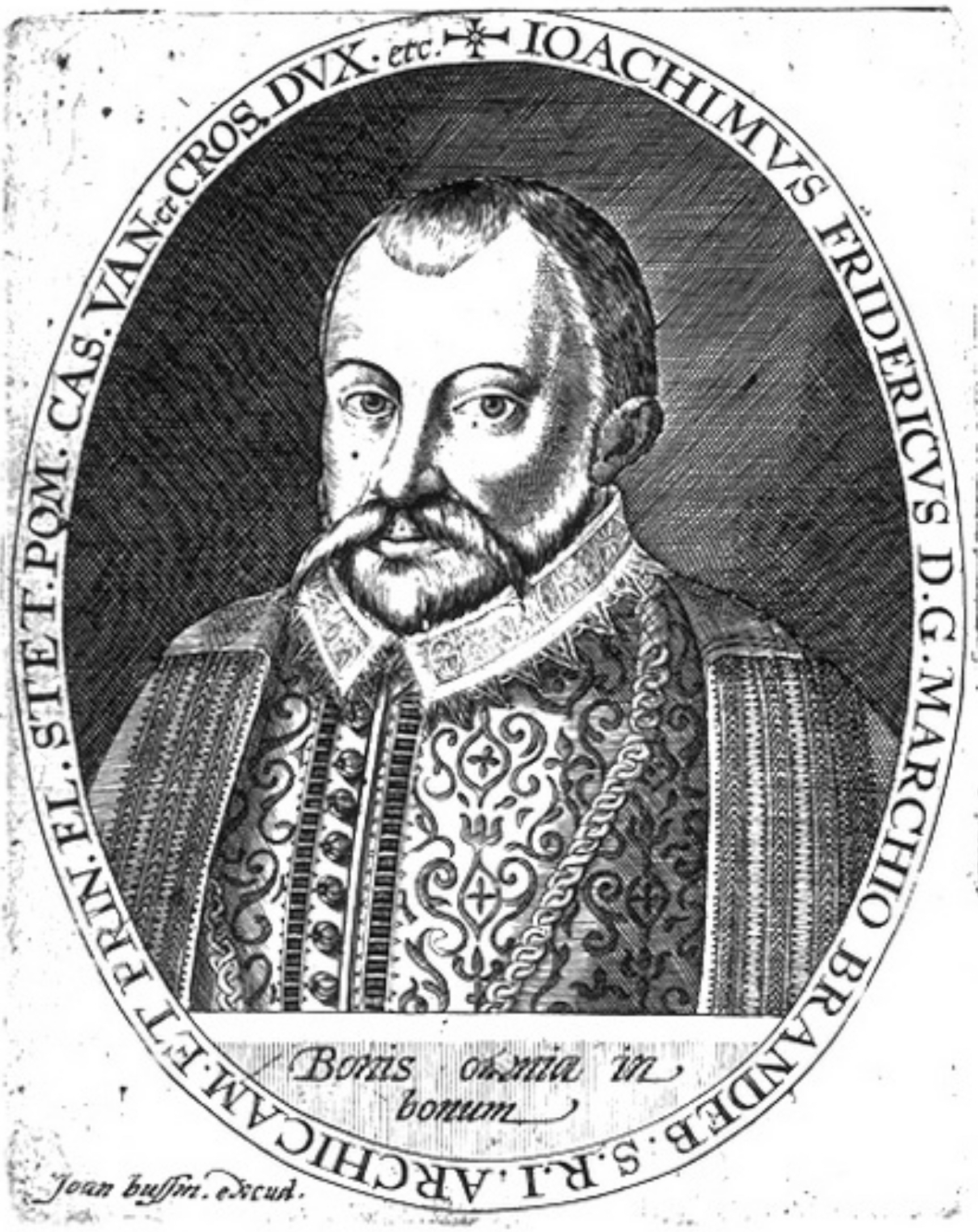
Joachim III Frederick, Elector of Brandenburg, ca. 1600.

Johann Bussemacher (fl. c.1580 – 1613) was a German engraver and publisher. Bussemacher was active as an engraver, printer, and art dealer in Cologne from about 1580 to 1613. His many works include several images of saints and a striking plate of Frau Richmuth Rising up from a Terace, taken from a roof painting once in the Basilica of the Holy Apostles, Cologne Church of the Apples.

His name (as "Ian Bussemaker") appears on a set of 13 engravings copied from Heinrich Aldegrever's Labours of Hercules and engraved by Pieter Maes; Bussemaher was presumably their publisher.
