= Matthias Quad =

Engraver and cartographer (1557–1613)

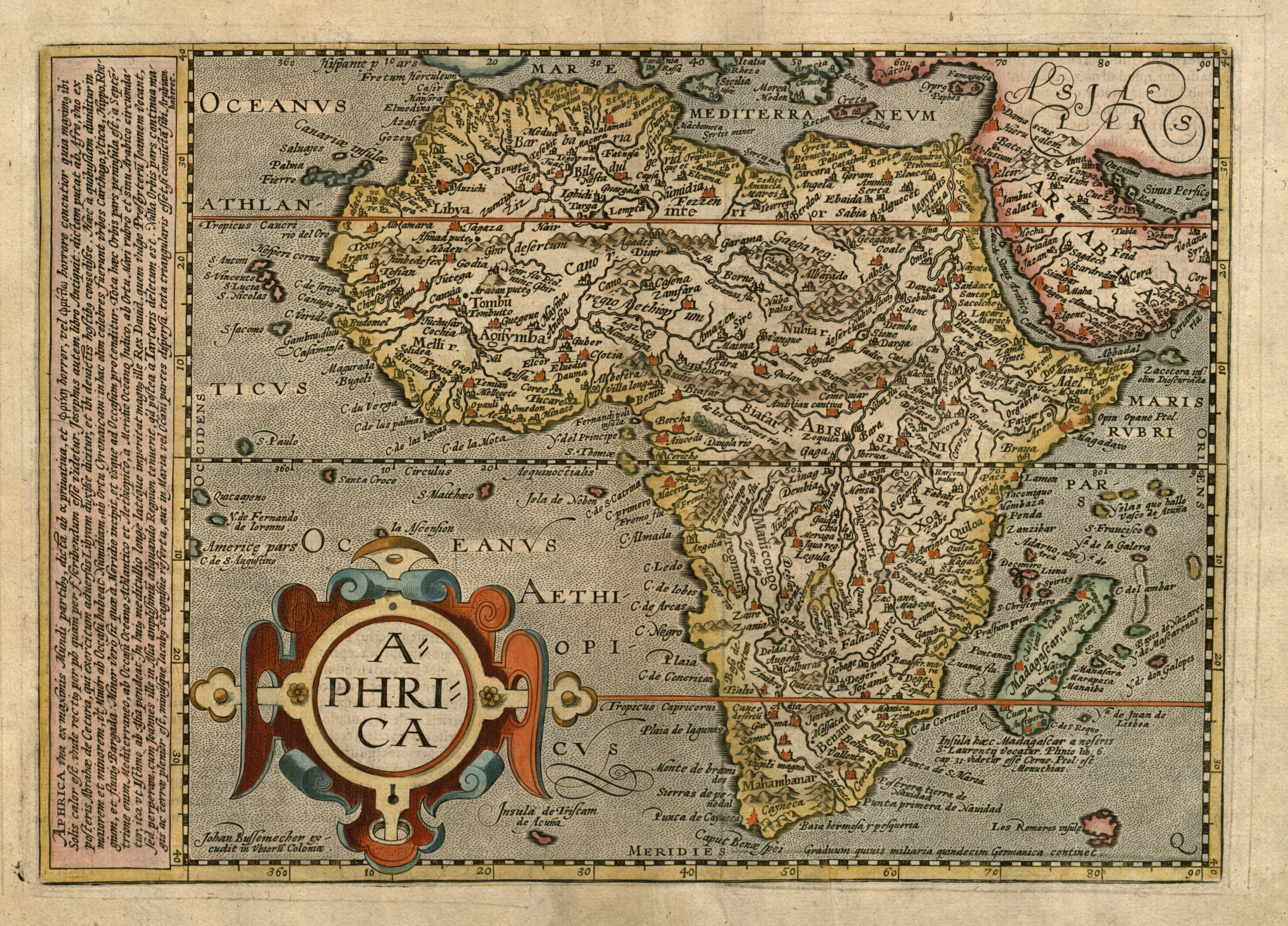
Aphrica, 1600, Johann Bussemacher after Matthias Quad

Matthias Quad (1557–1613) was an engraver and cartographer from Cologne. He was the first European mapmaker to use dotted lines to indicate international borders.

== Life ==
Matthias Quad was born and learnt engraving in the Netherlands. An engraver in wood and stone, Quad collaborated with the Cologne publisher Johann Bussemacher to publish a quarto atlas of Europe in 1592. This was expanded into a Geographisches Handtbuch (1599), with more text than maps, and then into a proper atlas, Fasciculus Geographicus (1608).

== Works ==
- Europea totius orbis terrarum praestantissimae..., 1592 (1596 edition on Internet Archive)
- Globi terrestris compendium, 1598 (On Google Books)
- Enchiridion Cosmographicum, 1599 (On Google Books)
- Geographisches Handtbuch, 1599/1600 (On Google Books)
- Deliciae Germaniae sive totius Germaniae itinerarium, 1600 (On Google Books)
- Itinerarium Universae Germaniae, 1602 (On Google Books)
- Deliciae Hispaniae et index viatorius indicans itinera, 1604 (On Google Books)
- Fasciculus Geographicus, 1608 (On Google Books)
